= List of fellows of the American Association for Cancer Research =

The American Association for Cancer Research elects classes of fellows to recognize influential scientists in the field of cancer research.

Six fellows were appointed to Vice President Biden’s Cancer Moonshot Initiative Blue Ribbon Panel. Several are members of the National Academy of Sciences, several have won a Lasker Award, several have won a Nobel Prize, several are HHMI Investigators, and several are past presidents of the AACR.

| Year elected | Name | Institution at time of induction |
|---|---|---|
| 2013 | Karen H. Antman, MD | Boston University School of Medicine |
| 2013 | David Baltimore, PhD | California Institute of Technology |
| 2013 | Françoise Barré-Sinoussi, PhD | Institute Pasteur |
| 2013 | Paul Berg, PhD | Stanford University School of Medicine |
| 2013 | Joseph R. Bertino, MD | The Cancer Institute of New Jersey/Robert Wood Johnson Medical School |
| 2013 | J. Michael Bishop, MD | University of California, San Francisco |
| 2013 | Mina Bissell, PhD | Lawrence Berkeley National Laboratory |
| 2013 | Elizabeth Blackburn, PhD | University of California, San Francisco |
| 2013 | Sydney Brenner, MBChB, DPhil | Salk Institute for Biological Studies |
| 2013 | Angela Hartley Brodie, PhD | University of Maryland School of Medicine |
| 2013 | Mario R. Capecchi, PhD | University of Utah |
| 2013 | Webster K. Cavenee, PhD | Ludwig Institute for Cancer Research, University of California San Diego |
| 2013 | Martin Chalfie, PhD | Columbia University |
| 2013 | Zhu Chen, MD, PhD | National People's Congress |
| 2013 | Aaron J. Ciechanover, DSc, MD | Technion-Israel Institute of Technology |
| 2013 | Bayard D. Clarkson, MD | Memorial Sloan Kettering Cancer Center |
| 2013 | Donald S. Coffey, PhD | Johns Hopkins University |
| 2013 | Stanley N. Cohen, MD | Stanford University School of Medicine |
| 2013 | Suzanne Cory, PhD | Walter & Eliza Hall Institute of Medical Research; University of Melbourne |
| 2013 | Carlo M. Croce, MD | Ohio State University Comprehensive Cancer Center |
| 2013 | Tom Curran, PhD | Children's Mercy Hospital |
| 2013 | Brian J. Druker, MD | Oregon Health & Science University Knight Cancer Institute |
| 2013 | Raymond N. DuBois, MD, PhD | Medical University of South Carolina |
| 2013 | Martin J. Evans, PhD | Cardiff University |
| 2013 | Emmanuel Farber, MD, PhD | University of Toronto |
| 2013 | Napoleone Ferrara, MD | Moores Cancer Center; University of California San Diego Moores Cancer Center |
| 2013 | Isaiah J. Fidler, DVM, PhD | University of Texas MD Anderson Cancer Center |
| 2013 | Bernard Fisher, MD | University of Pittsburgh |
| 2013 | Joseph F. Fraumeni Jr., MD | National Cancer Institute, National Institutes of Health |
| 2013 | Emil Frei, MD | Dana-Farber Cancer Institute, retired |
| 2013 | Elaine Fuchs, PhD | Rockefeller University |
| 2013 | Judy E. Garber, MD, MPH | Center for Cancer Genetics and Prevention, Dana–Farber Cancer Institute |
| 2013 | Walter Gilbert, PhD | BioVentures Investors |
| 2013 | Alfred G. Gilman, MD, PhD | University of Texas Southwestern Medical Center |
| 2013 | Carol W. Greider, PhD | Johns Hopkins University School of Medicine |
| 2013 | Roger C. L. Guillemin, MD, PhD | The Salk Institute for Biological Studies |
| 2013 | John B. Gurdon, DPhil | The Wellcome Trust; Cancer Research UK Gurdon Institute |
| 2013 | William N. Hait, MD, PhD | Janssen Research & Development |
| 2013 | Leland H. Hartwell, PhD | Arizona State University Biodesign Institute |
| 2013 | Avram Hershko, MD, PhD | Technion-Israel Institute of Technology |
| 2013 | James F. Holland, MD | Mount Sinai Medical Center |
| 2013 | Jimmie C. Holland, MD | Memorial Sloan-Kettering Cancer Center |
| 2013 | Waun Ki Hong, MD | University of Texas MD Anderson Cancer Center |
| 2013 | Leroy E. Hood, MD, PhD | Institute for Systems Biology |
| 2013 | H. Robert Horvitz, PhD | Massachusetts Institute of Technology |
| 2013 | Susan Band Horwitz, PhD | Albert Einstein College of Medicine |
| 2013 | R. Timothy Hunt, PhD | Cancer Research UK |
| 2013 | Tony Hunter, PhD | Salk Institute for Biological Studies |
| 2013 | Tyler Jacks, PhD | David H. Koch Institute for Integrative Cancer Research at Massachusetts Institute of Technology |
| 2013 | Peter A. Jones, DSc, PhD | Van Andel Research Institute |
| 2013 | V. Craig Jordan, DSc, PhD | University of Texas MD Anderson Cancer Center |
| 2013 | Y. W. Kan, DSc, MD | University of California, San Francisco |
| 2013 | Mary-Claire King, PhD | University of Washington School of Medicine |
| 2013 | Eva Klein, MD, PhD | Karolinska Institute |
| 2013 | George Klein, MD, PhD | Karolinska Institute |
| 2013 | Alfred G. Knudson Jr., MD, PhD | Fox Chase Cancer Center |
| 2013 | Brian K. Kobilka, MD | Stanford University School of Medicine |
| 2013 | Margaret L. Kripke, PhD | University of Texas MD Anderson Cancer Center |
| 2013 | Philip Leder, MD | Harvard Medical School |
| 2013 | Robert J. Lefkowitz, MD | Duke University Medical Center |
| 2013 | Arnold J. Levine, PhD | Institute for Advanced Study |
| 2013 | Lawrence A. Loeb, MD, PhD | University of Washington School of Medicine |
| 2013 | Tak W. Mak, PhD | Princess Margaret Cancer Centre, University of Toronto |
| 2013 | Lynn M. Matrisian, PhD | Pancreatic Cancer Action Network |
| 2013 | Frank McCormick, PhD | University of California, San Francisco |
| 2013 | John Mendelsohn, MD | MD Anderson Cancer Center |
| 2013 | Donald Metcalf, MD | University of Melbourne |
| 2013 | Enrico Mihich, MD | Dana-Farber Cancer Institute |
| 2013 | Beatrice Mintz, PhD | Fox Chase Cancer Center |
| 2013 | Luc Montagnier, MD | Pasteur Institute |
| 2013 | Harold L. Moses, MD | Vanderbilt-Ingram Cancer Center |
| 2013 | Paul M. Nurse, PhD | Francis Crick Institute |
| 2013 | Olufunmilayo I. Olopade, MD | University of Chicago Pritzker School of Medicine |
| 2013 | Arthur B. Pardee, PhD | Harvard Medical School |
| 2013 | Martine J. Piccart, MD, PhD | Institute Jules Bordet |
| 2013 | Bruce A.J. Ponder, PhD | Cancer Research UK Cambridge Research Institute |
| 2013 | Richard J. Roberts, PhD | New England Biolabs, Inc. |
| 2013 | Irwin A. Rose, PhD | University of California, Irvine |
| 2013 | Janet D. Rowley, MD | University of Chicago |
| 2013 | Frederick Sanger, PhD | University of Cambridge |
| 2013 | Alan C. Sartorelli, PhD | Yale University School of Medicine |
| 2013 | Andrew V. Schally, PhD | University of Miami |
| 2013 | Phillip A. Sharp, PhD | Massachusetts Institute of Technology |
| 2013 | Charles J. Sherr, MD, PhD | St. Jude Children's Research Hospital |
| 2013 | Osamu Shimomura, PhD | Boston University School of Medicine |
| 2013 | Dennis J. Slamon, MD, PhD | University of California Los Angeles |
| 2013 | Oliver Smithies, DPhil | University of North Carolina School of Medicine |
| 2013 | Michael B. Sporn, MD | Geisel School of Medicine at Dartmouth |
| 2013 | Louise C. Strong, MD | University of Texas MD Anderson Cancer Center |
| 2013 | Takashi Sugimura, MD | Toho University; National Cancer Center |
| 2013 | John E. Sulston, PhD | University of Manchester |
| 2013 | Jack W. Szostak, PhD | Massachusetts General Hospital |
| 2013 | Roger Y. Tsien, PhD | University of California, San Diego |
| 2013 | Arthur C. Upton, MD | Robert Wood Johnson Medical School |
| 2013 | George F. Vande Woude, Ph | Van Andel Research Institute |
| 2013 | Bert Vogelstein, MD | Ludwig Center for Cancer Genetics and Therapeutics; Johns Hopkins University School of Medicine |
| 2013 | Peter K. Vogt, PhD | The Scripps Research Institute |
| 2013 | Daniel D. Von Hoff, MD | Translational Genomics Research Institute |
| 2013 | Geoffrey M. Wahl, PhD | The Salk Institute for Biological Studies |
| 2013 | James D. Watson, DSc, PhD | Cold Spring Harbor Laboratory |
| 2013 | Lee W. Wattenberg, MD | University of Minnesota |
| 2013 | Robert A. Weinberg, PhD | Ludwig Center for Molecular Oncology; Massachusetts Institute of Technology |
| 2013 | John H. Weisburger, PhD | New York Medical College |
| 2013 | Jane Cooke Wright, MD | New York Medical College, retired |
| 2013 | Shinya Yamanaka, MD, PhD | University of California San Francisco |
| 2013 | Harald zur Hausen, DSc, MD | German Cancer Research Center |
| 2014 | Jerry Adams, PhD | Walter and Eliza Hall Institute of Medical Research |
| 2014 | James P. Allison, PhD | University of Texas MD Anderson Cancer Center |
| 2014 | Mariano Barbacid, PhD | Centro Nacional de Investigaciones Oncologicas |
| 2014 | Jose Baselga, MD, PhD | Memorial Sloan Kettering Cancer Center |
| 2014 | Stephen B. Baylin, MD | Johns Hopkins Kimmel Cancer Center |
| 2014 | Günter Blobel, MD, PhD | Rockefeller University |
| 2014 | David Botstein, PhD | Princeton University, Calico |
| 2014 | Joan Brugge, PhD | Harvard Medical School |
| 2014 | Lewis C. Cantley, PhD | Weill Cornell Medical College |
| 2014 | Pierre Chambon, MD | University of Strasbourg |
| 2014 | Hans Clevers, MD, PhD | University of Utrecht |
| 2014 | James E. Darnell Jr., MD | The Rockefeller University |
| 2014 | Titia de Lange, PhD | The Rockefeller University |
| 2014 | Vincent T. DeVita Jr., MD | Yale Medical School |
| 2014 | Lawrence H. Einhorn, MD | Indiana University School of Medicine |
| 2014 | Stephen J. Elledge, PhD | Brigham and Women’s Hospital |
| 2014 | Ronald M. Evans, PhD | Salk Institute for Biological Studies |
| 2014 | Andrew Fire, PhD | Stanford University School of Medicine |
| 2014 | Emil J. Freireich, MD | University of Texas MD Anderson Cancer Center |
| 2014 | Robert C. Gallo, MD | University of Maryland School of Medicine |
| 2014 | Douglas Hanahan, PhD | Swiss Institute for Experimental Cancer Research |
| 2014 | Richard O. Hynes, PhD | Massachusetts Institute of Technology |
| 2014 | William Kaelin Jr., MD | Dana–Farber Cancer Institute Harvard Medical School |
| 2014 | Kenneth W. Kinzler, PhD | Johns Hopkins Kimmel Cancer Center |
| 2014 | Richard Kolodner, PhD | Ludwig Institute for Cancer Research |
| 2014 | Ronald Levy, MD | Stanford University School of Medicine |
| 2014 | Frederick Pei Li, MD | Dana-Farber Cancer Institute |
| 2014 | David M. Livingston, MD | Dana–Farber Cancer Institute |
| 2014 | Paul A. Marks, MD | Memorial Sloan Kettering Cancer Center |
| 2014 | Peter Nowell, MD | Perelman School of Medicine, University of Pennsylvania |
| 2014 | Christiane Nüsslein-Volhard, PhD | Max Planck Institute for Developmental Biology |
| 2014 | Sir Richard Peto, FRS | University of Oxford |
| 2014 | Charles L. Sawyers, MD | Memorial Sloan Kettering Cancer Center |
| 2014 | Sir Michael Stratton, MBBS, PhD | Wellcome Trust Sanger Institute |
| 2014 | Axel Ullrich, PhD | Max Planck Institute of Biochemistry |
| 2014 | Inder Verma, PhD | Salk Institute for Biological Sciences |
| 2014 | Irving Weissman, MD | Stanford University School of Medicine |
| 2014 | Owen Witte, MD | University of California, Los Angeles |
| 2015 | Kenneth C. Anderson, MD | Dana–Farber Cancer Institute |
| 2015 | Carlos L. Arteaga, MD | Vanderbilt-Ingram Cancer Center |
| 2015 | Anton J.M. Berns, PhD | Netherlands Cancer Institute |
| 2015 | Bruce A. Chabner, MD | Massachusetts General Hospital |
| 2015 | Ronald A. DePinho, MD | University of Texas MD Anderson Cancer Center |
| 2015 | Susan D. Desmond-Hellmann, MD, MPH | Bill & Melinda Gates Foundation |
| 2015 | Robert N. Eisenman | Fred Hutchinson Cancer Research Center |
| 2015 | Douglas R. Lowy, MD | National Cancer Institute |
| 2015 | Carol L. Prives, PhD | Columbia University |
| 2015 | Steven A. Rosenberg, MD, PhD | National Cancer Institute |
| 2015 | Craig B. Thompson, MD | Memorial Sloan Kettering Cancer Center |
| 2016 | Bruce Alberts, PhD | University of California, San Francisco |
| 2016 | Clara D. Bloomfield, MD | The Ohio State University Comprehensive Cancer Center |
| 2016 | Thomas R. Cech, PhD | University of Colorado, Boulder |
| 2016 | John E. Dick, PhD | University of Toronto |
| 2016 | Joe W. Gray, PhD | Oregon Health & Science University |
| 2016 | Rudolf Jaenisch, MD | Whitehead Institute for Biomedical Research |
| 2016 | Eric S. Lander, PhD | The Broad Institute of MIT and Harvard |
| 2016 | Sir David P. Lane, PhD | Ludwig Institute for Cancer Research |
| 2016 | Henry T. Lynch, MD | Creighton University School of Medicine |
| 2016 | Joan Massagué, PhD | Memorial Sloan Kettering Cancer Center |
| 2016 | Joseph Schlessinger, PhD | Yale School of Medicine |
| 2017 | Sir Adrian P. Bird, PhD | University of Edinburgh |
| 2017 | Emmanuelle Charpentier, PhD | Max Planck Institute for Infection Biology |
| 2017 | Riccardo Dalla-Favera, MD | Columbia University |
| 2017 | Nancy E. Davidson, MD | University of Washington |
| 2017 | Vishva M. Dixit, MD | Genentech |
| 2017 | Jennifer A. Doudna, PhD | UC Berkeley |
| 2017 | Carl H. June, MD | University of Pennsylvania School of Medicine |
| 2017 | Michael Karin, PhD | UC San Diego |
| 2017 | Michael B. Kastan, MD, PhD | Duke University School of Medicine |
| 2017 | Tomas Lindahl, MD, FRS | Francis Crick Institute |
| 2017 | Paul L. Modrich, PhD | Duke University Medical Center |
| 2017 | Karen H. Vousden, PhD | Francis Crick Institute |
| 2018 | Alan Ashworth, PhD, FRS | University of California, San Francisco |
| 2018 | René Bernards, DPhil | Netherlands Cancer Institute |
| 2018 | Bruce A. Beutler, MD | UT Southwestern Medical Center |
| 2018 | Michael A. Caligiuri, MD | City of Hope National Medical Center |
| 2018 | Chi Van Dang, MD, PhD | Ludwig Institute for Cancer Research |
| 2018 | Gary Gilliland, MD, PhD | Fred Hutchinson Cancer Research Center |
| 2018 | Laurie H. Glimcher, MD | Dana–Farber Cancer Institute |
| 2018 | Elizabeth M. Jaffee, MD | Johns Hopkins Kimmel Cancer Center |
| 2018 | Richard D. Klausner, MD | Juno Therapeutics |
| 2018 | Roger D. Kornberg, PhD | Stanford University School of Medicine |
| 2018 | Arthur D. Levinson, PhD | Calico Life Sciences |
| 2018 | Norman E. Sharpless, MD | National Cancer Institute |
| 2019 | Frederick R. Appelbaum, MD | Fred Hutchinson Cancer Research Center |
| 2019 | Dafna Bar-Sagi, PhD | NYU Langone Medical Center |
| 2019 | Lisa M. Coussens, PhD | Knight Cancer Institute; Oregon Health & Science University |
| 2019 | George Q. Daley, MD, PhD | Harvard Medical School |
| 2019 | Gerard Evan, PhD | University of Cambridge |
| 2019 | Gordon J. Freeman, PhD | Dana–Farber Cancer Institute |
| 2019 | Levi A. Garraway, MD, PhD | Eli Lilly and Company |
| 2019 | Melvyn Greaves, PhD | Institute of Cancer Research |
| 2019 | Philip D. Greenberg, MD | Fred Hutchinson Cancer Research Center |
| 2019 | Daniel Haber, MD, PhD | Harvard Medical School |
| 2019 | Jules A. Hoffmann, PhD | University of Strasbourg |
| 2019 | Tasuku Honjo, MD, PhD | Kyoto University |
| 2019 | Scott W. Lowe, PhD | Memorial Sloan Kettering Cancer Center |
| 2019 | Elaine Mardis, PhD | Nationwide Children's Hospital |
| 2019 | Larry Norton, MD | Memorial Sloan Kettering Cancer Center |
| 2019 | Moshe Oren, PhD | Weizmann Institute of Science |
| 2019 | Robert D. Schreiber, PhD | Washington University in St. Louis |
| 2019 | Arlene H. Sharpe, MD, PhD | Harvard Medical School |
| 2019 | Louis M. Staudt, MD, PhD | National Cancer Institute |
| 2019 | Bruce William Stillman, PhD | Cold Spring Harbor Laboratory |
| 2019 | Zena Werb, PhD | University of California, San Francisco |
| 2019 | Eric F. Wieschaus, PhD | Princeton University |
| 2020 | Myles A. Brown, MD | Dana–Farber Cancer Institute; Harvard Medical School |
| 2020 | Judith Campisi, PhD | Buck Institute for Research on Aging |
| 2020 | Arul Chinnaiyan, MD, PhD | University of Michigan |
| 2020 | Alan D. D'Andrea, MD | Dana–Farber Cancer Institute; Harvard Medical School |
| 2020 | Mark M. Davis, PhD | Stanford University School of Medicine |
| 2020 | Gregory J. Hannon, PhD | University of Cambridge |
| 2020 | Rakesh K. Jain, PhD | Harvard Medical School and Massachusetts General Hospital |
| 2020 | Maria Jasin, PhD | Memorial Sloan Kettering Cancer Center |
| 2020 | Robert S. Langer, ScD | Massachusetts Institute of Technology |
| 2020 | Bert W. O'Malley, MD | Baylor College of Medicine |
| 2020 | Drew Mark Pardoll, MD, PhD | Johns Hopkins University |
| 2020 | Kornelia Polyak, MD, PhD | Harvard Medical School |
| 2020 | Peter J. Ratcliffe, FRS | University of Oxford |
| 2020 | Antoni Ribas, MD, PhD | University of California Los Angeles Medical Center |
| 2020 | Gregg L. Semenza, MD, PhD | Johns Hopkins University School of Medicine |
| 2020 | Charles Swanton, MD, PhD | The Francis Crick Institute and University College London Cancer Institute |
| 2020 | David A. Tuveson, MD, PhD | Cold Spring Harbor Laboratory Cancer Center |
| 2020 | Michael Wigler, PhD | Cold Spring Harbor Laboratory |
| 2020 | Sir Gregory Winter, CBE, FRS, FMedSci | Trinity College |
| 2021 | Lucile Adams-Campbell, PhD | Georgetown University Medical Center |
| 2021 | Frances Arnold, PhD | California Institute of Technology |
| 2021 | Allan Balmain, PhD, FRSE, FRS | University of California, San Francisco |
| 2021 | Anna D. Barker, PhD | Laurence J. Ellison Institute for Transformative Medicine |
| 2021 | Mary C. Beckerle, PhD | University of Utah |
| 2021 | Shelley L. Berger, PhD | University of Pennsylvania Perelman School of Medicine |
| 2021 | John D. Carpten, PhD | University of Southern California |
| 2021 | Lieping Chen, MD, PhD | Yale University School of Medicine |
| 2021 | Don W. Cleveland, PhD | University of California, San Diego |
| 2021 | Sara A. Courtneidge, PhD | Oregon Health & Science University |
| 2021 | Albert de la Chapelle, MD, PhD | deceased |
| 2021 | George D. Demetri, MD | Dana-Farber Cancer Institute |
| 2021 | Philip C. Hanawalt, PhD | Stanford University |
| 2021 | Curtis C. Harris, MD | National Cancer Institute |
| 2021 | Nancy H. Hopkins, PhD | Massachusetts Institute of Technology |
| 2021 | Guillermina Lozano, PhD | University of Texas MD Anderson Cancer Center |
| 2021 | Shigekazu Nagata, PhD | Osaka University |
| 2021 | Aviv Rezev, PhD | Genentech, Inc |
| 2021 | Martine F. Roussel, PhD | St. Jude Children's Research Hospital |
| 2021 | Ton N. Schumacher, PhD | The Netherlands Cancer Institute, Oncode Institute |
| 2021 | M. Celeste Simon, PhD | University of Pennsylvania Perelman School of Medicine |
| 2021 | Tadatsugu Taniguchi, PhD | The University of Tokyo |
| 2021 | Xiaodong Wang, PhD | National Institute of Biological Sciences |
| 2021 | Eileen P. White, PhD | Rutgers, The State University Of New Jersey |
| 2021 | Yosef Yarden, PhD | Weizmann Institute of Science |
| 2022 | Anne-Lise Børresen-Dale, PhD, MD (hc) | University of Oslo |
| 2022 | Otis Webb Brawley, MD | Johns Hopkins University |
| 2022 | Peter J. Campbell, MBBCh, PhD | Wellcome Sanger Institute |
| 2022 | Neal G. Copeland, PhD | The University of Texas MD Anderson Cancer Center |
| 2022 | Luis Alberto Diaz Jr., MD | Memorial Sloan Kettering Cancer Center |
| 2022 | James R. Downing, MD | St. Jude Children's Research Hospital |
| 2022 | Connie J. Eaves, OC, FRSC, FRS, CorrFRSE | British Columbia Cancer Research Center |
| 2022 | Denise A. Galloway, PhD | Fred Hutchinson Cancer Center |
| 2022 | Patricia A. Ganz, MD | University of California Los Angeles |
| 2022 | K. Christopher Garcia, PhD | Stanford University |
| 2022 | Jennifer R. Grandis, MD | University of California San Francisco |
| 2022 | James R. Heath, PhD | Institute for Systems Biology |
| 2022 | Nancy A. Jenkins, PhD | The University of Texas MD Anderson Cancer Center |
| 2022 | Thomas J. Kelly, MD, PhD | Memorial Sloan Kettering Cancer Center |
| 2022 | Crystal L. Mackall, MD | Stanford University School of Medicine |
| 2022 | Alex Matter, MD | Agency for Science, Technology, and Research |
| 2022 | Ira Mellman, PhD | Genentech Inc. |
| 2022 | Gordon B. Mills, MD, PhD | Oregon Health and Science University |
| 2022 | Nikola P. Pavletich, PhD | Memorial Sloan Kettering Cancer Center |
| 2022 | Cecil B. Pickett, PhD | Biogen Inc. |
| 2022 | Jennifer A. Pietenpol, PhD | Vanderbilt University |
| 2022 | Terence H. Rabbitts, FRS, FMedSci | Institute of Cancer Research |
| 2022 | Neal Rosen, MD, PhD | Memorial Sloan Kettering Cancer Center |
| 2022 | Varda Rotter, PhD | Weizmann Institute of Science |
| 2022 | Alexander Y. Rudensky, PhD | Memorial Sloan Kettering Cancer Center |
| 2022 | Yang Shi, PhD | Ludwig Institute for Cancer Research |
| 2022 | Margaret A. Shipp, MD | Harvard Medical School |
| 2022 | Yu Shyr, PhD | Vanderbilt University Medical Center |
| 2022 | Maxine F. Singer, PhD | Carnegie Institution for Science |
| 2022 | Hamilton O. Smith, MD | J. Craig Venter Institute |
| 2022 | Suzanne L. Topalian, MD | Johns Hopkins University School of Medicine |
| 2022 | Victor E. Velculescu, MD, PhD | Johns Hopkins University School of Medicine |
| 2022 | Jane E. Visvader, PhD | Walter and Eliza Hall Institute of Medical Research |
| 2023 | Carolyn R. Bertozzi, PhD | Stanford University |
| 2023 | Stephen J. Chanock, MD | National Cancer Institute |
| 2023 | George Coukos, MD, PhD | Ludwig Institute for Cancer Research |
| 2023 | Hugues de Thé, MD, PhD | College de France |
| 2023 | Julian Downward, PhD | The Francis Crick Institute |
| 2023 | Laura J. Esserman, MD, MBA | University of California San Francisco |
| 2023 | Keith T. Flaherty, MD | Harvard Medical School |
| 2023 | P. Andrew Futreal, PhD | The University of Texas MD Anderson Cancer Center |
| 2023 | Judy Lieberman, MD, PhD | Harvard Medical School |
| 2023 | Patricia M. LoRusso, DO, PhD (hc) | Yale Cancer Center and Smilow Cancer Hospital |
| 2023 | Luis F. Parada, PhD | Memorial Sloan Kettering Cancer Center |
| 2023 | Dana Pe’er, PhD | Memorial Sloan Kettering Cancer Center |
| 2023 | Charles M. Perou, PhD | University of North Carolina Lineberger Comprehensive Cancer Center |
| 2023 | Helen Piwnica-Worms, PhD | The University of Texas MD Anderson Cancer Center |
| 2023 | Thomas M. Roberts, PhD | Harvard Medical School |
| 2023 | Erkki Ruoslahti, MD, PhD | Sanford Burnham Prebys |
| 2023 | Michel Sadelain, MD, PhD | Memorial Sloan Kettering Cancer Center |
| 2023 | Kevan M. Shokat, PhD | University of California, Berkeley |
| 2023 | Andreas Strasser, PhD | Walter and Eliza Hall Institute of Medical Research |
| 2023 | Jean Y. J. Wang, PhD | University of California San Diego School of Medicine |
| 2023 | Robert A. Winn, MD | Virginia Commonwealth University School of Medicine |
| 2023 | Jedd Wolchok, MD, PhD | Weill Medical College of Cornell University |
| 2023 | Catherine J. Wu, MD | Harvard University |
| 2024 | Frederick W. Alt, PhD | Howard Hughes Medical Institute |
| 2024 | Laura D. Attardi, PhD | Stanford University |
| 2024 | Sangeeta N. Bhatia, MD, PhD | Howard Hughes Medical Institute |
| 2024 | Andrea Califano, Dr | Columbia University |
| 2024 | John M. Carethers, MD | University of California San Diego |
| 2024 | Craig M. Crews, PhD | Yale School of Medicine |
| 2024 | Benjamin L. Ebert, MD, PhD | Howard Hughes Medical Institute |
| 2024 | Silvia C. Formenti, MD | New York-Presbyterian Hospital |
| 2024 | Susan M. Galbraith, MBBChir, PhD | AstraZeneca |
| 2024 | Richard D. Gelber, PhD | Dana-Farber Cancer Institute |
| 2025 | Rafi Ahmed, PhD | Emory University |
| 2025 | Shankar Balasubramanian, PhD | University of Cambridge |
| 2025 | Bradley Bernstein, MD, PhD | Dana-Farber Cancer Institute |
| 2025 | Nina Bhardwaj, MD, PhD | Tisch Cancer Institute at Mount Sinai |
| 2025 | Piet Borst, MD, PhD | The Netherlands Cancer Institute |
| 2025 | Garrett M. Brodeur, MD | Children's Hospital of Philadelphia / University of Pennsylvania |
| 2025 | Pelayo Correa, MD | Vanderbilt University Medical Center |
| 2025 | Frederic J. de Sauvage, PhD | Genentech |
| 2025 | Caroline Dive, PhD | Cancer Research UK Manchester Institute |
| 2025 | Susan M. Domchek, MD | Abramson Cancer Center at the University of Pennsylvania |
| 2025 | David Fisher, MD, PhD | Massachusetts General Hospital / Harvard Medical School |
| 2025 | Stephan Grupp, MD, PhD | Children's Hospital of Philadelphia / University of Pennsylvania |
| 2025 | Manuel Hidalgo, MD, PhD | Weill Cornell Medicine / NewYork-Presbyterian Hospital |
| 2025 | Susan Hilsenbeck, PhD | Baylor College of Medicine |
| 2025 | Elaine Jaffe, MD | National Cancer Institute |
| 2025 | John Kuriyan, PhD | Vanderbilt University School of Medicine Basic Sciences |
| 2025 | Thomas Look, MD | Dana-Farber Cancer Institute |
| 2025 | Ari Melnick, MD | Weill Cornell Medicine |
| 2025 | Paul Mischel, MD | Stanford University School of Medicine |
| 2025 | Nubia Muñoz, MD, MPH | National Cancer Institute of Colombia |
| 2025 | Lisa Newman, MD, MPH | Weill Cornell Medicine |
| 2025 | Electra Paskett, PhD | The Ohio State University Comprehensive Cancer Center |
| 2025 | Ira Pastan, MD | National Cancer Institute |
| 2025 | William Sellers, MD | Dana-Farber Cancer Institute |
| 2025 | David Sidransky, MD | Johns Hopkins University School of Medicine |
| 2025 | Josep Tabernero, MD, PhD | Vall d'Hebron Institute of Oncology |
| 2025 | Ronald D. Vale, PhD | Janelia Research Campus, Howard Hughes Medical Institute |
| 2025 | Ashok Venkitaraman, MBBS, PhD | Cancer Science Institute of Singapore |
| 2025 | Robert H. Vonderheide, MD, DPhil | Abramson Cancer Center at the University of Pennsylvania |
| 2025 | John N. Weinstein, MD, PhD | UT MD Anderson Cancer Center |
| 2025 | Paul Workman, PhD | The Institute of Cancer Research |
| 2025 | Jinghui Zhang, PhD | St. Jude Children's Research Hospital |
| 2025 | Leonard I. Zon, MD | Boston Children's Hospital / Harvard Medical School |
| 2026 | Cory Abate-Shen, PhD | Columbia University Irving Medical Center |
| 2026 | Alberto Bardelli, PhD | University of Turin and IFOM ETS |
| 2026 | Benjamin F. Cravatt, PhD | Scripps Research |
| 2026 | Christina Curtis, PhD, MSc | Stanford School of Medicine |
| 2026 | Giulio F. Draetta, MD, PhD | The University of Texas MD Anderson Cancer Center |
| 2026 | Douglas T. Fearon, MD | Cold Spring Harbor Laboratory / Weill Cornell Medicine |
| 2026 | Rebecca C. Fitzgerald, MA(Cantab), MD | University of Cambridge |
| 2026 | Sir Stephen P. Jackson, PhD | University of Cambridge and Gurdon Institute |
| 2026 | Lewis L. Lanier, PhD | University of California, San Francisco |
| 2026 | Anthony G. Letai, MD, PhD | Dana-Farber Cancer Institute |
| 2026 | Ross L. Levine, MD | Memorial Sloan Kettering Cancer Center |
| 2026 | Juanita L. Merchant, MD, PhD | University of Arizona |
| 2026 | William G. Nelson, MD, PhD | Johns Hopkins Sidney Kimmel Comprehensive Cancer Center |
| 2026 | Garry P. Nolan, PhD | Stanford University |
| 2026 | Kenneth Offit, MD, MPH | Memorial Sloan Kettering Cancer Center |
| 2026 | Pamela S. Ohashi, PhD | Princess Margaret Cancer Centre |
| 2026 | Charles W. M. Roberts, MD, PhD | St. Jude Children's Research Hospital |
| 2026 | Anil K. Rustgi, MD | Herbert Irving Comprehensive Cancer Center, Columbia University |
| 2026 | Alice T. Shaw, MD, PhD | Dana-Farber Cancer Institute |
| 2026 | Yosef Shiloh, PhD | Tel Aviv University |
| 2026 | Kimberly Stegmaier, MD | Dana-Farber Cancer Institute and Boston Children's Hospital |
| 2026 | Matthew Vander Heiden, MD, PhD | Massachusetts Institute of Technology / Dana-Farber Cancer Institute |
| 2026 | Jennifer A. Wargo, MD, MMSc | The University of Texas MD Anderson Cancer Center |
| 2026 | Laurence Zitvogel, MD, PhD | University of Paris-Saclay |
