= Bruce Chabner =

American Oncologist

Bruce Alan Chabner is an American medical oncologist and researcher who worked at the National Cancer Institute and now is a professor of medicine at Harvard Medical School. He is also the director of clinical research at the Cancer Center at Massachusetts General Hospital. His expansive research of cancer pharmacology most notably includes his contributions to developing anti-folate drugs for the treatment of cancer. His work at NIH led to the development of Taxol, a commonly prescribed breast cancer drug.

== Education and Career ==
He completed his undergraduate education at Yale University in 1961 and received his MD from Harvard Medical School in 1965.

Chabner entered the Public Health Service and started working at the National Cancer Institute (NCI) part of the National Institute of Health (NIH), where he studied under Joseph Bertino. His work at NIH led to the development of Taxol, a commonly prescribed breast cancer drug. He left the NIH in 1995 after 27 years at NCI and thirteen years as the director of the division of Cancer Treatment at NCI to join the faculty at Mass General Hospital as chief of hematology and oncology.

He is the director of clinical research at the Cancer Center at Massachusetts General Hospital and professor of medicine at Harvard Medical School.

== Awards and honors ==
- 1976 Elected Member of the American Society for Clinical Investigation
- 1985 David A. Karnofsky Memorial Award and Lecture, American Society of Clinical Oncology
- 1986 Distinguished Oncologist Award, Dayton Oncology Society
- 1986 Melville Jacobs Award, American Radium Society
- 1987 Meritorious Service Medal, U.S. Public Health Service
- 1996 Kantor Family Prize for Cancer Research Excellence
- 1998 AACR-Bruce F. Cain Memorial Award
- 2005 Paul Calabresi Award, National Cancer Institute
- 2006 Member of the National Cancer Advisory Board, National Cancer Institute
- 2013 Honoree, The One Hundred, Massachusetts General Hospital Cancer Center
- 2015 Elected Fellow of the AACR Academy

== Personal life ==
Chabner grew up in Shelbyville, Illinois as the son of a general practitioner. He is married to Davi-Ellen Rosenzweig and has two children and five grandchildren.
