= Jennifer Pietenpol =

American Breast Cancer Researcher

- Education: BS, Biology, 1986, Carleton College PhD, 1990, Vanderbilt University
- Known for: p53, p73, Breast Cancer, Triple Negative Breast Cancer, VICC
- Scientific career
- Institutions: Johns Hopkins University Vanderbilt University

Jennifer Pietenpol is Chief Scientific and Strategic Officer, Executive Vice-President for Research, Professor of Biochemistry, and Ingram Professor of Cancer Research at Vanderbilt University Medical Center. Pietenpol additionally serves as the Chief Scientific Advisor to the Susan G. Komen Foundation.

Pietenpol's research focuses on uncovering the molecular basis of epithelial cancers with an emphasis on the signaling pathways of the p53 family of tumor supressor proteins within breast cancers, specifically in triple-negative breast cancer (TNBC).

Pietenpol is an elected fellow of the American Association for the Advancement of Science (2012) and the American Association for Cancer Research Academy (2022). She served as director of the Vanderbilt-Ingram Cancer Center, Vanderbilt's NCI-designated comprehensive cancer center, from 2007 to 2022. In 2008 she was appointed by President George Bush to serve on the National Cancer Advisory Board for the National Cancer Institute. In 2016 she was selected to serve on then Vice-President Joe Biden's National Cancer Moonshot Program's Blue Ribbon Panel.

== Education ==
Pietenpol studied biology at Carleton College. She received her PhD in cell biology at Vanderbilt University School of Medicine in 1990. She was a postdoc fellow at Johns Hopkins School of Medicine. She became an assistant professor of Biochemistry at Vanderbilt School of Medicine in 1994 and professor of Biochemistry and Otolaryngology in 2002.

== Research ==
Pietenpol and her research group have developed techniques to map p53-chromatin interactions and identify p53-regulated genes. Her team is also responsible for delineating p73 binding sites within the mammal the genome and the discovery that p73, another mammal protein gene, is required for ovarian folliculogenesis, multiciliogenesis, and certain regulation of the Foxj1-associated genes within mammals, which provide insight into inflammatory disease.

Her group successfully classified TNBC into 4 molecular subtypes―basal-like 1 (BL1), basal-like 2 (BL2), mesenchymal (M), and luminal androgen receptor (LAR). This classification framework has been validated and has informed multiple clinical trials.

Recently, she and her team have focused on LAR TNBC, which is a rare subtype of TNBC that expresses androgen receptors, making it difficult to clinically treat.

== Citations ==
Pietenpol has published over 250 scientific papers, which have been cited over 40,000 times, in journals including Nature, Cell, Cancer Research, and The Journal of Clinical Investigation.

== Awards and Affiliations ==
- 1997 – Burroughs Wellcome New Investigator Award in Toxicology
- 2004 – Vanderbilt Excellence in Teaching Award
- 2009 – Johns Hopkins Society of Scholars
- 2009 – Presidential Appointee on the National Cancer Advisory Board
- 2011 – Carleton College Distinguished Alumni Achievement Award
- 2012 – Elected Fellow of the American Assosciation for the Advancement of Science
- 2016 – T.J. Martell Foundation Medical Research Advancement Award
- 2016 – Member of Blue Ribbon Panel for the Vice President's Cancer Moonshot
- 2022 – Harvey Branscomb Distinguished Professor Award at Vanderbilt
- 2022 – Elected Fellow of the American Assosciation for Cancer Research
- 2024 – American Society of Clinical Oncology's Science of Oncology Award
