= Stephen B. Baylin =

American oncologist

Stephen Bruce Baylin is the deputy director and associate director for research at the Sidney Kimmel Comprehensive Cancer Center and Virginia and D.K. Ludwig Professor for Cancer Research and medicine and chief of cancer biology of the Johns Hopkins University School of Medicine. His research focus is epigenetics in the development of cancer, and he was one of the first researchers in this field in the 1980s.

== Education and research ==
Baylin received his BS and MD from Duke University in 1968. Baylin started his research against cancer during the Vietnam war. "They called us the Yellow Berets — MDs who opted to do their public service by engaging in research at the National Institutes of Health. I was interested in an inherited form of thyroid cancer, called medullary thyroid carcinoma." He published his findings in relation to that research in the New England Journal of Medicine in 1970.

== Career ==
After serving as a staff associate for the National Institute of Health's Heart and Lung Institute for two years, Baylin joined the faculty at Johns Hopkins in 1974. In 1986, he was named a professor of oncology, and then became a professor of medicine in 1990. The next year, he was appointed chief of tumor biology.

Baylin and Peter Laird were the original investigators of the epigenetic portion of The Cancer Genome Atlas. He co-leads, with Peter Jones, a Stand Up To Cancer team science initiative in regulatory epigenetics, the VARI-SU2C Epigenetics Dream Team, and as part of this has an appointment to the faculty of the Van Andel Research Institute.

In 2010, he was featured in GQ's "Rock Stars of Science" to publicize biomedical researchers. Baylin, Peter Jones and Andrew Feinberg were awarded the 2022-2023 Harvey Prize in Science and Technology for their seminal contributions to the field of Cancer Epigenetics.

== Awards ==
- 1990 – Edwin B. Astwood Award Lecture, Endocrine Society
- 2004 – National Investigator of the Year Award, National Cancer Institute SPORE Program
- 2005 – Simon M. Shubitz Cancer Prize and Lectureship
- 2008 – David Workman Memorial Award, Samuel Waxman Cancer Research Foundation
- 2008 – Raffaele Tecce Memorial Lecture, Rome
- 2009 – Kirk A. Landon-AACR Prize for Basic Cancer Research
- 2010 – Alfred G. Knudson Award for Excellence in Cancer Genetics, National Cancer Institute
- 2010 – Nakahara Memorial Lecture, Princess Takematsu Symposium
- 2011 – Medal of Honor, American Cancer Society
- 2014 – SU2C Phillip A. Sharp Innovation in Collaboration Award
- 2014 – Elected fellow of the AACR Academy
- 2017 – Elected to the National Academy of Sciences
- 2022-2023 – Harvey Prize in Science and Technology
