= Judy E. Garber =

Medical researcher

- Education: Yale School of Medicine
- Scientific career
- Workplaces: Dana–Farber Cancer Institute/Harvard Medical School

Judy Ellen Garber is the director of the Center for Cancer Genetics and Prevention at the Dana–Farber Cancer Institute and a professor of medicine at Harvard Medical School. Garber previously served as president of the American Association for Cancer Research.

Garber's research focuses on DNA damage in breast cancer.

Garber attended Yale School of Medicine, receiving her MD/MPH in 1981. She did her residency in internal medicine and fellowship in hematology at Brigham and Women's Hospital in Boston.

Garber has been the president of the Center for Cancer Genetics and Prevention at Dana-Farber since 2010. In 2011–2012, Garber served as president of the American Association for Cancer Research. She is a member of the National Cancer Advisory Board and a co-scientific director of the Breast Cancer Research Foundation.

== Awards ==
- 2001 Elected to the American Society for Clinical Investigation
- 2008 Statesman Award, American Society for Clinical Oncology
- 2013 Elected to the National Academy of Medicine.
- 2013 Elected fellow of the AACR Academy
- 2017 Margaret L. Kripke Legend Award, MD Anderson Cancer Center
- 2017 AACR Joseph H. Burchenal Award for Outstanding Achievement in Clinical Cancer Research
- 2018 Giants of Cancer Care, OncLive
- 2019 ASCO - American Cancer Society Award and Lecture
