= Calvert School =

School in Baltimore, Maryland, US

Coordinates: 39°20′24″N 76°37′16″W

- Baltimore, MD; USA

Information
- Type: Private day school
- Motto: Foundation for a Lifetime
- Established: 1897
- Headmaster: Andrew Holmgren
- Faculty: 72 (42 K–4, 30 5–8)
- Enrollment: 602 total (362 K–4, 240 5–8)
- Campus: Urban, 13 acres (5.3 ha)
- Colors: Black and gold
- Athletics: 20 sports
- Mascot: Mighty Bees
- Website: www.calvertschoolmd.org

Calvert School, founded in 1897, is an independent, non-sectarian, co-educational lower and middle school located in Baltimore, Maryland. Calvert School is a member of the National Association of Independent Schools (NAIS) as well as the Association of Independent Maryland and DC Schools (AIMS).

== History ==
Established in 1896 when four Baltimore families hired German school teacher Fraulein Martha Auguste Schurmann to conduct traditional kindergarten classes for their children, Calvert School continues to build upon the foundation laid by Fraulein Schurmann. The first children were taught above Croft and Conlin's drug store. In 1899, Calvert School hired its first Headmaster, Virgil M. Hillyer, a Harvard graduate.

=== School design ===
Calvert School's current Lower School on Tuscany Road was designed by Hillyer along with Laurence Hall Fowler. Hillyer insisted on larger windows so that rooms would be pleasant to children and let in light and air. His design included details such as having the ends of benches in the assembly hall carved with animal, based on figures used on buildings in the Middle Ages to ward off evil spirits. The lockers were decorated with a pear or jug or a cup and saucer, each to illustrate one of Hillyer's favorite lessons. Many of the details that Hillyer influenced are still present.

== Timeline of history ==
1896 – Issac Dixon and his wife start a German kindergarten for four children in the Dixon home on Park Avenue;

1897 – Boys’ and Girls’ Primary School is inaugurated with fifteen children.

1899 – School name formally changed to “Calvert Primary School of Baltimore City”.

1901 – Students move to 10 West Chase Street building with a rooftop garden.

1903 – The first graduating class of Calvert School.

1907 – The original Calvert silhouetted head logo created.

1924 – Calvert School moves to Tuscany Road location.

1979 – Calvert expands space to include Library, Science, Art, and Planetarium.

1987 – Luetkemeyer Wing opens.

1997 – Calvert celebrates its Centennial.

2000 - Calvert School's Board of Trustees approved the addition of a Middle School;

2002 – Middle School established.

2004 – The first graduating class of the Middle School.

== Heads of school ==
• Virgil M. Hillyer (1899–1931)

• Donald W. Goodrich (1931–1940)

• Edward W. Brown (1940–1967)

• William Kirk (1967–1983)

• Merrill S. Hall III (1983–2004)

• Andrew D. Martire ’83 (2004–2013)

• Andrew Holmgren (2013–Present)

== Academics ==
As of 2016, Calvert School serves over 600 boys and girls beginning in Fifth Age through eighth grade. In Lower School, students are grouped by age, not grade. The students are grouped according to the age that they turn in during the school year. Students learn reading and math, a foreign language, and the formal Calvert Script. An upper school placement term begins in seventh grade, and in eighth-grade students meet with a placement coordinator throughout the fall and winter.

There is a student leadership program for middle schoolers. As of seventh grade, students can apply for positions as school leaders. Once selected, these leaders serve as Calvert Captains, Diversity Club coordinators, and members of the Black & Gold Committee. Middle school students also have a Middle School Advisory where each student is a member of a single-sex homeroom. During homeroom, the advisor/homeroom teacher monitors each student's academic and social progress during three, twenty-five-minute sessions per week.

Students participate in a variety of projects, such as stream cleans and writing letters to troops. Projects are completed in a variety of settings and are tailored to the age group participating.

== Athletics ==
Lower School students meet for physical education classes multiple times a week. Once the children reach Ninth Age, they join teams called the Crows, Canaries, Hoppers, or Crickets. These are single-gender groups that compete with each other throughout the year in sporting matches.

Middle School includes over twenty sports teams spread over three seasons. More than 90% of students participate in team sports, which include football, flag football, field hockey, soccer, basketball, squash, lacrosse, baseball, and cross country. Fifth graders may also participate in an intramural program.

== Home Instruction Division ==
The Calvert Home Instruction Division was originally developed by the school's first headmaster, Virgil Hillyer, in 1905, and is widely considered the first of its kind. The homeschooling program grew from a handful of students in the early years to over 10,000 per year by the 1990s and enrolled students in all 50 states and hundreds of countries throughout the world. In 2001, the homeschooling program became Calvert Education Services and in 2013 was sold to a private owner. Calvert Education Services is no longer affiliated with the day school.

== Notable alumni ==
- Margaret Barker, actress
- Julie Bowen, award-winning actress.
- John Rawls, philosopher.
- Frances Scott Fitzgerald, writer and daughter of F. Scott Fitzgerald.
- John Waters, film director, screenwriter, author, comedian, journalist, and visual artist.
- Eric Puchner, novelist and short story writer.
- Frank Deford, sportswriter and novelist.
- Carol Graham, Leo Pasvolsky Senior Fellow at the Brookings Institution; faculty member at the School of Public Policy at the University of Maryland; research fellow at the Institute for the Study of Labor (IZA); author of numerous books, papers and edited volume chapters in public policy.
- Peyton List, actress and model.
- William P. Carey, philanthropist and businessman.
- Keith Flaherty, director of Developmental Therapeutics at the Massachusetts General Hospital Cancer Center and associate professor of medicine at Harvard Medical School.
