= Clinical Cancer Research =

- Cover of Volume 26, Issue 14
- Discipline: Oncology
- Language: English
- Edited by: Keith Flaherty

Publication details
- History: 1995–present
- Publisher: American Association for Cancer Research (United States)
- Frequency: Biweekly
- Open access: Delayed, after 12 months
- Impact factor: 13.801 (2021)

Standard abbreviations
- ISO 4: Clin. Cancer Res.

Indexing
- CODEN: CCREF
- ISSN: 1078-0432 (print); 1557-3265 (web)
- OCLC no.: 30960261

Links
- Journal homepage; Online access; Online archive

Clinical Cancer Research is a peer-reviewed medical journal on oncology, including the cellular and molecular characterization, prevention, diagnosis, and therapy of human cancer, medical and hematological oncology, radiation therapy, pediatric oncology, pathology, surgical oncology, and clinical genetics. The applications of the disciplines of pharmacology, immunology, cell biology, and molecular genetics to intervention in human cancer are also included. One of the main interests of Clinical Cancer Research is on clinical trials that evaluate new treatments together with research on pharmacology and molecular alterations or biomarkers that predict response or resistance to treatment. Another priority for Clinical Cancer Research is laboratory and animal studies of new drugs as well as molecule-targeted agents with the potential to lead to clinical trials, and studies of targetable mechanisms of oncogenesis, progression of the malignant phenotype, and metastatic disease. The journal is published by the American Association for Cancer Research.

== History ==
The first issue of Clinical Cancer Research was published in January 1995. By 1 December 1994, 128 manuscripts had been submitted for publication by investigators representing a variety of clinical and laboratory disciplines not only from the United States but also from the international research community. In 1998, the number of manuscripts submitted had risen from 500 in the first year to almost 800. The journal reported an acceptance rate of 52% at that time. With the aim to publish only papers of high quality, the editors decided to increase the stringency of review.

== Abstracting and indexing ==
The journal is abstracted and indexed in Chemical Abstracts, Index Medicus, MEDLINE, Science Citation Index, and Current Contents/Clinical Medicine. According to the Journal Citation Reports, the journal has a 2013 impact factor of 8.193, ranking it 13th out of 202 journals in the category "Oncology".
