= Harold L. Moses =

American oncologist

- Education: Berea College; Vanderbilt University School of Medicine
- Scientific career
- Fields: oncology
- Workplaces: Mayo Clinic; National Institutes of Health; Vanderbilt-Ingram Cancer Center

Harold L. Moses is the Ingram Professor of Cancer Research, Professor of Cancer Biology, Medicine and Pathology, and director emeritus at the Vanderbilt-Ingram Cancer Center. He was president of the American Association for Cancer Research in 1991.

== Career ==
Moses graduated from Berea College in 1958 and from Vanderbilt University School of Medicine in 1962 with an MD. He completed his residency at Vanderbilt and did a postdoctoral fellowship at the National Institutes of Health. He then served as a faculty member at Vanderbilt for five years and then at the Mayo Clinic for twelve, where he was the chair of the department of cell biology. He returned to Vanderbilt where he was the chair of cell biology and the founding director of the Vanderbilt Cancer Center. He stepped down as director in 2004.

== Research ==
Moses' research focuses on TGF beta in cancer.

== Awards ==
- 1991 Rous-Whipple Award, American Association of Pathologists
- 2003 Elected Member, Institute of Medicine
- 2003-2005 President, Association of American Cancer Institutes
- 2009 T J Martell Foundation Lifetime Medical Research Award
- 2010 T J Martell Foundation Lifetime Scientific Achievement Award
- 2013 Fellow of the AACR Academy
- 2013 Lifetime Achievement Award, American Association for Cancer Research
- 2016 Elected Fellow, National Academy of Inventors
