= Fang-Fang Yin =

Chinese-born radiation oncologist

Fang-Fang Yin is a Chinese-born radiologist.

Yin earned a Bachelor of Science degree from Zhejiang University in 1982. He subsequently moved to the United States, completing a Master of Science degree at Bowling Green State University in 1987, followed by a doctorate at the University of Chicago in 1992. Yin teaches at Duke University, where he is affiliated with the Duke Cancer Institute, and was appointed the Gustavo S. Montana Professor of Radiation Oncology in 2021.
