= Omid Veiseh =

Academic background
- Education: BS, Western Washington University; PhD, Materials Science and Engineering and Nanotechnology, 2009, University of Washington, PostDoc, MIT

Academic work
- Institutions: Rice University
- Website: veisehlab.rice.edu

Omid Veiseh is an American biomaterials researcher and entrepreneur. As a postdoctorate candidate at MIT, he co-founded Siglion Therapeutics, a biotechnology company which would commercialize the discoveries he and his co-founders developed. In 2016, Veiseh was offered a faculty position in the Department of Bioengineering at Rice University.

== Early life and education ==
Veiseh earned his Bachelor of Science degree from Western Washington University and his PhD from the University of Washington. Upon completing his PhD, Veiseh completed his post-doctoral research at MIT's Koch Institute for Integrative Cancer Research where he co-developed a way to reduce immune-system rejection using biomedical devices. While at MIT, he co-founded Sigilon Therapeutics, a biotechnology company which would commercialize the discoveries he and his co-founders developed.

== Career ==
Veiseh left MIT in 2016, after Rice University won a $2 million grant from the Cancer Prevention and Research Institute of Texas to recruit him to their Department of Bioengineering. As an assistant professor of bioengineering, Veiseh and his laboratory earned funding from the National Institutes of Health to design hydrogel-encapsulated cells can sense blood glucose levels and produce insulin on demand. He also collaborated with Jordan Miller to combine cell-based therapy applications with 3D-printed technologies for use in Type-1 diabetes therapies.

While at Rice, Veiseh's Sigilon Therapeutics partnered with Eli Lilly and Company to develop "living drug factories" that could be safely implanted in the body and produce insulin. As a result of his efforts, Veiseh was recognized by MedTech Boston on their 40 under 40 Healthcare Innovators in 2017. Individually, he also worked alongside Ravi Ghanta to develop a novel biomaterial improve the cells’ ability to heal heart injuries.
