= Isaiah J. Fidler =

Israeli-American cancer researcher (1936–2020)

Isaiah Joshua Fidler
- Josh Fidler at the Frederick Cancer Research Center, 1980
- Born: December 4, 1936; Jerusalem, Israel
- Died: May 8, 2020 (aged 83); Houston, Texas
- Education: Oklahoma State University (DVM); University of Pennsylvania (PhD)
- Known for: Demonstrating the role of tumor cell heterogeneity in metastasis
- Awards: AACR-G.H.A. Clowes Memorial Award (1988); American Cancer Society Medal of Honor (2013)
- Scientific career
- Fields: Cancer metastasis
- Workplaces: University of Pennsylvania; National Cancer Institute; University of Texas MD Anderson Cancer Center

Isaiah Joshua Fidler (December 4, 1936 – May 8, 2020), known as Josh Fidler, was an Israeli-American cancer researcher who specialized in the biology of cancer metastasis. He spent much of his career at the University of Texas MD Anderson Cancer Center in Houston, where he was a professor and chair of the Department of Cancer Biology. His research helped establish the importance of tumor cell heterogeneity in metastasis, and contributed to the understanding of interactions between metastatic cancer cells and the tissue to which they disseminate. Fidler was the recipient of numerous honors for his contributions to cancer research.

== Early life and education ==
Fidler was born on December 4, 1936, in Jerusalem. After completing his schooling and military service in Israel, Fidler moved to the United States to attend graduate school. He received a Doctor of Veterinary Medicine degree from Oklahoma State University in 1963 and a PhD in human pathology from the University of Pennsylvania in 1970, working under Peter Nowell and Irv Zeidman. While at the University of Pennsylvania, Fidler began studying the biology of tumor metastasis, where he examined the fate of tumor cells after they entered the circulation, and the factors determining whether they survived to form metastatic colonies.

== Career ==
After completing his doctoral training in 1970, Fidler held academic appointments at the University of Pennsylvania. In 1975, he joined the National Cancer Institute (NCI) at the Frederick Cancer Research Center in Maryland, where he became head of the Biology of Metastasis Section. He subsequently became director of the Cancer Metastasis and Treatment Laboratory. In 1983, Fidler moved to the University of Texas MD Anderson Cancer Center in Houston. He subsequently became chair of the Department of Cancer Biology and established the Cancer Metastasis Research Center. He remained at MD Anderson for the remainder of his career and became professor emeritus in 2019.

Fidler also held leadership positions in the cancer research community. He served as president of the American Association for Cancer Research from 1984 to 1985 and was active in international organizations devoted to cancer research and metastasis.

On top of his research and leadership, Fidler also served as a mentor for many students and is known for his ability to guide and lead graduate, postdoctoral, and clinical students.

== Research ==
=== Tumor heterogeneity and metastasis ===
Fidler's early research focused on the observation that although large numbers of tumor cells can enter the circulation, only a small proportion survive and successfully establish metastatic tumors. His studies suggested that metastatic spread was not simply a random process but depended on biological differences among tumor cells. In the 1970s, Fidler while at a conference met immunologist Margaret Kripke, who became a scientific collaborator and who he married in 1975. In a landmark 1977 paper published in Science, Fidler and Kripke demonstrated that different clones derived from the same mouse melanoma could differ substantially in their ability to form metastases. The study supported the hypothesis that highly metastatic tumor-cell variants could already exist within a heterogeneous tumor population. This study and others contributed to a shift in the understanding of metastasis from a process viewed primarily as a consequence of tumor progression toward one in which the properties of individual tumor cells within the population, and their interactions with the host could determine metastatic potential.

=== Organ-specific metastasis ===
Fidler also investigated why cancer cells preferentially metastasize to particular organs. His research with colleagues showed that tumor cells could differ in their ability to colonize different tissues, supporting the idea that metastatic dissemination involved interactions between properties of tumor cells and characteristics of particular organs. In a 1980 Nature article with George Poste, Fidler proposed a model of cancer metastasis emphasizing the biological selection of tumor-cell populations capable of surviving and growing in particular host environments. His subsequent work contributed to the modern interpretation of Stephen Paget's "seed and soil hypothesis", in which metastatic cancer cells are influenced both by properties of the tumor cells and by the environments of the organs in which they disseminate.

Based on these findings, Fidler became increasingly interested in the role of the host tissue and tumor microenvironment in determining the fate of disseminated cancer cells. His research examined how interactions between cancer cells, stromal cells, blood vessels, and other components of tissues influence metastatic growth. Fidler argued that successful metastasis required more than the dissemination of tumor cells from a primary tumor. Cancer cells had to survive in the circulation, reach distant tissues, adapt to their new environment, and establish a supportive microenvironment in which they could proliferate.

Fidler published more than 800 scientific papers and book chapters during his career.

== Honors and awards ==
Among Fidler's major honors were:

- 1988: AACR-G.H.A. Clowes Memorial Award Outstanding Basic Cancer Research
- 1997: Gold Medal for Biological Sciences, World Health Organization
- 1999: Bristol-Myers Squibb Award for Distinguished Achievement in Cancer Research
- 2007: Fellow, American Association for the Advancement of Science
- 2013: Distinguished Service Award and Medal of Honor in Basic Research, American Cancer Society
- 2013: Inaugural Fellow of the AACR Academy
- 2016: Gold-Headed Cane Award, American Society for Investigative Pathology
- 2018: Margaret Foti Award for Leadership and Extraordinary Achievements in Cancer Research, American Association for Cancer Research

== Death ==
Fidler died on May 8, 2020, at the age of 83. He was survived by his wife, Margaret Kripke, and two daughters.

== Selected publications ==
- Fidler, I. J.; Kripke, M. L. (1977). "Metastasis results from preexisting variant cells within a malignant tumor." Science. 197 (4306): 893–895.
- Fidler, I. J.; Poste, G. (1980). "The pathogenesis of cancer metastasis." Nature. 283: 139–146.
- Fidler, I. J. (2003). "The pathogenesis of cancer metastasis: the 'seed and soil' hypothesis revisited." Nature Reviews Cancer. 3: 453–458.
- Fidler, I. J.; Kripke, M. L. (2015). "The challenge of targeting metastasis." Cancer Metastasis Reviews.
