= DarwinHealth =

American biomedical company

- Type: Private
- Founded: 2015
- Founders: Andrea Califano; Gideon Bosker
- Headquarters: New York, United States
- Website: darwinhealth.com

DarwinHealth is an American biomedical company that uses algorithms and mathematical models in combination with wet lab experiments to develop cancer medicine. It is headquartered in New York, U.S.

== History ==
DarwinHealth was founded in 2015 by Andrea Califano and Gideon Bosker. Their collaboration began after a meeting in the British Virgin Islands in 2013. The company's approach is to utilize algorithms developed in the Califano Lab at Columbia University to help physicians identify transcription factors in tumors and to predict potential drug targets and treatments.

In 2018, Daiichi Sankyo and DarwinHealth entered into a research collaboration centered on identifying novel cancer targets.

In 2019, DarwinHealth and Celgene entered into a scientific collaboration to prioritize the oncology-relevant bioactivity of oncology compounds using its algorithmic framework with the goal of identifying their mechanism of action (MOA) against Master Regulator (MR) proteins.

In 2021, Bristol Myers Squibb collaborated with DarwinHealth to explore compounds that might target master regulators within their compound library. In October 2021, DarwinHealth and Prelude Therapeutics collaborated to identify biomarkers for oncology drug trials.

== Research ==
In 2016, Andrea Califano of DarwinHealth, together with his colleague Mariano Alvarez, introduced the concept of "oncotecture" in a paper published in Nature Reviews Cancer. They elucidated "master regulator" proteins that consistently impact tumor development across various patients. By analyzing gene-expression profiles from 20,000 tumor samples, Califano identified approximately 300 potential master regulators across 36 tumor types. These proteins primarily influence transcription.

In 2019, in a New England Journal of Medicine article titled, "Oral Selinexor–Dexamethasone for Triple-Class Refractory Multiple Myeloma", analyzed patients from the STORM clinical trial for multiple myeloma. In this trial, patients were treated with the XPO1 inhibitor selinexor. DarwinHealth scientists identified a Linear Discriminant Analysis (LDA) classifier using VIPER-assessed activity of only four proteins (IRF3, ARL2BP, ZBTB17, and ATRX). The DarwinOncoMarker achieved a predictability measure (AUC = 0.862) in distinguishing responders from non-responders, a finding also confirmed in an independent cohort.

In 2022, researchers from DarwinHealth published a paper in Current Protocols outlining the methodologies of the DarwinOncoDiscovery cancer drug discovery platform. The protocol identifies tumor checkpoint MRs from patient samples and selects relevant in vitro and in vivo models to discern tissue-specific drug MOAs. This method refines preclinical drug validations, enhancing the selection process for clinical trial participants.

In 2024, DarwinHealth applied its VIPER algorithm, an artificial intelligence tool, to analyze tumor gene expression data and assess how existing drugs might interact with specific cancer-related proteins. The platform was used in clinical trials for rare and treatment-resistant cancers, such as renal carcinoma, gastroenteropancreatic neuroendocrine tumors, breast cancer, prostate cancer, and pancreatic carcinoma. Pharmaceutical companies, including Bristol Myers Squibb, incorporated the technology to examine over 1,500 oncology-related compounds. Published trial results from 2024 indicated that the DarwinOncoTarget tool correctly predicted patient responses to HDAC6 inhibitors in breast cancer cases. The DarwinOncoTreat tool showed a 91% accuracy rate in predicting treatment responses across multiple tumor types.

== Products and services ==
- OncoTarget
- OncoTreat
