= Michael B. Kastan =

- Occupations: Professor of pharmacology and cancer biology

Academic background
- Education: University of North Carolina at Chapel Hill; Washington University in St. Louis

Michael B. Kastan is the executive director of the Duke Cancer Institute and professor of pharmacology and cancer biology.

== Career ==
Kastan received his bachelor's degree in chemistry from the University of North Carolina at Chapel Hill and his MD and PhD from Washington University School of Medicine in 1984. He did a residency in pediatrics at Johns Hopkins Hospital.

In 2004, he became director of the Comprehensive Cancer Center at St. Jude Children's Research Hospital, where he worked until moving to Duke to lead the Duke Cancer Institute in 2011. He was the editor-in-chief of Molecular Cancer Research from 2002 to 2012.

Kastan's research is focused on cell signaling and DNA damage and repair mechanisms in cancer.

=== Awards ===
- 1995 Elected to the American Society for Clinical Investigation
- 1999 Stohlman Award, Leukemia Society of America
- 2003 Elected member, Association of American Physicians
- 2014 Elected fellow, American Academy of Arts and Sciences
- 2014 Elected fellow, American Association for the Advancement of Science
- 2016 Elected to the National Academy of Sciences
- 2017 Elected fellow of the AACR Academy
