= Andrea Califano =

Italian-born American systems biologist

- Education: University of Florence
- Awards: Member of the National Academy of Medicine (since 2018); Fellow of the AAAS (since 2015); Fellow of the ISCB (since 2017); Fellow of the AACR (since 2024); Fellow of the IEEE (since 1997)
- Scientific career
- Fields: Systems biology, Computational biology, Cancer genetics
- Workplaces: Chan Zuckerberg Biohub; Columbia University Irving Medical Center
- Website: califano.c2b2.columbia.edu

Andrea Califano is a systems biologist. He is the Clyde and Helen Wu Professor of Chemical and Systems Biology at Columbia University Irving Medical Center, where he also holds appointments in the Departments of Biochemistry and Molecular Biophysics, Biomedical Informatics, and Medicine. Califano serves as the president of the Chan Zuckerberg Biohub New York.

== Early life and education ==
Califano was born in Naples, Italy. He earned a Ph.D. in physics from the University of Florence in 1986 and completed postdoctoral training in optics at the Istituto Nazionale di Ottica in Florence, information mechanics at the Massachusetts Institute of Technology, and computational biology at the IBM T.J. Watson Research Center.

== Career ==
Califano began his career at IBM, where he established the company’s first Computational Biology group in 1990 and later became program director of the IBM Computational Biology Center in 1997. In 2000, he co-founded First Genetic Trust, a pharmacogenomics company focused on human polymorphisms and drug response.

He joined Columbia University in 2003 as Professor of Biomedical Informatics and was later named the Clyde and Helen Wu Professor of Chemical and Systems Biology. He founded the Department of Systems Biology in 2013, serving as its first chair until 2023. Califano also held leadership positions at the Herbert Irving Comprehensive Cancer Center, including Associate Director for Bioinformatics from 2007 to 2019 and Co-Leader of the Cancer Regulatory Network and Precision Oncology and Systems Biology Programs.

In 2010, Califano co-founded Therasis, a systems biology-based company focused on novel cancer treatments, and in 2015 co-founded DarwinHealth, a biotechnology company leveraging proprietary algorithms developed in his laboratory for precision oncology.

Califano is a contributor to website EXPeditions.

In 2023, he became President of the Chan Zuckerberg Biohub New York, an initiative dedicated to re-engineering the human immune system to detect and prevent cancer and neurodegenerative diseases.

== Research ==
Califano is known for pioneering the use of mammalian regulatory networks in modeling cancer-related phenotypes and identifying master regulator proteins that control cellular states. He introduced the OncoTecture hypothesis and formulated the Information Canalization Theory, which explains how conserved regulatory modules maintain homeostasis in both normal and diseased cells.

His laboratory developed several influential computational tools, including:

ARACNe – an algorithm for reconstructing gene regulatory networks using information theory.

VIPER – a framework for inferring protein activity from gene expression data to identify master regulators.

OncoTarget and OncoTreat – mRNA-based clinical decision tools for predicting optimal cancer therapies, both approved under CLIA by the New York and California Departments of Health.

These algorithms have been cited extensively and have been applied in more than ten clinical trials in precision oncology. Califano’s group has mentored over 120 graduate students and postdoctoral researchers.

=== OncoTecture and master regulators ===
Califano’s work has shown that cancer cell transcriptional states are maintained by small sets of autoregulated proteins known as master regulators, which form tumor checkpoint modules. These modules integrate the effects of numerous genetic alterations to produce stable cell phenotypes. Targeting these master regulators can reprogram or eliminate tumor cells, providing new therapeutic avenues beyond traditional mutation-driven approaches.

== Editorial and advisory roles ==
Califano serves as a scientific editor for Cancer Discovery, Cell Systems, and Science Signaling. He has served on advisory boards for the National Cancer Institute, St. Jude Children's Research Hospital, Koch Institute for Integrative Cancer Research, and Thermo Fisher Scientific.

== Honors and awards ==
- NCI Outstanding Investigator Award (R35) in 2015 and 2022
- AAAS Fellow (2015)
- ISCB Fellow (2017)
- Member of the National Academy of Medicine (2018)
- Ruth Leff prize in pancreatic cancer research(2019)
- Alfred G. Knudson prize in Cancer Genetics (2023)
- Fellow of the AACR Academy (2024)
- Stanley P. Reimann Honor Award, Fox Chase Cancer Center (2025)

== Selected publications ==
- Basso, Katia; Margolin, Adam A; Stolovitzky, Gustavo; Klein, Ulf; Dalla-Favera, Riccardo; Califano, Andrea (April 2005). "Reverse engineering of regulatory networks in human B cells". Nature Genetics. 37 (4): 382–390. doi:10.1038/ng1532. ISSN 1061-4036. PMID 15778709.
- Sumazin, P; Yang, X; Chiu, H-S; Chung, W-J; Iyer, A; Llobet‑Navas, D; Rajbhandari, P; Bansal, M; Guarnieri, P; Silva, J; Califano, A (October 2011). "An extensive microRNA‑mediated network of RNA–RNA interactions regulates established oncogenic pathways in glioblastoma". Cell. 147 (2): 370–381. doi:10.1016/j.cell.2011.09.029. PMC 3214599. PMID 22000015.
- Chen, James C.; Alvarez, Mariano J.; Talos, Flaminia; Dhruv, Harshil; Rieckhof, Gabrielle E.; Iyer, Archana; Diefes, Kristin L.; Aldape, Kenneth; Berens, Michael; Shen, Michael M.; Califano, Andrea (October 2014). "Identification of causal genetic drivers of human disease through systems‑level analysis of regulatory networks". Cell. 159 (2): 402–414. doi:10.1016/j.cell.2014.09.021. PMC 4194029. PMID 25303533.
- Woo, Jung Hoon; Shimoni, Yishai; Yang, Wan Seok; Subramaniam, Prem S.; Iyer, Archana; Nicoletti, Paola; Rodríguez Martínez, María; López, Gonzalo; Mattioli, Michela; Realubit, Ronald B.; Karan, Charles; Stockwell, Brent R.; Bansal, Mukesh; Califano, Andrea (July 2015). "Elucidating compound mechanism of action by network perturbation analysis". Cell. 162 (2): 441–451. doi:10.1016/j.cell.2015.05.056. PMC 4506491. PMID 26186195.
- Alvarez, Mariano J; Shen, Yao; Giorgi, Federico M; Lachmann, Alexander; Ding, B Belinda; Ye, B Hilda; Califano, Andrea (August 2016). "Functional characterization of somatic mutations in cancer using network-based inference of protein activity". Nature Genetics. 48 (8): 838–847. doi:10.1038/ng.3593. hdl:11585/657580. ISSN 1546-1718. PMC 5040167. PMID 27322546.
- Alvarez MJ, Subramaniam PS, Tang LH, et al.Alvarez, M. J.; et al. (July 2018). "A precision oncology approach to the pharmacological targeting of mechanistic dependencies in neuroendocrine tumors". Nature Genetics. 50 (7): 979–989. doi:10.1038/s41588-018-0138-4. hdl:10044/1/60492. ISSN 1546-1718. PMC 6421579. PMID 29915428.
- Paull, Evan O.; Aytes, Alvaro; Jones, Sunny J.; Subramaniam, Prem S.; Giorgi, Federico M.; Douglass, Eugene F.; Tagore, Somnath; Chu, Brennan; Vasciaveo, Alessandro; Zheng, Siyuan; Verhaak, Roel; Abate‑Shen, Cory; Alvarez, Mariano J.; Califano, Andrea (January 2021). "A modular master regulator landscape controls cancer transcriptional identity". Cell. 184 (2): 334–351.e20. doi:10.1016/j.cell.2020.11.045. PMC 8103356. PMID 33434495.
- Mundi PS, Dela Cruz FS, Grunn A, et al. Mundi, P. S.; et al. (2 June 2023). "A Transcriptome-Based Precision Oncology Platform for Patient-Therapy Alignment in a Diverse Set of Treatment-Resistant Malignancies". Cancer Discovery. 13 (6): 1386–1407. doi:10.1158/2159-8290.CD-22-1020. ISSN 2159-8290. PMC 10239356. PMID 37061969.
