= Carol Prives =

Canadian biologist

- Education: BSc McGill University, Canada PhD McGill University, Canada Honorary Doctor of Sciences McGill University, Canada
- Alma mater: McGill University
- Known for: The characterization of p53, an important tumour suppressor protein frequently mutated in cancer.
- Awards: NIH MERIT Award (1996) Rosalind E. Franklin Award for Women in Science, National Cancer Institute (2009) Paul Janssen Prize in Biotechnology and Medicine (2010) AACR-Women in Cancer Research Charlotte Friend Memorial Lectureship (2011)
- Scientific career
- Institutions: Albert Einstein College of Medicine; Weizmann Institute; Columbia University

Professor Carol L. Prives FRS is the Da Costa Professor of Biological Sciences at Columbia University. She is known for her work in the characterisation of p53, an important tumor suppressor protein frequently mutated in cancer.

Professor Prives is an elected member of the National Academy of Sciences (elected in 2008).

== Education ==
Prives was educated in Canada, received her BSc and PhD in 1966 from McGill University, undertaking research in the lab of Juda Hirsch Quastel. She pursued postdoctoral fellowships at Albert Einstein College of Medicine and the Weizmann Institute under the mentorship of Professor Michel Revel. after which she became a faculty member at the Weizmann Institute. She received an honorary Doctor of Sciences degree from McGill University, her alma mater, on 29 May 2014 for her contributions to the understanding of p53.

== Research and career ==
In 1995, she was appointed as the Da Costa Professor of Biology at Columbia University. She was the chair of the Department of Biological Sciences from 2000 to 2004.

Her early interest in the SV40 DNA tumour virus as a model for eukaryotic gene expression and oncogenic transformation led her to the study of p53. Since the late 1980s, her lab has focused on the p53 tumour suppressor gene, one of the most frequently mutated in human cancers.

Prives has served as chair of the Experimental Virology and the Cell and Molecular Pathology study sections of the National Institutes of Health. She has been a member of the Scientific Advisory Boards of the Dana–Farber Cancer Institute, the Memorial Sloan Kettering Cancer Center, the Massachusetts General Cancer Center, the National Cancer Institute, and the Weizmann Institute. She was a member of the board of directors of the American Association for Cancer Research from 2004 to 2007. She also served on the Life Sciences jury for the Infosys Prize in 2010.

She is a member of the editorial boards of Cell, Oncogene and the Proceedings of the National Academy of Sciences.

== Awards ==
- 1996 NIH MERIT Award
- 2000 Elected Fellow, American Academy of Arts and Sciences
- 2001 Elected Fellow, American Academy of Microbiology
- 2005 Elected Member, Institute of Medicine
- 2008 Elected Member, National Academy of Sciences
- 2009 Rosalind E. Franklin Award for Women in Science, National Cancer Institute
- 2010 Paul Janssen Prize in Biotechnology and Medicine, Center for Advanced Biotechnology and Medicine
- 2011 AACR-Women in Cancer Research Charlotte Friend Memorial Lectureship
- 2015 Elected Fellow, AACR Academy
- 2020 Elected Fellow, The Royal Society
- 2021 Recipient of AACR-G.H.A. Clowes Award for Outstanding Basic Cancer Research
