= Eun-Sil Shelley Hwang =

American breast cancer oncologist

Academic background
- Education: M.D., 1991, David Geffen School of Medicine at UCLA; M.P.H., 2006, University of California at Berkeley

Eun-Sil Shelley Hwang is an American breast cancer oncologist. She is the Mary and Deryl Hart Professor of Surgery at the Duke Cancer Institute and Duke's first female chief of breast surgery. She was named one of Time magazine's 100 Most Influential People for 2016.

== Education ==
Hwang earned her M.D. in 1991 from the David Geffen School of Medicine at UCLA and her M.P.H. in 2006 from the University of California at Berkeley. She first decided to pursue a career in medicine during her junior year of college.

== Career ==
From 2004 until 2009, Hwang worked as an associate professor in residence and surgery at the University of California, San Francisco. In her first year, she was awarded the 2004 Susan G. Komen Foundation "local hero" award for her contributions to breast cancer research. Later, she collaborated with the National Cancer Institute Breast Cancer Surveillance Consortium to study data from seven mammography registries across the United States. The researchers concluded that the risk of invasive cancer was directly associated with high breast density in the contralateral breast.

In 2011, Hwang, Lisa M. Coussens, and Hope S. Rugo received a $6.5 million grant to study why breast cancer is more deadly for African American women than white women. She also began studying whether hormone drugs, such as tamoxifen, could allow patients with ductal carcinoma in situ to avoid surgery.

In 2016, Hwang was chosen to lead the first United States based study on how to manage pre-cancers of the breast titled Comparison of Operative to Medical Endocrine Therapy. The study focused on whether treatments for ductal carcinoma in situ were necessary or helpful in reducing the spread of the canercous tumours. Her focus on treatments for ductal carcinoma in situ reflect a conservative approach as she feels women are too often quick to choose mastectomies and suffer emotionally and physically afterwards. By May, she was named one of Time magazine's 100 most influential people of the year. As a result of her research success, Hwang was elected to the National Comprehensive Cancer Network (NCCN) Breast Cancer Risk Reduction Panel and a Hedwig van Ameringen Executive Leadership in Academic Medicine (ELAM) Program Fellow.

On May 3, 2019, Hwang was promoted to the Mary and Deryl Hart Distinguished Professorship of Surgery at the Duke Cancer Institute.
