= George D. Demetri =

Born	1956
- Poughkeepsie, New York, U.S.A.
Education	Harvard College (A.B.)
- Stanford University School of Medicine (M.D.)
Occupation	Physician-scientist, medical oncologist
Employer	Dana-Farber Cancer Institute
Academic Affiliation Known for	Harvard Medical School Development of targeted therapies for gastrointestinal stromal tumors (GIST) and other sarcomas
Titles	Senior Vice President for Experimental Therapeutics, Dana-Farber Cancer Institute
- Co-Director, Ludwig Center at Harvard Director, Bertarelli Rare Cancer Initiative, Harvard Medical School
- Professor of Medicine, Harvard Medical School
Major Awards	David A. Karnofsky Memorial Award of the Americal Society of Clinical Oncology (ASCO) (2020)
- Fellow of the American Association for Cancer Research Academy
- Fellow of the American Society of Clinical Oncology (FASCO)
Website	https://www.dana-farber.org/find-a-doctor/george-d-demetri

George Daniel Demetri, M.D. (born 1956) is an American physician-scientist and medical oncologist specializing in researching and treating sarcomas, specifically gastrointestinal stromal tumors (GIST). A professor of medicine at Harvard Medical School, he also serves as the senior vice president for experimental therapeutics at Dana-Farber Cancer Institute (DFCI) and as director of the Bertarelli Rare Cancer Initiative at Harvard Medical School. He is widely recognized for his groundbreaking work in developing molecularly targeted therapies, including imatinib (Gleevec) and sunitinib (Sutent), which have transformed the standard of care for patients with GIST.

Early life and education

Demetri was born in Poughkeepsie, New York. He earned an A.B. degree magna cum laude in biochemical sciences from Harvard College in 1978, where he was a member of Phi Beta Kappa. He received his M.D. from Stanford University School of Medicine in 1983.

He completed his residency in internal medicine at the University of Washington in Seattle, followed by a fellowship in medical oncology at Dana-Farber Cancer Institute and Harvard Medical School.

Career

Demetri then joined the faculty at Harvard Medical School, rising to the rank of professor of medicine in 2012. He has been an attending physician at Dana-Farber since 1989.

Administrative leadership

Demetri has held numerous leadership positions at Dana-Farber, including serving as the founding director of the Sarcoma Center for 30 years, from 1994 to 2024. He currently holds the title of senior vice president for experimental therapeutics. Since 2006, he has also served as the (first) director of Harvard's Ludwig Center, one of six cancer research centers funded by the endowment of the Virginia and D.K. Ludwig Fund for Cancer Research, which evolved from the Ludwig Institute for Cancer Research. In 2025, Demetri was also named director of the Bertarelli Rare Cancer Initiative at Harvard Medical School.

Research and clinical contributions

Demetri's career has involved translating insights in molecular biology into new treatments for sarcomas, a family of cancers that arise in tissues such as muscle and bone, and extrapolating findings from those learnings into other types of cancer.

His work was instrumental in the development of imatinib (Gleevec) as the first effective targeted therapy for GIST, a rare form of soft tissue sarcoma that starts in the wall of the digestive tract, most commonly the stomach or small intestine. GIST is driven by random mutations, most typically in KIT or PDGFRA genes. Demetri led the pivotal Phase 1 and Phase 2 clinical trials that demonstrated the drug's efficacy and were critical for the U.S. Food and Drug Administration (FDA) approval of that drug as the first effective therapy for GIST in 2002. He also played a central role in the clinical development of sunitinib (Sutent®) and regorafenib (Stivarga®) as effective treatments for GIST following the development of drug resistance to imatinib.

In 2003, he designed and conducted a global trial for the marine-derived anticancer drug Trabectedin (Yondelis®), leading to its approval in Europe for advanced sarcomas. Trabectedin was approved in 2015 by the U.S. Food and Drug Administration (FDA) for treatment of liposarcomas and leiomyosarcomas based on a separate randomized trial that he led.

Demetri's research has extended to other targeted therapies, including the discovery and development of the mutant BRAF inhibitor vemurafenib (Zelboraf) and, more recently, through his work advising on the discovery and development of avapritinib (Ayvakit) for PDGFRA-mutant GIST. By advising Merck KGaA scientists for more than a decade in the U.S. and Germany, Demetri helped discover the anticancer agent M4205. This molecule was licensed to IDRX, a biotechnology firm co-founded by Demetri and colleagues, where it was developed in clinical trials as IDRX-42. Based on initial promising data, IDRX was acquired by GSK in 2025, and IDRX-42 (now known as velzatinib) continues in two large Phase 3 clinical trials for GIST.

Influence on policy and education

Demetri has been actively involved in continuing medical education and in shaping national clinical practice guidelines for sarcoma. He served as the founding chair of the Sarcoma Clinical Practice Guidelines Committee for the National Comprehensive Cancer Network (NCCN). He is also a founding co-chair of the medical advisory board for the Sarcoma Foundation of America. In addition, he developed a specialized workshop with the American Association for Cancer Research (AACR) entitled Translational Cancer Research for Basic Scientists, which continues to be held annually in Boston under his chairmanship.

Awards and honors

Demetri's impact on precision cancer medicine and clinical oncology has led to many honors. He received the Emil J. Freireich Award in Clinical Cancer Research from MD Anderson Cancer Center in 2002. In 2009, he was awarded the Alexander Bodini Foundation Prize from the American Italian Cancer Foundation. And in 2020, he received the David A. Karnofsky Memorial Award from the American Society of Clinical Oncology.

In 2023, Demetri was awarded the J.E. Wallace Sterling Lifetime Achievement Award in Medicine from the Stanford Medicine Alumni Association, recognizing his career as a physician-scientist dedicated to developing precision cancer therapies.

He is an elected member of the Association of American Physicians (2016) and a Fellow of the Academy of the American Association for Cancer Research (FAACR). He is also a Fellow of the American Society of Clinical Oncology (FASCO) and has been named a "Best Doctor" in Boston Magazine multiple times.

He has authored or co-authored over 400 peer-reviewed publications.
