= Michael Karin =

- מיכאל קרין
- Born: 1951 (age 74–75)
- Education: Tel Aviv University; University of California, Los Angeles
- Awards: William B. Coley Award; Elected Fellow of the AACR Academy
- Scientific career
- Fields: Pharmacology
- Workplaces: University of California, San Diego; Sanford Burnham Prebys

Michael Karin (Hebrew: מיכאל קרין; born 1951, Tel Aviv, Israel) is an Israeli-American molecular biologist and pharmacologist. He is Director of the Center for Metabolic and Liver Diseases at Sanford Burnham Prebys. He was previously Distinguished Professor of Pharmacology and Pathology, Ben and Wanda Hildyard Chair for Mitochondrial and Metabolic Diseases, and American Cancer Society Research Professor at the University of California, San Diego, where he served from 1986 until his retirement.

== Early life and education ==
Karin was born in Tel Aviv, Israel in 1951. He went to high school with fellow NAS member Adi Shamir. He graduated magna cum laude in 1975 from Tel Aviv University in biology. He received his Ph.D. in molecular biology from University of California, Los Angeles in 1979, where he studied the genetic regulation of metallothioneins. He then completed postdoctoral fellowships with Beatrice Mintz at the Fox Chase Cancer Center, and subsequently with John Baxter at the University of California, San Francisco.

== Career ==
In 1982, Karin was hired as Assistant Professor of Microbiology at the University of Southern California. In 1986, he moved to the University of California, San Diego. At UCSD Karin has continued his studies of metallothionein gene regulation, mapping promoter elements that mediate gene induction by heavy metals, phorbol ester tumor promoters and glucocorticoid hormone. This work led to the identification of AP-1 transcription factors, later found to be composed of Jun and Fos prototo- oncoproteins. Studying how phosphorylation of c Jun controls its transcriptional activity the Karin lab discovered the Jun N terminal kinase (JNK) subgroup of MAP kinases and moleculary cloned them in collaboration with Roger Davis. Following their charting of the JNK signaling pathway, Karin and coworkers have begun to study the role of protein phosphorylation in control of NF-κB activity. That work has led to identification and molecular cloning of the IκB kinase (IKK) complex, which has turned out to be one of the major activators of the inflammatory response and innate immunity. Having found that IKK dependent NF-κB activation suppresses programmed cell death, Karin and colleagues postulated that NF-κB provided the long suspected mechanistic link between inflammation and cancer. Within two years of making this proposal they obtained strong experimental evidence that NF-κB activation does provide a major mechanism through which inflammation and infection promote cancer development, especially in the gastrointestinal track. The Karin lab was also the first to show how hepatic steatosis stimulates development of hepatocellular carcinoma (HCC), the major liver cancer form. They also developed a highly efficient and robust model for studying how HCC development is promoted by the common metabolic disorder non-alcoholic steatohepatitis (NASH). Using the so-called MUP-uPA mouse they demonstrated that NASH development depends on ER stress and TNF-mediated inflammation. NASH to HCC progression depends on suppression of CD8 T cell-mediated immunosurveillance, caused by accumulation of immunosuppressive IgA producing plasma cells. These pathogenic mechanisms were shown to be clinically relevant, thus providing an explanation to the surprising efficacy of PD-1 checkpoint inhibitory drugs in human non-viral HCC.

== Awards ==
- 2005 – Elected Member of the National Academy of Sciences, Washington, DC
- 2007 – Elected Foreign Associate of the European Molecular Biology Organization
- 2011 – Elected Member of the Institute of Medicine
- 2011 – Harvey Prize in Human Health
- 2013 – William B. Coley Award for Distinguished Research in Basic and Tumor Immunology, Cancer Research Institute
- 2013 – Charles Rodolphe Brupbacher Prize
- 2017 – Elected Fellow of the AACR Academy
- 2020 – AACR G.H.A. Clowes Award for Outstanding Basic Cancer Research
