= Harvey Prize =

Israeli science and technology award

- Awarded for: Science, Technology, Human Health, and Contributions to Peace in the Middle East
- Country: Israel
- Presented by: Technion – Israel Institute of Technology
- Website: https://harveypz.net.technion.ac.il/

The Harvey Prize is an annual Israeli award for breakthroughs in science and technology, as well as contributions to peace in the Middle East granted by the Technion in Haifa. The prize has become a "Nobel predictor" over the years, as around 30% of its recipients have become Nobel Prize winners. It is the most prestigious award bestowed upon by the Technion.

== History ==
The prize is named for industrialist and inventor Leo Harvey. Two prizes of $75,000 each are awarded each year. Candidates are submitted by past recipients, Technion Senate members and presidents of recognized institutions of higher learning and research in Israel and abroad. Generally, recipients of the Nobel or Wolf Prizes are not eligible for the Harvey Prize, unless the accomplishments cited in the nomination represent new or different work. However, some scientists who won the Harvey Prize were later presented with the Nobel Prize, e.g. Eric Kandel, Shuji Nakamura and Katalin Karikó.

== List of recipients ==
Harvey Prize laureates
Year	Laureat	Country	Reference or notes
1972	William J. Kolff	U.S.	Invention of the artificial kidney.
1972	Claude E. Shannon	U.S.	Mathematical theory of communication known as the Science of Information Theory.
1974	Alan Howard Cottrell	U.K.	Comprehensive theories concerning the mechanical properties of materials.
1974	Gershom Scholem	Israel	Literature of profound insight into the life and mores of the peoples of the Middle East.
1975	George Klein	Sweden	Discoveries in cancer immunology.
1975	Edward Teller	U.S.	Discoveries in atomic, nuclear and solid state physics and their practical application for the production of energy.
1976	Saul Lieberman	U.S.	For investigations into the civilizations of the peoples of the Middle East in the Hellenistic and Roman periods, and for his great and profound commentaries on the sources of Talmudic literature.
1976	Herman F. Mark	U.S.	Pioneering research and educational efforts in the field of polymers and plastics.
1977	Seymour Benzer	U.S.	Discoveries in molecular genetics and his influence to modern biologists.
1977	Freeman John Dyson	U.K./U.S.	Work in the fields of quantum electrodynamics, ferromagnetism, field theory, statistical mechanics and the stability of matter.
1978	Bernard Lewis	U.K./U.S.	Profound insight into the life and mores of the peoples of the Middle East through his writings.
1978	Isaac Wahl	Israel	Research and techniques in the improvement of cereal grains, which have inspired scientists seeking to provide adequate food supplies for an ever-growing world population.
1979	Ephraim Racker	U.S.	Fundamental contributions to the understanding of the complex process by which living beings harness energy, and the application of this knowledge to the correction of metabolic aberrations found in the diseased cell.
1980	Shlomo Dov Goitein	U.S. / Israel	Work on the everyday life, culture, society and economy of Jews and non-Jews in Moslem countries in the Middle Ages, and his numerous contributions in the field of Jewish and Arab history.
1980	Michael O. Rabin	Israel	Outstanding contributions to computer theory.
1981	Hans W. Kosterlitz	U.K.	Work on the discovery, identification and pharmacology of naturally occurring encephalins and opiates in the brain, which has exerted an all-embracing influence on neuroscientists working on the biochemistry and pharmacology of the brain.
1981	James M. Lighthill	U.K.	Pioneering research in fluid mechanics and his leadership in the application of mathematics to the engineering and biological sciences.
1982	Jakob Polotsky	Israel	Contribution to the study of the languages of the Middle East leading to deeper insight into the cultural mores of its peoples.
1982	Alvin M. Weinberg	U.S.	Contribution to the field of nuclear physics and to the development of nuclear energy technology for peaceful purposes.
1983	Robert Aumann	Israel	His central role in the development of mathematical economics and game theory. His major contributions have been to the problems of markets with many traders; by idealizing to a "continuum" of participants he was able to exploit the sophisticated tools of mathematics of continua.
1983	Philip Leder	U.S.	Contribution to the field of molecular genetics through the development of novel methods of analysis of gene structure and function.
1984	Franz Rosenthal	U.S.	Contribution to the deeper understanding of two important aspects of Semitic culture, namely the Aramaic language and Arabic literature; of his work on Aramaic and its offshoots to the organization of a comprehensive handbook of Aramaic dialects.
1984	Peter P. Sorokin	U.S.	Contributions to the development of lasers and quantum electronics. His major contributions have been the invention of the dye laser and the tunable laser sources.
1985	George Bernard Dantzig	U.S.	Contribution to engineering and the sciences through his pioneering work in mathematical programming and his development of the simplex method. His work permits the solution of many previously intractable problems and has made linear programming into one of the most frequently used techniques of modern applied mathematics.
1985	Barnett Rosenberg	U.S.	Contribution to medical research through his pioneering discovery of the value of platinum-based compounds, notably cis-platin, in treatment of testicular, ovarian and other cancers, and his persistence in proving their effectiveness.
1986	Paul C. Lauterbur	U.S.	Contribution to science and technology through his development of nuclear magnetic resonance techniques for generating images of the tissues of living organisms, an advance with many promising applications in medicine.
1986	Benjamin Mazar	Israel	Work and achievements in the field of archaeology, geography and history of Eretz Israel and the people of Israel – and his outstanding contribution to the investigation of the cultures of the Middle East and coordination of results with the Scriptures of the Bible.
1987	Pierre Chambon	France	Contributions to the understanding of gene structure and regulation, the characterization of mammalian enhancer sequences and the analysis of steroid hormone binding sites.
1987	Sydney Brenner	U.K.	Contributions to molecular biology, in particular the invention of negative staining electron microscopy, his work on bacterial genetics and the solution of the genetic code, and his foundation of the field of nematode molecular genetics.
1988	Pierre-Gilles de Gennes	France	Contributions to condensed matter physics through his work in the fields of superconductivity, liquid crystals, polymer physics and colloid and interface science.
1989	Benoit Mandelbrot	France / U.S.	Contribution to the development of the theory of fractals which has had a great impact on a variety of fields including physics, astronomy geography, chemistry, information theory, economics and applied mathematics.
1990	Robert H. Dennard	U.S.	Invention of the one-transistor dynamic memory cell which is the basis for the one-device DRAM (dynamic random access memory) memory chip used worldwide in computers and for his contribution to the scaling theory which has been widely used in the miniaturization of MOSFET (metal oxide semiconductor field-effect transistor) integrated circuits.
1991	Jacques-Louis Lions	France	Creating modern control theory in all its aspects and its application to physics and engineering, of his pioneering work in applying methods of functional analysis in the theory of linear as well as non-linear partial differential equations and numerical analysis and of his many contributions to applied mathematics.
1991	Bert Sakmann	Germany	Breakthrough achievements in developing the patch clamp technique which revolutionized modern electrophysiology by enabling studies of single ion channels.
1992	Mikhail Sergievich Gorbachev	U.S.S.R.	In appreciation of his seminal initiatives which had a profound impact on international relations and improved the quality of life of hundreds of millions of people.
1992	Amnon Yariv	U.S.	Pioneering contributions to opto-electronics, wave propagation in crystals and nonlinear and phase conjugate optics, and his demonstration of semiconductor-based integrated optics technology leading to the development of high-speed and stable solid state lasers.
1993	Hillel Furstenberg	Israel	Ground-breaking work in ergodic theory and probability, Lie groups and topological dynamics.
1993	Eric Kandel	U.S.	Fundamental contribution to the explication of the cellular and molecular basis of learning and memory.
1993	Richard Zare	U.S.	Contributions to the understanding of chemical reactions at the molecular level, which have transformed modern chemistry. He showed how laser spectroscopies can be used to study chemical processes, and has applied his methods also to the solution of open problems in chemical analysis.
1994	Vladimir I. Arnold	Russia	Basic contribution to the stability theory of Dynamical Systems, his pioneering work on singularity theory and seminal contributions to analysis and geometry.
1994	Robert A. Weinberg	U.S.	Research on the molecular biology of cancer. His major contributions have been the isolation of the first oncogene from human cancer and of a tumor suppressor gene whose loss of function promotes retinoblastoma.
1995	John W. Cahn	U.S.	Pioneering work on the theory of phase separation – spinodal decomposition, his basic contribution to wetting and wetting transition and fundamental studies of interfaces and quasi-periodic crystals.
1995	Donald E. Knuth	U.S.	Contributions to theory of computation, software, programming languages, mathematics and typesetting, his pioneering work on analysis of algorithms and attribute grammars, and his development of TEX and METAFONT.
1996	C. Walton Lillehei	U.S.	Pioneering role in the introduction, innovation and development of open heart surgery and his seminal contributions to the invention of the heart-lung machine and the pacemaker.
1996	Claude Cohen-Tannoudji	France	Contributions to modern quantum optics, in particular, development of new optical detection methods, laser spectroscopy, optical pumping, and laser trapping and cooling of atoms, leading to the lowest temperatures attained by man.
1997	Roger D. Kornberg	U.S.	Research on the structure and expression of genes in eukaryotic organisms. His major contributions include the discovery of the structure of the nucleosome, the basic repeating unit of chromatin.
1998	Richard Karp	U.S.	Achievements in the areas of theoretical computer science and operations research, in particular for his fundamental contributions to the development of numerous combinatorical algorithms.
1998	K. Barry Sharpless	U.S.	Research in organic chemistry, in particular, for his pioneering contributions in the field of catalytic asymmetric synthesis, which has had major impact on organic synthesis.
1999	Elizabeth H. Blackburn	U.S.	Pioneering discoveries and leadership in the rapidly evolving field of research on telomers, the ends of chromosomes.
1999	Robert G. Gallager	U.S.	Pioneering work and fundamental contributions to Information and Coding Theories and for his profound insight into the Theory of Computer Networking.
2000	David J. Gross	U.S.	Contributions to all aspects of elementary particle physics and in particular for the discovery of the "Asymptotic Freedom" property of the strong interactions among the most elementary constituents of matter.
2000	Harry B. Gray	U.S.	Pioneering contributions to inorganic and bioinorganic chemistry. In particular for his studies of reaction mechanisms and the nature of the chemical bond in transition metal complexes and of the long-range electron transfer in proteins.
2001	Bert Vogelstein	U.S.	Research that resulted in the establishment of a detailed genetic model, which links the formation and progression of colorectal cancer with sequential mutations in specific proto-oncogenes and tumor suppressor genes.
2001	James E. Peebles	U.S.	Work on cosmic microwave background radiation and setting the physical basis for the hot big bang theory. For his seminal contributions to the understanding of the origin of our universe, the creation of the lightest elements, and the formation of galaxies and clustering.
2002	Ada E. Yonath	Israel	Pioneering crystallographic studies on the ribosome. In particular, for her discoveries in structural biology that have shed light on the makeup and function of the ribosome, the protein synthetic machinery of living cells. These discoveries have led to the rational design of new antibiotic drugs.
2002	Peter B. Dervan	U.S.	Pioneering studies that have laid down the foundations for gene regulation by small molecules. In particular, for combining the art of organic synthesis, physical chemistry and biology to create novel synthetic molecules, with high affinity and sequence specificity, comparable to Nature's proteins for any predetermined sequence of the genetic material, DNA.
2003	Robert S. Langer	U.S.	Pioneering research in biomedical engineering, biomaterials, tissue engineering and biotechnology and his outstanding achievements in these areas.
2004	Arthur Ashkin	U.S.	Pioneering theoretical and experimental research on manipulation of particles by laser light forces, including the invention of "optical tweezers", which revolutionized atomic and biological physics, and for his basic contributions to nonlinear optics.
2004	Wayne A. Hendrickson	U.S.	Seminal scientific and technological accomplishments that have revolutionized the field of structural biology.
2005	Edward Witten	U.S.	Work on Superstring Theory, which has created a revolution in theoretical Physics and Mathematics and has attracted many of the brightest scientists in the world.
2005	Wolfgang Baumeister	Germany	Discovery of new macromolecular complexes essential for protein folding and degradation and for his contributions to understanding chaperonins and proteasomes.
2006	Charles L. Bennett	U.S.	Contributing to knowledge of cosmology through pioneering measurements of the Cosmic Microwave Background using NASA's Cosmic Background Explorer satellite and Wilkinson Microwave Anisotropy Probe, which led to the precise determination of the age, composition and curvature of the universe.
2006	Ronald M. Evans	U.S.	Discovery of a super-family of genes encoding nuclear hormone receptors and the elucidation of their universal ability to affect gene expression and thereby virtually every developmental and metabolic pathway.
2007	Michael Graetzel	Switzerland	Pioneered research on energy and electron transfer reactions in mesoscopic-materials and their optoelectronic applications. His discovery achieved for the first time the separation of solar light harvesting and charge carrier transport in a photovoltaic conversion process.
2007	Stephen E. Harris	U.S.	Pioneering experimental and theoretical contributions to basic research in numerous areas of quantum electronics, laser physics, nonlinear optics, and generation of extreme-ultraviolet laser light.
2008	Charles H. Bennett	U.S.	Seminal role in founding and advancing the field of Quantum Information and Quantum Computation, inventing entirely new ways of understanding fundamental quantum phenomena and thus connecting physics to branches of information and computational complexity.
2008	David Eisenberg	U.S.	Contribution, pushing the technical limits of crystallography, elucidating the structure of amyloid fibrils. Given the involvement of amyloid plaques in numerous diseases, including neurodegenerative disorders, understanding their structure has become a central goal of structural biology allied to medicine.
2009	David C. Baulcombe	U.K.	in recognition of his seminal role in discovering the key function of short RNA molecules in regulating gene expression.
2009	Shuji Nakamura	U.S.	in recognition of his seminal contributions to light sources based on nitride containing III-V semiconductors.
2010	Michael Karin	U.S.	for his pioneering contribution that led to deciphering the molecular mechanism through which mammalian cells react to cytokines which cause inflammation, to adverse environmental conditions and also to various pathogens.
2010	Alexander M. Polyakov	Russia / U.S.	for developing revolutionary theories that shaped our contemporary understanding of elementary particles in nature.
2011	Richard H. Friend	U.K.	in recognition of his outstanding contributions to science and technology, which are already making an impact on the semi-conductor industry and our lives.
2011	Judea Pearl	U.S.	in recognition of his foundational work that has touched a multitude of spheres of modern life.
2012	Eric Lander	U.S.	for contributions to human health.
2012	Eli Yablonovitch	U.S.	for pioneering discoveries in photonics, optoelectronics, and semiconductors that impacted our lives.
2013	Jon M. Kleinberg	U.S.	for his seminal contributions and leadership in the newly emerging science of information networks, including his groundbreaking work on characterizing the structure of the World Wide Web in terms of hubs and authorities, his analysis of the " small-world" phenomena, and his work on influence propagation in networks.
2013	Paul B. Corkum	Canada	for his remarkable contributions in the field of ultrafast laser spectroscopy, to the field of high harmonic generation and for his ability to create intuitive models for very complex phenomena which enabled him to make the advances that created the exciting field of attosecond spectroscopy.
2014	James P. Allison	U.S.	in recognition of his fundamental contributions to immunology and of his advancement of new immunotherapeutic agents against cancer. His achievements include the identification of the T-cell receptor and its co-stimulatory molecule CD28 and the discovery of a critical T-cell inhibitor CTLA-4.
2014	Reinhard Genzel	Germany	in recognition of developing many novel ground, airborne and space-based instruments enabling the tracking of the motion of stars with unprecedented precision extremely close to the Galactic center and thus, to be the first to provide irrefutable evidence for the existence of massive black hole at the Galactic center.
2015	Marc Kirschner	U.S.	for his groundbreaking and pioneering discoveries and contributions to three fundamental areas of modern biology: embryology, cell organization and the cell cycle.
2015	Immanuel Bloch	Germany	for fundamental contributions in the field of light and matter interactions in quantum many-body systems. In particular, he is recognized for his pioneering experiments realizing quantum simulators using cold atoms trapped in crystals of light, thereby establishing a new research field at the interface of condensed matter, atomic physics, and quantum optics.
2016	Karl Deisseroth	U.S.	for their discovery of opsin molecules, involved in sensing light in microorganisms, and their pioneering work in utilizing these opsins to develop "optogenetics".
2016	Peter Hegemann	Germany	for their discovery of opsin molecules, involved in sensing light in microorganisms, and their pioneering work in utilizing these opsins to develop "optogenetics".
2016	Ronald Drever	U.K.	for the first direct detection of gravitational waves, confirming a central prediction of Einstein's General Relativity and opening a new window to the Universe. Also for identifying the source as a merger of two giant black holes, and for the unprecedented technological achievement represented by this laser interferometer experiment.
2016	Kip S. Thorne	U.S.	for the first direct detection of gravitational waves, confirming a central prediction of Einstein's General Relativity and opening a new window to the Universe. Also for identifying the source as a merger of two giant black holes, and for the unprecedented technological achievement represented by this laser interferometer experiment.
2016	Rainer Weiss	U.S.	for the first direct detection of gravitational waves, confirming a central prediction of Einstein's General Relativity and opening a new window to the Universe. Also for identifying the source as a merger of two giant black holes, and for the unprecedented technological achievement represented by this laser interferometer experiment.
2017	Tobin Marks	U.S.	for breakthroughs in chemistry.
2017	Carla Shatz	U.S.	for her discoveries in the development of neural circuits in the visual system.
2018	Emmanuelle Charpentier	France	for leading the development of CRISPR-Cas9 technology, a breakthrough in genetic modification.
2018	Jennifer Doudna	U.S.	for leading the development of CRISPR-Cas9 technology, a breakthrough in genetic modification.
2018	Feng Zhang	U.S.	for leading the development of CRISPR-Cas9 technology, a breakthrough in genetic modification.
2018	Christos H. Papadimitriou	Greece	for his contribution to computer science.
2019	Joseph DeSimone	U.S.	for his contributions to materials science, chemistry, polymer science and technology, nano medicine, and 3D printing.
2019	Raphael Mechoulam	Israel	for his ground-breaking research elucidating the components, mechanisms of action, and implications for human health of the cannabinoid system.
2020	James R. Rice	U.S.	for his fundamental and long-standing contributions to the fields of mechanics of materials and geophysics, particularly for the development of the J-integral and for his leadership, which has broadened the understanding of friction and earthquakes.
2021	Helen Quinn	U.S.	for her seminal contributions in theoretical physics. Her two major contributions– the Peccei-Quinn symmetry and the Georgi-Quinn-Weinberg calculation of "running" coupling constants– have been two of the most significant and influential ideas about physics beyond the Standard Model of particle physics.
2021	Katalin Karikó	Hungary	for engineering modified RNA technology and packaging which enabled rapid development and delivery of effective COVID-19 vaccines.
2021	Drew Weissman	U.S.	for engineering modified RNA technology and packaging which enabled rapid development and delivery of effective COVID-19 vaccines.
2021	Pieter Cullis	Canada	for engineering modified RNA technology and packaging which enabled rapid development and delivery of effective COVID-19 vaccines.
2022	Stephen B. Baylin	U.S.	for seminal contributions to discovering the role of epigenetics in cell differentiation and processes in normal function and cancer.
2022	Andrew P. Feinberg	U.S.	for seminal contributions to discovering the role of epigenetics in cell differentiation and processes in normal function and cancer.
2022	Peter A. Jones	South Africa	for seminal contributions to discovering the role of epigenetics in cell differentiation and processes in normal function and cancer.
2025	David R. Liu	U.S.	in recognition of his pioneering work developing base editing and prime editing, two genome editing techniques now used to treat genetic diseases in human patients.
2025	Chad A. Mirkin	U.S.	for his pioneering research that has reshaped nanoscience, nanotechnology, and nanomedicine.

== See also ==
- List of general science and technology awards
