= Daniel Von Hoff =

American oncologist

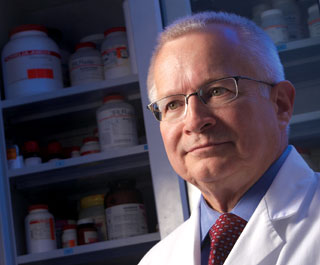
Daniel D. Von Hoff

Daniel D. Von Hoff is the physician in chief and director of translational research at Translational Genomics Research Institute (TGen), and current Virginia G. Piper Distinguished Chair for Innovative Cancer Research at HonorHealth Clinical Research Institute. He is also a professor of medicine at the Mayo Clinic and medical director of research as well as chief scientific officer at US Oncology. He is most notable for his work in targeted therapies for the treatment of cancer. He led the development of gemcitabine, and has several drugs in development.

== Education ==
Von Hoff received his bachelor's degree from Carroll College, and his MD from Columbia University College of Physicians and Surgeons in 1973. He did a residency in internal medicine at UC San Francisco, followed by a fellowship in oncology at the National Cancer Institute.

== Career ==
After his fellowship, Von Hoff joined the faculty at University of Texas Health Science Center, San Antonio (UTHSCSA) as a professor of medicine and cellular and structural biology. In 1989, he became the founding director of UTHSCSA's Institute for Drug Development at the Cancer Therapy and Research Center. He later became the director of the cancer center and professor of medicine at the University of Arizona. Dr. Von Hoff has served on the Medical Advisory Board of the Seena Magowitz Foundation since 2014.

Von Hoff has been part of more than 200 clinical trials. Some of the drugs he has been involved in the development of include mitoxantrone, fludarabine, paclitaxel, docetaxel, gemcitabine, irinotecan, nelarabine, capecitabine, and vismodegib.

== Awards ==
- 1980 Elected Fellow, American College of Physicians
- 1992 Elected Fellow, American Association for the Advancement of Science
- 1997 AACR–Richard and Hinda Rosenthal Award
- 1999 President, American Association for Cancer Research
- 2003 Weinberg Award, Dana Farber Cancer Institute
- 2004–2010 Member of the National Cancer Advisory Board
- 2009 Stand Up to Cancer Dream Team Grant Award – Pancreatic Cancer
- 2010 David A. Karnofsky Memorial Award, American Society of Clinical Oncology
- 2013 Elected fellow of the AACR Academy
- 2014 Award of Excellence, Hope Funds for Cancer Research
