= IDRX-42 =

Possible gastrointestinal tumour drug

Clinical data
- Other names: M4205; M-4205

Legal status
- Legal status: Investigational

Identifiers
- IUPAC name: N-[[4-(1-Methylpyrazol-4-yl)phenyl]methyl]-6-[7-(3-pyrrolidin-1-ylpropoxy)imidazo[1,2-a]pyridin-3-yl]pyrimidin-4-amine
- CAS Number: 2590556-80-0
- PubChem CID: 155587867
- DrugBank: DB18087
- ChemSpider: 114916636
- UNII: Y6UHU32G5Z
- ChEMBL: ChEMBL5314917

Chemical and physical data
- Formula: C_{29}H_{32}N_{8}O
- Molar mass: 508.630 g·mol^{−1}
- 3D model (JSmol): Interactive image
- SMILES: CN1C=C(C=N1)C2=CC=C(C=C2)CNC3=NC=NC(=C3)C4=CN=C5N4C=CC(=C5)OCCCN6CCCC6
- InChI: InChI=1S/C29H32N8O/c1-35-20-24(18-34-35)23-7-5-22(6-8-23)17-30-28-16-26(32-21-33-28)27-19-31-29-15-25(9-13-37(27)29)38-14-4-12-36-10-2-3-11-36/h5-9,13,15-16,18-21H,2-4,10-12,14,17H2,1H3,(H,30,32,33); Key:LVMAULGVWBINFP-UHFFFAOYSA-N

IDRX-42 (formerly M4205) is a highly selective small molecule KIT inhibitor compound developed for the treatment of gastrointestinal stromal tumors. The compound was originally discovered by the German company Merck and later out-licensed to IDRX. In November 2024, promising anti-tumor data from ongoing Phase 1/1B studies were reported. In January 2025, the compound played a key role in the $1 billion acquisition of IDRX by GSK.
