= Duke Cancer Institute =

Geography
- Location: Durham, North Carolina, United States
- Coordinates: 36.003767°N 78.938812°W

Organization
- Type: Specialist
- Affiliated university: Duke University

Services
- Speciality: Oncology

History
- Opened: 1971

Links
- Website: dukecancerinstitute.org
- Lists: Hospitals in North Carolina

The Duke Cancer Institute (DCI) is a National Cancer Institute-designated Comprehensive Cancer Center, research facility, and hospital. Founded in 1971, the center is part of the Duke University School of Medicine and Duke University Health System located in Durham, North Carolina, United States.

The center specializes in the treatment and prevention of cancer and was ranked 41st in the U.S. News & World Report's 2021 list of top cancer hospitals. More than 10,000 new cancer patients are seen at Duke each year. The institute signed the National Cancer Act of 1971 and became an NCI-designated cancer center in 1973.

In November 2010, Victor Dzau, MD, chancellor of health affairs for Duke University, formally unveiled the Duke Cancer Institute, during the topping out ceremony for the new building.

The DCI is a single entity—the first of its kind at Duke—that integrates and aligns patient care and basic and clinical research with the goals of improving patient outcomes, decreasing the burden of cancer and accelerating scientific progress.

Michael B. Kastan, a cancer scientist and Director of the Comprehensive Cancer Center at St. Jude Children’s Research Hospital, was named as the first Executive Director of the Duke Cancer Institute in May 2011. Eun-Sil Shelley Hwang became the institute's first female Chief of Breast Surgery.

On February 27, 2012, the Duke Cancer Institute opened the Duke Cancer Center, a new seven-floor building devoted exclusively to cancer care.

== Clinical milestones ==
In June 2018, the institute published a study in The New England Journal of Medicine showing how a genetically modified poliovirus therapy improved long-term survival for patients with recurrent glioblastoma. Patients showed a three-year survival rate of 21 percent.
