= Susan Hilsenbeck =

American biostatistician

Susan Galloway Hilsenbeck is an American biostatistician whose research interests include biomarkers and the applications of biostatistics in cancer research. She is a professor in the Baylor College of Medicine, where she directs the Quantitative Sciences Share Resource in the Dan L. Duncan Comprehensive Cancer Center.

Hilsenbeck earned her Ph.D. in 1990, at the University of Miami. Her dissertation, Acquisition and use of information on data quality in large population-based tumor registries, was supervised by Charles Kurucz. She was elected as a Fellow of the American Statistical Association in 2011.

Her hobbies include scuba diving and quilting. Her quilts have been featured in the books Amish Quilts, The Adventure Continues (2013) and Quarantine Quilts: Creativity in the Midst of Chaos (2021).
