= P73 =

Protein found in humans

TP73
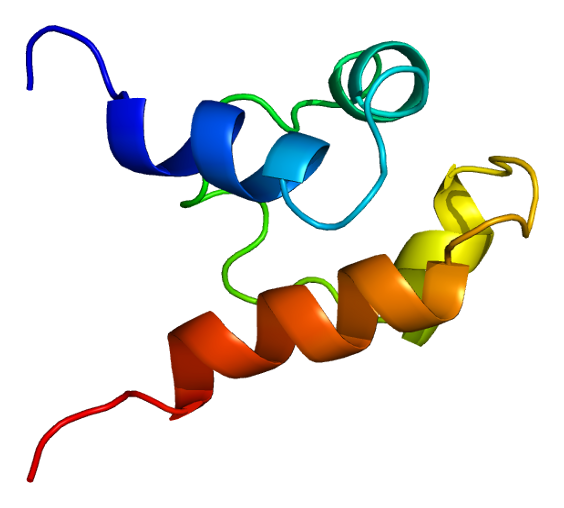

Identifiers
- Aliases: TP73, P73, tumor protein p73, CILD47
- External IDs: OMIM: 601990; MGI: 1336991; GeneCards: TP73
Available structures
PDB	Ortholog search: PDBe RCSB
PDB	List of PDB id codes 4GUQ, 1COK, 1DXS, 2KBY, 2MPS, 2WQI, 2WQJ, 2WTT, 2XWC, 3VD0, 3VD1, 3VD2, 4A63, 4G82, 4G83, 4GUO

Gene location (Human)
Chr.	Chromosome 1 (human)
Band	1p36.32	Start	3,652,516 bp
Band	1p36.32	End	3,736,201 bp

Gene location (Mouse)
Chr.	Chromosome 4 (mouse)
Band	4 E2|4 83.79 cM	Start	154,140,706 bp
Band	4 E2|4 83.79 cM	End	154,224,665 bp
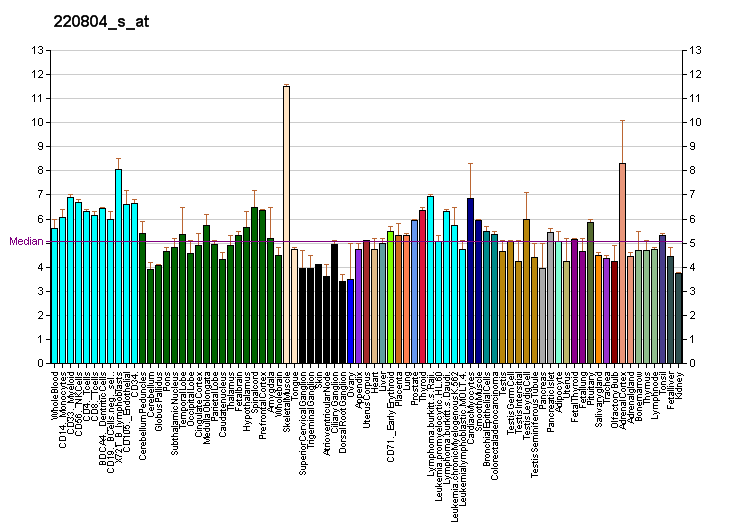
RNA expression pattern
Bgee	Human / Mouse (ortholog); Top expressed in: right uterine tube; olfactory zone of nasal mucosa; bronchial epithelial cell; cerebellar hemisphere; right hemisphere of cerebellum; skin of leg; skin of abdomen; mucosa of esophagus; minor salivary glands; bone marrow cell / Top expressed in: choroidal fissure; choroid plexus of fourth ventricle; zygote; lip; secondary oocyte; Jacobson's organ; mandibular molars; Epithelium of choroid plexus; embryo; primary oocyte; More reference expression data
BioGPS	More reference expression data
Gene ontology
Molecular function	DNA binding; sequence-specific DNA binding; DNA-binding transcription activator activity, RNA polymerase II-specific; transcription factor binding; chromatin binding; metal ion binding; RNA polymerase II cis-regulatory region sequence-specific DNA binding; damaged DNA binding; protein binding; identical protein binding; protein kinase binding; p53 binding; DNA-binding transcription factor activity; MDM2/MDM4 family protein binding; DNA-binding transcription factor activity, RNA polymerase II-specific
Cellular component	cytoplasm; Golgi apparatus; intracellular membrane-bounded organelle; transcription regulator complex; cell junction; chromatin; nucleus; mitochondrion; nucleoplasm; cytosol
Biological process	negative regulation of neuron apoptotic process; positive regulation of oligodendrocyte differentiation; intrinsic apoptotic signaling pathway in response to DNA damage by p53 class mediator; regulation of transcription, DNA-templated; negative regulation of neuron differentiation; kidney development; cellular response to UV; negative regulation of transcription by RNA polymerase II; protein tetramerization; transcription, DNA-templated; cellular response to DNA damage stimulus; mitotic G1 DNA damage checkpoint signaling; response to organonitrogen compound; intrinsic apoptotic signaling pathway in response to DNA damage; regulation of mitotic cell cycle; positive regulation of apoptotic process; regulation of gene expression; DNA mismatch repair; cell cycle; negative regulation of cardiac muscle cell proliferation; viral process; negative regulation of JUN kinase activity; response to gamma radiation; response to X-ray; positive regulation of transcription by RNA polymerase II; DNA damage response, signal transduction by p53 class mediator resulting in transcription of p21 class mediator; negative regulation of cell population proliferation; apoptotic process; regulation of signal transduction by p53 class mediator; transcription by RNA polymerase II; regulation of apoptotic process; positive regulation of protein insertion into mitochondrial membrane involved in apoptotic signaling pathway; positive regulation of transcription, DNA-templated; regulation of hematopoietic stem cell differentiation
Sources:Amigo / QuickGO
Orthologs
Databases	NCBI: entry; OMA: entry
Species	Human	Mouse
Entrez	7161	22062
Ensembl	ENSG00000078900	ENSMUSG00000029026
UniProt	O15350	Q9JJP2
RefSeq (mRNA)	NM_001126240; NM_001126241; NM_001126242; NM_001204184; NM_001204185 NM_001204186; NM_001204187; NM_001204188; NM_001204189; NM_001204190; NM_001204191; NM_001204192; NM_005427	NM_001126330; NM_001126331; NM_011642
RefSeq (protein)	NP_001119712; NP_001119713; NP_001119714; NP_001191113; NP_001191114 NP_001191115; NP_001191116; NP_001191117; NP_001191118; NP_001191119; NP_001191120; NP_001191121; NP_005418	NP_001119802; NP_001119803; NP_035772
Location (UCSC)	Chr 1: 3.65 – 3.74 Mb	Chr 4: 154.14 – 154.22 Mb
PubMed search
- Wikidata
View/Edit Human	View/Edit Mouse

p73 is a protein related to the p53 tumor protein. Because of its structural resemblance to p53, it has also been considered a tumor suppressor. It is involved in cell cycle regulation, and induction of apoptosis. Like p53, p73 is characterized by the presence of different isoforms of the protein. This is explained by splice variants, and an alternative promoter in the DNA sequence.

p73, also known as tumor protein 73 (TP73), protein was the first identified homologue of the tumor suppressor gene, p53. Like p53, p73 has several variants. It is expressed as distinct forms differing at either at the C- or the N-terminus. Currently, six different C-terminus splicing variants have been found in normal cells. The p73 gene encodes a protein with a significant sequence homology and a functional similarity with the tumor suppressor p53. The over-expression of p73 in cultured cells promotes a growth arrest and/or apoptosis similarly to p53.

The p73 gene has been mapped to a chromosome region (1p36. 2–3) a locus commonly deleted in various tumor entities and human cancers. Similar to p53 the protein product of p73 induces cell cycle arrest or apoptosis, hence its classification as a tumor suppressor. However unlike its counterpart, p73 is infrequently mutated in cancers. Perhaps, even more shocking is the fact that p73 – deficient mice do not show a tumorigenic phenotype. A deficiency of p53 almost certainly leads to unchecked cell proliferation and is noted in 60% of cancers.

Analyses of many tumors typically found in humans including breast and ovarian cancer show a high expression of p73 when compared to normal tissues in corresponding areas. Adenoviruses that cause cellular transformations have also been found to result in increased p73 expression. Furthermore, recent finding are suggesting that over-expression of transcription factors involved in cell cycle regulation and synthesis of DNA in mammalian cells (e.g.: E2F-1) induces the expression of p73. Many researchers believe that these results imply that p73 may not be a tumor suppressor but rather an oncoprotein. Some suggest that the TP73 locus encodes both a tumor suppressor (TAp73) and a putative oncogene (ΔNp73). This is a strong theory and causes much confusion, as it is unknown which of the two p73 variants is over-expressed and ultimately plays a role in tumorigenesis.

Genes of the p53 family are known to be complex. The viral oncoproteins (e.g. Adenovirus E1B) that efficiently inhibit p53 function are unable to inactivate p73, and those that seem to inhibit p73 have no effect on p53.

Debate persists about the exact function of p73. Recently it has been reported that p73 is enriched in the nervous system and that the p73-deficient mice, which do not exhibit an increased susceptibility to spontaneous tumorigenesis, have neurological and immunological defects. These results have been expanded and it has also been shown that p73 is present in early stages of neurological development and neuronal apoptosis by blocking the proapoptotic function of p53. This strongly implicates p73 as playing a large role in cellular differentiation.
