= Cancer Prevention and Research Institute of Texas =

State agency in Texas, United States

- Abbreviation: CPRIT
- Formation: 2009
- Purpose: Promote and fund cancer research. Develop cancer research industry in Texas.
- Headquarters: 1701 North Congress Avenue, Suite 6-127; Austin, Texas 78701
- Region served: State of Texas
- Chief Executive Officer: Wayne Roberts
- Main organ: Oversight Committee of nine appointed commissioners
- Website: www.cprit.texas.gov

The Cancer Prevention and Research Institute of Texas (CPRIT) is a state agency that funds cancer research in Texas. It is funded by bonds issued by the state of Texas. Researchers and organizations in Texas are invited to apply for grants that match CPRIT's mission and goals.

A financial statement prepared by CPRIT showed the organization planned to award over $250 million in cancer research grants and $28 million in cancer prevention grants in 2018. The organization has taken in revenue of just under $300 million per year from sale of bonds in recent years.

By law CPRIT was established to: "(1) create and expedite innovation in the area of cancer research and in enhancing the potential for a medical or scientific breakthrough in the prevention of cancer and cures for cancer;(2) attract, create, or expand research capabilities of public or private institutions of higher education and other public or private entities that will promote a substantial increase in cancer research and in the creation of high-quality new jobs in this state; and(3) develop and implement the Texas Cancer Plan." The organization's website says it is focused on "academic research, prevention and product development research."

CPRIT is the second largest public funder of cancer research in the United States besides NIH's National Cancer Institute.

== History ==
On May 25, 2007, the Texas House of Representatives passed HJR 90 to put a $3 billion bond proposal for the establishment of CPRIT on the November 2007 statewide ballot.

"Who hasn't been affected by this terrible disease, either personally or with a loved one?" asked Rep. Jim Keffer, R-Eastland, author of HJR 90, approved by 116 members of the House. "What a wonderful thing it would be to say we actually cured cancer and that Texas was in the middle of it."

"This initiative will help our colleges and universities establish Texas as a major medical research corridor and, most importantly, send a powerful message of hope to the cancer community: Help is on the way," said Senator Jane Nelson, R-Lewisville.

June 6, 2007, Governor Rick Perry signed HJR 90 into law, setting the stage for a November vote on Proposition 15 to establish CPRIT.

Starting in October 2007, Lance Armstrong led a statewide bus tour to galvanize voters to support Proposition 15. "With the kind of shot in the arm this extra money will give us here in Texas, we're going to make discoveries and we're going to have new treatments," said Armstrong.

In November 2007 voters approved Proposition 15 to amend the state constitution and create funding for CPRIT. The proposition approved up to $3 billion in bonds to fund the agency. Lance Armstrong and the Texas-based Susan G. Komen foundation publicly supported the proposition.

In early 2009 the 80th Texas Legislature passed House Bill 14 which created CPRIT and merged it with the old Texas Cancer Council. William "Bill" Gimson was named the first executive director. Nobel laureate Alfred G. Gilman was named Chief Scientific Officer.

Within a few years the agency was afflicted with allegations of wrongdoing in the awarding of grant money. Observers protested that agency personnel did not follow appropriate scientific review. Law enforcement authorities began to investigate whether CPRIT officials broke the law in their distribution of grant funds. A press investigation alleged CPRIT made a $11 million grant to Peloton Therapeutics in 2010 without review. A $20 million grant the M.D Anderson Institute for Applied Cancer Science also drew attention and criticism.

By 2012 the agency was being investigated by the Travis County district Attorney, the state Attorney General's office, and was being reviewed by the state auditor's office, which is overseen by the Legislature.

The Associated Press reported "at least seven scientists" had resigned in protest in October 2012. Alfred G. Gilman and fellow Nobel Laureate Phillip Sharp were among those who left.

Gimson resigned as executive director in December 2012. He was replaced on an interim basis by Wayne Roberts, who was appointed permanent CEO in December 2013.

In December 2012, CPRIT announced its new chief scientific officer was Margaret L. Kripke, a cancer immunologist who in 2007 retired as executive vice president and chief academic officer of the University of Texas MD Anderson Cancer Center in Houston.

A 2013 article in the Houston Chronicle stated CPRIT had made "misstep after misstep in awarding tens of millions of dollars to commercial interests."

In June 2013, Governor Perry signed Senate Bill 149 to clarify and strengthen conflict-of-interest and peer review procedures at CPRIT and implement all state auditor recommendations. In compliance with one of the Senate Bill 149 provisions, state leaders appointed new members to the CPRIT oversight committee in September 2013.

CPRIT announced on June 15, 2015, that it reached a new milestone: more than 2 million cancer prevention services had been provided to Texans in all 254 counties of the state.

In January 2016, CPRIT appointed James Willson as its new chief scientific officer. Previously, Dr. Willson was the director of the University of Texas Southwestern Medical Center's Harold C. Simmons Cancer Center.

In June 2017 Governor Abbott signed into law Senate Bill 81, extending CPRIT's Sunset Review date by two years from 2021 to 2023.

In July 2018, The Texas State Agency Business Administrators' Association (TSABAA) named CPRIT CEO Wayne Roberts its Administrator of the Year.

In October 2018, CPRIT grantee Jim Allison, Ph.D., chair of Immunology and executive director of the immunotherapy platform at The University of Texas MD Anderson Cancer Center, was awarded the 2018 Nobel Prize in Physiology or Medicine for launching an effective new way to attack cancer by treating the immune system rather than the tumor.

In October 2018, CPRIT grantee Livia S. Eberlin, assistant professor of chemistry at the University of Texas, was named as a MacArthur fellow, a prestigious award that includes a $625,000, no-strings-attached grant. She was recognized for leading a research team that developed a pen-sized device to detect cancer.

Also in October 2018, another CPRIT grantee, UT Southwestern biochemist Dr. Zhijian "James" Chen, won the 2019 Breakthrough Prize in Life Sciences for his discovery of the cGAS enzyme that launches the body's immune defense against infections and cancers.

In February 2019, CPRIT named Cindy WalkerPeach, Ph.D., as its Chief Product Development Officer. Dr. WalkerPeach previously served as Innovation-Corps (I-Corps) Program Director at the National Science Foundation (NSF) in Alexandria, Virginia.

== CPRIT Foundation ==
In 2009 the Texas legislature authorized the CPRIT Foundation, a privately funded charity to raise money in support of CPRIT. The non-profit foundation accepted donations and gave money to CPRIT executives in addition to the salaries they received as state employees. The foundation was criticized for lack of transparency by members of the Texas legislature.

In 2013 the foundation announced it was shutting down.

== Continuation ==
In May 2019, the Senate voted 31–0 to approve HJR 12 a month after the House voted 130–15 in favor of it. The measure called for a referendum to authorize another$3 billion in general bonds to fund CPRIT. Proposition 6 on the November 2019 statewide ballot in Texas would authorize an increase in the limit of state bonds issuance to fund CPRIT from $3 billion to $6 billion. A maximum of $300 million in bonds would be issued each year. On November 5, 2019, Texas voters approved Proposition 6 by a margin of 64% to 36%.
