= Frederick R. Appelbaum =

Frederick R. Appelbaum is an American physician and writer, who led the first clinical trial that demonstrated the use of autologous bone marrow transplantation.

He was appointed to the Board of Directors of the Andy Hill Cancer Research Endowment (CARE) Fund by Washington State Governor Jay Inslee in 2016 and served through March 2024.
