= Jinghui Zhang =

Chinese computational biologist

- Education: Fudan University; University of Connecticut
- Scientific career
- Fields: Computational biology
- Workplaces: St. Jude Children's Research Hospital

Jinghui Zhang is a computational biologist and osteosarcoma researcher. She is the Chair of Department of Computational Biology and Endowed Chair of Bioinformatics at the St. Jude Children's Research Hospital.

== Life ==
Zhang earned a B.S. from Fudan University in 1989. She completed a M.S. (1991) and Ph.D. (1994) from the University of Connecticut. Her dissertation was titled, Developing an Interactive Graphic Environment to Browse and Edit Integrated Genome Data. Claire M. Berg was her doctoral advisor.

Zhang is a computational biologist who researches large-scale genomic data and disease progression. She joined the St. Jude Children's Research Hospital in 2010. From 2015 to 2023, she was chair of the computational biology department. Zhang is the St. Jude Endowed Chair in Bioinformatics at the St. Jude Children's Research Hospital. She was elected a fellow of the International Society for Computational Biology in 2023.
