= Jennifer Grandis =

American otolaryngologist

- Born: 1960 (age 65–66)

Academic background
- Education: BA, Biology, 1982, Swarthmore College; MD, 1987, University of Pittsburgh

Jennifer Rubin Grandis (born 1960) is an American otolaryngologist, focusing in general otolaryngology and clinical and translational research. Her research interests include diagnosis and treatment of head and neck cancer. She is a Full professor at the University of California, San Francisco having previously worked as the UPMC Endowed Chair at University of Pittsburgh.

== Early life and education ==
Grandis was born in 1960. She earned her Bachelor of Arts degree from Swarthmore College in 1982 before enrolling at the University of Pittsburgh (UPitt) for her medical degree. She completed her residency at the UPMC Department of Otolaryngology in 1993 and became a research fellow for the School of Medicine's Division of Infectious Diseases in 1991.

== Career ==
Following her residency and fellowship, Grandis accepted a faculty position at the University of Pittsburgh and was elected a member of the American Society for Clinical Investigation. During her tenure at Pitt, Grandis developed a personalized medicine approach to studying head and neck squamous cell carcinoma by looking at underlying genetic abnormalities in an individual's cancer. In recognition of her efforts, she became the first American Cancer Society - Genentech BioOncology Clinical Research Professor for Translational Research. The following year, while serving as the UPMC Endowed Chair in Head and Neck Cancer Surgical Research, Grandis was the recipient of a Chancellor's Distinguished Research Award.

By 2010, Grandis' alternate approach to develop a new DNA therapy for head and neck cancers was approved by the U.S. Patent and Trademark Office. The therapy targets the epidermal growth factor receptor (EGFR), a protein found on the surface of many types of cancer cells that causes them to multiply. Grandis was eventually appointed Distinguished Professor and Vice Chair for Research in the Department of Otolaryngology, where she was elected a Member of the Institute of Medicine. In 2014, Grandis and her husband accepted faculty positions at the University of California, San Francisco. She became the Associate Vice Chancellor of Clinical and Translational Research, and her husband joined the faculty in the Division of Cardiology.

In 2019, Grandis continued to study diagnosis and treatment of head and neck cancer and published the first study to show a strong clinical advantage of regular NSAID use for head and neck cancer patients with mutations in the PIK3CA gene. In recognition of her efforts, she was the recipient of the 2019 AACR-Women in Cancer Research Charlotte Friend Memorial Lectureship. The following year, Grandis accepted an appointment as a Special Consultant to National Institute on Deafness and Other Communication Disorders Director Debara L. Tucci. The aim of her appointment was to "collaborate to determine future directions of the clinical program, advise on clinical trials, and add value with regard to data management."

== Personal life ==
Grandis and her husband Don have two children together; a son and daughter.
