= Andrew Paul Feinberg =

American epigenetics academic

- Born: August 5, 1952
- Education: Johns Hopkins University
- Known for: cancer epigenetics
- Scientific career
- Workplaces: Johns Hopkins University; University of Michigan

Andrew Paul Feinberg (born August 5, 1952) is the director of the Center for Epigenetics, chief of the Division of Molecular Medicine in the Department of Medicine, and the King Fahd Professor of Medicine, Oncology, and Molecular Biology & Genetics in the School of Medicine at Johns Hopkins University. He is the Bloomberg Distinguished Professor of Epigenetics. He holds appointments in the Departments of Medicine, Oncology, Molecular Biology & Genetics, and Psychiatry & Behavioral Sciences in the School of Medicine; in the Departments of Mental Health and Biostatistics in the Bloomberg School of Public Health; and in the Department of Biomedical Engineering in the Whiting School of Engineering.

Feinberg is known for research on the role of epigenetic alterations in cancer, including the identification of widespread DNA methylation abnormalities and the role of genomic imprinting in tumor development. Feinberg’s research demonstrated that large-scale epigenomic alterations—including global DNA hypomethylation and partially methylated domains—contribute to tumor initiation, progression, and cellular heterogeneity. This work contributed to the development of the concept of epigenetic plasticity as a driver of cancer evolution. Feinberg's research has contributed to understanding the role of the epigenome as a central driver of cancer biology, identified causal epigenetic mechanisms for cancer risk and progression, and foundations for new approaches to cancer detection, prevention, and therapeutic intervention. He has also studied the epigenetics of common disease generally, with applications to metabolic, immunologic, and neuropsychiatric disease, and the integration of genetic risk with environmental exposure through the epigenome.

== Early life and education ==
Feinberg completed the Yale University Directed Studies intensive program from 1969 to 1972, and received his B.A. in 1973 and M.D. in 1976 from the accelerated medical program at Johns Hopkins University, as well as an M.P.H. from Johns Hopkins in 1981. He completed his residency in internal medicine, followed by a fellowship in genetics at Hopkins. He completed a postdoctoral fellowship in developmental biology at University of California, San Diego, where he researched the multiple differentiation paths of Dictyostelium discoideum. His research into cancer epigenetics and inheritance of traits other than by DNA was initially seen as controversial, and he was told that if he continued this work, his funding would be cut off.

== Career ==
Feinberg discovered epigenetic alterations in human cancer with Bert Vogelstein in 1983 at Johns Hopkins University. This work stemmed from Feinberg's hypothesis that epigenetic changes could underlie plasticity in cancer processes such as invasion and metastasis, drawing on his earlier research on developmental plasticity in Dictyostelium discoideum. This discovery provided evidence that loss of DNA methylation (hypomethylation) is a consistent feature of human tumors, contributing to the development of the field of cancer epigenetics. He is also credited with the discovery of some genes subject to gene imprinting in humans, the role of loss of gene imprinting in cancer, and the role of epigenetic variants in common disease generally.

From 1986 to 1994, Feinberg served as a Howard Hughes Medical Institute (HHMI) Investigator at the University of Michigan, where he continued his work in epigenetics. During this period, he discovered the molecular basis of Beckwith-Wiedemann Syndrome (BWS), reporting that this overgrowth disorder results from disruption of imprinted genes on chromosome 11p15. This work provided evidence for a role of epigenetics in cancer and helped establish the role of epigenetic mechanisms in human disease beyond cancer.

In 1994, Feinberg returned to Johns Hopkins University as King Fahd Professor of Molecular Medicine in the Department of Medicine. He subsequently founded and became director of the Center for Epigenetics at Johns Hopkins, the first dedicated NIH-funded Epigenome Center for epigenetics in the United States. In 2015, he was named a Bloomberg Distinguished Professor at Johns Hopkins University.

== Research ==
Feinberg has made contributions to understanding how epigenetic changes drive cancer development and progression. His early work found that cancer cells routinely exhibit hypomethylation, a decrease in the number of methyl groups added to DNA. Feinberg also discovered that epigenetic disruptions occur in immature cells called progenitor cells early in cancer development, often before the genetic mutations traditionally associated with cancer appear. This finding suggested that many different types of cancer may share a common underlying basis rooted in epigenetic changes.

Feinberg's research has examined how genomic imprinting contributes to human disease. His laboratory discovered that the gene IGF2, which promotes cell growth, is normally active only when inherited from the father. In some individuals, however, this gene becomes abnormally active on both parental copies, a phenomenon called "loss of imprinting." Feinberg reported that this epigenetic change is responsible for increased cancer risk in children with Beckwith-Wiedemann syndrome, a childhood overgrowth disorder, and that the disorder is also associated with in vitro fertilization. This work provided evidence that epigenetic changes are not only a consequence of cancer but can cause it by expanding the population of cells that are vulnerable to becoming cancerous. This work also led to the first epigenetic test for cancer predisposition.

His findings suggest that loss of imprinting may also contribute to common adult cancers, indicating that epigenetic alterations may be an important mechanism in cancer development. He has also conducted studies of the role of epigenetic entropy, developing mathematical methods to identify the genes responsible for cancer plasticity in acute lymphoblastic leukemia and other cancers.

Feinberg's work has contributed to the development of the field of epigenomics, which studies epigenetic changes across the entire genome rather than individual genes. He has proposed that epigenetics contributes generally to disease by disrupting phenotypic plasticity. He founded the first epigenome center in the United States supported by the National Institutes of Health. His laboratory has made several discoveries, including the identification of DNA regions called CpG island shores that drive gene expression differences that distinguish different tissues in the body from each other and from cancer. Feinberg's recent cancer research has focused on pancreatic ductal adenocarcinoma (PDAC), reporting that metastases arise through epigenetic change in the absence of additional new driver mutations. He has reported a cascade of epigenetic modulators, modifiers, and mediators that drive metastasis that may represent new therapeutic targets for cancer treatment. Feinberg discovered the role of partially methylated domains in driving epigenetic instability, leading to hypermethylated CpG islands, and hypomethylated CpG island shores.

Feinberg's team created the first comprehensive map of epigenetic marks during normal blood cell development, which correspond to the sites of differential methylation in stem cell reprogramming. Feinberg's research has also expanded to investigate the role of epigenetic changes in diseases other than cancer, including autoimmune, metabolic, and neuropsychiatric diseases.

He has proposed that stochasticity, as measured by epigenetic entropy, is a driver of evolution in a changing environment. His team has shown that epigenetic entropy plays a role in cancer and aging.

In collaboration with David Threadgill at Texas A&M University, Feinberg discovered that a substantial fraction of epigenetic inheritance occurs through non-Mendelian mechanisms of epigenetic inheritance. He also reported their transmission across multiple generations, including evidence for naturally occurring paramutation in mammals, where the epigenetic pattern of one parental allele is copied onto the other allele and transmitted to the next generation.

Feinberg was a principal investigator on NASA's Twins Study, which examined astronaut Scott Kelly during his year-long mission aboard the International Space Station, comparing his physiological and molecular changes to his identical twin brother Mark Kelly, who remained on Earth. Feinberg's team analyzed epigenetic changes during spaceflight, contributing to understanding the biological effects of long-duration space travel.

== Awards ==
- 1981 - Delta Omega, National Public Health Honorary Society
- 1990 - American Society for Clinical Investigation
- 1992 - Founding Fellow, American College of Medical Genetics
- 1995 - Association of American Physicians
- 2001 - ISI, Most Cited Authors List (Top 0.1%)
- 2001 - MERIT Award, National Cancer Institute
- 2007 - Elected Member of the Institute of Medicine of the National Academy of Sciences
- 2007 - Elected Member of the National Academy of Medicine
- 2007 - Doctor of Philosophy (Honoris Causa), Uppsala University, Sweden
- 2009 - Wallenberg Fellow, Royal Swedish Academy of Sciences
- 2009 - Elected Fellow of the American Academy of Arts and Sciences
- 2010 - Doctor of Medicine (Honoris Causa), Karolinska Institutet, Sweden
- 2011 - Inaugural Daniel Coit Gilman Scholar, Johns Hopkins University
- 2011 - Feodor Lynen Medal
- 2011 - NIH Director's Pioneer Award
- 2011 - Elected Fellow of the American Association for the Advancement of Science
- 2013 - Baruch Spinoza Chair, University of Amsterdam
- 2016 - Doctor of Philosophy (Honoris Causa), University of Amsterdam
- 2017 - Award for Excellence in Molecular Diagnostics, Association for Molecular Pathology,
- 2022-23 - Harvey Prize in Science and Technology (jointly with Stephen Baylin and Peter Jones) for their seminal contributions to the field of Cancer Epigenetics.
- 2024 - Elected Fellow, American Institute for Medical and Biological Engineering
- 2026 - AACR-G.H.A. Clowes Award for Outstanding Basic Cancer Research

== Publications ==
Feinberg has more than 127,000 citations in Google Scholar and an h-index of 130. He is listed by ScholarGPS as #3,408 most cited across all fields, and #2 in epigenetics.

- Pubmed citations
- Google Scholar citations

Selected Publications

- 1983 with B Vogelstein, Hypomethylation distinguishes genes of some human cancers from their normal counterparts, in: Nature. Vol. 301, nº 5895; 89-92.
- 1993 with S Rainier, LA Johnson, CJ Dobry, AJ Ping, PE Grundy, Relaxation of imprinted genes in human cancer, in: Nature. Vol 362; 747-749.
- 1994 with MJ Steenman, S Rainier, CJ Dobry, AJ Ping, PE Grundy, Loss of imprinting of IGF2 is linked to reduced expression and abnormal methylation of H19 in Wilms' tumour, in: Nature Genetics. Vol. 7; 433-439.
- 2007, Phenotypic plasticity and the epigenetics of human disease, in: Nature. Vol. 447, nº 7143; 433-440.
- 2009 with R Irizarry, C Ladd-Acosta, B Wen, Z Wu, C Montano, P Onyango, H Cui, K Gabo, M Rongione, M Webster, H Ji, J Potash, S Sabunciyan, Genome-wide methylation analysis of human colon cancer reveals similar hypo- and hypermethylation at conserved tissue-specific CpG island shores, in: Nature Genetics. Vol. 41; 178-186.
- 2010 with H Ji, LIR Ehrlich, J Seita, P Murakami, A Doi, P Lindau, H Lee, MJ Aryee, K Kim, DJ Rossi, MA Inlay, T Serwold, H Karsunky, L Ho, GQ Daley, IL Weissman, Comprehensive methylome map of lineage commitment from hematopoietic progenitors, in: Nature. Vol. 467; 285-290.
- 2011 with KD Hansen, W Timp, HC Bravo, S Sabunciyan, B Langmead, OG McDonald, B Wen, H Wu, Y Liu, D Diep, E Briem, K Zhang, RA Irizarry, Increased variation in epigenetic domains across cancer types, in: Nature Genetics. Vol. 43; 768-775.
- 2013 with Y Liu, JM Aryee, L Padyukov, MD Fallin, E Hesselberg, A Runarsson, L Reinius, N Acevedo, M Taub, M Rönninger, K Shchetynsky, A Scheynius, J Kere, L Alfredsson, L Klareskog, TJ Ekström, Epigenome-wide association data implicates DNA methylation as an intermediary of genetic risk in rheumatoid arthritis, in: Nature Biotechnology. Vol. 31; 142-147.
- 2017 with OG McDonald, X Li, T Saunders, R Tryggvadottir, SJ Mentch, MO Warmoes, AE Word, A Carrer, TH Salz, S Natsume, KM Stauffer, A Makohon-Moore, Y Zhong, H Wu, KE Wellen, JW Locasale, C Iacobuzio-Donahue, Large-scale epigenomic reprogramming links anabolic glucose metabolism to distant metastasis during the evolution of pancreatic cancer progression, in: Nature Genetics. Vol. 49; 367-376.
- 2017 with G Jenkinson, E Pujadas, J Goutsias, Potential energy landscapes identify the information-theoretic nature of the epigenome, in: Nature Genetics. Vol. 49; 719-729.
