= Joseph R. Bertino =

American cancer researcher (1930–2021)

- Born: August 16, 1930; Port Chester, New York, U.S.
- Died: October 11, 2021 (aged 91)
- Education: University of Washington School of Medicine
- Spouse: Mary (d. 2011)
- Children: 4
- Scientific career
- Workplaces: SUNY Downstate College of Medicine; Yale Cancer Center; Memorial Sloan-Kettering; Cancer Institute of New Jersey

Joseph Rocco Bertino (August 16, 1930 – October 11, 2021) was an American researcher in the cancer pharmacology program at Rutgers Cancer Institute of New Jersey and professor of medicine and pharmacology at the Robert Wood Johnson Medical School in New Jersey. His research focused on the treatment of lymphoma.

== Early life and education ==
Joseph Rocco Bertino was born in Port Chester, New York on August 16, 1930, as the youngest son of Joseph and Mamie Bertino. His parents immigrated from Italy shortly before World War I.

After graduating from medical school at SUNY Downstate College of Medicine in 1954, Bertino did a USPHS fellowship in hematology and oncology at the University of Washington School of Medicine. In 1958, he moved to Seattle to work with Clement A. Finch and Frank M. Huennekens.

Bertino had four children with his wife, Mary, who died in 2011. He died on October 11, 2021, at the age of 91.

Bertino was the grandfather of American singer Niia.

== Career ==
From 1973 to 1975, Bertino was the director of the Yale Cancer Center, until he was made an American Cancer Society Research Professor. He remained at Yale until 1987. Following this, he was the chair of the Molecular Pharmacology and Therapeutics Program at Memorial Sloan-Kettering until 2002, when he moved to the Cancer Institute of New Jersey.

Some of Bertino's notable scientific accomplishments are research into methotrexate and resistance to cancer treatments, including that use of methotrexate leads to an increase in dihydrofolate reductase. He is a founding editor of the Journal of Clinical Oncology.

== Awards ==
- 1975 President of the American Society for Clinical Oncology
- 1976-1979 Member, AACR Board of Directors
- 1978 AACR–Richard and Hinda Rosenthal Award
- 1992 David A. Karnofsky Memorial Award (American Society of Clinical Oncology)
- 1995-1996 President of the American Association for Cancer Research
- 2004 Freundlich Leadership Award (Lymphoma Research Foundation)
- 2006 Key to the Cure Award (Lymphoma Research Foundation)
- 2007 Bob Pinedo Cancer Care Prize for Contributions to Improvements in Cancer Care
- 2007 ASCO Statesman Award
- 2008 John Ultman Award for Contributions to Lymphoma Research
- 2008 AACR–Joseph H. Burchenal Memorial Award
- 2011 Jeffrey A. Gottlieb Memorial Award (MD Anderson Cancer Center)
- 2013 Elected fellow of the AACR Academy
- 2018 AACR Award for Lifetime Achievement in Cancer Research
