= Margaret Shipp =

American oncologist

Academic background
- Education: B.A., English and Biology, 1975, Southern Methodist University; MD, 1979, Washington University School of Medicine

Academic work
- Institutions: Harvard Medical School; Dana–Farber Cancer Institute
- Website: shipplab.dfci.harvard.edu

Margaret Ann Shipp is an American hematologic oncologist. She is the Douglas S. Miller Chair in Hodgkin Lymphoma at Harvard Medical School. Shipp is an elected Fellow of the American Society for Clinical Investigation and National Academy of Medicine.

== Early life and education ==
Shipp earned her Bachelor of Arts degree in English and biology in 1975 from Southern Methodist University. Following this, she completed her medical degree at Washington University School of Medicine in 1979. Shipp then completed an internship and residency in internal medicine at Barnes-Jewish Hospital.

== Career ==
Upon graduating, Shipp joined the faculty at Dana–Farber Cancer Institute and Harvard Medical School. In 1996, Shipp was elected a Fellow of the American Society for Clinical Investigation. She was eventually named chief of the Division of Hematologic Neoplasia at Dana-Farber. In this role, she found a molecular "signature" in a form of lymphoma that identified patients unlikely to respond well to standard chemotherapy, and who could benefit from treatment with certain experimental targeted drugs. Following this, Shipp's research team found that serum galectin-1 levels were "significantly associated with tumor burden and additional adverse clinical characteristics in newly diagnosed Hodgkin lymphoma (HL) patients." As such, they developed antibodies that recognize the galectin-1 protein and were used in developing the sandwich ELISA assay.

In 2014, as chief of the Division of Hematological Neoplasia at Dana-Farber and director of the Lymphoma Program at Dana-Farber/Harvard Cancer Center, Shipp was elected a member of the National Academy of Medicine. Following her appointment, Shipp and her colleagues led a study on the successfulness of nivolumab, which prompted the Food and Drug Administration to designate it a "breakthrough therapy" for treating relapsed Hodgkin lymphoma. By the start of 2017, nivolumab had been FDA-approved for use on individuals with Hodgkin lymphoma, melanoma, non-small cell lung cancer, bladder cancer, kidney cancer, and squamous cell cancer of the head and neck. Following this, she oversaw a study showing that Hodgkin lymphomas frequently avoid immune detection by eliminating their MHC class I proteins.

During the COVID-19 pandemic, Shipp and her colleague Scott J. Rodig earned a Blood Cancer Discoveries Grant to map the immune microenvironment in classical Hodgkin lymphoma.
