= Margaret L. Kripke =

American immunologist

- Born: July 21, 1943
- Education: University of California at Berkeley (BSc, MS, PhD)
- Known for: Immunology of skin cancer
- Scientific career
- Fields: Immunology, photoimmunology
- Workplaces: National Cancer Institute; University of Texas MD Anderson Cancer Center

Margaret Louise Kripke (Born July 21, 1943) is an American immunologist. She is an expert in photoimmunology and the immunology of skin cancers. She earned a BS and MS in bacteriology, and a Ph.D in immunology, at the University of California at Berkeley.

== Early life ==
Kripke was born on July 21, 1943 in Concord, California.

== Career ==
She founded the department of immunology at The University of Texas M. D. Anderson Cancer Center in 1983, and served as the cancer center's executive vice president and chief academic officer until her retirement in 2007. After her retirement, Kripke served as special advisor to the provost. From 1993 to 1994, Kripke served as president of the American Association for Cancer Research.

In 2008, M. D. Anderson established the Margaret Kripke Legend Award "to honor individuals who have enhanced the careers of women in cancer medicine and cancer science".

She served on the President's Cancer Panel from 2003 to 2011. The panel's 2006-2007 report, Promoting Healthy Lifestyles, urged "that the influence of the tobacco industry – particularly on America’s children – be weakened through strict Federal regulation of tobacco product sales and marketing". The panel's 2008-2009 report, Reducing Environmental Cancer Risk: What We Can Do Now, "for the first time highlights the contribution of environmental contaminants to the development of cancer". A 2021 video describes how Dr. Kripke came to rethink her assumptions about the causes of cancer.

In 2013, she was named a Fellow of the American Association for Cancer Research Academy.

From 2012 through 2016, she was the chief scientific officer of the Cancer Prevention and Research Institute of Texas.

She has served on the board of directors of Silent Spring Institute.

In 2020, Kripke called upon the National Cancer Institute to publish information about cancer risks from exposure to chemicals in the environment.

== Bibliography ==
=== Publication Lists ===
- JSTOR.org
- Researchgate.net
- Google Scholar

=== Books ===
- Kripke, Margaret L. (1986). Immunology and Cancer. University of Texas Press. ISBN 9780292738416.
- Bishop, Julia A. Newton; Kripke, Margaret L.; Leigh, Irene M. (1996). Skin Cancer. Cold Spring Harbor Laboratory Press. ISBN 9780879694838.
- Google Books list
