= Vanderbilt-Ingram Cancer Center =

Cancer center in Nashville, Tennessee, U.S.

Geography
- Location: Nashville, Tennessee]], U.S.
- Coordinates: 36°08′26″N 86°48′14″W

Organisation
- Type: Specialist
- Network: National Comprehensive Cancer Network

Services
- Speciality: Cancer

History
- Former name: Vanderbilt Cancer Center
- Opened: 1993

Links
- Lists: Hospitals in U.S.

The Vanderbilt-Ingram Cancer Center is an NCI-designated Comprehensive Cancer Center in Nashville, Tennessee, United States. It is part of the Vanderbilt University Medical Center.

The Vanderbilt Cancer Center was established in 1993 and received its initial NCI designation in 1995. It was renamed the Vanderbilt-Ingram Cancer Center in 1999 after a significant donation from the Ingram family. The center received its NCI "comprehensive" cancer center status in 2001. VICC has more than 280 faculty members involved in the research and treatment of cancer. The center receives more than $140 million annually in federal research funding, landing it among the top ten in the nation for federal research grants.

On August 25, 2026, American singer and songwriter Dolly Parton died of cancer at the center.

VICC is also a member of the National Comprehensive Cancer Network.

VICC sponsors a number of clinical trials.
