= Keith Flaherty =

Professor of medicine

Keith Flaherty is Director of Clinical Research at the Massachusetts General Hospital Cancer Center and Professor of Medicine at Harvard Medical School. He was previously a professor of medicine at the University of Pennsylvania. He is known for his research on targeted therapies for cancer, and in particular for his work on the melanoma drug vemurafenib. In 2013, Massachusetts General Hospital partnered with AstraZeneca to partner Flaherty's research into developing a formula to identify vulnerabilities of tumors with AstraZeneca's library of drugs.
