= Dannielle Engle =

American biologist

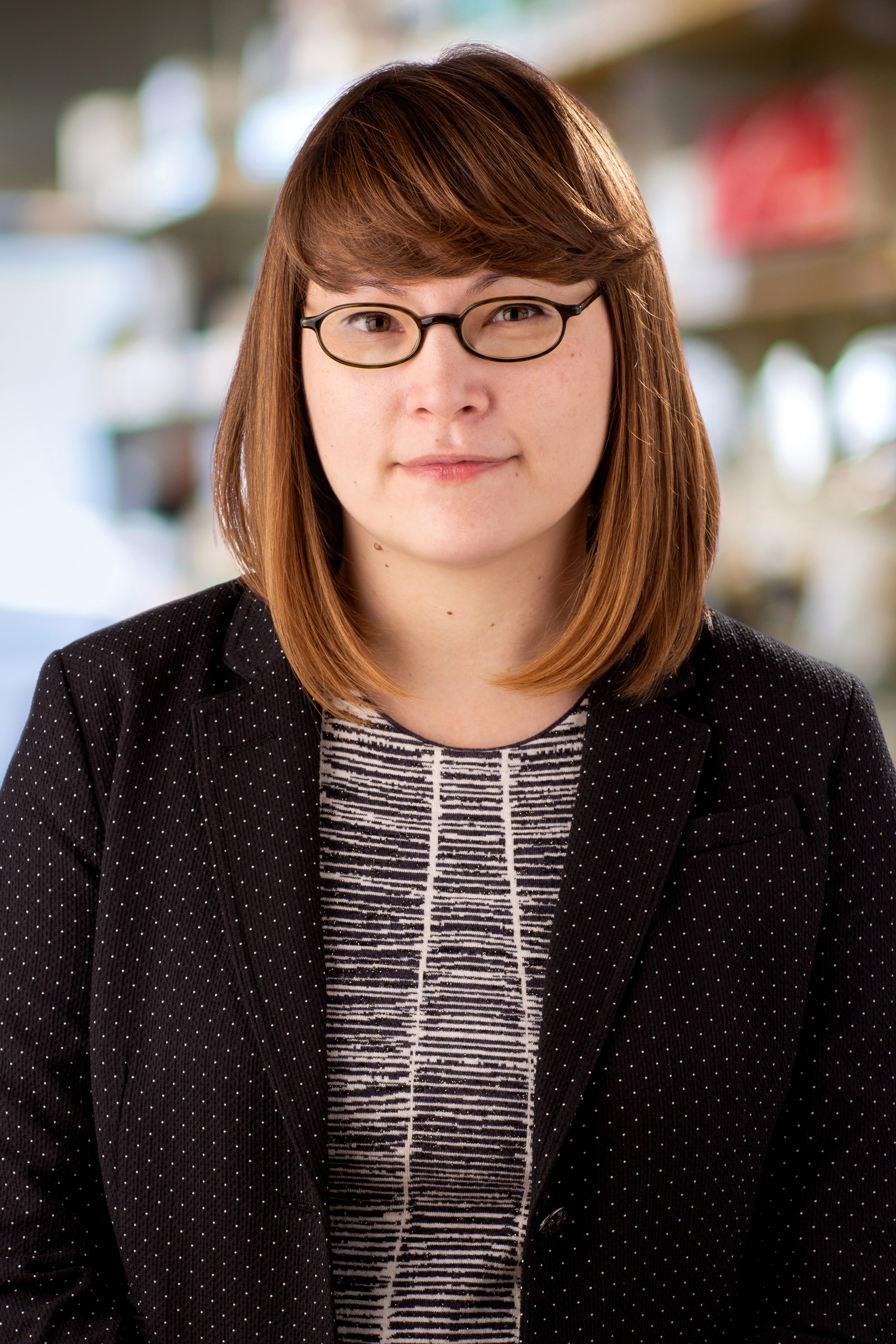
- Education: Northwestern University, University of California San Diego
- Known for: Advancing models of pancreatic cancer
- Awards: 2016 - 2018 NIH NCI Career Transition K99/R00 Award, 2009 -2011 California Breast Cancer Research Program Fellowship, 2005 - 2009 UCSD Chancellor’s Fellowship
- Scientific career
- Fields: Cancer biology
- Workplaces: Salk Institute for Biological Studies

Dannielle Engle is an American biologist and assistant professor of the regulatory biology laboratory at the Salk Institute for Biological Studies. Engle's research aims to improve detection and treatment of pancreatic cancer.

== Early life and education ==
Engle started her undergraduate degree at Northwestern University in music as a violinist. She then changed her path to explore biology and conducted undergraduate research in genetics studying fruit flies. Engle graduated from Northwestern with degrees in both biological sciences and asian studies. After her undergraduate degree, Engle pursued graduate school at the University of California San Diego. During this time, Engle lost her father to pancreatic cancer and dedicated her career to pancreatic cancer research. She joined the lab of Dr. Geoffrey M. Walh at the Salk Institute for Biological Studies in order to begin her career in cancer biology studying the mammogenesis in stem cells due to the similarity in cellular processes to cancer progression. After graduate school, Engle moved to the United Kingdom to complete her postdoctoral studies under the mentorship of Dr. David Tuveson at the Cambridge Research Institute. There she developed pancreas organ human mouse hybrid cultures in order to identify pancreatic cancer markers. She finished her time in the lab back in the United States after helping move the lab to Cold Spring Harbor Laboratory where she held the title of Senior Research Fellow and became a Lustgarten Foundation Pancreatic Cancer Research Laboratory Ambassador through her community outreach efforts. During her postdoctoral studies, Engle focused her efforts on probing a specific carbohydrate antigen, CA19-9, released by pancreatic tumor cells. CA19-9 served as a biomarker for pancreatic cancer, but Engle demonstrated that blocking CA19-9 reduced the severity of the pancreatitis. Engle also pioneered studies of pancreatic cancer in organoid pancreas models.

== Career and research ==
In 2019, Engle returned to the Salk as an assistant professor. Her lab is focused on improving detection and treatment of pancreatic cancer which has the highest mortality rate of all major cancers. Since starting in 2019, Engle's lab has begun creating transgenic mouse models of pancreatic cancer that have tumors that express the uniquely human CA19-9 tumor antigen. This will allow the lab to better recapitulate the human tumor environment and move towards better diagnostics and treatments for pancreatic cancer. In 2020, Engle received an award of over $1 million to investigate the links between smoking tobacco and pancreatic cancer. She plans to develop organoid models to study the effect of tobacco on cells and the extent of tobacco exposure correlated to the cancer development.

== Awards and honors ==
- 2021 first recipient of the Lustgarten Foundation-AACR Career Development Award for research in Honor of Ruth Bader Ginsburg
- 2020 New Investigator Award from Tobacco-Related Disease Research Program
- 2019 Skip Viragh Pancreatic Cancer Action Network Career Development Award
- 2016 - 2018 NIH NCI Career Transition K99/R00 Award
- 2009 -2011 California Breast Cancer Research Program Fellowship
- 2005 - 2009 UCSD Chancellor's Fellowship
- Theodore T Puck Award

== Select publications ==
- Ponz-Sarvise, M., Corbo, V., Tiriac, H., Engle, D.D., Frese, K.K., Oni, T.E., Hwang, C.I., Öhlund, D., Chio, I.I.C., Baker, L.A., Filippini, D., Wright, K., Bapiro, T.E., Huang, P.S., Smith, P.D., Yu, K.H., Jodrell, D.I., Park, Y., Tuveson, D.A. Identification of Resistance Pathways Specific to Malignancy Using Organoid Models of Pancreatic Cancer. (2019) Clinical Cancer Research. DOI: 10.1158/1078-0432.CCR-19-1398
- Elyada, E., Bolisetty, M., Laise, P., Flynn, W.F., Courtois, E.T., Burkhart, R.A., Teinor, J.A., Belleau, P., Biffi, G., Lucito, M.S., Sivajothi, S., Armstrong, T.D., Engle, D.D., Yu, K.H., Hao, Y., Wolfgang, C.L., Park, Y., Preall, J., Jaffee, E.M., Califano, A., Robson, P., Tuveson, D.A. Cross-Species Single-Cell Analysis of Pancreatic Ductal Adenocarcinoma Reveals Antigen-Presenting Cancer-Associated Fibroblasts. (2019) Cancer Discovery. 9(8):1102-1123. DOI: 10.1158/2159-8290.CD-19-0094
- Engle, D.D., Tiriac, H., Rivera, K.D., Pommier, A., Whalen, S., Oni, T.E., Alagesan, B., Lee, E.J., Yao, M.A., Lucito, M.S., Spielman, B., Da Silva, B., Schoepfer, C., Wright, K., Creighton, B., Afinowicz, L., Yu, K.H., Grützmann, R., Aust, D., Gimotty, P.A., Pollard, K.S., Hruban, R.H., Goggins, M.G., Pilarsky, C., Park, Y., Pappin, D.J., Hollingsworth, M.A., Tuveson, D.A. The glycan CA19-9 promotes pancreatitis and pancreatic cancer in mice. (2019) Science. 364(6446):1156-1162. DOI: 10.1126/science.aaw3145
- Tiriac, H., Belleau, P.*, Engle, D.D.*, Plenker, D., Deschênes, A., Somerville, T.D.D., Froeling, F.E.M., Burkhart, R.A., Denroche, R.E., Jang, G.H., Miyabayashi, K., Young, C.M., Patel, H., Ma, M., LaComb, J.F., Palmaira, R.L.D., Javed, A.A., Huynh, J.C., Johnson, M., Arora, K., Robine, N., Shah, M., Sanghvi, R., Goetz, A.B., Lowder, C.Y., Martello, L., Driehuis, E., LeComte, N., Askan, G., Iacobuzio-Donahue, C.A., Clevers, H., Wood, L.D., Hruban, R.H., Thompson, E., Aguirre, A.J., Wolpin, B.M., Sasson, A., Kim, J., Wu, M., Bucobo, J.C., Allen, P., Sejpal, D.V., Nealon, W., Sullivan, J.D., Winter, J.M., Gimotty, P.A., Grem, J.L., DiMaio, D.J., Buscaglia, J.M., Grandgenett, P.M., Brody, J.R., Hollingsworth, M.A., O'Kane, G.M., Notta, F., Kim, E., Crawford, J.M., Devoe, C., Ocean, A., Wolfgang, C.L., Yu, K.H., Li, E., Vakoc, C.R., Hubert, B., Fischer, S.E., Wilson, J.M., Moffitt, R., Knox, J., Krasnitz, A., Gallinger, S., Tuveson, D.A. Organoid Profiling Identifies Common Responders to Chemotherapy in Pancreatic Cancer. (2018) Cancer Discovery. 8(9):1112-1129. DOI: 10.1158/2159-8290.CD-18-0349
- Quaranta, V., Rainer, C., Nielsen, S.R., Raymant, M.L., Ahmed, M.S., Engle, D.D., Taylor, A., Murray, T., Campbell, F., Palmer, D.H., Tuveson, D.A., Mielgo, A., Schmid, M.C. Macrophage-Derived Granulin Drives Resistance to Immune Checkpoint Inhibition in Metastatic Pancreatic Cancer. (2018) Cancer Research. 78(15):4253-4269. DOI: 10.1158/0008-5472.CAN-17-3876
- Wolff, R.A.*, Wang-Gillam, A.*, Alvarez, H.*, Tiriac, H.*, Engle, D.*, Hou, S.*, Groff, A.F., San Lucas, A., Bernard, V., Allenson, K., Castillo, J., Kim, D., Mulu, F., Huang, J., Stephens, B., Wistuba, I.I., Katz, M., Varadhachary, G., Park, Y., Hicks, J., Chinnaiyan, A., Scampavia, L., Spicer, T., Gerhardinger, C., Maitra, A., Tuveson, D., Rinn, J., Lizee, G., Yee, C., Levine, A.J. Dynamic changes during the treatment of pancreatic cancer. (2018) Oncotarget. 9(19):14764-14790. DOI: 10.18632/oncotarget.24483
