= Harvey R. Gaylord =

American pathologist and cancer researcher (1872-1924)

Harvey Russell Gaylord
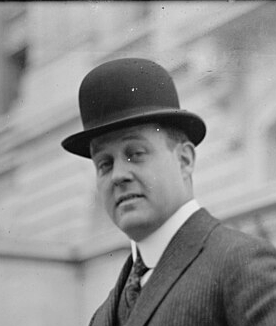
- Harvey R. Gaylord in 1914
- Born: October 4, 1872; Saginaw, Michigan
- Died: June 21, 1924 (aged 51); Watkins Glen, New York
- Education: University of Pennsylvania (MD)
- Known for: Use of X-rays and radium in cancer therapy; cancer immunity; autopsy of President McKinley
- Scientific career
- Fields: Cancer research, pathology
- Workplaces: New York State Institute for the Study of Malignant Disease; University at Buffalo

Harvey Russell Gaylord (October 4, 1872 – June 21, 1924) was an American pathologist and cancer researcher. He served as director of the New York State Institute for the Study of Malignant Disease in Buffalo, New York, now Roswell Park Comprehensive Cancer Center, and was a founding member of the American Association for Cancer Research.

== Early life and education ==
Gaylord was born on October 4, 1872 in Saginaw, Michigan to Augustine Smith Gaylord and Emmeline Ellen Warren. He was educated at Cheltenham Military Academy in Ogontz, Pennsylvania, and received his medical degree from the University of Pennsylvania in 1893. He subsequently undertook postgraduate study at Johns Hopkins University and served as an intern at a hospital in Philadelphia.

Gaylord later studied pathology at the University of Göttingen in Germany under Ludwig Aschoff. He subsequently became an instructor in pathology at Göttingen. With Aschoff, he was the co-author of The Principles of Pathological Histology, published in 1901.

== Career ==
Gaylord returned to the United States in 1898 and became responsible for research at the New York State Pathological Laboratory in Buffalo. While there, he participated in the autopsy performed on President William McKinley following his assassination in 1901. The laboratory was associated with the work of surgeon Roswell Park and became an important center for the study of cancer.

Gaylord subsequently became director of the New York State Institute for the Study of Malignant Disease. During his tenure, the institution expanded its facilities for laboratory and clinical research into cancer. He also held a professorship of pathology at the University at Buffalo. Gaylord's research focused on the pathology and experimental biology of cancer. He investigated the microscopic characteristics of malignant tumors and the possible causes of cancer, including theories involving infectious agents and transmissibility. He also conducted experimental investigations into immunity to cancer.

Gaylord was an early investigator of radiation therapy, including the use of radium and high-voltage X-ray treatment for cancer. In 1921, he traveled to Europe to study high-voltage X-ray therapy.

Gaylord was one of the founders of the American Association for Cancer Research, established in 1907. He served two terms as the organization's president, first in 1909-1910 and again in 1916-1917. During his second term as president, the AACR launched The Journal of Cancer Research in 1916, the first cancer journal published in English. During his presidency, Gaylord advocated for increased support for cancer research and encouraged greater governmental involvement in the investigation of cancer.

== Personal life and death ==
Gaylord married Bessie May Ketchum of Saginaw, Michigan in 1893. During World War I, he served in the United States Army Medical Corps with the rank of major and was later assigned as a surgeon to the 99th Division. He and his wife had three sons, Bradley, Harvey R. Jr., and Charles.

Gaylord died at age 51 on June 21, 1924 in Watkins Glen, New York. He was survived by his wife and three sons.

== Selected publications ==
- Gaylord, Harvey R.; Aschoff, Ludwig (1901). The Principles of Pathological Histology. Philadelphia and New York: Lea Brothers & Co. National Library of Medicine.
- Gaylord, Harvey R. (1901). "Remarks on the Work of the Buffalo Laboratory on the Investigation of Cancer". Buffalo Medical Journal. 40 (8): 549–553. PubMed.
- Gaylord, Harvey R.; Marsh, Millard C. (1914). Carcinoma of the Thyroid in the Salmonoid Fishes. Washington, D.C.: Government Printing Office. Internet Archive.
