= Antoni Ribas (professor) =

Spanish-American physician–scientist

- Born: Barcelona, Spain

Academic background
- Education: Universidad de Barcelona (MD); Autonomous University of Barcelona (PhD)

Antoni Ribas is a Spanish American physician–scientist. He is a Professor of Medicine, Surgery, and Molecular and Medical Pharmacology at the University of California, Los Angeles (UCLA) and Director of the Tumor Immunology Program at the Jonsson Comprehensive Cancer Center. Ribas served as president of the American Association for Cancer Research (AACR) in 2021–2022.

== Early life and education ==
Ribas grew up in Barcelona, Spain, where he attended the Universidad de Barcelona for his medical degree and Autonomous University of Barcelona for his PhD. In 1996, he travelled to the United States to seek a fellowship in hematology/oncology at the University of California, Los Angeles (UCLA). Upon completing two fellowships at UCLA, Ribas accepted a faculty position at the institution.

== Career ==
As an assistant professor of medicine and surgery, Ribas focused his research into cancer stem cells to develop biological therapies against cancer. In 2014, Ribas studied how the immune system responds and develops resistance to different immunotherapies, and how treatments might be improved by combining different regimens. He co-published a study with David Elashoff regarding a new methodology to predict why some patients with advanced melanoma. They developed an algorithm that predicted the likelihood of patient response to the treatment and worked to develop a more effective drug with which to target them. Two years later, Ribas and his research team published a study identifying the mechanisms used by advanced melanoma cells to avoid recognition by the immune system's T cells. He was subsequently awarded the Richard and Hinda Rosenthal Memorial Award from the American Association for Cancer Research (AACR) and Outstanding Investigator Award from the National Cancer Institute (NCI). His award came with a $4.2 million grant to support his cancer research.

During the 2017–18 academic year, Ribas and Siwen Hu-Lieskovan published a study that found that more than two-thirds of people with a rare type of melanoma responded positively to treatment with anti-PD-1 immunotherapies. Later that year, he published the first explanation of immunoediting in colon cancer so researchers could target those genetic changes. In April, Ribas was the recipient of the AACR-Cancer Research Institute Lloyd J. Old Award in Cancer Immunology and was honored by the Carnegie Corporation of New York as part of their Great Immigrants Initiative, a program honoring a selected group of naturalized citizens who have made notable contributions to the progress of American society.

On March 28, 2019, Ribas was named the 2019–2020 president-elect of the AACR, which meant he would assume the title of President at the 2020 annual meeting. The following month, Ribas was selected by Agilent Technologies for their Thought Leader Award in recognition of his research in cancer genomics and immunotherapy and received a $600,000 gift and research supplies to support his laboratory. He used this award to support his research into combining immunotherapy with two target therapies to extend the lives of people with advanced melanoma. His research team found that people with a type of melanoma that contains a potent gene mutation, BRAF V600E, survived longer without the cancer progressing when they received a combination of two targeted inhibitors that block the BRAF mutation and an immune checkpoint inhibitor drug as their initial treatment. He was again honored for his research in basic and tumor immunology by the Hope Funds for Cancer Research with their 2019 Award of Excellence in Medicine and the 2019 William B. Coley Award from the Cancer Research Institute.

Early in 2020, Ribas published data that suggested using NKTR-214 in combination with an infusion of anti-tumor immune cells may produce a stronger immune response that could help fight advanced melanoma. Later that year, during the COVID-19 pandemic, he was named a Fellow of the AACR and named the 2020 honoree of the European Society for Medical Oncology’s Award for Translational Research. In October 2020, Ribas and researcher Anusha Kalbasi found that using drugs that mimic viruses to overcome immunotherapy resistance in tumors with defective interferon signaling. A few days later, he was elected to the National Academy of Medicine for "defining the mechanistic basis of how patients respond to or develop resistance to immunotherapy drugs known as checkpoint inhibitors and for leading multicenter clinical trials that have provided transformative treatments for patients with advanced melanoma, which was once thought untreatable."

In 2020 and 2021, Ribas served as president of the AACR and was succeeded by David Tuveson.
