= José Baselga =

Spanish oncologist (1959–2021)

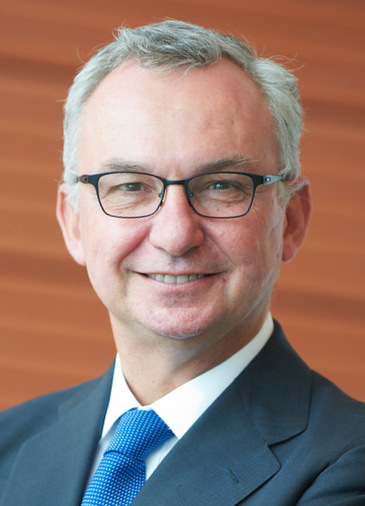
- Baselga in 2013
- Born: 3 July 1959; Barcelona, Catalonia, Spain
- Died: 21 March 2021 (aged 61); Cerdanya, Catalonia, Spain
- Education: Autonomous University of Barcelona
- Scientific career
- Fields: Oncology
- Workplaces: Memorial Sloan Kettering Cancer Center; Weill Cornell Medicine; Mass General Hospital

Josep Baselga i Torres, known in Spanish as José Baselga (3 July 1959 – 21 March 2021), was a Spanish medical oncologist and researcher focused on the development of novel molecular targeted agents, with a special emphasis in breast cancer. Through his career he was associated with the Memorial Sloan Kettering Cancer Center, Vall d'Hebron Institute of Oncology, and the Massachusetts General Hospital in their hematology and oncology divisions. He led the development of the breast cancer treatment Herceptin, a monoclonal antibody, that targets the HER2 protein, which is impacted in aggressive breast cancers.

He served as Physician-in-Chief at the Memorial Sloan Kettering Cancer Center and was also the president of the American Association for Cancer Research.

== Early life ==
Baselga was born on 3 July 1959, in Barcelona in Spain. He received his M.D. and Ph.D. degrees from the Autonomous University of Barcelona in 1982. He completed a fellowship in Medical Oncology at Memorial Sloan-Kettering Cancer Center in New York, and subsequently stayed on as a faculty member of its Breast Medicine Service.

== Career ==
Baselga started his career with the Memorial Sloan Kettering Cancer Center where he worked with John Mendelsohn in studying the role of monoclonal antibodies in the targeting proteins associated with breast and lung cancers. He then returned to Spain, where he established the Vall d'Hebron Institute of Oncology in Barcelona, within the Vall d'Hebron University Hospital. He served as the chairman of the center from 1996 and 2010. During his time there, the institute emerged as a leading center of cancer research, therapies, and early stage clinical trials. Returning to the United States, he served at the Massachusetts General Hospital as the chief of its hematology and oncology divisions between 2010 and 2013. He then returned to the Memorial Sloan Kettering Cancer Center to become its chief medical officer in 2013.

He was appointed physician-in-chief at Memorial Sloan Kettering Cancer Center in 2012, and a professor of medicine at Weill Cornell Medical College in 2013. He held other leadership positions including serving as the president at the American Association for Cancer Research and was the editor of the Cancer Discovery medical journal.

Through his career he was noted for development of targeted cancer treatment capabilities. Specifically, he led the development of the breast cancer treatment Herceptin. The treatment is based on a monoclonal antibody that targets the HER2 protein, which is impacted in aggressive breast cancers. He led the early-stage clinical trial of the drug and led to findings that this targeted treatment along with chemotherapy could extend the lives of patients with HER2 positive breast cancers. He was involved in the clinical development of targeted drugs for cancer including cetuximab, pertuzumab, trastuzumab and lapatinib. His research focus extended to the study of drug resistance in some cancers. He also studied drugs that could target tumors stemming from the PI3K mutation.

He resigned from Memorial Sloan Kettering Cancer Center in September 2018, after an exposé by The New York Times and the non-profit investigative journalism organization ProPublica, which called out that he had failed to report payments to the tune of millions of dollars from healthcare and drug companies in publications including The New England Journal of Medicine and The Lancet. The incident led to the center announcing a rehaul of their conflict of interest policies. The New York Times also reported that the non-profit hospital paid more than $1.5 million in severance to Baselga in 2018 and 2019. Baselga also resigned from the boards of the drug company Bristol Myers Squibb and the radiation equipment firm Varian Medical Systems. He also resigned from his position as co-editor in chief of the journal Cancer Discovery.

Baselga was one of the principal investigators of the Stand Up to Cancer "Dream Team" for "Targeting the PI3K Pathway in Women’s Cancers".

In January 2019, AstraZeneca announced that they had hired Baselga as head of research and development in oncology, where he worked until his death. During this time, he led the company's partnership with Japanese pharmaceutical company Daiichi Sankyo, to develop two cancer treatments in addition to building the company's cancer research capabilities.

== Personal life ==
Baselga was married to Silvia Garriga. The couple had four children and remained married for 30 years before Baselga's death. He died on 21 March 2021 due to complications related to Creutzfeldt–Jakob disease in his home of Cerdanya, province of Girona. He was aged 61.

== Honors and awards ==
- Young Investigator Award, American Society of Clinical Oncology (ASCO) (1992–1993)
- Career Development Award, American Society of Clinical Oncology (ASCO) (1994–1997)
- Elected Member, American Society for Clinical Investigation (2004)
- American Italian Cancer Foundation Prize for Scientific Excellence in Medicine (2007)
- American Association for Cancer Research–Rosenthal Family Foundation Award (2008)
- King Jaime I Award in Medical Research, Valencia, Spain (2008)
- Gold Medal, Queen Sofia Spanish Institute, New York (2010)
- Joseph B. Martin Award, Massachusetts General Hospital, Boston, Massachusetts (2012)
- Elected Member, National Academy of Medicine (2014)
- John Wayne Clinical Research Lecture Award, Society of Surgical Oncology (2016)
- XXVIII Catalonia International Prize (2016)
- European Society for Medical Oncology Lifetime Achievement Award (2017)

== See also ==
- Cancer (2015 PBS film)
