= Raymond DuBois =

Raymond DuBois may refer to:

- Raymond F. DuBois (born 1947), American national security official
- Raymond DuBois (academic), American medical research academic
- Raymond Dubois (c. 1932–1989), of the Dubois brothers, a French-Canadian organized crime group
