= Maximilian Diehn =

American radiation oncologist and cancer biologist

- Known for: Research on circulating tumor DNA (ctDNA), lung cancer genomics

Academic background
- Education: Stanford University (MD, PhD)

Academic work
- Institutions: Stanford University School of Medicine
- Website: med.stanford.edu/profiles/maximilian-diehn

Maximilian Diehn is an American radiation oncologist and cancer biologist. He is a Professor and Division Chief of Radiation and Cancer Biology in the Department of Radiation Oncology, and Vice Chair of Research in the Department of Radiation Oncology at the Stanford University School of Medicine. Diehn also co-leads the Cancer Biology Program at the Stanford Cancer Institute and holds the Jack, Lulu, and Sam Willson Professorship. He is known for his research in cancer genomics and the development of circulating tumor DNA (ctDNA) as a biomarker for cancer detection and monitoring, particularly in lung cancer. He is also the co-founder of Foresight Diagnostics.

== Education ==
Diehn received his Bachelor of Science degree in Biochemical Sciences from Harvard University. He earned both his MD and PhD in Biophysics from Stanford University. He completed his residency in Radiation Oncology at Stanford, where he also served as chief resident.

== Career and research ==
Diehn joined the faculty at Stanford University in 2010. His research program focuses on developing novel methods for detecting and treating cancer. A major area of his work involves the use of circulating tumor DNA (ctDNA) as a non-invasive biomarker. His laboratory has developed techniques for detecting and analyzing ctDNA, which can be used for early cancer detection, monitoring treatment response, and identifying minimal residual disease (MRD) after therapy. This work has been particularly influential in the context of lung cancer and other solid tumors. He has a h-index of 93 and has been cited over 90,000 times.

In 2021, Diehn co-founded Foresight Diagnostics, a company focused on developing ctDNA-based tests for cancer detection and monitoring, based on technology developed in his lab. He is also a Scientific Editor for Cancer Discovery and serves on the Thoracic Malignancies Steering Committee of the NCI.

== Honors and awards ==
- Member of the National Academy of Medicine (2021)
- Member of the American Society for Clinical Investigation
- NIH Director's New Innovator Award (2013)
- V Foundation Scholar Award
- Doris Duke Clinical Scientist Development Award
