= Postgaardi =

Scientific classification
- Domain: Eukaryota
- Clade: Discoba
- Phylum: Euglenozoa
- Class: Symbiontida
- Order: Postgaardida
- Family: Postgaardidae; Cavalier-Smith, 2016
- Genus: Postgaardi; Fenchel et al., 1995
- Species: P. mariagerensis

Binomial name
- Postgaardi mariagerensis Fenchel et al., 1995

Genus of protozoans

Postgaardi mariagerensis is a species of single-celled eukaryote in the Euglenozoa. Some have classified it in a class called Postgaardea along with Calkinsia, but as of 2009, Postgaardi is not well enough known to confidently determine its relationship with other organisms in the Euglenozoa. Both it and Calkinsia do live in low oxygen environments and are covered with bacteria which live on their surface.
