= Philip Greenberg =

American professor of medicine

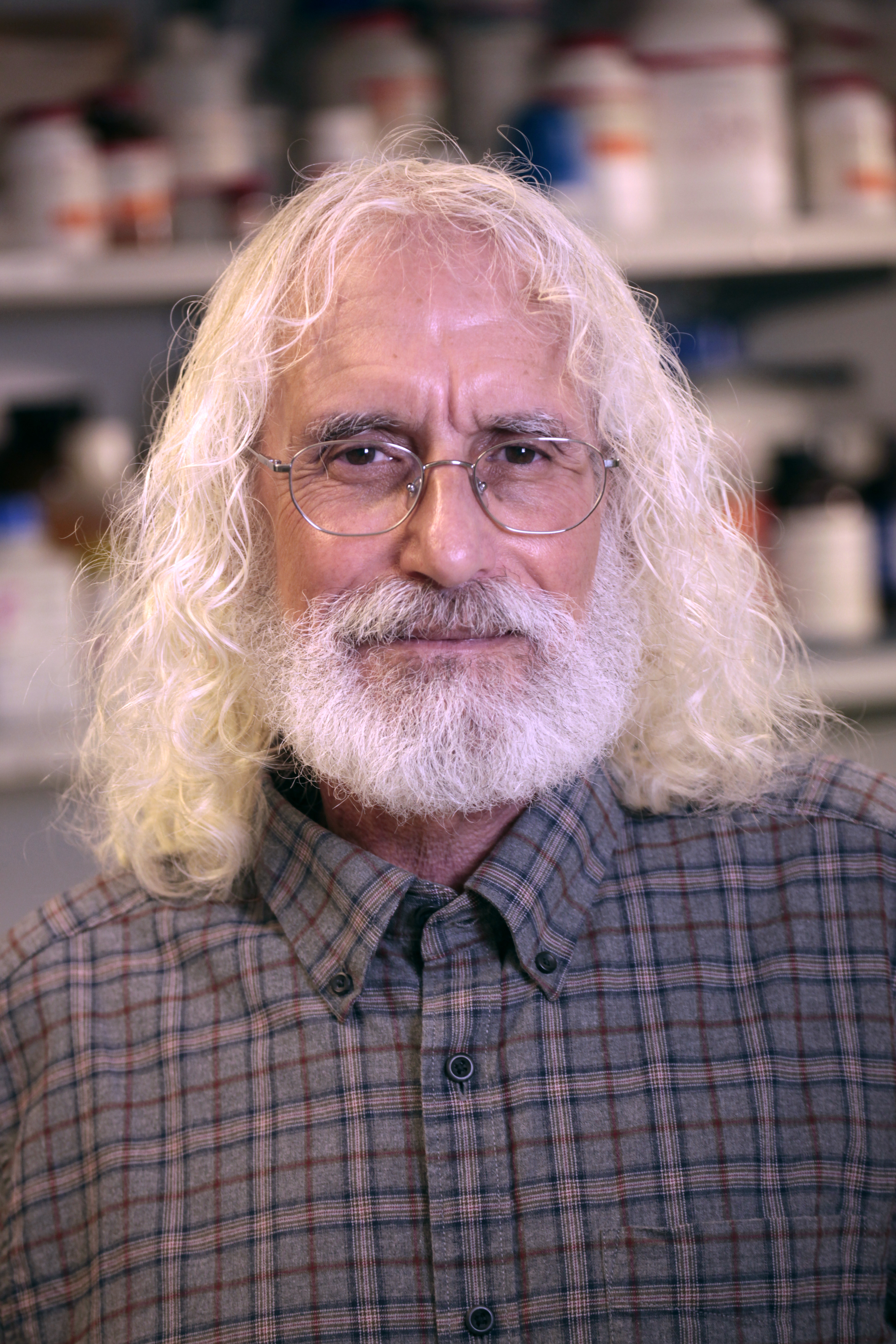
- Greenberg in 2025
- Education: Washington University in St. Louis; SUNY Downstate Medical Center
- Known for: T cell receptor T cell therapy
- Scientific career
- Fields: Hematology
- Workplaces: University of Washington; Fred Hutchinson Cancer Center
- Website: Fred Hutch page

Philip Greenberg is a professor of medicine, oncology, and immunology at the University of Washington and head of program in immunology at the Fred Hutchinson Cancer Research Center. His research is centered around T cell biology and therapeutic cell therapies. He is a co-founder of Juno Therapeutics.

== Education and research ==
Greenberg graduated from Washington University in St. Louis with a degree in biology; he received his M.D. in 1971 from SUNY Downstate Medical Center. After completing postdoctoral training at the University of California at San Diego, he joined the Fred Hutchinson Cancer Center and the Division of Oncology at the University of Washington, in 1976. His research is focused on T cell adoptive immunotherapy. His group has demonstrated the potential of isolating antigen-specific T cells and growing them to perform in vivo activity against a disease. He has also done work on re-engineering T cells to produce TCR-T that will work for non-leukemia malignancies.

== Awards and honors ==
- 1978–1981 American Cancer Society Junior Clinical Faculty Fellowship
- 1987 elected member, American Society for Clinical Investigation
- 1991–1998; 1998–2007 National Institutes of Health MERIT Award(s)
- 1998 elected member, Association of American Physicians
- 2007 elected Fellow, American Association for the Advancement of Science
- 2008 elected Fellow, American College of Physicians
- 2011 William B. Coley Award for Distinguished Research in Basic and Tumor Immunology, Cancer Research Institute
- 2015–present editor-in-chief, Cancer Immunology Research, AACR
- 2016–present selected as investigator of the Parker Institute for Cancer Immunotherapy
- 2017–2020 elected to board of directors, AACR
- 2018 awarded SITC's highest honor, the Richard V. Smalley, M.D., Memorial Award and Lectureship
- 2018 Gold Award for Achievement in Medical Research, Seattle Business Magazine
- 2019 E. Donnall Thomas Lecture and Prize, American Society of Hematology
- 2019 elected a Fellow of the AACR Academy
- 2019 elected a Distinguished Fellow of the American Association of Immunologists
- 2020 Precision Medicine World Conference Luminary Award
- 2021 elected Society for Immunotherapy of Cancer Inaugural Class of Fellows of the Academy of Immuno-Oncology
- 2023 elected president of the AACR for 2023–2024
- 2023 elected member of the National Academy of Sciences
- 2024 member of the Scientific Advisory Board of Break Through Cancer
