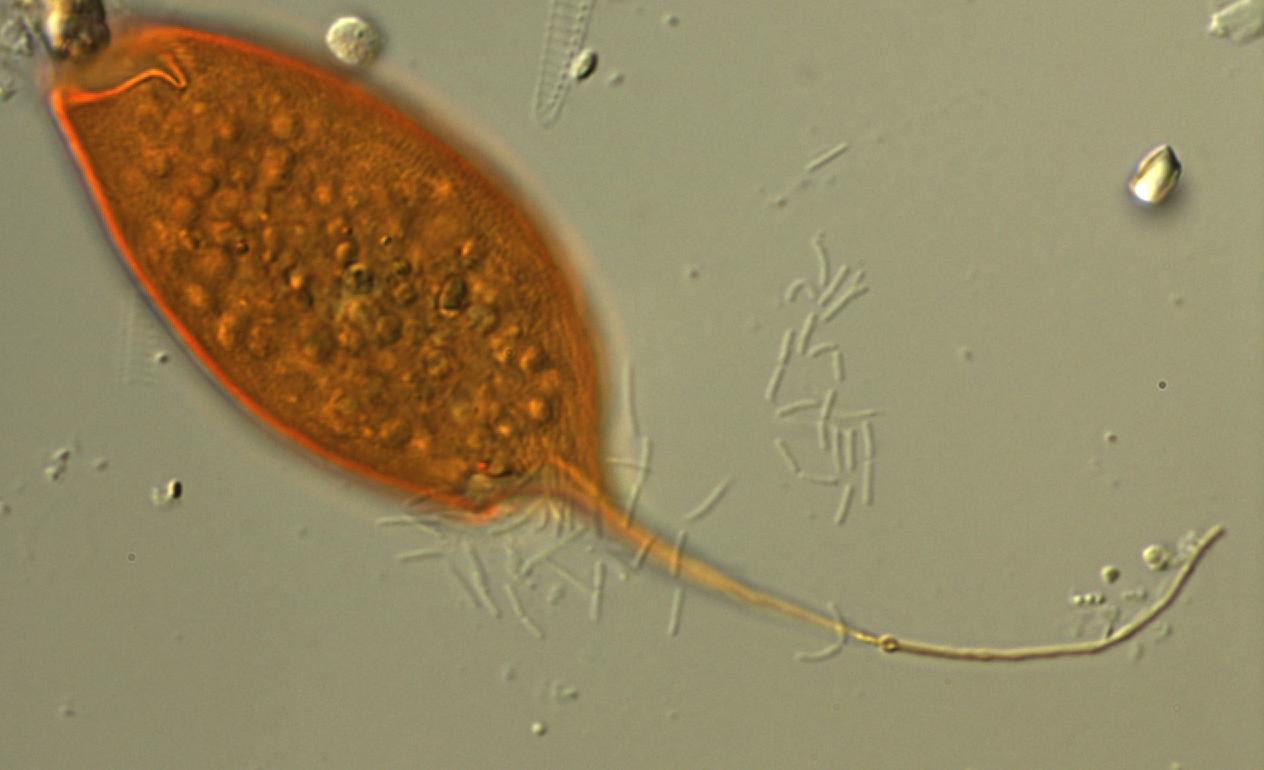
- Calkinsia aurea

Scientific classification
- Domain: Eukaryota
- Clade: Discoba
- Phylum: Euglenozoa
- Class: Symbiontida; Yubuki et al., 2009

Families
- Postgaardida; Postgaardidae; Calkinsiidae; Bihospitida; Bihospitidae

Synonyms
- Postgaardia Cavalier-Smith, 2016; Postgaardea Cavalier-Smith, 1998 s.s.

= Symbiontida =

Class of flagellates

Symbiontida is a basal class of flagellate Euglenozoa. As euglenozoans may be basal eukaryotes, the Symbiontida may be key to studying the evolution of eukaryotes, including the incorporation of eukaryotic traits such as the incorporation of alphaproteobacterial mitochondrial endosymbionts.

Euglenozoa are a large group of flagellate Discoba. They include a variety of common free-living species, as well as a few important parasites, some of which infect humans. Euglenozoa are represented by four major classes, i.e., Kinetoplastea, Diplonemea, Euglenida, and Symbiontida. Euglenozoa are unicellular, mostly around 15–40 μm (0.00059–0.00157 in) in size, although some euglenids get up to 500 μm (0.020 in) long.

== Characteristics ==
Euglenozoa are characterized by the ultrastructure of the flagella. In addition to the normal supporting microtubules or axoneme, each contains a rod (called paraxonemal), which has a tubular structure in one flagellum and a latticed structure in the other. Based on this, two smaller groups are included: the diplonemids and Postgaardi.

Symbiontida is a third deep-branching euglenozoan clade that may be a sister to Euglenoida but does not branch within them or Glycomonada on the evolutionary most realistic sequence trees presented in the next three sections, contrary to some poorly resolved earlier trees. They were placed in the new subphylum Postgaardia as class Postgaardea because they are radically different ultrastructurally from both euglenoids and glycomonads.

Symbiontida are biciliate free-living anaerobes covered in epibiotic bacteria in longitudinal rows are the diagnosis. A highly contractile pellicle with multiple evenly spaced microtubules and no morphogenetic pairs that are specifically distinguished. Without cytostomal or reservoir encircling fibers, cemented jaw supports, or hard longitudinal straight cemented rods, the cytopharynx is simplified. Symbiontida is the lone included class in etymology.

Reconstructions of FA ultrastructure in Postgaardi and Calkinsia confirmed that they were fundamentally similar and deserved to be classified together as a distinct order Postgaardida, as both genera share six finger-like projections.

== Taxonomy ==
According to Cavalier-Smith (2016):

- Subphylum Postgaardia Cavalier-Smith 2016
  - Class Postgaardea Cavalier-Smith 1998 s.s. [Symbiontida Yubuki et al., 2009]
    - Order Bihospitida Cavalier-Smith 2016
      - Family Bihospitidae Cavalier-Smith 2016
    - Order Postgaardida Cavalier-Smith 2003
      - Family Calkinsiidae Cavalier-Smith 2016
      - Family Postgaardidae Cavalier-Smith 2016

According to Kostygov et al. (2023):

- Class Symbiontida Yubuki, Edgcomb, Bernhard & Leander 2009
  - Bihospites Breglia, Yubuki, Hoppenrath & Leander 2010
  - Calkinsia Lackey 1960
  - Postgaardi Fenschel, Bernard, Esteban, Findlay, Hansen & Iversen 1995
