= Gary Nathan Calkins =

American protozoologist

- Born: January 18, 1869; Valparaiso, Indiana
- Died: January 4, 1943 (aged 72); Scarsdale, New York
- Education: Massachusetts Institute of Technology (BS); Columbia University (PhD)
- Known for: Description of protozoan conjugation
- Awards: National Academy of Sciences
- Scientific career
- Fields: Protozoology
- Workplaces: Columbia University

Gary Nathan Calkins (18 January 1869 – 4 January 1943) was an American protozoologist and a professor at Columbia University. He wrote several landmark textbooks on the biology of the protozoa. He described conjugation in Paramoecium and in his taxonomic approach separated chlorophyll containing flagellates from other protists.

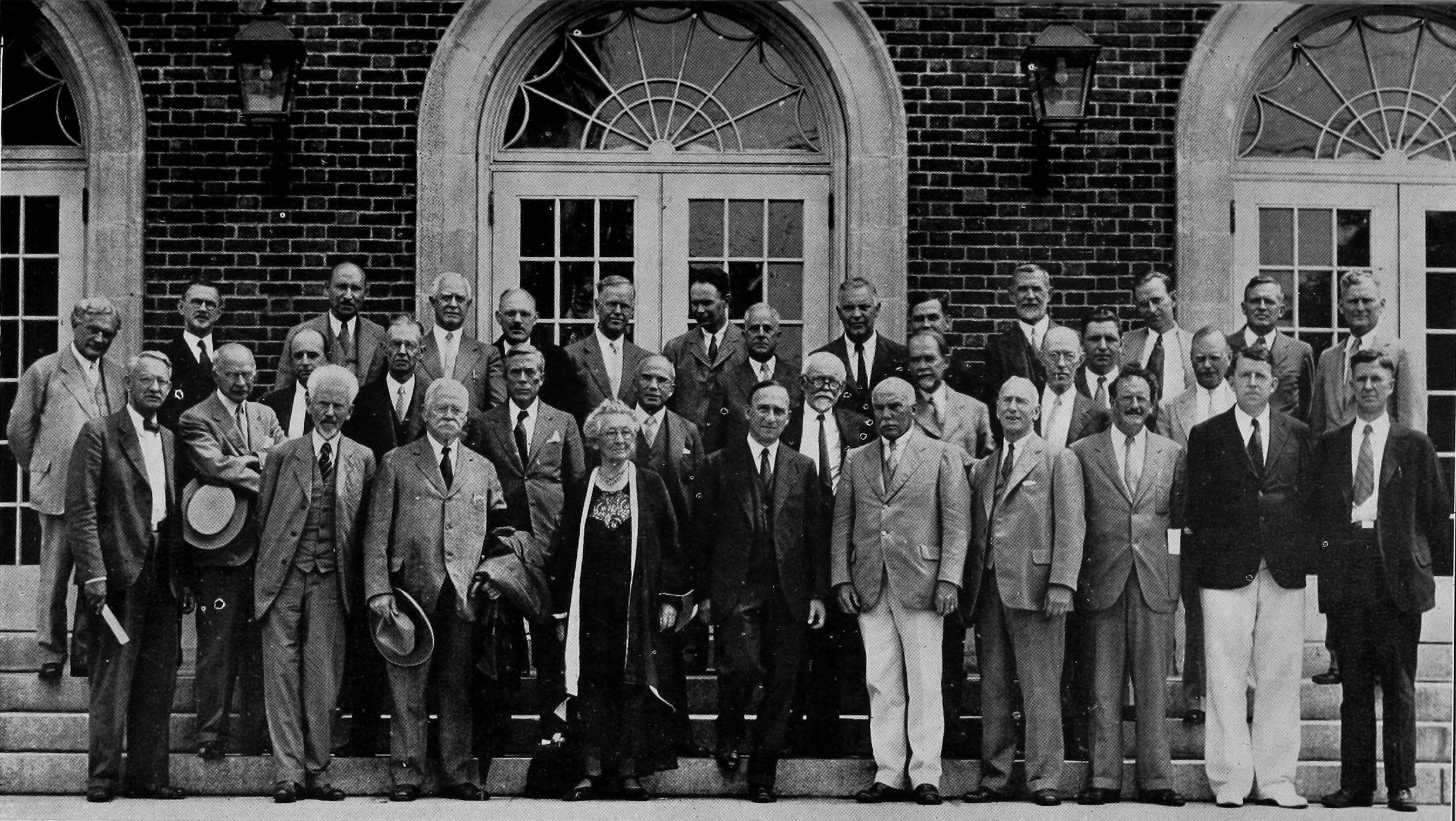
Calkins, front row, fourth from right at Woods Hole, 1934

== Early life and education ==
Calkins was born in Valparaiso, Indiana to John Wesley Calkins and Emma Frisbie Smith He graduated from Massachusetts Institute of Technology in 1890 and taught for a while. He worked briefly at the Marine Biological Laboratory, Woods Hole, and then continued further studies at Columbia University and obtained a Ph.D. in 1898. His influences at Columbia included Henry Fairfield Osborn.

== Career ==
He rose to professor of zoology at Columbia University in 1904 which was later renamed as professor of protozoology. He worked at Columbia University for most of his life retiring as an emeritus professor in 1939. He also took an interest in statistics and worked as a consultant in cancer research with the New York State Department of Health from 1902 to 1908. His major books were The Protozoa (1901) and The Biology of the Protozoa (1926). One of his most important works was in the study of protistan life-histories and the description of conjugation.

Calkins was president of the American Association for Cancer Research in 1913-1914. He was elected to the United States National Academy of Sciences in 1919 and the American Philosophical Society in 1920.

He is honoured in the name of Calkinsia which is a monotypic genus of excavates comprising the single species Calkinsia aureus.

== Personal life ==
Calkins married Helen Richards Colton in 1909. He died on January 4, 1943, leaving his wife, two sons, and a stepson
