= Jay Frank Schamberg =

American physician (1870–1934)

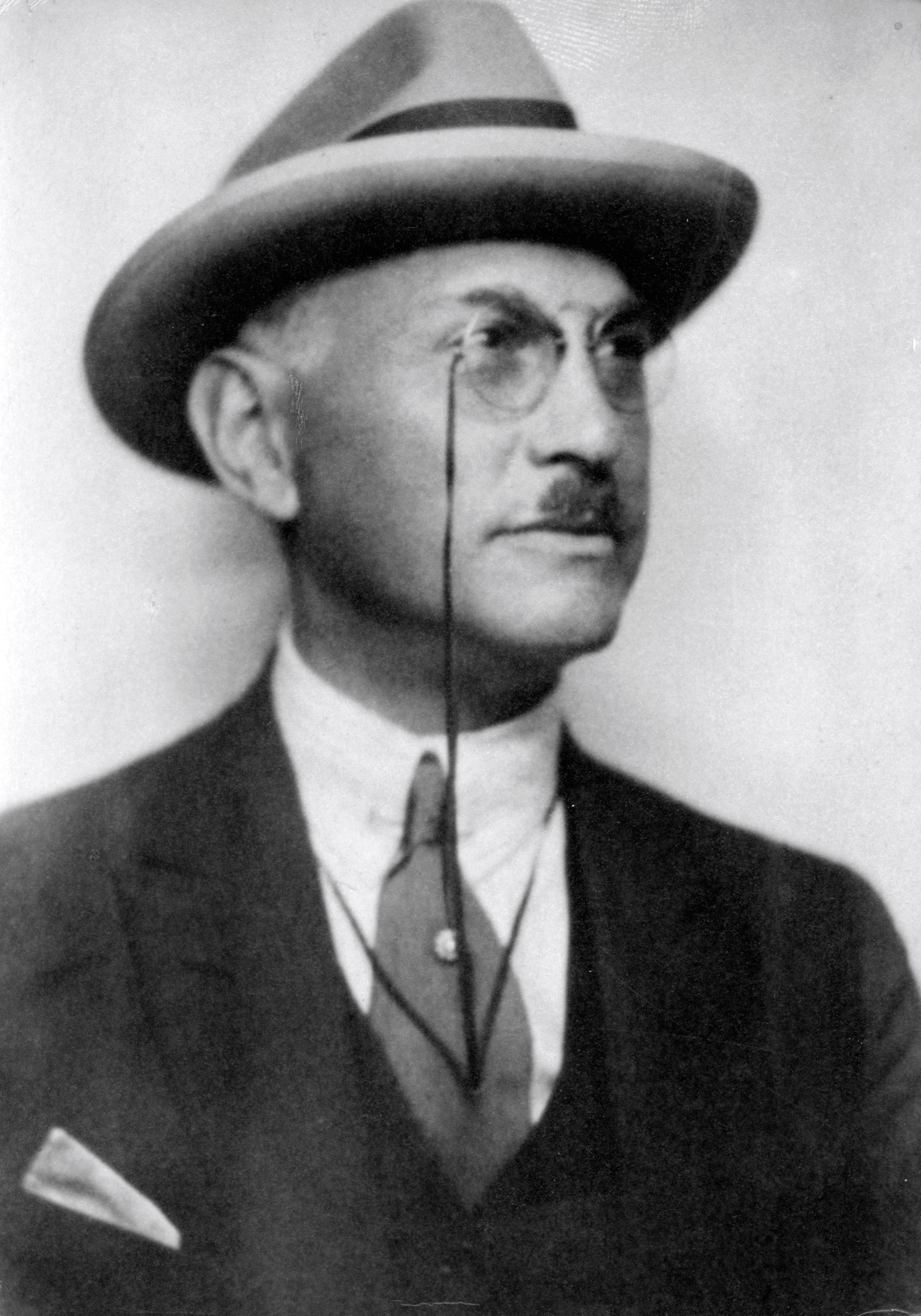
- J.F. Schamberg in 1906
- Born: November 6, 1870; Philadelphia, Pennsylvania
- Died: March 30, 1934 (aged 63); Philadelphia, Pennsylvania
- Education: University of Pennsylvania
- Known for: Schamberg Disease
- Scientific career
- Fields: Dermatology, Cancer research
- Workplaces: University of Pennsylvania; Temple University

Jay Frank Schamberg (November 6, 1870 – March 30, 1934) was a physician and prominent dermatologist/syphilogist in Philadelphia, PA during the first third of the twentieth century. He first became known as a strong advocate for smallpox vaccination prior to 1910. He had two diseases named for him, one of which continues to carry his eponym. During World War I, Schamberg's research laboratory successfully synthesized Salvarsan, the standard treatment for syphilis, which had previously only been available from Germany.

== Early life ==
Schamberg was born to Gustave Schamberg and Emma Frank Schamberg in Philadelphia on 6 November 1870. His father was born in Herleshausen in what is now the Hesse State in Germany and emigrated to the United States around 1848. He was a meat broker. Jay had 3 brothers (Lewis, Morrie and Herbert) and two sisters (Zella and Eta). Schamberg attended Central High School in Philadelphia and received his medical degree from the University of Pennsylvania in 1892.

== Professional work ==
In the first decade of the 20th Century two diseases carried Schamberg's name. Today only one does. In 1901, Schamberg described a new eruptive skin disorder, which was prevalent in the spring and fall. The condition recurred every year in and around Philadelphia, but its cause was unknown. Until 1910 the condition was known as Schamberg's Disease. In 1909, the disease struck the crew of a yacht in the Philadelphia harbor. Because of the prominence of the yacht's owner, Mr. P.A.B. Widener, Dr. Joseph Goldberger of the United States Public Health Service was sent to Philadelphia to work with Schamberg on ascertaining the cause of the eruption. Schamberg and Goldberger demonstrated that the eruption was caused by mites found in the straw of the crew members' bunks. Subsequently the eponymous designation of the disease was dropped and it was referred to as "straw mattress disease" or "grain itch". It was described by Schamberg as acaro-dermatitis urticarioides.

Also in 1901, Schamberg described a peculiar progressive pigmentary dermatosis caused by extravasation of blood from the capillaries in the skin. It is most common in the lower extremities, but its underlying etiology has not been firmly established. This condition continues to be called Schamberg's Disease.

== Salvarsan and World War I ==
Widener's generosity allowed Schamberg to start the Research Institute of Cutaneous Medicine in 1912. At the time of the outbreak of World War I, the only effective treatments for syphilis were based on arsphenamine which was called by its brand name, Salvarsan. The only source of the drug was from the German company Hoechst AG, which held the patent. Early in the war the Research Institute developed a process for the manufacture of arsphenamine. By early 1916, the supply of arsphenamine from Germany was virtually exhausted. As early as March, 1916 the Research Institute was supplying arsphenamine to all 48 states and to the military. In Nov of 1917, the FTC abrogated Hoechst's patent and licensed Schamberg's laboratory as the sole manufacturer in the United States. Following the war, Hoechst accused Schamberg and his associates of illegal patent infringement. Herman Metz represented Hoechst in this matter and a settlement was eventually reached. In March and April, 1922 the Senatorial Commission on Dye Stuffs heard testimony from Schamberg and Metz.

== Smallpox vaccination ==
Schamberg was a life-long champion of smallpox vaccination. In 1910, he authored an article in Ladies Home Journal entitled "What Has Vaccination Really Done". This was a rebuttal to an article by John Pitcairn representing the views of the Anti-Vaccination League of America. Eighteen years later, in 1928, George Bernard Shaw, who was a well known anti-vaccinationist, responded to the article in Ladies' Home Journal by impugning Schamberg's credentials and his assertion that vaccination saves lives. The tone of the letter is captured in its last sentence: "In short, my dear Doctor, your 4000 cases only prove that clinical experience is not enough, and that as to the rest of you (sic) are 100 years out of date."

Schamberg held Professorships in dermatology at the University of Pennsylvania, Jefferson Medical, and Temple University. He was president of the American Dermatologic Association in 1920-22, chairman of the AMA's Section Dermatology and Syphilology in 1928-29, President of the American Association for Cancer Research also in 1928-1929, and an editor of the Archives of Dermatology and Syphilology from 1927 to 1934.

== Personal life and death ==
Schamberg married May Ida Bamberger on October 11, 1905. They had two children, Elizabeth, mother of Pulitzer Prize-winning journalist J. Anthony Lukas, and Ira Leo, a longtime dermatologist in the Philadelphia area who died in 1980. Schamberg died of cardiovascular disease on March 30, 1934.

== Selected publications ==
- Vaccination and Its Relation to Animal Experimentation (1911)
- Smallpox and Vaccination (1914)
