= Lillian Siu =

Canadian oncologist and physician-scientist

- Education: University of Toronto
- Scientific career
- Fields: Oncology
- Workplaces: University of Toronto; Princess Margaret Cancer Centre

Lillian Lai Yun Siu is a Canadian oncologist and physician-scientist who researches anticancer drug development. She is a professor of medicine at the University of Toronto and a senior medical oncologist at the Princess Margaret Cancer Centre.

== Life ==
Siu earned a M.D. from the University of Toronto Faculty of Medicine. She completed an oncopharmacology fellowship at the Princess Margaret Cancer Centre and a clinical research fellowship in new drug development at the University of Texas Health Science Center at San Antonio.

Siu researches anticancer drug development. She has served as a professor of medicine at the University of Toronto Faculty of Medicine since 2009 and a senior medical oncologist at the Princess Margaret Cancer Centre since 1998. Siu is an elected fellow of the American Society of Clinical Oncology (2015), Canadian Academy of Health Sciences (2023), and the American Association for Cancer Research (AACR). She has served on the Scientific Advisory Board of Break Through Cancer since 2023. She became the editor-in-chief of Cancer Research Communications in 2021. In 2024, Siu was selected as the president-elect of the AACR.
