= Willy Meyer (surgeon) =

German-American thoracic surgeon (1858-1932)

- Born: July 24, 1858; Minden, Westphalia
- Died: February 25, 1932 (aged 73); New York, New York
- Education: University of Bonn
- Known for: Innovations in thoracic surgery
- Scientific career
- Fields: Surgery
- Workplaces: Lenox Hill Hospital; New York Post-Graduate Medical School

Willy Meyer (1858–1932) was a German-born American surgeon who was a key figure in the development of thoracic surgery. He was the principal founder of the American Association for Thoracic Surgery (AATS) and served as its second president.

== Early life and education ==
Born in Minden, Westphalia, Meyer was encouraged to study medicine by the physician Abraham Jacobi. After completing military service, Meyer earned his medical degree from the University of Bonn in 1880. He then served as an army surgeon before working for three years as a clinical assistant to the surgeon Friedrich Trendelenburg in Bonn.

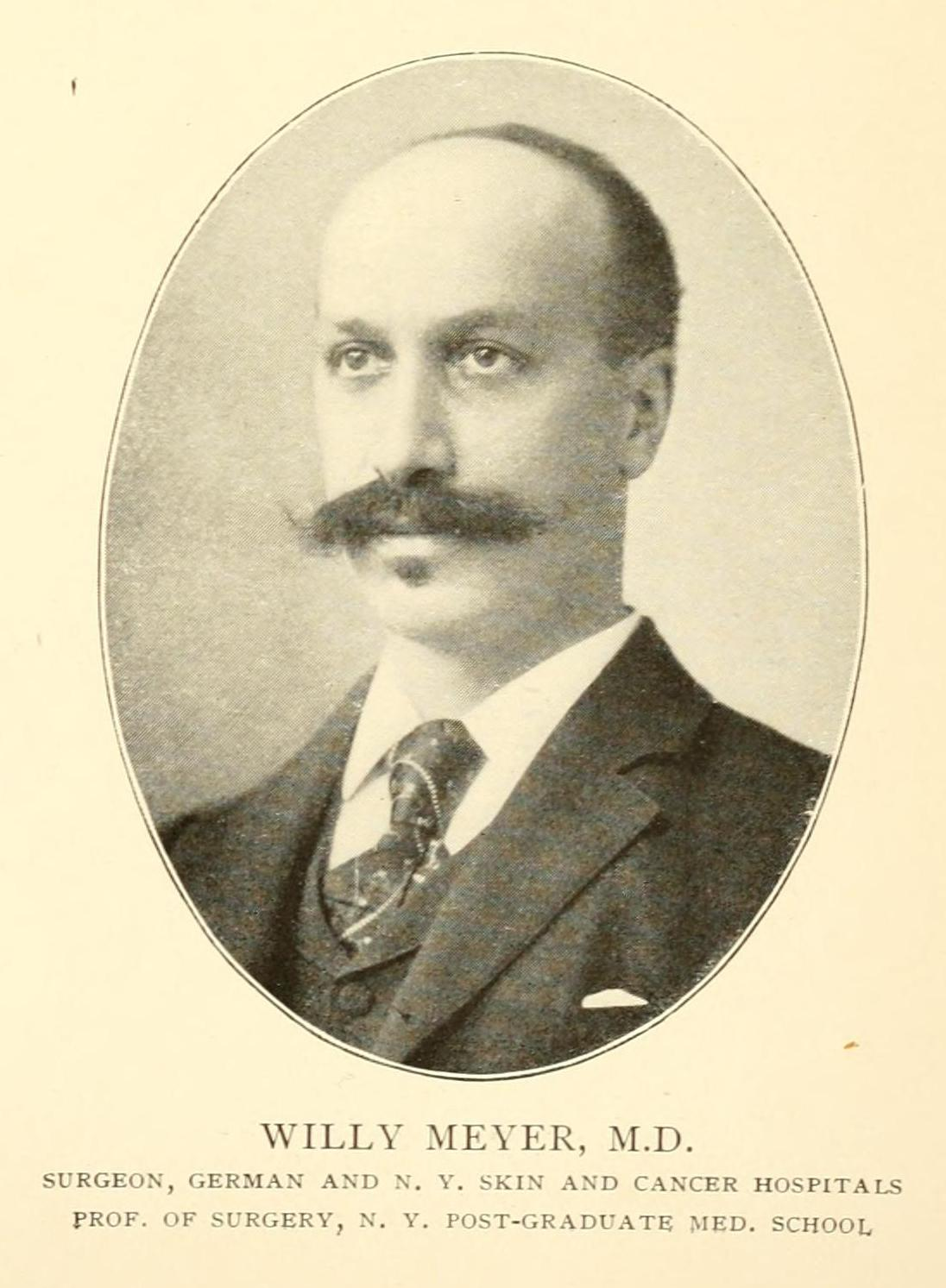
Willy Meyer, circa 1890s, during his early surgical career in New York.

== Career ==
In 1884, Meyer emigrated to New York and established a surgical practice. Within two years, he joined the staff of the German Hospital (later renamed Lenox Hill Hospital), and later became attending surgeon and professor of surgery at the New York Post-Graduate Medical School. In general surgery, he is credited with introducing cystoscopy, ureteral catheterization, staged prostatectomy, and a method for radical mastectomy in the United States.

Meyer also made important contributions to the development of cancer surgery and the study of malignancy. In 1894, he independently described a radical mastectomy procedure for breast cancer, around the same time as William Stewart Halsted. The operation involved removal of the breast, underlying pectoral muscles, and axillary lymph nodes, and became an important surgical approach to breast cancer in the early twentieth century. He later served as president of the American Association for Cancer Research in 1922-1923. Later, in 1931, he published a book entitled "Cancer: Its origin, its development and its self-perpetuation", in which he formulated a systemic conception of malignancy.

Meyer' primary focus later became thoracic surgery. His interest in the field began in 1904 after he observed Ernst Ferdinand Sauerbruch perform a procedure within a negative-pressure chamber. This led Meyer to participate in the debate on the use of negative versus positive pressure for open-chest surgery. He later worked with engineers to construct a "universal differential pressure chamber" for experimental use.

Meyer initiated the formation of a specialized surgical society after a 1913 presentation on the resection of the thoracic esophagus by his colleague, Franz Torek, received no discussion at a meeting of the American Medical Association.

On February 20, 1917, Meyer formed The New York Association for Thoracic Surgery with a group of colleagues. This group then organized a national meeting on June 7, 1917, where the American Association for Thoracic Surgery was officially established. Samuel Meltzer was elected its first president, and Meyer succeeded him, serving two terms.

== Death ==
Willy Meyer died of a heart attack on February 25, 1932, at age 73 while attending a meeting of the New York Surgical Society at the New York Academy of Medicine Building in Manhattan. Despite efforts to revive him, he lost consciousness and died within minutes. At the time of his death, he was chief consulting surgeon at Lenox Hill Hospital.
