= James B. Greenough =

American classical scholar (1833–1901)

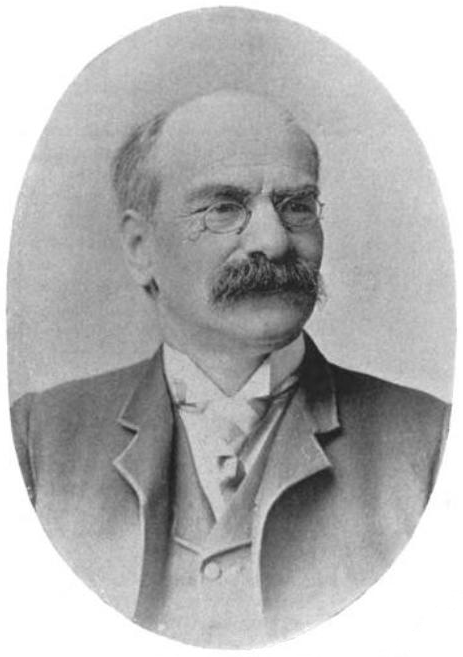
- Born: James Bradstreet Greenough; May 4, 1833; Portland, Maine
- Died: October 11, 1901 (aged 68); Cambridge, Massachusetts
- Education: Harvard Law School
- Occupation(s): Lawyer, classical scholar
- Spouses: Mary Battey Ketchum (m. 1860; died 1893) Harriet Sweetzer Jenks (m. 1895)

James Bradstreet Greenough (May 4, 1833 – October 11, 1901) was an American classical scholar.

== Life ==
James B. Greenough was born in Portland, Maine on May 4, 1833. He graduated at Harvard in 1856, studied one year at the Harvard Law School, was admitted to the Michigan bar and practised in Marshall, Michigan, until 1865, when he was appointed tutor in Latin at Harvard. In 1873 he became assistant professor.

He advocated for the admission of women to Harvard, and in 1882 became a director of the society which later founded Radcliffe College.

He married Mary Battey Ketchum in 1860. She died in 1893, and he remarried to Harriet Sweetzer Jenks two years later.

In 1883 he became a professor of Latin, a post which he resigned hardly six weeks before his death at his home in Cambridge, Massachusetts on October 11, 1901.

He was survived by two sons; surgeon and cancer specialist Dr. Robert B. Greenough and James Jay Greenough of Noble and Greenough School.

== Works ==
Following the lead of Goodwin's Moods and Tenses (1860), he set himself to study Latin historical syntax, and in 1870 published Analysis of the Latin Subjunctive, a brief treatise, privately printed, and in many ways coinciding with Berthold Delbrück's Gebrauch des Conjunctivs und Optativs in Sanskrit und Griechischen (1871), which, however, quite overshadowed the Analysis.

In 1872 appeared A Latin Grammar for Schools and Colleges, founded on Comparative Grammar, by Joseph H. Allen and James B. Greenough, a work done with great critical care with Joseph Henry Allen. His theory of cum-constructions is that adopted and developed by William Gardner Hale. In 1872-1880 Greenough offered the first courses in Sanskrit and comparative philology given at Harvard.

His able scholarship was evident in his editing of the Allen and Greenough Latin Series of text-books. Also, he occasionally contributed to Harvard Studies in Classical Philology (founded in 1889 and endowed at his instance by his own class) papers on Latin syntax, prosody and etymology — a subject on which he planned a long work on Roman archaeology and on Greek religion at the time of the New Comedy.

He assisted in the founding of Radcliffe College. An able English scholar and an excellent etymologist, he collaborated with Professor George L Kittredge on Words and their Ways in English Speech (1901).

=== Light verse ===
- The Blackbirds, a comedietta, first published in The Atlantic Monthly (vol. xxxix. 1877);
- The Rose and the Ring (1880), a pantomime adapted from William Makepeace Thackeray;
- The Queen of Hearts (1885), a dramatic fantasia;
- Old King Cole (1889), an operetta.

=== Other publications ===
- Selections from the Poems of Ovid (1882)
- Select Orations of Cicero (1886)
