= Schamberg disease =

Schamberg's disease
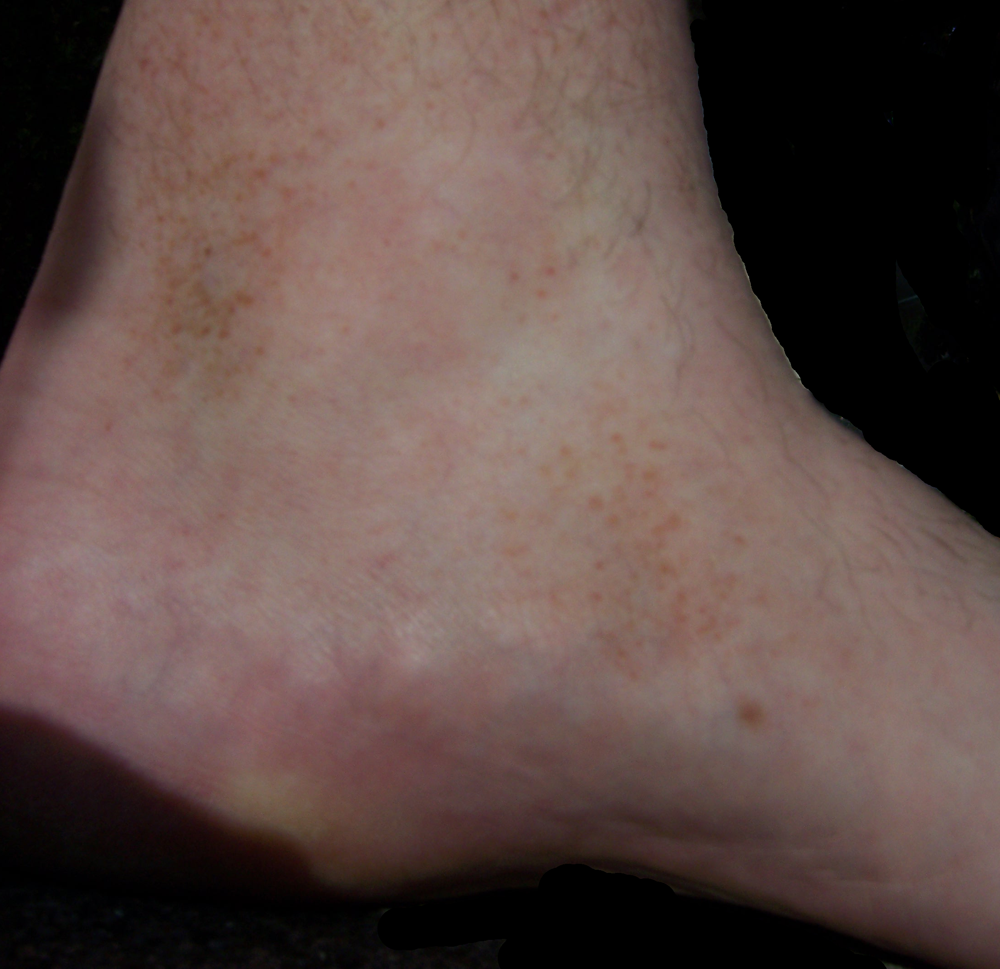
- Rust-colored spots typical of Schamberg disease on the lower left leg and left foot of a 26-year-old Caucasian male.
- Specialty: Dermatology

Schamberg's disease, (also known as "progressive pigmentary dermatosis of Schamberg", "purpura pigmentosa progressiva" (PPP), and "Schamberg's purpura") is a chronic discoloration of the skin found in people of all ages, usually only affecting the feet, legs or thighs or a combination. It may occur as a single event or subsequent bouts may cause further spread. It is most common in males. It is named after Jay Frank Schamberg, who described it in 1901. There is no known cure for this disease but it is not a life-threatening condition and is mainly of cosmetic concern, although, because it can appear so suddenly, so extensively and because it usually leaves permanent discoloration of the skin, it can cause understandable psychological concern. The skin lesions sometimes cause itching, which can be treated by applying cortisone cream. The cortisone cream will only help with the itching and does not improve the discoloration of the skin. Schamberg's disease causes no other symptoms beside skin discoloration and itching. The condition is caused by inflammation of capillaries near the surface of skin and subsequent leaking of red blood cells into surrounding tissues. As the red blood cells break down and get mostly resorbed, some of the iron released by the red blood cells remains in the skin and causes the characteristic rust-colored appearance. The cause of the capillary inflammation is usually unknown.

== Symptoms ==
The lesions are most frequent on the lower limbs, but may occur anywhere on the body, including the hands, arms, torso and even the neck. They may vary in number and erupt in mass numbers. They consist of irregular patches of orange or brown pigmentation with characteristic "cayenne pepper" spots appearing within and at the edge of old lesions. There are usually no symptoms, although there may be some slight itching, but there is no pain. The eruption may persist for many years. The pattern of the eruption changes, with slow extension and often some clearing of the original lesions.

Schamberg's disease, or progressive pigmented purpuric dermatosis, is a chronic discoloration of the skin which usually affects the legs and often spreads slowly. This disease is more common in males and may occur at any age from childhood onward. This condition is observed worldwide and has nothing to do with race or ethnic background.

== Causes ==
Schamberg's disease is caused by leaky blood vessels near the surface of the skin, capillaries, which allow red blood cells to slip through into the skin. The red blood cells in the skin then fall apart and release their iron, which is released from hemoglobin. The iron causes a rust color and this accounts for the orange tint of the rash. Although the underlying cause for the leaky blood vessels is almost always unknown, researchers suggest some potential triggers. These include the body's inflammatory reaction to some agent, such as a viral infection or a prescription or over the counter medication or supplement, such as thiamine and aspirin. Even though there is no correlation with genetics, there have been a few cases where few people in a family had this condition.

== Mechanism ==
Schamberg's disease is a skin disorder that causes a discoloration of the lower extremities. It usually occurs in the lower extremities and rarely elsewhere. This condition is caused by leaky blood vessels near the surface of the skin. The cause of the leaky capillaries is usually not known. When the red blood cells escape the blood vessels, they end up close under the skin surface, where they break apart, releasing hemoglobin, which in turn breaks apart, releasing Iron. (Iron is the part of hemoglobin that enables it to transfer oxygen from the lungs to the cells and carbon dioxide from the cells to the lungs.) The iron released into the skin gets bound up into a complex called hemosiderin, which causes the discoloration of the skin.

== Diagnosis ==
With a complete history, the results from visual examination, and the aid of appropriate laboratory testing, a dermatologist can usually determine whether the skin lesions are in fact due to Schamberg's disease.

Schamberg's disease can only be properly diagnosed by a healthcare provider. For a trained skin specialist such as a dermatologist, the condition is often readily diagnosed, because the visual appearance of the lesions on the skin itself usually suggests the possibility that the cause may be Schamberg's disease. While reviewing medical history is important to diagnose this condition, it is essential that the skin be physically examined.

To ensure that the skin lesions are not caused by other skin conditions or infections, a doctor will often order a complete blood count (CBC) and other blood tests. Blood test results are usually normal. They are performed primarily to rule out other bleeding disorders that cause purpura. Since Schamberg's disease is usually asymptomatic beyond the visible lesions themselves, few other tests are usually indicated.

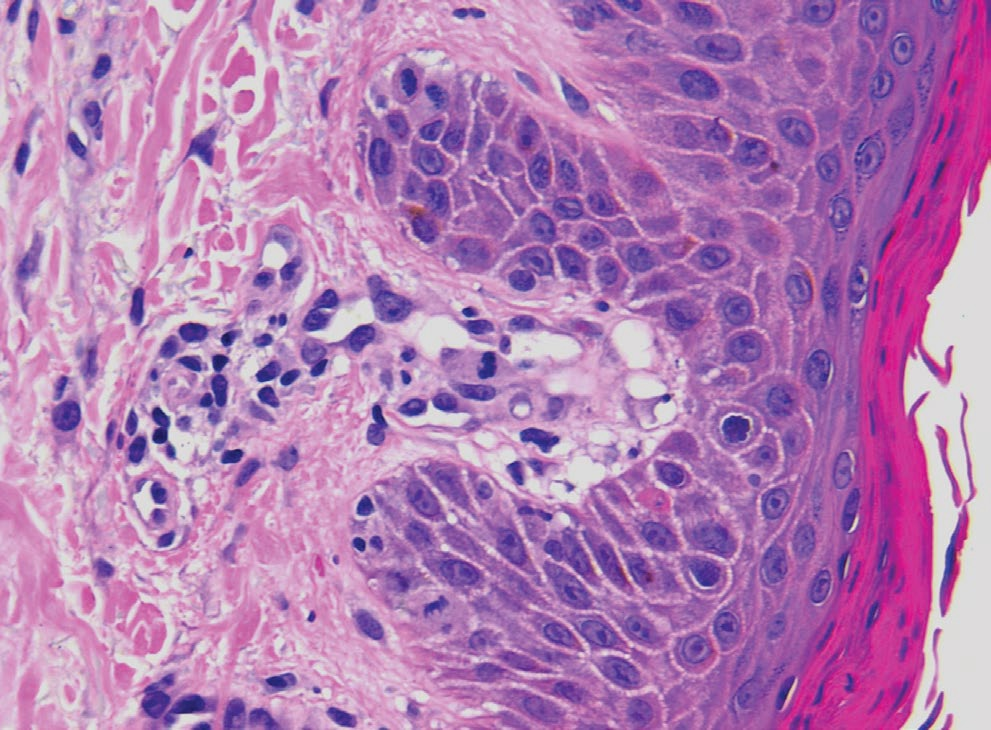
Micrograph of Schamberg disease, suggesting the spongiotic stage of a purpuric dermatitis.

Additional testing may aid diagnosis. A skin biopsy may be taken to determine capillaritis of dermal vessels. Capillaritis or pigmented purpura is skin condition that has brown-reddish patches on the skin, which is caused by leaky capillaries. Such skin biopsies are sent to a laboratory for a pathological examination, where each biopsy is observed under a microscope. A dermatologist may also perform a dermatoscopy.

== Treatment ==
There is no cure for Schamberg's disease, however, this condition is not life-threatening or a major health concern. The most usual problems that patients will encounter is discoloration of the skin and, occasionally, itching. Itching may be improved by applying a cortisone cream. Rarely, in very severe or concerning cases, Colchicine treatment has been used to prevent recurrence. Some recommend that patients take a vitamin C supplement to promote collagen production, but this is not proven to be helpful. In cases where there is a known trigger, people should avoid re-exposure to that trigger, e.g., people suspected to be sensitive to food with artificial colors or preservatives should avoid foods containing those items. This is because some people have been observed to be sensitive to these agents, and the body initiates an inflammatory reaction if exposed to them again, which causes further capillary inflammation and red blood cell leakage. Several research studies have indicated that Schamberg's disease can be controlled and the number of lesions can be reduced with the use of a drug called aminaphtone. This drug helps reduce capillary fragility and red blood cell leakage.

A study published in 2014 on the Journal of the German Society of Dermatology (Deutsche Dermatologische Gesellschaft) concludes that oral rutoside and ascorbic acid may be an efficient and well tolerated treatment for PPPD, with a recommendation for early treatment for best clinical outcome.

Many topical and systemic therapies for Schamberg disease have been tried without consistent results. A case series published in 2012 describes the treatment of five patients with Schamberg's disease of the lower extremities using Advanced Fluorescence Technology (AFT) pulsed light with favorable results.

== Prognosis ==
A patient with Schamberg's disease can live a normal and healthy life. Since there is no proven cure for this condition, the patient will have to endure the lesions on their skin. With appropriate treatments, the condition may get better. Although the skin lesions are not life-threatening, it may cause a cosmetic concern for some individuals. Skin lesions may cause psychological discomfort, where patients may require reassurance to help with stress and anxiety. There are a few rare cases of T-cell lymphoma that have developed from Schamberg's disease. This is not a cause for concern, since the risk factors associated with Schamberg's disease are relatively low.

== Recent research ==
A few very small non-blinded studies of treatment with narrow-band ultraviolet light have been reported as promising.
