= Francis C. Wood =

American cancer researcher

Francis Carter Wood
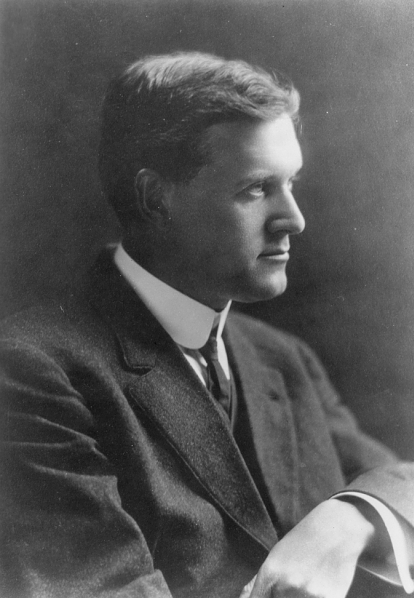
- Francis Carter Wood in 1910
- Born: December 30, 1869; Columbus, Ohio
- Died: January 5, 1951 (aged 81); Englewood, New Jersey
- Education: Ohio State University; Columbia University
- Known for: Use of X-rays and radium in cancer therapy
- Scientific career
- Fields: Cancer research, pathology
- Institutions: Columbia University; St. Luke's Hospital

Francis Carter Wood (December 30, 1869 – January 5, 1951) was an American cancer researcher, a pioneer in the use of X-rays and radium for treatment of cancer. Wood was the founder and the founding director of the Crocker Institute for Cancer Research.

He was also the founder of the pathology laboratory at St. Luke's Hospital, and its director from 1910 to 1948. Wood was also a professor of clinical pathology and the director of Institute of Cancer Research at Columbia University.

== Biography ==
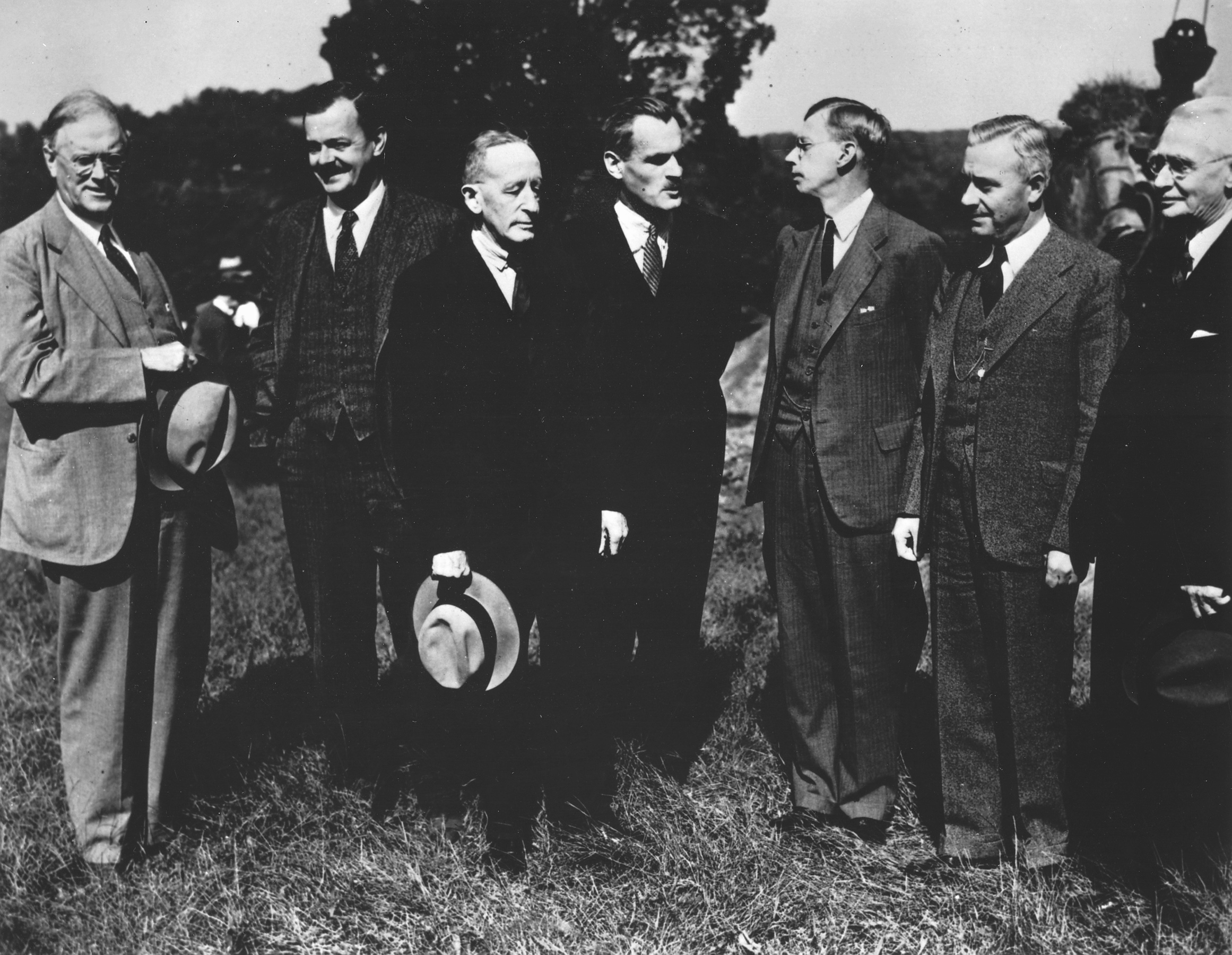
Wood (left) and other members of the first National Advisory Cancer Council at the groundbreaking ceremonies of the National Cancer Institute's building 6 in June 1938

Wood was born on December 30, 1869, in Columbus, Ohio, and graduated from the Ohio State University in 1891. He graduated from College of Physicians and Surgeons of Columbia University in 1894, and joined the faculty of clinical pathology at Columbia University in 1896. From 1906 to 1912 he served as director of clinical pathology at Columbia University and also served as the director of the pathology laboratory at St. Luke's Hospital (now Mount Sinai Morningside) from 1910 to 1948, founding it in 1910. He was president of the American Association for Cancer Research in 1917–1918, and again in 1931–1932.

== Accolades ==
Dr. Wilhelmina Dunning called Wood an "international authority on cancer and pioneer radiotherapist". The New York Times called him "internationally known cancer research specialist who was a pioneer in the use of X-rays and radium" and said that Wood "is credited with many basic discoveries in principles of radiation".

== Publications ==
- Chemical and Microscopical Diagnosis (1909)
- Cancer: Nature, Diagnosis, and Cure (1937)
