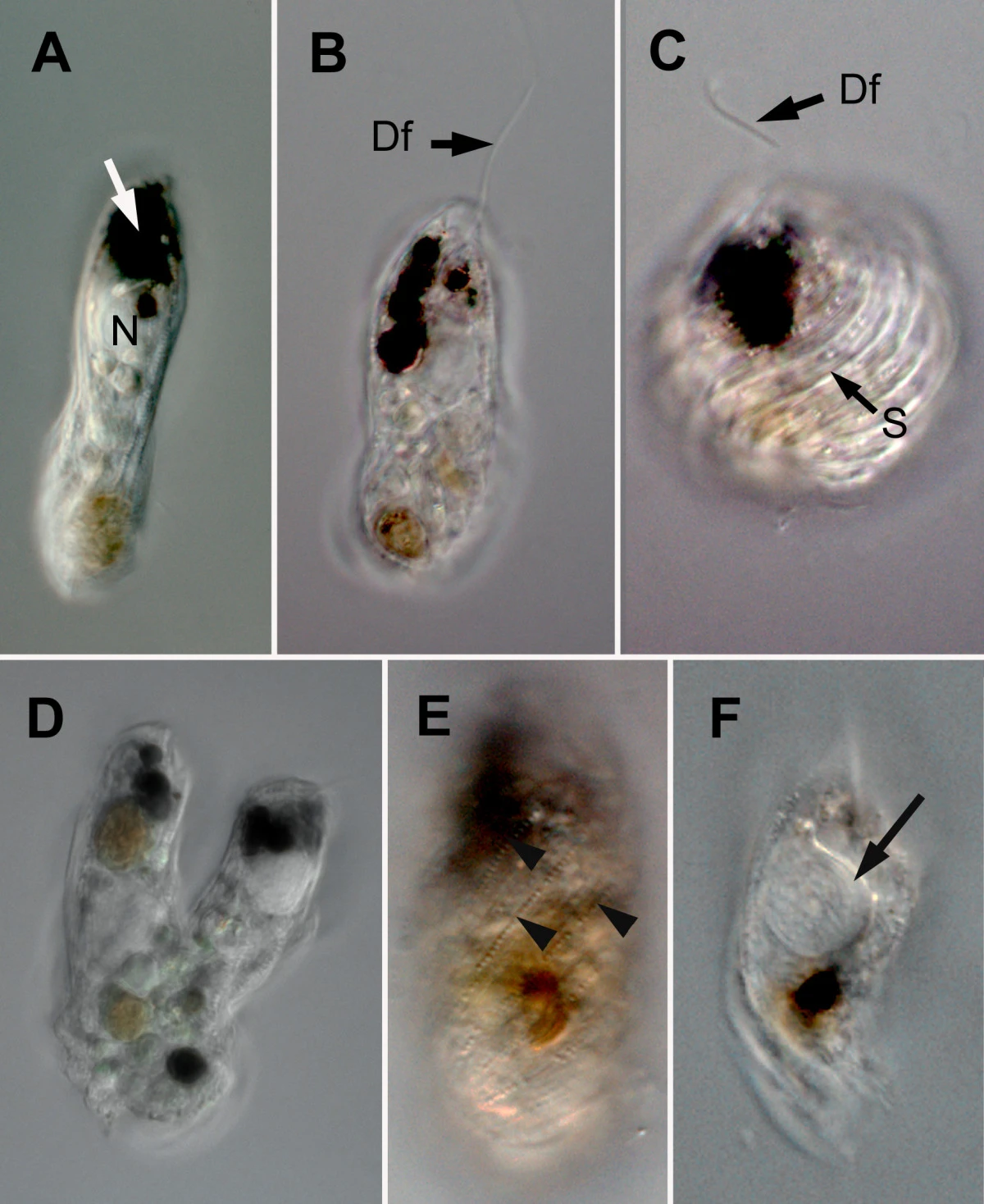

Scientific classification
- Domain: Eukaryota
- Clade: Discoba
- Phylum: Euglenozoa
- Class: Symbiontida
- Order: Bihospitida; Cavalier-Smith, 2016
- Family: Bihospitidae; Cavalier-Smith, 2016
- Genus: Bihospites; Breglia, Yubuki, Hoppenrath & Leander, 2010
- Species: B. bacati

Binomial name
- Bihospites bacati Breglia, Yubuki, Hoppenrath & Leander, 2010

= Bihospites =

Genus of protozoans

Bihospites is a genus of symbiontid euglenozoans characterized by the presence of two species of epibiotic bacteria on the cell surface. Bihospites cells are clear, biflagellated, and uninucleated, that range between 40 and 120 μm long and 15–30 μm wide. Bihospites, as well as other members of the symbiontids, are found in semi-anoxic to anoxic sediments in benthic marine environments. Each cell surface is covered by both rod-shaped and spherical-shaped epibiotic bacteria that may share a commensalistic or mutualistic relationship with Bihospites host cells. Bihospites cells are highly contractile and contain several morphological synapomorphies which are present in euglenozoans, however they also contain several unique morphological traits including a unique C-shaped feeding apparatus.

== Etymology ==
The name "Bihospites" refers to the two different types of episymbiotic bacteria associated with Bihospites cells as "Bihospites" means "with two guests" in Latin.

== History ==
The genus Bihospites was first described by Breglia et al. (2010) at the University of British Columbia. Currently, there is only one characterized species within this genus: Bihospites bacati, which belongs to a clade of euglenozoans known as Symbiontida. Symbiontida are characterized by their preference for anoxic environments as well as by their symbiotic interactions with bacteria. There are only two currently defined species supported through molecular phylogenetic analysis within the Symbiontida, indicating that it is a relatively poorly understood group of organisms. Euglenozoans that have a symbiotic relationship with epibiont bacteria have been reported in high abundance in semi-anoxic marine microbial mat communities, such as in Monterey Bay, California, however the exact species present were not confirmed. Many of these euglenozoans may be from the clade Symbiontida, however there has been limited research on this group to date. Given that Bihospites is one of the 3 genera within Symbiontida, which is an under-represented group in the current research, researchers lack a concrete understanding of Bihospites distribution, abundance and diversity. Since Symbiontida are typically found in oxygen depleted marine sediments, which can include deep sea sediments from greater than 500m in depth, it is possible that this group is simply understudied due to the difficulty of sampling in these habitats.

== Habitat and ecology ==
Currently, the only known species, Bihospites bacati, has been found in two locations: Centennial Beach, BC and in the Wadden Sea, Germany. It is found in low oxygen marine sand within tidal regions. Bihospites cell abundance is notably lower during the winter. Bihospites are notable because of their symbiotic relationship with both spherical and rod-shaped epibiotic bacteria that cover each cell. While the exact relationship between Bihospites and the epibionts is currently unknown, it is likely that they share either a commensalistic relationship, where the bacteria benefit from the metabolic byproducts of each Bihospites host, or a mutualistic relationship. By oxidizing sulfur and methane within the environment, it is possible that the bacteria are able to detoxify the environment for their Bihospites hosts. The main food source of Bihospites is unknown however Bihospites cells have a complex feeding apparatus and are highly contractile. They have been observed to undergo metabolic movement, which is a common characteristic among various euglenozoans and can allow cells to consume larger prey. Although Bihospites have never been observed to consume large, eukaryotic prey, these features indicate that it may be a predator of eukaryotic cells. It is possible that Bihospites cells consume the epibiotic bacteria which are found on their surface.

== Description ==
=== External morphology ===
Bihospites cells are colourless, do not contain a cell wall, and are from 40 to 120 μm long and 15–30 μm wide. Each cell has an elongated shape and contains two flagella, with the anterior flagellum facing forward and the posterior flagellum trailing behind. The flagella are inserted subapically within a flagellar pocket and each provide a different function for the cell, with the anterior flagella helping pull the cell forward along the substrate during gliding. The cell surface of Bihospites consists of S-shaped folds with a continuous array of microtubules beneath the surface, which are morphologically similar to the pellicle strips in metabolic euglenids, a different group of Euglenozoa. Bihospites have been observed to be highly contractile and undergo metabolic movement.

Bihospites cells are covered by both rod-shaped and spherical-shaped epibiotic bacteria that are arranged in rows positioned from the anterior to posterior end of the cell. The rod-shaped epibiotic bacteria are 3–5 μm long, while the spherical-shaped bacteria are an order of magnitude smaller and have a diameter of 0.6 μm, with both found to be associated with the cell membrane of the Bihospites host cells. The rod-shaped epibionts form bands along the cell with rows of spherical-shaped epibionts arranged between each band. Each spherical-shaped epibiont is positioned within the small, concave region on the cell membrane between the S-shaped folds. The spherical-shaped bacteria are a lineage of verrucomicrobial bacteria which are known as epixenosomes as they are extrusive in nature to help defend against predators. Each spherical-shaped bacterium appears to have the ability to rapidly discharge a tightly coiled thread through a pore from within itself when disturbed, similar to a defensive extrusome.

=== Internal ultrastructure ===
Like many euglenozoans, Bihospites contain clusters of tubular extrusomes, each about 4 μm long, positioned beneath the cell membrane which emerge at the tips of each S-shaped fold on the cell membrane. The cytoplasm of Bihospites contains many vacuoles, some of which contain intracellular bacteria.

There are several ultrastructural features found within the cytoplasm of Bihospites that have been observed in other lineages that survive within a semi-anoxic or anoxic environment. The anterior end of each Bihospites cell contains several black bodies which may be associated with survival in a low oxygen environment, as similar black inclusions have been noted in semi-anoxic ciliate and euglenid lineages [5]. As well, immediately below the microtubule array under the surface of Bihospites cells, a layer of derived mitochondrial organelles is present. The mitochondrial-derived organelles are similar to hydrogenosomes, and contain reduced cristae. These hydrogenosome-like reduced mitochondria have been observed in other species of Symbiontida, as well as other anaerobic protists, and may be associated with survival in low oxygen environments.

Bihospites cells have a unique and complex C-shaped rod apparatus composed of lamellae that associates the feeding apparatus with the nucleus of each cell. The posterior end of a single rod structure is situated at the bottom of the feeding pocket, while the anterior end of this rod encircles and surrounds the anterior end of the nucleus. This positioning generates a C-shape around the nucleus of the cell. Surrounding the C-shaped rod is an accessory rod structure which is also associated with the feeding pocket. In Bihospites cells, the feeding and flagellar pockets are associated with one another, forming a structure known as a subapical vestibulum. Between the feeding pocket and flagellar pocket, a cytostomal funnel is present which is formed as an extension of the posterior end of the accessory rod, which then surrounds the C-shaped rod apparatus. Rod-based feeding apparatuses have been observed in other euglenozoan lineages, such as some diplonemids and euglenids, however this exact feeding apparatus structure is unique to Bihospites.

Bihospites cells contain one indented nucleus, which is associated with the feeding pocket via the C-shaped rod apparatus present within each cell. This association results in the nucleus being positioned consistently in the anterior region of the cell. Chromosomes within the nucleus are found to be permanently condensed. Sexual reproduction of Bihospites has not yet been observed and currently, the life cycle of Bihospites is unknown.

== Genetics ==
Genetics of Bihospites are not well known however its phylogenetic position within Symbiontida is well supported through molecular phylogenetic data from small-subunit rDNA. Kinetoplasts, which are unique organizations of mitochondrial DNA present in kinetoplastids, a different lineage of Euglenozoans, were not observed within the reduced mitochondria of Bihospites.

== Practical importance ==
Currently, the practical importance of Bihospites is unknown. However, the presence of spherical-shaped epibiont bacteria on the cell surface, which rapidly discharge when disturbed similar to defensive extrusive organelles, can provide information on the evolution of extrusive organelles when compared to the different types of extrusomes present within other eukaryotic lineages.
