= David Tuveson =

American cancer biologist (born 1966)

- Born: January 1, 1966 (age 60)
- Education: Massachusetts Institute of Technology; Johns Hopkins School of Medicine
- Known for: Developing mouse and organoid models of pancreatic cancer
- Awards: Rita Allen Foundation Scholar Award; 2022 Luminary Award
- Scientific career
- Fields: Cancer biology
- Workplaces: Cold Spring Harbor Laboratory; University of Pennsylvania; Cambridge Research Institute
- Doctoral advisor: Douglas Fearon

David Arthur Tuveson (born January 1, 1966) is an American cancer biologist and is currently Executive Director of the Duke Cancer Institute. He was formerly the Roy J. Zuckerberg Professor of Cancer Research as well as The Cancer Center Director at Cold Spring Harbor Laboratory. Dr. Tuveson is also the Chief Scientist for the Lustgarten Foundation for Pancreatic Cancer Research. He is known for developing some of the first mouse models of pancreatic cancer and more recently, for his work developing pancreatic cancer organoids.

== Education and training ==
David Tuveson received a B.S. in chemistry from the Massachusetts Institute of Technology in 1987. He received an M.D. and Ph.D. from the Johns Hopkins School of Medicine in 1994, where his Ph.D. adviser was Douglas Fearon. He completed a residency at Brigham and Women's Hospital from 1994-1997. From 1997-2000, he pursued a Fellowship in Hematology and Oncology at the Dana–Farber Cancer Institute. During this time, he also performed postdoctoral research in mouse models of lung cancer in the laboratory of Tyler Jacks at the Massachusetts Institute of Technology.

== Career ==
Following completion of his fellowship training, Tuveson started his own laboratory at the University of Pennsylvania, where he was an assistant professor of medicine from 2002 to 2006. In 2006, he moved to the Cambridge Research Institute, where he was a senior group leader and a professor of pancreatic cancer medicine. In 2012, he took a position as a group leader and the deputy director of the Cancer Center at Cold Spring Harbor Laboratory. In 2016, Tuveson assumed the position of Director of the Cold Spring Harbor Laboratory Cancer Center. He served as the President for the American Association for Cancer Research from 2021 to 2022. He is a member of the editorial board for Oncogene, Journal of Experimental Medicine, and Cancer Discovery (journal). He also serves on the scientific advisory board for Leap Therapeutics and the Board of Scientific Advisors for the National Cancer Institute. In 2020, Tuveson was elected as Fellow of the American Association for Cancer Research, and in 2022, he was elected to the National Academy of Medicine. He also co-founded the biotechnology company Mestag Therapeutics in 2021.

== Research ==
During his postdoctoral training in the Jacks Laboratory, Tuveson learned how to engineer mouse models to study human cancer. During this time, he also studied gastrointestinal stromal tumors (GISTs), and worked with Dr. George Demetri to develop imatinib as a treatment for GIST. When he started his own laboratory at the University of Pennsylvania, Tuveson developed some of the first genetically engineered mouse models to aid in the study of pancreatic cancer. Using these mice, Tuveson has made several important discoveries in the biology of pancreatic cancer, including the work that contributed to the idea that the stromal cells of pancreatic tumors act as a barrier for therapies. He later partnered with Hans Clevers to develop pancreatic cancer organoids – tumor cells taken from a human patient and cultured in the laboratory as three-dimensional spheres. In 2017, he partnered with the National Cancer Institute to develop organoids for use more broadly by the cancer research community.

== Honors and awards ==
David Tuveson was given an AACR-PanCAN Career Development Award in Pancreatic Cancer research in 2003. He was also the recipient of an M.L. Smith Award in 2003, a Rita Allen Foundation Scholar Award in 2004, and a Distinguished Scholar Award from the Lustgarten Foundation. He was awarded Hamdan Award for Medical Research Excellence - Pancreatic Diseases by Hamdan Medical Award in 2016. He received a 2022 Luminary Award and was on Clarivate’s list of the top most cited researchers in 2022.

== Major publications ==
Tuveson has an h-index of 102 according to Google Scholar. Some of his most important publications are:

- Johnson, L., Mercer, K., Greenbaum, D., Bronson, R.T., Crowley, D., Tuveson, D.A., Jacks, T. Somatic activation of the K-ras oncogene causes early onset lung cancer in mice. Nature. 410:1111-1116 (2001)
- Demetri, G.D., von Mehren, M., Blanke, C.D., Van den Abbeele, A.D., Eisenberg, B., Roberts, P.J., Heinrich, M.C., Tuveson, D.A., Singer, S., Janicek, M., Fletcher, J.A., Silverman, S.G., Silberman, S.L., Capdeville, R., Kiese, B., Peng, B., Dimitrijevic, S., Druker, B.J., Corless, C., Fletcher, C.D.M., and Joensuu, H. Efficacy and safety of imatinib mesylate in advanced gastrointestinal stromal tumors. New England Journal of Medicine. 347:472-480 (2002)
- Hingorani, S.R., Petricoin, E.F., Maitra, A., Rajapakse, V., King, C., Jacobetz, M.A., Ross, S., Conrads, T.P., Veenstra, T.D., Hitt, B.A., Kawaguchi, Y., Johann, D., Liotta, L.A., Crawford, H.C., Putt, M.E., Jacks, T., Wright, C.V., Hruban, R.H., Lowy, A.M., Tuveson, D.A. Preinvasive and invasive ductal pancreatic cancer and its early detection in the mouse. Cancer Cell. 4:437-450 (2003)
- Hingorani, S.R., Wang, L., Multani, A.S., Combs, C., Deramaudt, T.B., Hruban, R.H., Rustgi, A.K., Chang, S., Tuveson, D.A. Trp53R172H and KrasG12D cooperate to promote chromosomal instability and widely metastatic pancreatic ductal adenocarcinoma in mice. Cancer Cell. 7:469-483 (2005)
- Olive, K.P., Jacobetz, M.A., Davidson, C.J., Gopinathan, A., McIntyre, D., Honess, D., Madhu, B., Goldgraben, M.A., Caldwell, M.E., Allard, D., Frese, K.K., Denicola, G., Feig, C., Combs, C., Winter, S.P., Ireland-Zecchini, H., Reichelt, S., Howat, W.J., Chang, A., Dhara, M., Wang, L., Rückert, F., Grützmann, R., Pilarsky, C., Izeradjene, K., Hingorani, S.R., Huang, P., Davies, S.E., Plunkett, W., Egorin, M., Hruban, R.H., Whitebread, N., McGovern, K., Adams, J., Iacobuzio-Donahue, C., Griffiths, J., Tuveson, D.A. Inhibition of Hedgehog signaling enhances delivery of chemotherapy in a mouse model of pancreatic cancer. Science. 324:1457-1461 (2009)
- DeNicola, G.M., Karreth, F.A., Humpton, T.J., Gopinathan, A., Wei, C., Frese, K., Mangal, D., Yu, K.H., Yeo, C.J., Calhoun, E.S., Scrimieri, F., Winter, J.M., Hruban, R.H., Iacobuzio-Donahue, C., Kern, S.E., Blair, I.A., Tuveson, D.A. Oncogene-induced Nrf2 transcription promotes ROS detoxification and tumorigenesis. Nature. 475:106-109 (2011)
- Boj, S.F., Hwang, C.I., Baker, L.A., Chio, I.I., Engle, D.D., Corbo, V., Jager, M., Ponz-Sarvise, M., Tiriac, H., Spector, M.S., Gracanin, A., Oni, T., Yu, K.H., van Boxtel, R., Huch, M., Rivera, K.D., Wilson, J.P., Feigin, M.E., Öhlund, D., Handly-Santana, A., Ardito-Abraham, C.M., Ludwig, M., Elyada, E., Alagesan, B., Biffi, G., Yordanov, G.N., Delcuze, B., Creighton, B., Wright, K., Park, Y., Morsink, F.H., Molenaar, I.Q., Borel Rinkes, I.H., Cuppen, E., Hao, Y., Jin, Y., Nijman, I.J., Iacobuzio-Donahue, C., Leach, S.D., Pappin, D.J., Hammell, M., Klimstra, D.S., Basturk, O., Hruban, R.H., Offerhaus, G.J., Vries, R.G., Clevers, H., Tuveson, D.A. Organoid models of human and mouse ductal pancreatic cancer. Cell. 160:324-338 (2015)
- Chio, I.I.C., Jafarnejad, S.M., Ponz-Sarvise, M., Park, Y., Rivera, K., Palm, W., Wilson, J., Sangar, V., Hao, Y., Öhlund, D., Wright, K., Filippini, D., Lee, E.J., Da Silva, B., Schoepfer, C., Wilkinson, J.E., Buscaglia, J.M., DeNicola, G.M., Tiriac, H., Hammell, M., Crawford, H.C., Schmidt, E.E., Thompson, C.B., Pappin, D.J., Sonenberg, N., Tuveson, D.A. NRF2 Promotes Tumor Maintenance by Modulating mRNA Translation in Pancreatic Cancer. Cell. 166:963-976 (2016)
- Öhlund, D., Handly-Santana, A., Biffi, G., Elyada, E., Almeida, A.S., Ponz-Sarvise, M., Corbo, V., Oni, T.E., Hearn, S.A., Lee, E.J., Chio, I.I., Hwang, C.I., Tiriac, H., Baker, L.A., Engle, D.D., Feig, C., Kultti, A., Egeblad, M., Fearon, D.T., Crawford, J.M., Clevers, H., Park, Y., Tuveson, D.A. Distinct populations of inflammatory fibroblasts and myofibroblasts in pancreatic cancer. Journal of Experimental Medicine. 214(3):579-596 (2017)
- Tiriac, H., Belleau, P., Engle, D.D., Plenker, D., Deschênes, A., Somerville, T.D.D., Froeling, F.E.M., Burkhart, R.A., Denroche, R.E., Jang, G.H., Miyabayashi, K., Young, C.M., Patel, H., Ma, M., LaComb, J.F., Palmaira, R.L.D., Javed, A.A., Huynh, J.C., Johnson, M., Arora, K., Robine, N., Shah, M., Sanghvi, R., Goetz, A.B., Lowder, C.Y., Martello, L., Driehuis, E., LeComte, N., Askan, G., Iacobuzio-Donahue, C.A., Clevers, H., Wood, L.D., Hruban, R.H., Thompson, E., Aguirre, A.J., Wolpin, B.M., Sasson, A., Kim, J., Wu, M., Bucobo, J.C., Allen, P., Sejpal, D.V., Nealon, W., Sullivan, J.D., Winter, J.M., Gimotty, P.A., Grem, J.L., DiMaio, D.J., Buscaglia, J.M., Grandgenett, P.M., Brody, J.R., Hollingsworth, M.A., O'Kane, G.M., Notta, F., Kim, E., Crawford, J.M., Devoe, C., Ocean, A., Wolfgang, C.L., Yu, K.H., Li, E., Vakoc, C.R., Hubert, B., Fischer, S.E., Wilson, J.M., Moffitt, R., Knox, J., Krasnitz, A., Gallinger, S., Tuveson, D.A. Organoid Profiling Identifies Common Responders to Chemotherapy in Pancreatic Cancer. Cancer Discovery. 8:1112-1129 (2018)
- Elyada, E., Bolisetty, M., Laise, P., Flynn, W.F., Courtois, E.T., Burkhart, R.A., Teinor, J.A., Belleau, P., Biffi, G., Lucito, M.S., Sivajothi, S., Armstrong, T.D., Engle, D.D., Yu, K.H., Hao, Y., Wolfgang, C.L., Park, Y., Preall, J., Jaffee, E.M., Califano, A., Robson, P., Tuveson, D.A. Cross-Species Single-Cell Analysis of Pancreatic Ductal Adenocarcinoma Reveals Antigen-Presenting Cancer-Associated Fibroblasts. Cancer Discovery. 9:1102-1123 (2019)
- Biffi, G., Oni, T.E., Spielman, B., Hao, Y., Elyada, E., Park, Y., Preall, J., Tuveson, D.A. IL1-Induced JAK/STAT Signaling Is Antagonized by TGFβ to Shape CAF Heterogeneity in Pancreatic Ductal Adenocarcinoma. Cancer Discovery. 9:282-301 (2019)
- Engle, D.D., Tiriac, H., Rivera, K.D., Pommier, A., Whalen, S., Oni, T.E., Alagesan, B., Lee, E.J., Yao, M.A., Lucito, M.S., Spielman, B., Da Silva, B., Schoepfer, C., Wright, K., Creighton, B., Afinowicz, L., Yu, K.H., Grützmann, R., Aust, D., Gimotty, P.A., Pollard, K.S., Hruban, R.H., Goggins, M.G., Pilarsky, C., Park, Y., Pappin, D.J., Hollingsworth, M.A., Tuveson, D.A. The glycan CA19-9 promotes pancreatitis and pancreatic cancer in mice. Science. 364:1156-1162 (2019)
