= Murray Shear =

American cancer biologist

- Born: November 7, 1899; Brooklyn, New York City
- Died: September 27, 1983 (aged 83); Bethesda, Maryland
- Education: City University of New York, Columbia University
- Scientific career
- Fields: Biomedical Engineering, Cell Biology, Biochemistry, Cancer, Chemotherapy, Oncology
- Workplaces: Columbia University, Harvard University, National Institutes of Health, National Cancer Institute, Brooklyn Jewish Hospital and Medical Center, Long Island Jewish Medical Center, United States Public Health Service, American Association for Cancer Research, International Union Against Cancer

Murray Shear was an American scientist who worked on cancer research and was a pioneer in the field of Chemotherapy.

== Early life and education ==
Murray Jacob Shear was born on November 7, 1899, in Brooklyn, NY. He developed an early interest in philosophy. While attending the City College of New York for his bachelor's degree (Chemistry, 1922), he became interested in chemical physics research. After receiving his M.Sc. and Ph.D. from Columbia University (both in Chemistry) in 1925, Murray Shear took a position as a research chemist in the pediatric research laboratory at the Jewish Hospital in Brooklyn, where he studied the chemistry of rickets. By 1926, Shear had become an administrative officer at the hospital, and in 1931, he held the concurrent position of instructor in pediatrics at the Long Island Medical School. He was also a member of the Columbia faculty from 1923 to 1925.

== Scientific career ==
In 1930, the Public Health Service (PHS) Special Laboratory of Cancer Investigations opened a facility at Harvard Medical School to conduct research on the biology, chemistry, and physics of cancer. The head of the laboratory, Joseph Schereschewsky, recruited Shear to be a biochemist. Shear's early research involved the effect of calcium on tumor growth, but, seeking agents to halt the growth of cancer cells, he turned to studies on bacterial toxins. In 1937, President Franklin Roosevelt signed an act establishing the National Cancer Institute (NCI). There followed the consolidation of the PHS facilities and the Harvard laboratory. They moved to the newly built NCI building in Bethesda, Maryland.

Shear's research interests included the effect of chemicals on cancer. He investigated how the molecular structure of chemicals relates to cancer growth. In 1938, he discovered that some chemicals may not cause cancer themselves but can promote cancer growth when found in conjunction with other chemicals. He called such cancer-enabling substances "co-carcinogens." During the 1940s, Shear was instrumental in setting up a program to screen chemicals for their effects on cancer cells growing in culture dishes. This program was a precursor of the NCI's large screening programs to identify potential anti-cancer drugs.

He described the earliest accounts of cancer chemotherapy in a series of articles in the Journal of the National Cancer Institute in 1944. With his collaborators at the institute, Shear was able to isolate and purify a bacteria (Bacillus prodigious or Serratia marcescens) effective in causing a hemorrhagic destruction of tumors in mice without fatal effects for the animals.

== Legacy ==
In 1947, Shear became chief biochemist and chairman of the Chemotherapy Section. He was appointed chief of the Laboratory of Chemical Pharmacology in 1951, serving until 1964. From 1964 to 1969, he served as a special adviser to the institute's director until his retirement in 1969. During his career, Shear also served as president of the American Association for Cancer Research and secretary-general of the International Union Against Cancer. He has been widely regarded as the "Father of Chemotherapy."

He was also among the first scientists who detected the relationship of air pollution to cancer. During World War II, Shear was considered to have played an important role in the development of a vaccine for typhus, which at one time was a killer disease among soldiers subjected to the unsanitary conditions of Trench warfare.

He died of Parkinson's disease at Suburban Hospital in Bethesda on September 17, 1983.
