= Cancer Prevention Research =

- Discipline: Oncology
- Language: English
- Edited by: Raymond N. DuBois, MD, PhD; Michael Pollak, MD

Publication details
- History: 2008-present
- Publisher: American Association for Cancer Research
- Frequency: 12/year
- Impact factor: 3.473 (2019)

Standard abbreviations
- ISO 4: Cancer Prev. Res. (Phila.)

Indexing
- ISSN: 1940-6207 (print); 1940-6215 (web)

Links
- Journal homepage; Online access; Online archive

Cancer Prevention Research is a peer-reviewed medical journal that publishes original studies, reviews, and commentaries in the fields of cancer prevention and interception. It was launched in 2008 by its publisher, the American Association for Cancer Research. The journal's current editors-in-chief are Raymond N. DuBois and Michael N. Pollak, who were appointed in 2018.
