= Edwin R. LeCount =

American physician (1868–1935)

Edwin Raymond LeCount
- Born: April 1, 1868; Fond du Lac, Wisconsin
- Died: August 23, 1935 (aged 67); Chicago, Illinois
- Education: Rush Medical College (MD)
- Scientific career
- Fields: Pathology
- Workplaces: Rush Medical College

Edwin Raymond LeCount (April 1, 1868 – August 23, 1935) was an American pathologist, bacteriologist, and forensic pathologist. He was a professor of pathology at Rush Medical College in Chicago for more than four decades and was recognized for his expertise in forensic pathology, particularly traumatic fractures of the skull. He testified as an expert in several high-profile Chicago trials. His research covered a wide range of subjects, reflecting his broad interests in pathology and medicine.

== Education ==
LeCount was born on April 1, 1868, in Fond du Lac, Wisconsin. He graduated from Rush Medical College in 1892 with an MD and subsequently completed an internship at Cook County Hospital in Chicago. He received additional training in microbiology at the Johns Hopkins Hospital in Baltimore in 1893–1894, where he worked in the laboratory of William H. Welch, and at the Pasteur Institute in Paris in 1896. In 1905, he studied biochemistry at the universities of Berlin and Halle in Germany.

== Career ==
LeCount spent his academic career at Rush Medical College, where he was professor of pathology from 1892 until his death in 1935. He was also active in forensic pathology and served as physician to the Cook County coroner's office from 1911 to 1924. He participated as an expert in a number of prominent Chicago cases, including the second trial of Adolph Luetgert for the murder of his wife. His publications included studies of traumatic fractures of the skull, and he contributed to contemporary works on forensic medicine. In 1922, he performed the autopsy on Rosa and Josefa Blazek, conjoined twins who were joined at the pelvis.

LeCount's research encompassed a variety of subjects in pathology, including cancer. In 1899, he published a study titled "Lymphoma, a benign tumor representing a lymph gland in structure," describing the microscopic features of a lymph node lesion. More than a century later, a 2022 review noted that LeCount's description and illustrations closely resembled the pathological features of Castleman disease, first reported by Benjamin Castleman and colleagues in 1956, and suggested that LeCount should be recognized for his earlier description.

LeCount was active in professional medical organizations. He served as president of the American Association of Pathologists and Bacteriologists in 1911 and as president of the American Association for Cancer Research from 1918 to 1919.

== Personal life and death ==
LeCount married Anna Rowley in 1898. They had a daughter, Ellen. LeCount died of heart disease on August 23, 1935.

== Selected publications ==
- LeCount, E. R. (1899). "Lymphoma, a benign tumor representing a lymph gland in structure." Journal of Experimental Medicine. 4 (5–6): 559–567.
- LeCount, E. R. (1911). "A contribution to the pathological anatomy of Rocky Mountain Spotted Fever." Journal of Infectious Diseases. 8 (4): 421–426.
- LeCount, E. R. (1919). "The pathologic anatomy of influenzal bronchopneumonia." JAMA. 72 (9): 650–652.
- LeCount, E. R.; Apfelbach, C. W. (1920). "Pathologic anatomy of traumatic fractures of cranial bones and concomitant brain injuries." JAMA. 74 (8): 501–511.
