= American Association for Cancer Research =

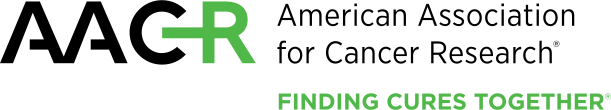
- Formation: May 7, 1907; 119 years ago
- Headquarters: 615 Chestnut St., 17th Floor; Philadelphia, Pennsylvania 19106-4404
- Members: More than 58,000
- Official language: English
- Staff: More than 230
- Website: www.aacr.org

The American Association for Cancer Research (AACR) is the world's oldest and largest professional association related to cancer research. Based in Philadelphia, the AACR focuses on all aspects of cancer research, including basic, clinical, and translational research into the etiology, prevention, diagnosis, and treatment of cancer. Founded in 1907 by 11 physicians and scientists, the organization now has more than 58,000 members in 142 countries and territories. The mission of the AACR is to prevent and cure cancer through research, education, communication, collaboration, science policy and advocacy, and funding for cancer research.

== History ==
The AACR was founded on May 7, 1907, in Washington, D.C., as the "Association for Cancer Research" by a group of scientists consisting of four surgeons, five pathologists, and two biochemists. The founding members were Silas P. Beebe, George H. A. Clowes, William Coley, James Ewing, Harvey R. Gaylord, Robert B. Greenough, J. Collins Warren, George W. Crile, Leo Loeb, Frank Burr Mallory, and Ernest E. Tyzzer. They organized annual meetings to coincide with the meetings for the much larger meetings of the American Association of Pathologists and Bacteriologists. At the first meeting in New York City in November 1907, nine papers were presented. For the first 30 years, the group functioned as a select group of scientists, but with the expansion of cancer research in the 1930s, membership and interest grew. The society was officially incorporated in 1940.

== Meetings and workshops ==
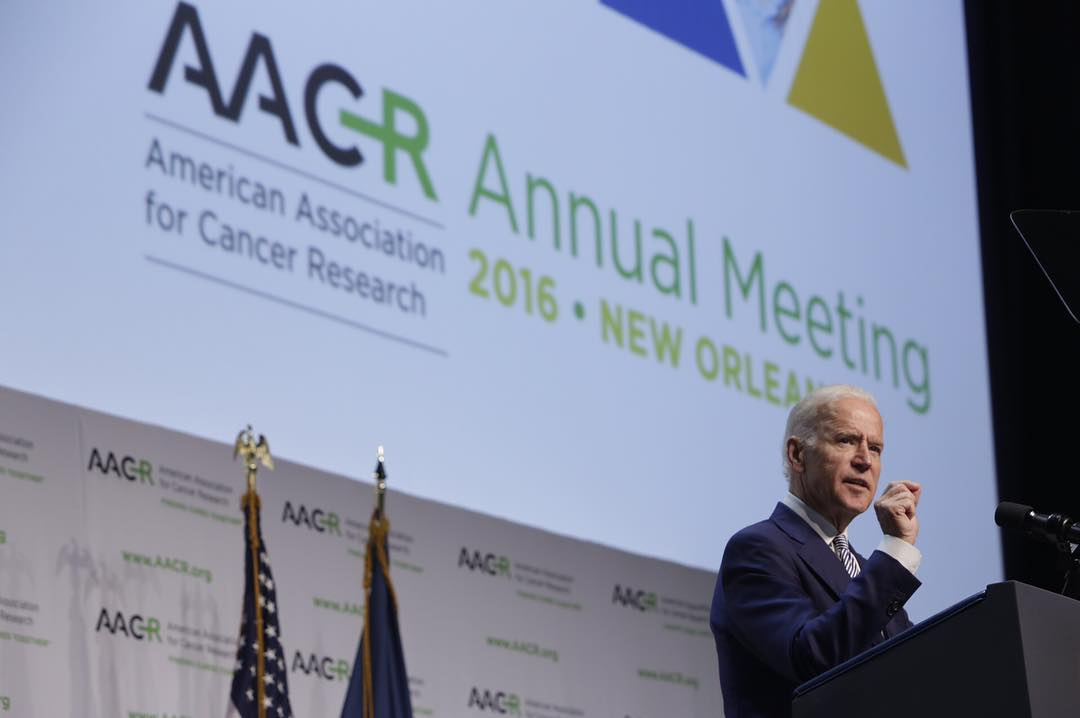
Vice President Joe Biden speaking at the 2016 AACR annual meeting about the Cancer Moonshot project

=== Annual meeting ===
AACR's annual meeting attracts more than 23,000 participants from around the world and has been described as the "main forum to present and discuss cancer-related research." Attendees gather to discuss over 7,000 abstracts and to hear more than 500 invited presentations on significant discoveries in basic, clinical, and translational cancer research. Scientific award lectures, grant writing workshops, networking events, and educational sessions round out this comprehensive program.

=== Conferences and educational workshops ===
In addition to the annual meeting, the AACR organizes approximately 30 other conferences and workshops each year, including:

- Smaller, more focused Special Conferences that are designed to share the latest advances in rapidly developing areas of cancer research;
- Larger International Conferences that recur on a regular basis, including collaborative programs such as the San Antonio Breast Cancer Symposium, Molecular Targets and Cancer Therapeutics Conference, and the Biennial Meeting on Advances in Malignant Lymphoma;
- Educational Workshops that train early-career investigators in clinical trial design, molecular biology, integrative molecular epidemiology, translational research, and related fields.

== Publications ==
The AACR publishes ten peer-reviewed scientific journals: Blood Cancer Discovery, Cancer Discovery, Cancer Research, Clinical Cancer Research, Cancer Immunology Research, Molecular Cancer Therapeutics, Molecular Cancer Research, Cancer Prevention Research, Cancer Epidemiology, Biomarkers & Prevention and Cancer Research Communications. The AACR also publishes Cancer Today, a magazine for cancer patients, survivors, and their families and friends, as well as an Annual Report, and CR which aims to foster collaboration between cancer survivors, patient advocates, physicians and scientists.

=== Cancer Research ===
Cancer Research is the second most-frequently cited cancer journal in the world. Papers are peer-reviewed, and only those that meet high standards of scientific merit are accepted for publication. The journal publishes significant, original studies, reviews, and perspectives on all areas of basic, clinical, translational, epidemiological, and prevention research in cancer and the cancer-related biomedical sciences. Some of the topics include biochemistry; chemical, physical, and viral carcinogenesis and mutagenesis; clinical research including clinical trials; endocrinology; epidemiology and prevention; experimental therapeutics, molecular targets, and chemical biology; immunology and immunotherapy including biological therapy; molecular biology, pathobiology, and genetics; radiobiology and radiation oncology; cell and tumor biology; tumor microenvironment; systems biology and other emerging technologies.

=== Cancer Discovery ===
The AACR launched Cancer Discovery in 2011 as a selective journal for basic, translational, and clinical cancer research. Cancer Discovery has become a premier journal in the field of cancer research, with a 2020 impact factor of 39.397 that is the highest among the AACR journals. Research published in the journal includes identification of actionable genomic alterations in cancer, mechanisms of therapy resistance, clinical trials on targeted therapy, and cancer immunotherapy research including immune checkpoint blockade and Chimeric Antigen Receptor (CAR) T-cell therapy.

== The AACR Foundation for the Prevention and Cure of Cancer ==
The AACR Foundation for the Prevention and Cure of Cancer is a 501(c)(3) public charity that provides financial support for scientific research, education, and communication. The foundation funds programs deemed by the AACR to be of the highest priority and impact in promoting research, supporting scientists, and raising awareness. Eighty-eight cents of every dollar raised by the AACR Foundation directly supports cancer research.

== Cancer Evolution Working Group (CEWG) ==
Following the Cancer & Evolution Symposium in October 2020, organized by Frank H. Laukien, James A. Shapiro, Denis Noble, Henry Heng and Perry Marshall, this Working Group was integrated into the AACR to facilitate an interdisciplinary approach to the study of cancer. The group now presents the monthly Cancer Evolution Seminar Series.

== Presidents ==
The names of the presidents from 1907 to 1960 were reported by Triolo in 1961.

Year	Name	Institution
2025-2026	Lillian Siu, MD	Princess Margaret Cancer Centre
2024-2025	Patricia M. LoRusso, DO	Yale School of Medicine
2023-2024	Philip Greenberg, MD	Fred Hutchinson Cancer Research Center
2022-2023	Lisa Coussens, PhD	Oregon Health & Science University
2021-2022	David Tuveson, MD, PhD	Cold Spring Harbor Laboratory
2020-2021	Antoni Ribas, MD, PhD	David Geffen School of Medicine at UCLA
2019-2020	Elaine R. Mardis, PhD	Nationwide Children's Hospital
2018-2019	Elizabeth M. Jaffee, MD	Sidney Kimmel Comprehensive Cancer Center
2017-2018	Michael A. Caligiuri, MD	City of Hope
2016-2017	Nancy E. Davidson, MD	University of Pittsburgh School of Medicine
2015-2016	Jose Baselga, MD, PhD	Memorial Sloan Kettering Cancer Center
2014-2015	Carlos Arteaga, MD	Vanderbilt-Ingram Cancer Center
2013-2014	Charles L. Sawyers, MD	Memorial Sloan Kettering Cancer Center
2012-2013	Frank McCormick, PhD	UCSF Helen Diller Family Comprehensive Cancer Center
2011-2012	Judy E. Garber, MD, MPH	Dana Farber Cancer Institute
2010-2011	Elizabeth H. Blackburn, PhD	Salk Institute for Biological Studies
2009-2010	Tyler Jacks, PhD	David H. Koch Institute for Integrative Cancer Research
2008-2009	Raymond N. DuBois, MD, PhD	Vanderbilt-Ingram Cancer Center
2007-2008	William N. Hait, MD, PhD	UMDNJ-Robert Wood Johnson Medical School
2006-2007	Geoffrey M. Wahl, PhD	Salk Institute for Biological Studies
2005-2006	Peter A. Jones, PhD, DSc	USC Norris Comprehensive Cancer Center
2004-2005	Lynn M. Matrisian, PhD	Vanderbilt-Ingram Cancer Center
2003-2004	Karen H. Antman, MD	Herbert Irving Comprehensive Cancer Center
2002-2003	Susan Band Horwitz, PhD	Albert Einstein College of Medicine
2001-2002	Waun Ki Hong, MD	University of Texas MD Anderson Cancer Center
2000-2001	Tom Curran, PhD	St. Jude Children’s Research Hospital
1999-2000	Daniel Von Hoff, MD	University of Texas Health Science Center at San Antonio
1998-1999	Webster K. Cavenee, PhD	University of California, San Diego
1997-1998	Donald S. Coffey, PhD	Johns Hopkins University School of Medicine
1996-1997	Louise C. Strong, MD	University of Texas MD Anderson Cancer Center
1995-1996	Joseph R. Bertino, MD	Memorial Sloan Kettering Cancer Center
1994-1995	Edward Bresnick, PhD	Dartmouth Medical School
1993-1994	Margaret L. Kripke, PhD	University of Texas MD Anderson Cancer Center
1992-1993	Lee W. Wattenberg, MD	University of Minnesota Medical School
1991-1992	Harold L. Moses, MD	Vanderbilt-Ingram Cancer Center
1990-1991	I. Bernard Weinstein, MD	Herbert Irving Comprehensive Cancer Center, Columbia University
1989-1990	Harris Busch, MD, PhD	Baylor College of Medicine
1988-1989	Lawrence A. Loeb, MD, PhD	University of Washington School of Medicine
1987-1988	Enrico Mihich, MD	Roswell Park Cancer Institute
1986-1987	Alan C. Sartorelli, PhD	Yale University School of Medicine
1985-1986	Arthur B. Pardee, PhD	Dana–Farber Cancer Institute
1984-1985	Isaiah J. Fidler, DVM, PhD	The University of Texas MD Anderson Cancer Center
1983-1984	Gertrude B. Elion, DSc	Burroughs Wellcome Company
1982-1983	Gerald C. Mueller, MD, PhD	McArdle Memorial Laboratory, University of Wisconsin
1981-1982	Sidney Weinhouse, PhD	Temple University Fels Research Institute
1980-1981	Bayard D. Clarkson, MD	Memorial Sloan Kettering Cancer Center
1979-1980	Paul P. Carbone, MD	University of Wisconsin Comprehensive Cancer Center
1978-1979	Hugh J. Creech, PhD	Institute for Cancer Research, Fox Chase Cancer Center
1977-1978	C. Gordon Zubrod, MD	University of Miami School of Medicine
1976-1977	Elizabeth C. Miller, PhD	McArdle Memorial Laboratory, University of Wisconsin
1975-1976	Charlotte Friend, PhD	Mount Sinai School of Medicine
1974-1975	Van R. Potter, PhD	McArdle Laboratory, University of Wisconsin
1973-1974	Michael B. Shimkin, MD	University of California, San Diego
1972-1973	Emmanuel Farber, MD, PhD	Children's Center Research Foundation
1971-1972	Emil Frei III, MD	M.D. Anderson Cancer Center
1970-1971	James F. Holland, MD	Roswell Park Memorial Institute
1969-1970	Abraham Cantarow, MD	Jefferson Medical College
1968-1969	Chester M. Southam, MD	Memorial Sloan Kettering Cancer Center
1967-1968	Lloyd W. Law, PhD	National Cancer Institute
1966-1967	Henry S. Kaplan, MD	Stanford Medical Center
1965-1966	Joseph H. Burchenal, MD	Memorial Sloan Kettering Cancer Center
1964-1965	Paul C. Zamecnik, MD	Harvard Medical School
1963-1964	Arthur C. Upton, MD	Oak Ridge National Laboratory
1962-1963	Alfred Gellhorn, MD	College of Physicians and Surgeons, Columbia University
1961-1962	Thelma B. Dunn, MD	National Cancer Institute
1960-1961	Murray J. Shear, PhD	National Cancer Institute
1959-1960	Theodore S. Hauschka, PhD	Roswell Park Memorial Institute
1958-1959	Harold L. Stewart, MD	National Cancer Institute
1957-1958	Jacob Furth, MD	Roswell Park Memorial Institute
1956-1957	Albert Tannenbaum, MD	Medical Research Institute, Michael Reese Hospital
1955-1956	Howard B. Andervont, DSc	National Cancer Institute
1954-1955	Austin M. Brues, MD	Argonne National Laboratory
1953-1954	Harold P. Rusch, MD	McArdle Memorial Laboratory, University of Wisconsin
1952-1953	Stanley P. Reimann, MD	Institute for Cancer Research, Philadelphia
1951-1952	Paul E. Steiner, MD, PhD	Institute for Cancer Research, Philadelphia
1950-1951	Edmund V. Cowdry, PhD	Washington University School of Medicine
1949-1950	Joseph C. Aub, MD	Massachusetts General Hospital
1948-1949	Charles B. Huggins, MD	University of Chicago School of Medicine
1947-1948	John J. Bittner, PhD	University of Minnesota Medical School
1946-1947	William U. Gardner, PhD	Yale University School of Medicine
1945-1946	Shields Warren, MD	New England Deaconess Hospital
1944-1945	Shields Warren, MD	New England Deaconess Hospital
1943-1944	Shields Warren, MD	New England Deaconess Hospital
1942-1943	Shields Warren, MD	New England Deaconess Hospital
1941-1942	Carl Voegtlin, PhD	National Cancer Institute
1940-1941	Burton T. Simpson, MD	New York State Institute for the Study of Malignant Diseases
1939-1940	Clarence C. Little, DSc	Jackson Laboratory
1938-1939	George H.A. Clowes, PhD	Eli Lilly and Company
1937-1938	James Ewing, MD	The Memorial Hospital for the Treatment of Cancer and Allied Diseases
1936-1937	William H. Woglom, MD	College of Physicians and Surgeons, Columbia University
1935-1936	Elexious T. Bell, MD	University of Minnesota Medical School
1934-1935	Millard C. Marsh, MS	New York State Institute for the Study of Malignant Diseases
1933-1934	Ward J. MacNeal, MD, PhD	New York University College of Medicine
1932-1933	Edward B. Krumbhaar, MD	University of Pennsylvania
1931-1932	Francis Carter Wood, MD	College of Physicians and Surgeons, Columbia University
1930-1931	Clarence C. Little, DSc	Jackson Laboratory
1929-1930	Frank B. Mallory, MD	Harvard Medical School
1928-1929	J.F. Schamberg, MD	University of Pennsylvania
1927-1928	Aldred Scott Warthin, MD, PhD	University of Michigan Medical School
1926-1927	Burton T. Simpson, MD	New York State Institute for the Study of Malignant Diseases
1925-1926	Channing Simmons, MD	Massachusetts General Hospital
1924-1925	Erwin F. Smith, ScD	US Department of Agriculture
1923-1924	William Duane, PhD	Harvard Medical School
1922-1923	Willy Meyer, MD	New York Post-Graduate Medical School and Hospital
1921-1922	James B. Murphy, MD	Rockefeller Institute for Medical Research
1920-1921	Robert B. Greenough, MD	Harvard Medical School
1919-1920	H. Gideon Wells, MD	University of Chicago School of Medicine
1918-1919	Edwin R. LeCount, MD	Rush Medical College
1917-1918	Francis Carter Wood, MD	College of Physicians and Surgeons, Columbia University
1916-1917	Harvey R. Gaylord, MD	New York State Institute for the Study of Malignant Diseases
1915-1916	H. Gideon Wells, MD	University of Chicago School of Medicine
1914-1915	S. Burt Wolbach, MD	Harvard Medical School
1913-1914	Gary N. Calkins, PhD	Columbia University
1912-1913	Ernest E. Tyzzer, MD	Harvard Medical School
1911-1912	Leo Loeb, MD	Washington University School of Medicine
1910-1911	Frank B. Mallory, MD	Harvard Medical School
1909-1910	Harvey R. Gaylord, MD	New York State Institute for the Study of Malignant Diseases
1908-1909	James Ewing, MD	Cornell University Medical School
1907-1908	James Ewing, MD	Cornell University Medical School

== Funding programs ==
Since establishing its grant program in 1993, the AACR has awarded more than $425 million in funding to more than 800 scientists for cancer research projects that aim to advance the understanding and treatment of cancer. AACR grants support researchers, both domestically and abroad, at every career stage, from fellowships to career development awards to major grants for independent investigators.

The AACR is the Scientific Partner of Stand Up To Cancer, a movement to accelerate innovative cancer research, get new therapies to patients quickly, and save lives.

== Awards and Fellows ==
The AACR honors scientists and clinicians who have made significant contributions to the understanding of the diagnosis, prevention and treatment of cancer through the presentation of 17 Scientific Achievement Awards and Lectureships.

The AACR Academy was established in 2013 to recognize and honor distinguished scientists whose major scientific contributions have propelled significant innovation and progress against cancer and advanced the mission of the AACR to prevent and cure all cancers through research, education, communication, and collaboration. A new class of Fellows of the AACR Academy is inducted each year at the AACR Annual Meeting.

== See also ==
- Cancer
- Chemotherapy
- Experimental cancer treatments
- Radiation therapy
