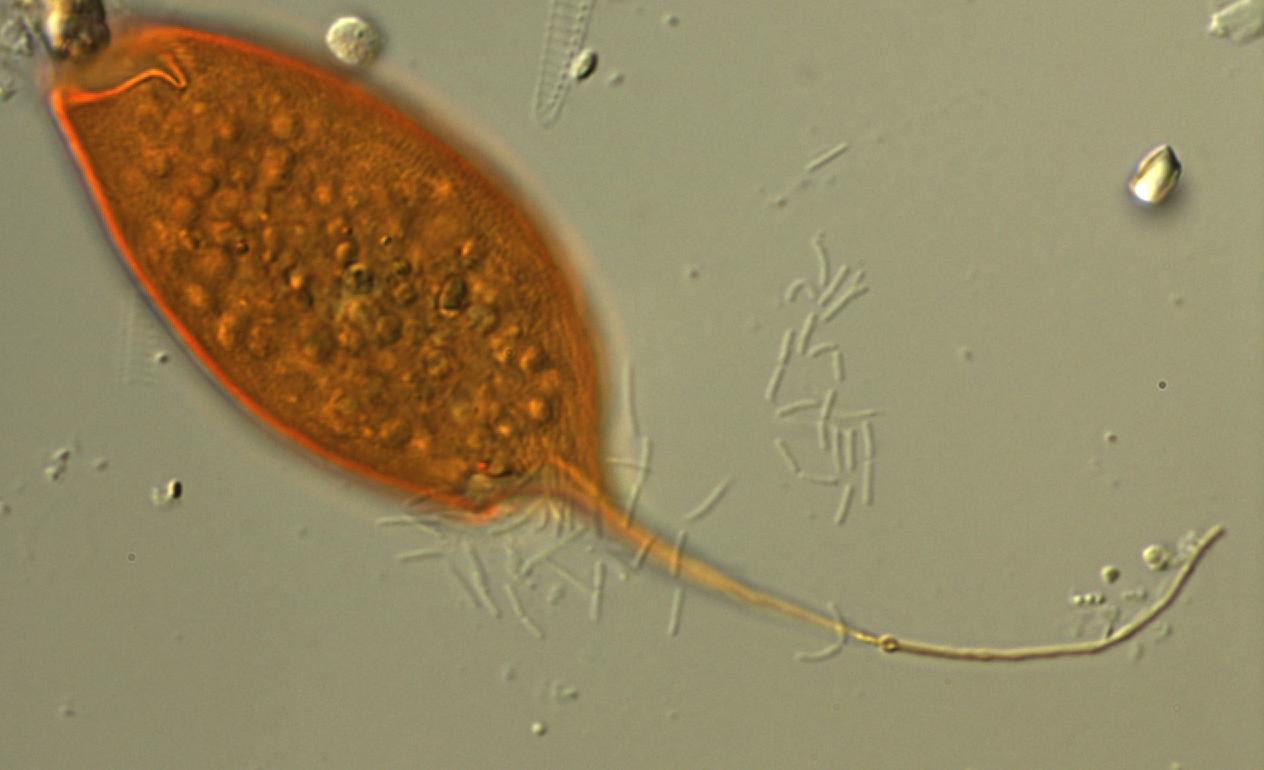

Scientific classification
- Domain: Eukaryota
- Clade: Discoba
- Phylum: Euglenozoa
- Class: Symbiontida
- Order: Postgaardida
- Family: Calkinsiidae; Cavalier-Smith, 2016
- Genus: Calkinsia; Lackey, 1960 non Nieuwland, 1916
- Species: C. aurea

Binomial name
- Calkinsia aurea Lackey, 1960

= Calkinsia =

Genus of algae

Calkinsia is a monotypic genus of excavates comprising the single species Calkinsia aurea. It lives in low-oxygen seafloor environments. It is not classified in any of the three well-known groups of the Euglenozoa (Kinetoplastida, Euglenida or Diplonemida), but is placed in its own group, the Symbiontida (along with some DNA sequences which were found in marine environments but not identified with known organisms). Some authors have classified Calkinsia alongside Postgaardi, but Postgaardi has not been studied well enough to test this hypothesis.

The genus name of Calkinsia is in honour of Gary Nathan Calkins (1869 – 1943), who was an American protozoologist and a professor at Columbia University. He wrote several landmark textbooks on the biology of the protozoa.
