= Robert B. Greenough =

American medical researcher (1871–1937)

Robert Battey Greenough
- Born: November 9, 1871; Cambridge, Massachusetts
- Died: February 16, 1937 (aged 65); Boston, MA
- Education: Harvard University (BS); Harvard Medical School (MD)
- Scientific career
- Fields: Cancer research
- Workplaces: Harvard Medical School

Robert Battey Greenough (November 9, 1871 - February 16, 1937) was a leading American cancer specialist in the early 20th century. He was also one of the founders of, and a president of, the American Association for Cancer Research.

== Early life and education ==
Greenough was born in Cambridge, Massachusetts to James B. Greenough (a Harvard professor of Latin) and Mary Ketchum Greenough. He received his undergraduate degree in 1892 from Harvard University and medical degree in 1896 from Harvard Medical School. He also studied in Vienna and Göettingen, studying pathology and developing an interest in cancer.

== Career ==
After returning to the United States from Europe, he worked under Dr. John Collins Warren. He was an Assistant Professor of Surgery at Harvard Medical School from 1909 until 1932, and was a surgeon at Massachusetts General Hospital for most of his career. He was also a surgeon with the American Ambulance Corps during World War I, and became a lieutenant commander leading the surgical service at the Naval Hospital in Chelsea, Massachusetts after the United States entered the war.

Greenough advocated that two methods for controlling cancer existed; prevention, and prompt use of effective treatment methods. He surveyed surgeons in an attempt to develop best practices for cancer diagnosis and treatment, publishing guidelines on it in 1917. Much of his study and writing was devoted to tumors, including breast tumors. In the 1920s, Greenough argued that breast cancer specimens showed three classes of disease: low, medium, and high malignancy, with lower classes having higher survival rates. Though Greenough supported the use of Halstead radical mastectomy as the appropriate treatment for breast cancer for his career, such research was a step toward later questioning of whether a single radical method was necessary in all cases.

Greenough founded the first "tumor clinic" while at Mass General, a concept which spread around the world.

In his 1934 inaugural address to the American College of Surgeons (of which he served as president in 1934-35), he endorsed the use of prepayment health insurance plans to allow adequate medical care to be within the reach of average people, though he did not endorse the concept of single-payer healthcare. Greenough's 1937 Associated Press obituary described this address as a "turning point" because bodies such as this one had previously been opposed to such plans.

== Personal life and death ==
Greenough married Amelia Mackay Goodwin in 1900. He died of a heart attack on February 16, 1937, at age 65, survived by his wife and four daughters. Amelia died at the age of 100 in 1973.
