= Cancer Immunology Research =

- Discipline: Oncology
- Language: English
- Edited by: Robert D. Schreiber, Philip Greenberg

Publication details
- History: 2013–present
- Publisher: American Association for Cancer Research (United States)
- Frequency: Monthly
- Open access: Hybrid
- Impact factor: 12.020 (2021)

Standard abbreviations
- ISO 4: Cancer Immunol. Res.

Indexing
- ISSN: 2326-6066 (print); 2326-6074 (web)
- LCCN: 2013200541
- OCLC no.: 827228258

Links
- Journal homepage; Journal Archive

Cancer Immunology Research is a monthly peer-reviewed medical journal published by the American Association for Cancer Research. It covers research and clinical trials related to the study of cancer immunology. The editors-in-chief are Robert D. Schreiber and Philip Greenberg. The journal was established in 2013.

== Abstracting and indexing ==
The journal is abstracted and indexed in:

- Biological Abstracts
- BIOSIS Previews
- Embase
- Index Medicus/MEDLINE/PubMed
- Science Citation Index Expanded
- Scopus

According to the Journal Citation Reports, the journal has a 2021 impact factor of 12.020.
