= Tom Curran (medical researcher) =

Scottish pathologist

Tom Curran FRS
- Born: 14 February 1956 (age 70)
- Education: University of Edinburgh; University College London
- Scientific career
- Fields: pathology
- Workplaces: University of Pennsylvania School of Medicine
- Thesis: Studies on the FBJ murine osteogeneic sarcoma virus complex (1982)
- Website: www.uphs.upenn.edu/news/news_releases/2009/10/institute-of-medicine/image-curran.html

Thomas Curran FRS is a Scottish medical researcher. He is the Executive Director and Chief Scientific Officer of the Children’s Mercy Research Institute at Children’s Mercy Hospital in Kansas City, Missouri, where he is also the Donald J. Hall Eminent Scholar in Pediatric Research. He is also a Professor of Pediatrics at the University of Missouri-Kansas City School of Medicine and a Professor of Cancer Biology at the University of Kansas School of Medicine. Before taking his current positions in 2016, he was a Professor of Pathology and Laboratory Medicine at the University of Pennsylvania School of Medicine, where he also served as Associate Director of Translational Genomics at the Penn Genome Frontiers Institute.

== Education ==
Curran was educated at the University of Edinburgh where he was awarded a Bachelor of Science degree in 1978. He was awarded a PhD from University College London in 1982 for studies on the murine osteogeneic sarcoma virus complex

== Career and research ==
He was chairman of the department of developmental neurobiology at St. Jude Children's Research Hospital.

He was president of the American Association for Cancer Research in 2000.

He is a member of the Institute of Medicine.

== Awards and honours ==
Curran was elected a Fellow of the Royal Society in 2005.
