= Cancer Research (journal) =

- Cover of Volume 62, Issue 23
- Discipline: Cancer, oncology
- Language: English
- Edited by: Christine A. Iacobuzio-Donahue

Publication details
- Former names: Journal of Cancer Research, American Journal of Cancer
- History: 1916–present
- Publisher: American Association for Cancer Research (United States)
- Frequency: Biweekly
- Impact factor: 22.6 (2025)

Standard abbreviations
- ISO 4: Cancer Res.

Indexing
- CODEN: CNREA8
- ISSN: 0008-5472 (print); 1538-7445 (web)
- LCCN: 44002733
- OCLC no.: 1553285

Links
- Journal homepage; Online access; Online archive

Cancer Research is a biweekly peer-reviewed medical journal published by the American Association for Cancer Research. It covers research on all aspects of cancer and cancer-related biomedical sciences and was established in 1941. The editor-in-chief is Christine A. Iacobuzio-Donahue.

The journal was established in 1916 as the Journal of Cancer Research, was renamed American Journal of Cancer in 1931, and obtained its current name in 1941.

== Abstracting and indexing ==
The journal is abstracted and indexed in:

- Biological Abstracts
- BIOSIS Previews
- Chemical Abstracts
- Current Contents/Life Sciences
- Current Contents/Clinical Medicine
- Index Medicus/MEDLINE/PubMed
- Science Citation Index
- Scopus

According to the Journal Citation Reports, the journal has a 2025 impact factor of 22.6.
