= Raymond DuBois (academic) =

American academic and scientist

Raymond N. DuBois
- Education: Texas A&M University
- Scientific career
- Fields: Biochemistry medicine and molecular biology
- Workplaces: Vanderbilt-Ingram Cancer Center; University of Texas MD Anderson Cancer Center; Biodesign Institute

Raymond N. DuBois M.D., Ph.D. is an American academic and physician-scientist. He is currently the director of Hollings Cancer Center at the Medical University of South Carolina in Charleston, South Carolina and executive chairman of the board of the Mark Foundation for Cancer Research. He is renowned for his work in cancer prevention and interception, studying molecular mechanisms that interrupt the process of premalignant cells becoming malignant.

== Early life and education ==
DuBois attended Texas A&M University, where he received a bachelor's degree in biochemistry. Later, he joined a medical school, University of Texas School of Medicine, and completed a medical degree. He also holds a doctorate degree in biochemistry from the University of Texas.

== Career ==
From 1991 to 2007, he was the director of the Vanderbilt-Ingram Cancer Center.

Between 2007 and 2012, DuBois was the provost and executive vice president of the University of Texas MD Anderson Cancer Center. He also held the Ellen Knisely Distinguished Chair in colon cancer research.

In 2012, he joined the Biodesign Institute at Arizona State University as the executive director and served until 2016.

In March 2016, DuBois became the dean of the College of Medicine at the Medical University of South Carolina.

In 2019, he was elected to the National Academy of Medicine.

In 2020, he was appointed as the director of Hollings Cancer Center.

In February 2022, he was appointed as the executive chairman of the board of Mark Foundation for Cancer Research.

== Research ==
DuBois is known for his research on the causes of cancer, its spread, and what prevents it.

DuBois co-invented a method for identifying and targeting cellular genes required for viral development, as well as cellular genes that act as tumour suppressors in mammals.

== Awards and recognition ==
- Howard Hughes Research Associate Award (1988)
- Elected member, American Society for Clinical Investigation (1997)
- Elected member, Association of American Physicians (2000)
- E.V. Newman Research Prize (2000)
- AACR-Richard and Hinda Rosenthal Cancer Foundation Award (2002)
- NIH MERIT Award, NIDDK (2004–2012)
- Dorothy P. Landon-AACR Cancer Research Prize (2004)
- Fellow of the American Association for the Advancement of Science (2004)
- AGA Distinguished Achievement Award (2004)
- Anthony Dipple Carcinogenesis Award from Oxford University Press (2006)
- Elected, Johns Hopkins University Society of Scholars (2007)
- Catedra Gonzalo Rio Arronte Award, Mexico City, Mexico (2011)
- The Shanghai Cancer Forum Award (2013)
- Elected fellow, American Association for Cancer Research (2013)
- Elected, American Clinical and Climatological Association (2013)
- AACR Margaret Foti Award for Leadership and Extraordinary Achievements in Cancer Research (2019)
- Elected, National Academy of Medicine (2019)
- Fellow of the Royal College of Physicians (2020)
- AACR Distinguished Service Award (2022)

== Bibliography ==
- DuBios, Raymond N. (2003). Cox-2: A New Target for Cancer Prevention and Treatment
