= Lustgarten Foundation for Pancreatic Cancer Research =

U.S. non-profit organization

The Lustgarten Foundation is a 501(c)(3) non-profit organization foundation dedicated to advancing the research related to the diagnosis, treatment, cure and prevention of pancreatic cancer while raising public awareness and providing support to patients and their families. The Foundation is the largest private funder of pancreatic cancer research in the world.

== Mission ==
Based in Woodbury, Nassau County, New York, the Foundation's mission is to cure pancreatic cancer by funding scientific and clinical research related to the diagnosis, treatment, and prevention of pancreatic cancer; providing research information and clinical support services to patients, caregivers and individuals at high risk; and increasing public awareness and hope for those dealing with this disease. Increasing funding and support of research into the biological mechanisms and clinical strategies related to the prevention, diagnosis, and treatment of pancreatic cancer; Facilitating and enhancing the dialogue among members of the medical and scientific communities about basic and clinical research efforts that relate to pancreatic cancer; Heightening public awareness of pancreatic cancer diagnosis, treatment, and prevention and providing informational support for pancreatic cancer patients, their families, and friends.

A primary method for advocacy and gathering donations involves runs/walks and other events at a regional level. The Lustgarten Foundation has raised more than $16.1 million for pancreatic cancer research as of 2012.

== Members ==
The Foundation fostered the collaborative effort known as the Pancreatic Cancer Research Consortium, in 2010, which comprises six leading medical institutions across the United States. Its members are the Cold Spring Harbor Laboratory, Dana–Farber Cancer Institute in affiliation with Harvard Medical School, Johns Hopkins University School of Medicine, The David H. Koch Institute for Integrative Cancer Research at MIT, Memorial Sloan-Kettering Cancer Center, and The University of Texas M.D. Anderson Cancer Center.

== Naming ==
The Lustgarten Foundation is named after Marc Lustgarten, a former Cablevision executive, who died at the age of 52 from pancreatic cancer.

== History ==
At the time the Lustgarten Foundation was established, pancreatic cancer was an orphan disease, with less than one half of one percent of the total National Cancer Institute's budget supporting fewer than 15 researchers nationally. Because funding was so limited, it was difficult to find researchers to study the disease. However, recognizing that research follows dollars, in 2000, the Foundation awarded ten $100,000 grants totaling $1 million to stimulate pancreatic cancer research for leading physician scientists, many of whom continue to dedicate their careers to pancreatic cancer today.

== Financials ==
Thanks to a commitment from Cablevision to underwrite all of The Lustgarten Foundation's administrative expenses, 100% of every donation received goes directly to pancreatic cancer research. The Lustgarten Foundation is a 4-Star charity on Charity Navigator, ranking at the highest level for its organizational and financial transparency, low administrative costs, board, and growth.
