= Cancer Discovery (journal) =

- Discipline: Oncology
- Language: English
- Edited by: Lewis C. Cantley, Luis A. Diaz

Publication details
- History: 2011–present
- Publisher: American Association for Cancer Research (United States)
- Frequency: Monthly
- Open access: Hybrid
- Impact factor: 39.397 (2020)

Standard abbreviations
- ISO 4: Cancer Discov.

Indexing
- ISSN: 2159-8290
- LCCN: 2011204352
- OCLC no.: 1073154761

Links
- Journal homepage; Online access; Online archive

Cancer Discovery is a monthly peer-reviewed medical journal published by the American Association for Cancer Research. It covers research and clinical trials related to the study of cancer. The editors-in-chief are Lewis C. Cantley and Luis A. Diaz. The journal was established in 2011.

== Abstracting and indexing ==
The journal is abstracted and indexed in:

- Biological Abstracts
- BIOSIS Previews
- Embase
- Index Medicus/MEDLINE/PubMed
- Science Citation Index Expanded
- Scopus

According to the Journal Citation Reports, the journal has a 2020 impact factor of 39.397.
