= Vanderbilt University School of Medicine =

Medical school in Nashville, Tennessee, US

- Type: Private university
- Established: 1875
- Parent institution: Vanderbilt University
- Dean: Jeff Balser
- Faculty: 2,718 (1,630 full-time, 996 part-time/voluntary, and 92 emeritus)
- Students: 607 Total
- Location: Nashville, Tennessee, U.S. 36.144°N 86.801°W
- Campus: Urban
- Website: medschool.vanderbilt.edu

Vanderbilt University School of Medicine (VUSM) is the graduate medical school of Vanderbilt University, a private research university located in Nashville, Tennessee, United States. The School of Medicine is primarily housed within the Eskind Biomedical Library which sits at the intersection of the Vanderbilt University and Vanderbilt University Medical Center (VUMC) campuses and claims several Nobel laureates in the field of medicine.

Through the Vanderbilt Health Affiliated Network, VUSM is affiliated with over 60 hospitals and 5,000 clinicians across Tennessee and five neighboring states which manage more than 2 million patient visits each year. As the home hospital of the medical school, VUMC is considered one of the largest academic medical centers in the United States and is the primary resource for specialty and primary care in hundreds of adult and pediatric specialties for patients throughout the Mid-South.

== History ==
The Vanderbilt University School of Medicine was founded in 1851 as the school of medicine at the University of Nashville and only became affiliated with Vanderbilt University in 1874. The first degrees issued by Vanderbilt University were to 61 Doctors of Medicine in February 1875, thanks to an arrangement that recognized the University of Nashville's medical school as serving both institutions. The arrangement continued for 20 more years, until the school was reorganized under the control of the Vanderbilt Board of Trustees. In the early days, the School of Medicine was owned and operated as a private property of the practicing physicians who composed the faculty and received the fees paid by students. At this time, the course of medical instruction consisted of just three years of schooling, which was extended to four years starting in 1898. Vanderbilt University made no financial contribution to the school's support and exercised no control over admission requirements, the curriculum, or standards for graduation. In 1925, the school moved from the old South Campus across town to the main campus, thus integrating instruction in the medical sciences with the rest of the university.

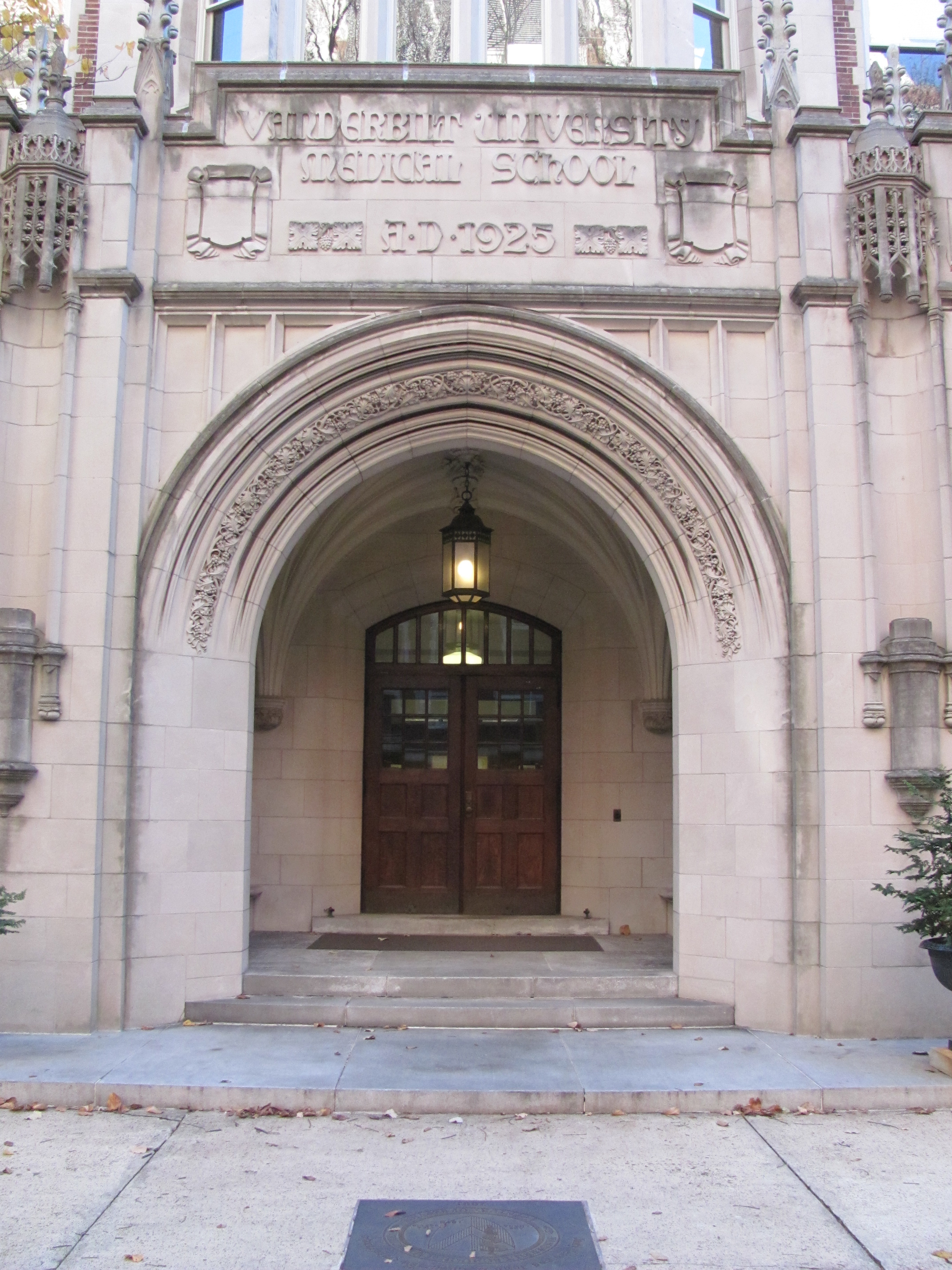
Historical entrance to VUSM, used prior to its intra-campus relocation from Medical Center North (pictured) to the nearby Eskind Biomedical Library

The school changed fundamentally during the next decades. The new medical campus finally brought together the School of Medicine, its hospital, the outpatient clinics, laboratory space, and medical library into one location. The move also put the school adjacent to the Vanderbilt University School of Nursing, which had been founded in 1909. Other internal developments included the establishment of a department of Pediatrics (1928) and a department of Radiology (1936) and the acquisition of one of the school's first large research grants, a $250,000 award from the Rockefeller Foundation in 1932. The research happening at Vanderbilt during this time included advancements that had far-reaching implications for the practice of medicine. Alfred Blalock and Vivien Thomas conducted research into blue baby syndrome that led to their 1933 medical-first neonatal cardiothoracic surgery, which formed the basis for the development of the Blalock–Taussig shunt, a life-saving procedure for infants with the Tetralogy of Fallot. And in the early 1940s, the process for culturing vaccines in chick embryos was developed by Vanderbilt's Ernest William Goodpasture, a feat that allowed for the mass production of vaccines for diseases like yellow fever, smallpox, and typhus. During the latter half of the 20th century, there was a further expansion of the school's clinical mission and research achievements. The school established a formal department of Anesthesiology in 1945 to build on the school's already significant commitment to the use of anesthetics during procedures, which had its roots in the development of the first ether-oxygen apparatus in 1907 by Vanderbilt's James Gwathmey. The research at the school received a boost with the founding of a federally-funded Clinical Research Center in 1960. The services that the school and medical center provided for children grew tremendously with the start of a department of Neonatology and the world's first neonatal intensive care unit in 1961, led by Mildred T. Stahlman, and the Vanderbilt Children's Hospital, which opened its doors in 1970. The research at the school of medicine also garnered two Nobel prizes during this time, with the 1971 Nobel Prize in Physiology or Medicine going to Earl Wilbur Sutherland Jr. for his work on cyclic AMP and Stanley Cohen sharing in the 1986 Nobel Prize for Physiology or Medicine for his work on growth factors.

In March 2014, the institution was being sued by the federal government in a whistle-blower case for a decade-long Medicare fraud scheme. In May 2015, a federal court ruled that the Vanderbilt University Medical Center was in violation of the Worker Adjustment and Retraining Notification (WARN) Act for laying off 200 employees without adequate notice and would have to pay out $400,000, pending an appeal.

In November 2014, the university admitted that one of its scientists fraudulently falsified six years of biomedical research in high-profile journals. The scientist, Igor Dzhura, was a senior research associate hired by Vanderbilt University's Department of Biomedical Engineering. His research was published in Nature Cell Biology, The Journal of Physiology, Circulation, and The FASEB Journal, in 2000-2005; it was cited "more than 500 times."

While Vanderbilt University owned and operated the Vanderbilt University Medical Center (VUMC) that serves the medical school for much of its history, in 2016 the hospitals and clinics of the medical center were incorporated into a new entity which operates independent of Vanderbilt University's control. This organization, also called the Vanderbilt University Medical Center, is clinically and academically affiliated with Vanderbilt University.

== Academics ==
Vanderbilt University School of Medicine ranks 5th among the nation's elite programs, according to U.S. News & World Report's annual ranking of top medical schools for research, released in the 2023 edition of America's Best Graduate Schools. Vanderbilt University School of Medicine also ranks 82nd in the top medical schools for primary care. Vanderbilt University School of Medicine also ranks No. 8 in the nation among U.S. medical schools in total grant support provided through the National Institutes of Health (NIH). The new ranking raises VUSM's standing two spots from the No. 10 position it held last year. Among VUSM's basic science departments, Biochemistry ranks third; Cell and Developmental Biology, first; Molecular Physiology & Biophysics, third; and Pharmacology, sixth. Six clinical departments ranked among the top 10, including: Internal Medicine, third; Ophthalmology, ninth; Otolaryngology and Hearing & Speech Sciences, sixth; Pediatrics, fourth; Radiology & Radiologic Sciences, eighth; and Surgery, eighth.

== Medical Center ==
The Vanderbilt University Medical Center is the only Level I Trauma Center in Middle Tennessee. The trauma center serves a large geographic area stretching from Southern Kentucky to Northern Alabama in what amounts to a 65,000-square-mile catchment area. A part of Vanderbilt Health, VUMC has 834 licensed beds between Vanderbilt University Hospital, Vanderbilt Psychiatric Hospital and Vanderbilt Stallworth Rehabilitation Hospital. According to U.S. News & World Report's 2015-16 rankings, VUMC is the No. 1 hospital in the Nashville metro area and in Tennessee overall. The following units comprise VUMC:

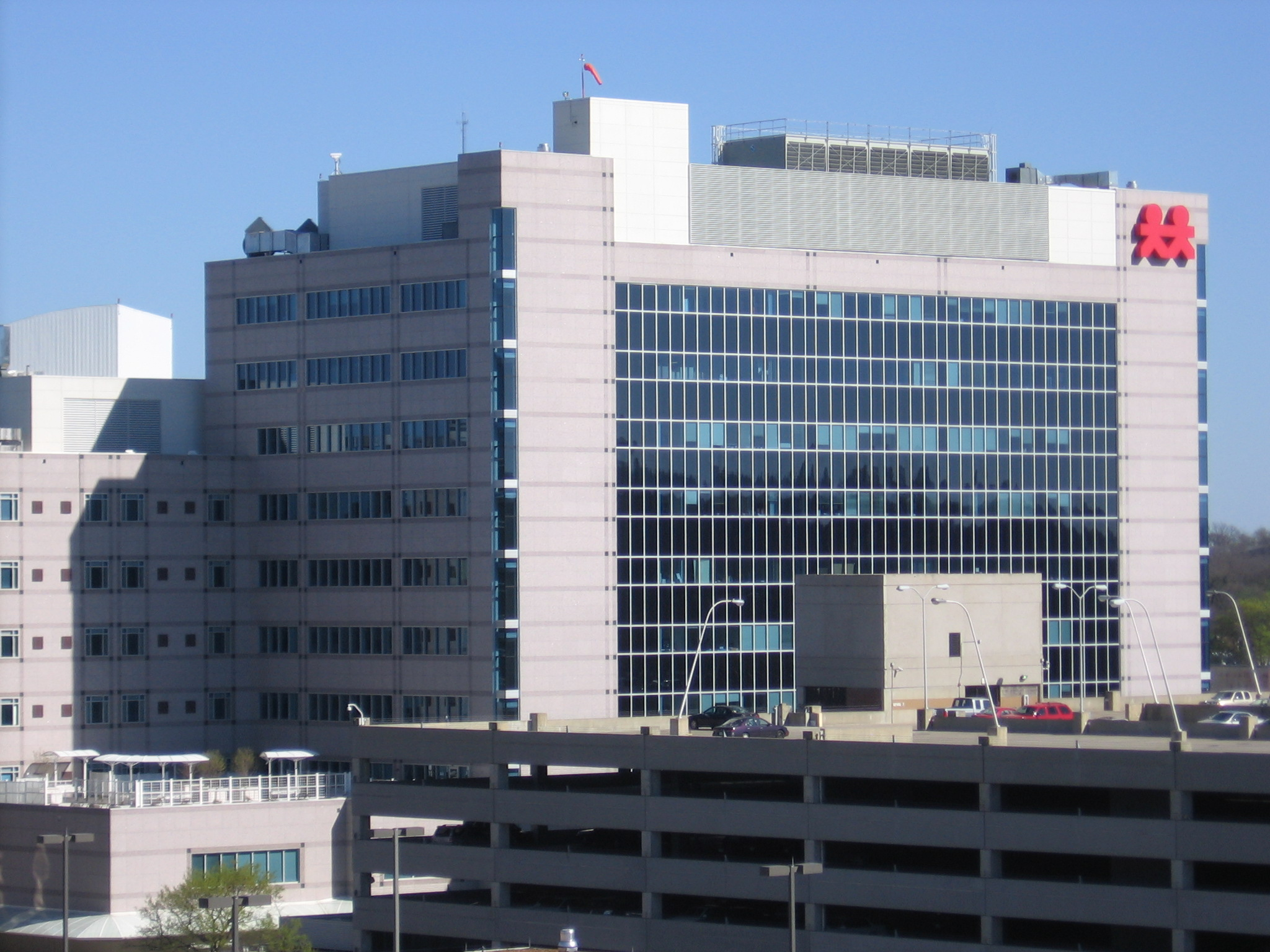
The 11-story Doctor's Office Tower of the Monroe Carell Jr. Children's Hospital at Vanderbilt, which was completed in 2004.

- Vanderbilt University Hospital
- Monroe Carell Jr. Children's Hospital at Vanderbilt
- Vanderbilt-Ingram Cancer Center
- The Vanderbilt Clinic
- Vanderbilt Bill Wilkerson Center
- Vanderbilt Stallworth Rehabilitation Hospital
- Vanderbilt Psychiatric Hospital
- Eskind Biomedical Library
- Vanderbilt Sports Medicine
- Dayani Human Performance Center
- Vanderbilt Page Campbell Heart Institute
- Vanderbilt University School of Medicine
- Vanderbilt University School of Nursing

With over 21,500 employees (including 2,876 full-time faculty), Vanderbilt is the largest private employer in Middle Tennessee and the second largest in the state (after FedEx, headquartered in Memphis). Approximately 74% of the university's faculty and staff are employed by the Medical Center.

== Degrees awarded ==
As of 2022, the Vanderbilt University School of Medicine offers 10 single professional degrees:

- Master of Education of the Deaf (MDE)
- Master of Genetic Counseling (MGC)
- Master of Public Health (MPH)
- Master of Science in Clinical Investigation (MSCI)
- Master of Science in Medical Physics (MSMP)
- Master of Science - Applied Clinical Informatics (MS-ACI)
- Master of Science - Speech-Language Pathology (MS-SLP)
- Doctor of Audiology (AuD)
- Doctor of Medical Physics (DMP)
- Doctor of Medicine (MD)

Also as of 2022, the school offers the following dual degree programs:

- M.D./Ph.D. through a Medical Scientist Training Program (MSTP)
- M.D./M.P.H.
- M.D./MBA

The school also offers a Medical Innovators Development Program (MIDP), which is an M.D. track tailored to students interested in medical innovation and design.

The School of Medicine will add a new degree program, a Master of Imaging Science, in the 2023-24 academic year.

== Notable alumni ==
James Tayloe Gwathmey, MD 1899, hailed as the "Father of Modern Anesthesia," with Charles Baskerville

- Jean R. Anderson, MD 1986 – internationally recognized obstetrician and gynaecologist, founder and first director of the Johns Hopkins Hospital HIV Women's Health Program (1991)
- Jeff Balser, MD 1990 - President and CEO of Vanderbilt University Medical Center and dean of the School of Medicine
- Nathaniel Barrett, MD 1886 – American physician and politician
- Humphrey Bate, MD 1898 – American physician and musician who served as a surgeon in the Spanish–American War (1898)
- Eugene Lindsay Bishop, MD 1914 – Commissioner for the Tennessee State Health Department, Lasker Award
- Daniel Blain, MD 1929 – first Medical Director of the American Psychiatric Association (APA)
- Ogden Bruton, MD 1933 - made significant advances in immunology, discovered Bruton-type agammaglobulinemia, namesake of Bruton's tyrosine kinase
- Michael Burry, MD 1997 – founder of the Scion Capital LLC hedge fund, portrayed by Christian Bale in the 2015 film The Big Short
- Thomas C. Butler, MD 1967 – scientist specializing in infectious diseases including cholera and bubonic plague, credited with making oral hydration the standard treatment for diarrhea
- David Charles, MD 1990 – neurologist, Chief Medical Officer of the Vanderbilt Neuroscience Institute, Director of Telemedicine at Vanderbilt University Medical Center.
- Alice Drew Chenoweth, MD 1932 – physician who specialized in pediatrics and public health, served as the Chief of the Division of Health Services in the United States Children's Bureau
- Kathleen R. Cho, MD 1984 – professor of pathology and internal medicine at Michigan Medicine, National Academy of Medicine
- Stanley Cohen – biochemist; co-discovered epidermal growth factor
- Robert D. Collins, MD 1951 – American physician and pathologist who established the Lukes–Collins scheme for pathologic classification of lymphoma
- Ed Connor, MS 1982 – neuroscientist who has made important contributions to the neuroscience of object synthesis in higher-level visual cortex, Professor of Neuroscience at Johns Hopkins University
- Francis M. Fesmire, MD 1985 – emergency physician and nationally recognized expert in myocardial infarction
- Don Flickinger, MD 1934 – US Air Force Brigadier General, aerospace medicine pioneer; commander, Air Force Office of Scientific Research, Distinguished Service Medal
- Agnes Fogo, MD – professor of renal pathology at the Vanderbilt University Medical Center, 2019 Roscoe R. Robinson Award
- John E. Fryer, MD 1962 – Activist whose speech at the American Psychiatric Association was a key factor in the de-listing of homosexuality as a mental illness from the Diagnostic and Statistical Manual of Mental Disorders
- John W. Gaines, MD 1882 – United States House of Representatives for Tennessee (1897–1909)
- J. Donald M. Gass, MD 1957 – Canadian-American ophthalmologist, one of the world's leading specialists on diseases of the retina, first to describe many macular diseases
- Antonio Gotto, MD 1965 – physician scientist; expert in the field of lipid diseases and former dean of Weill Cornell Medicine
- James Tayloe Gwathmey, MD 1899 – anesthesiologist; first president of the American Association of Anesthetics and co-author of Anesthesia, the first medical textbook on the subject
- Charles Robert Hager, MD 1894 - Swiss-American missionary, founder of the China Congregational Church in Hong Kong, baptized Sun Yat-sen, first President of the Republic of China
- Richard Hatchett, MD 1995 – CEO of Coalition for Epidemic Preparedness Innovations, Health and Human Services Distinguished Service Award
- Patrick Ho JP, MD 1976 - former Professor of Surgery (Ophthalmology) at the Chinese University of Hong Kong, former Secretary for Home Affairs, Hong Kong
- Dorothy M. Horstmann – American epidemiologist, virologist and pediatrician whose research on the spread of poliovirus in the human bloodstream helped set the stage for the development of the polio vaccine
- Kung Hsiang-fu, PhD 1969 – Chinese geneticist and oncologist, former Director of the University of Hong Kong's Institute of Molecular Biology, Chinese Academy of Sciences
- Walter Russell Lambuth, MD 1877 – missionary and physician; founder of Soochow Hospital in China
- Louis Lowenstein, MD - medical researcher who made significant contributions in hematology and immunology
- G. Patrick Maxwell, MD – plastic surgeon, first successful report of microsurgical transfer of the latissimus muscle flap at Johns Hopkins University, advanced the design of tissue expanders used for breast reconstruction
- Merrill Moore, MD 1928 – psychiatrist, Harvard Medical School professor, and poet.
- Harold L. Moses, MD 1962 – Ingram Professor of Cancer Research, Professor of Cancer Biology, Medicine and Pathology, and Director Emeritus at the Vanderbilt-Ingram Cancer Center, president of the American Association for Cancer Research (1991)
- George C. Nichopoulos, MD 1959 – American physician best known as Elvis Presley's personal physician
- Lee E. Payne, MD 1983 – United States Air Force, former Command Surgeon of the Air Mobility Command, Distinguished Service Medal
- Stuart C. Ray, MD 1990 – Vice Chair of Medicine for Data Integrity and Analytics, Associate Director of the Infectious Diseases Fellowship Training Program at the Johns Hopkins School of Medicine
- Sanford Rosenthal, MD 1920 – pioneered liver function tests, discovered rongalite as the antidote for mercury poisoning, discovered an antibiotic cure for pneumococcal pneumonia, Public Health Service Meritorious Service Medal (1962)
- Samuel Santoro, MD 1979 - pioneering researcher in the structure of integrin adhesive receptors for extracellular matrix proteins, Chair of the Department of Pathology, Microbiology and Immunology at Vanderbilt
- Robert Taylor Segraves, MD 1971 - American psychiatrist best known for his work on sexual dysfunction and its pharmacologic causes and treatments
- Norman Shumway, MD 1949 – 67th president of the American Association for Thoracic Surgery and the first to perform a successful heart transplant in the United States
- John Abner Snell, MD 1908 – medical missionary and superintendent of Soochow Hospital, China
- Sophie Spitz, MD 1932 – pathologist who published the first case series of a special form of benign melanocytic nevi that have come to be known as Spitz nevi
- Mildred T. Stahlman, MD 1946 – Professor of pediatrics and pathology; founded first Neonatal Intensive Care Unit (NICU) in the world
- J. William Stokes, MD 1888 – United States House of Representatives for South Carolina (1896–1901)
- Earl Wilbur Sutherland Jr. – pharmacologist and biochemist; discovered the second messenger molecule cyclic-AMP
- Ghanshyam Swarup, Indian molecular biologist known for his studies on glaucoma and the discovery of protein tyrosine phosphatase, Shanti Swarup Bhatnagar laureate
- Carol Tamminga, MD 1971 – American psychiatrist and neuroscientist focusing in schizophrenia, psychotic bipolar disorder, and schizoaffective disorder, National Academy of Medicine fellow
- Robert V. Tauxe, MD – Director of the Division of Foodborne, Waterborne and Environmental Diseases of the Centers for Disease Control and Prevention
- Rhonda Voskuhl, MD – physician and research scientist, Brain Research Institute (BRI) at the David Geffen School of Medicine at UCLA, principal investigator for treatment trials for multiple sclerosis (MS)
- Levi Watkins, MD 1970 – pioneer in cardiac surgery; co-invented the automatic implantable defibrillator
- Sheldon M. Wolff, MD 1957 – former Chair of the Department of Medicine at Tufts University and Clinical Director of the National Institute of Allergy and Infectious Diseases
