= Eugene Anderson =

Eugene Anderson may refer to:

- Eugene Anderson (lawyer) (1927–2010), American trial lawyer
- Eugene Anderson (politician) (born 1944), Kansas state legislator
- E. N. Anderson (born 1941), American professor of anthropology
- Gene Anderson (wrestler) (1939–1991), American professional wrestler
- Gene Anderson (basketball) (1917–1999), American professional basketball player

== See also ==
- Gene Anderson (disambiguation)
- Jean Anderson (disambiguation)
- Eugenie Anderson (1909–1997), United States diplomat
