= Honey Creek, Wisconsin =

Honey Creek, Wisconsin, may refer to:

- Honey Creek, Sauk County, Wisconsin, a town in Sauk County
- Honey Creek, Walworth County, Wisconsin, an unincorporated community
- Honey Creek (Wisconsin River tributary), a natural watercourse Sauk County
- Honey Creek (Fox River tributary in Wisconsin), natural watercourse in Racine and Walworth Counties
