= Cyrus Leland =

American politician

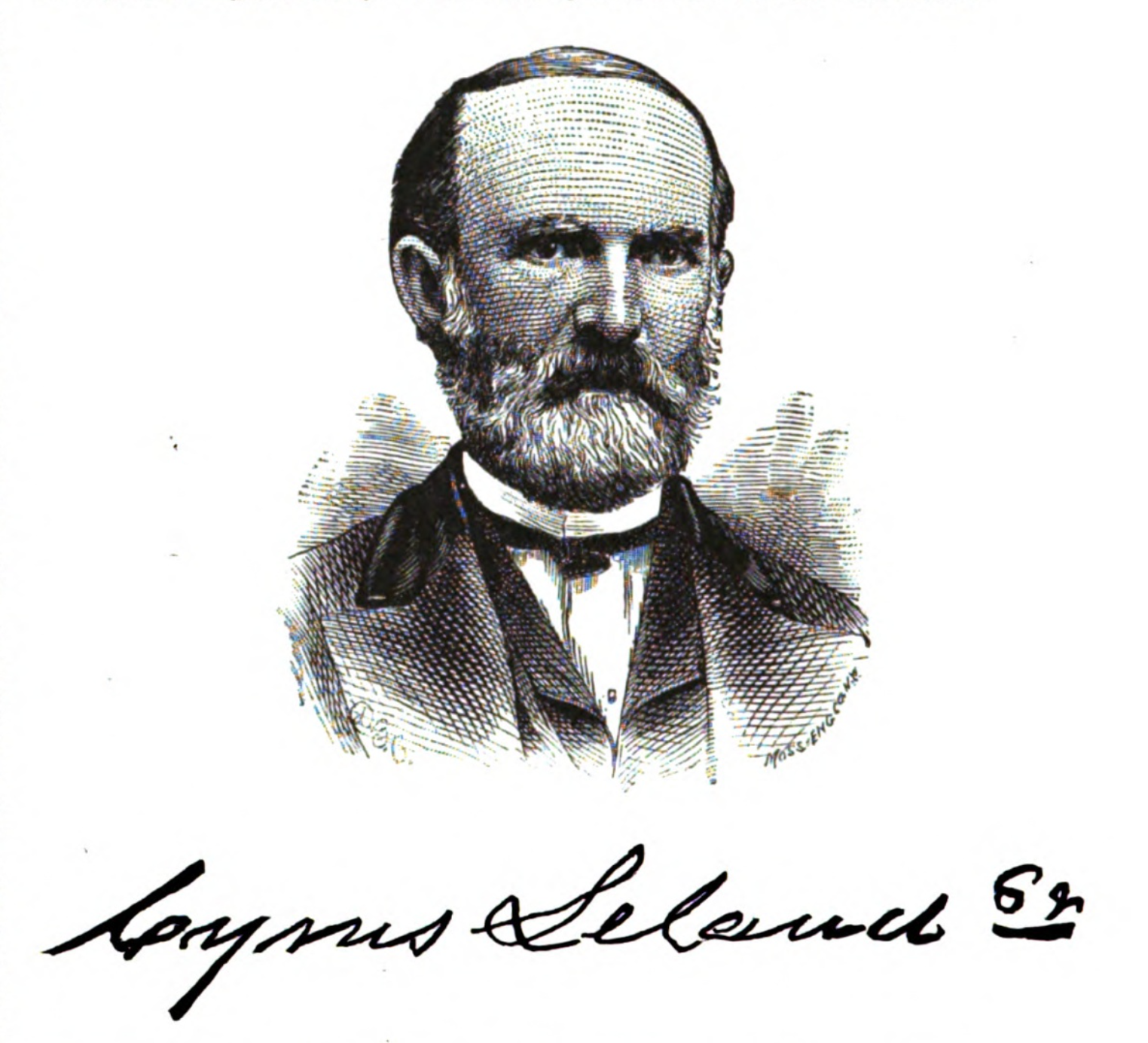
Engraving of Cyrus Leland Sr, Wisconsin politician and American Civil War colonel

Cyrus Leland Sr. (September 9, 1810 – June 4, 1890) was a lawyer from Sauk City, Wisconsin and Troy, Kansas who served a single one-year term in the Wisconsin State Assembly representing Sauk County as a Democrat; and served as a colonel in the Union Army during the American Civil War.

== Background ==
Leland was born September 9, 1810, in Grafton, Massachusetts, son of Cyrus and Betsy (Kimball) Leland. He studied at Leicester Academy and Amherst before his freshman year at Harvard, from which he was graduated in 1832. He read the law in the Worcester law firm of former governor John Davis and future governor Emory Washburn, and moved to Peoria, Illinois, where he was admitted to the bar and began the practice of law. In 1835 he was appointed a justice of the peace, and married Sarah Ann Howard.

In the summer of 1839, Leland and Sarah moved to Prairie du Sac in the Wisconsin Territory with their daughter, farming and conducting mercantile business. In 1843 he built a sawmill in the nearby Town of Honey Creek, around which a settlement coalesced which was dubbed Leland, Wisconsin in his honor. (It would continue to exist into the 21st century.) After two years, the family moved to Sauk City, where he would resume a legal practice.

== Public office in Wisconsin ==
In 1840, he served as postmaster in Prairie du Sac. When Sauk County had its first election in 1844, Leland was elected as a school commissioner (equivalent to a school board member) and as a justice of the peace. In 1848, he was elected to the Assembly from Sauk County for the 1849 session (2nd Wisconsin Legislature), to succeed Delando Pratt (a fellow Democrat). When he took office in the Assembly in January 1849, he was reported as being 38 years old, from Massachusetts, and having been in Wisconsin nine years.

In the spring of 1849 he was elected town clerk of the newly created Township of Prairie du Sac. He was succeeded in the Assembly by Caleb Crosswell (another Democrat). In November 1850, he became a county supervisor and chaired the county board. During this time he also served as paymaster and colonel in the state militia.

== After Wisconsin ==
In 1857 he moved to Kansas Territory and actively participated in the Bleeding Kansas disputes as a Free-Stater. In 1858 he settled in Troy, Kansas and opened a law office; he was appointed postmaster and notary public. Upon the outbreak of the Civil War in 1861 he was made a colonel in the State Militia, and in August was sent on active duty in command of his regiment along the Missouri frontier until January 20, 1862, when they were discharged. He would spend the remainder of the war in various roles, from recruiting what would become the 13th Kansas Infantry Regiment, to quartermaster and often commissary of this and other units in Arkansas and the Indian Territory. He was injured by musket balls on the head and neck in the spring of 1864 at the Battle of Marks' Mills but was not captured like so many Union troops. He continued to serve until honorably discharged in July 1865 at Little Rock, Arkansas at the end of his term of enlistment. After the end of the war "Colonel Leland" retired to his farm in Doniphan County, of which Troy is the county seat.

== Family life ==
His first wife Sarah Ann died December 13, 1874; they had had two sons and four daughters who lived. In 1876 Leland married Chloe M. Smith Tennent, who had been widowed in 1873. He died June 4, 1890, in Troy, and is buried in Mount Olive Cemetery there. Chloe would live until March 25, 1902. She and Sarah Ann are also buried in Mount Olive, as are a number of their relatives. Cyrus Leland Jr., born to Sarah Ann in 1841, followed them to Kansas in 1858. He would be a lieutenant in the Union Army, and would serve multiple terms in the Kansas Legislature, and as a member of the Republican National Committee.
