= Jean Anderson (disambiguation) =

Jean Anderson (1907–2001) was an English actress.

Jean Anderson may also refer to:

- Jean Anderson (golfer) (1921–1984), Scottish golfer
- Jean Anderson (musician) (1923–2020), New Zealand pianist and professor of music
- Jean Anderson (cookbook author) (1929–2023), American cookbook author
- Jean Anderson (dancer) (1939–1985), Canadian dancer
- Jean R. Anderson (born 1953), obstetrician and gynaecologist

== See also ==
- Jean Andersen (born 1988), South African tennis player
- Gene Anderson (disambiguation)
