= Jeff Balser =

American academic

- Born: Jeffrey R. Balser; 1962 (age 63–64); Indianapolis, Indiana, U.S.
- Education: Tulane University (BS); Vanderbilt University (MD, PhD)
- Occupations: Dean of the Vanderbilt University School of Medicine; (2008 – 2026); President and CEO of Vanderbilt University Medical Center; (2016 – 2026); Vice chancellor for health affairs at Vanderbilt University; (2008 – 2016)

Jeffrey R. Balser (born in 1962) is the president and CEO of Vanderbilt University Medical Center (VUMC) and dean of Vanderbilt University School of Medicine (VUSM). Balser is a 1990 graduate of the Vanderbilt M.D./Ph.D. program in pharmacology and subsequently completed residency training in anesthesiology and fellowship training in critical care medicine at Johns Hopkins. He continued to work at Johns Hopkins as a cardiac anesthesiologist and ICU physician before returning to Vanderbilt University and joining VUMC in 1998.

Balser was appointed dean of VUSM in 2008 and, the following year, was appointed the vice chancellor for health affairs at Vanderbilt, in charge of the medical center. He became president and CEO of VUMC in 2016 when the medical center became a financially distinct non-profit organization. After 18 years leading the medical center, he announced his retirement for the end of 2026.

== Early life and education ==
Balser was born in Indianapolis, Indiana, in 1962. While in middle school student, he sold newspapers in a hospital, going from room to room interacting with patients. His interest in medicine developed after the death of his mother from pancreatic cancer. Balser was dissatisfied with the health care system which he saw as disorganized and frustrating.

In 1984, he graduated from Tulane University, where he majored in engineering, prior to attending Vanderbilt University School of Medicine (VUSM). He graduated from medical school in 1990 having earned dual degrees, an M.D. and a Ph.D. in pharmacology. He completed residency training in anesthesiology and fellowship training in cardiac anesthesiology and critical care medicine at Johns Hopkins Hospital in Baltimore, Maryland.

== Career ==
In 1995, Balser began working for Johns Hopkins as a cardiac anesthesiologist and ICU physician. He led research, funded by the National Institutes of Health, into the genomics of cardiac rhythm disorders, including sudden cardiac death.

He joined Vanderbilt University Medical Center (VUMC) in 1998 as the associate dean for physician scientists. In 2001, he was appointed the James Tayloe Gwathmey Professor and Chair of Anesthesiology and was also elected as a member of the American Society for Clinical Investigation. Balser then became Vanderbilt's associate vice chancellor for research in 2004 and was responsible for translational and clinical research at VUMC.

In 2008, he was elected as a member of the National Academy of Medicine. Later that year, Balser was appointed as the eleventh dean of VUSM. The following year, he was made vice chancellor for health affairs at Vanderbilt University, in charge of the medical center, while continuing to serve as dean of the medical school. In 2011, Balser was implicated as one of the chief proponents behind a medical record system at Vanderbilt University Medical Center that was involved in "widespread Medicare fraud for more than a decade. The medical center later settled with the federal government for $6.5 million.

In 2014, Vanderbilt University Medical Center began a restructuring process to become a financially distinct non-profit organization with the medical school being part of both the medical center and Vanderbilt University. When the restructuring process was completed in April 2016, Balser remained head of both the medical center with a new title of president and CEO of Vanderbilt University Medical Center, while remaining dean of the Vanderbilt University School of Medicine, until his retirement December 2026. In July 2015, he was appointed to serve on the board of directors at his alma mater, Tulane University.

== Personal life ==
Balser met his wife Melinda while they were freshmen at Tulane. They were married on July 20, 1985, at the end of his first year of medical school. They have three children.

== Selected publications ==
- Petersen, Christina I.; McFarland, Toni R.; Stepanovic, Svetlana Z.; Yang, Ping; Reiner, David J.; Hayashi, Kenshi; George, Alfred L.; Roden, Dan M.; et al. (2004). "In vivo identification of genes that modify ether-a-go-go-related gene activity in Caenorhabditis elegans may also affect human cardiac arrhythmia". Proceedings of the National Academy of Sciences. 101 (32): 11773–8. Bibcode:2004PNAS..10111773P. doi:10.1073/pnas.0306005101. PMC 511051. PMID 15280551.
- Tan, Hanno L.; Kupershmidt, Sabina; Zhang, Rong; Stepanovic, Svetlana; Roden, Dan M.; Wilde, Arthur A. M.; Anderson, Mark E.; Balser, Jeffrey R. (2002). "A calcium sensor in the sodium channel modulates cardiac excitability". Nature. 415 (6870): 442–7. Bibcode:2002Natur.415..442T. doi:10.1038/415442a. PMID 11807557. S2CID 4414231.
- Schwinn, Debra A.; Balser, Jeffrey R. (2006). "Anesthesiology physician scientists in academic medicine: a wake-up call". Anesthesiology. 104 (1): 170–8. doi:10.1097/00000542-200601000-00023. PMC 2322866. PMID 16394703.
- Wingo, Tammy L; Shah, Vikas N; Anderson, Mark E; Lybrand, Terry P; Chazin, Walter J; Balser, Jeffrey R (2004). "An EF-hand in the sodium channel couples intracellular calcium to cardiac excitability". Nature Structural & Molecular Biology. 11 (3): 219–25. doi:10.1038/nsmb737. PMID 14981509. S2CID 6021469.
- Balser, Jeffrey R.; Baruchin, Andrea (2008). "Science at the Interstices: An Evolution in the Academy". Academic Medicine. 83 (9): 827–31. doi:10.1097/ACM.0b013e318181d1ed. PMID 18728436.
