= Sandra F. Simmons =

Medical researcher

Academic background
- Education: B.A., Psychology, M.A., Clinical Psychology, 1991, Middle Tennessee State University; PhD, Gerontology & Clinical Psychology, 1998, Pennsylvania State University
- Thesis: Criteria to identify nursing home residents capable of accurate self-report: implications for the measurement and improvement of care quality. (1998)

Sandra F. Simmons is an American clinical psychologist and gerontologist. She is the Joe C. Davis Endowed Chair in Biomedical Science at Vanderbilt University and the director of the Vanderbilt Center for Quality Aging.

== Early life and education ==
Simmons earned her Bachelor of Arts and Master's degree from Middle Tennessee State University before receiving her PhD from Pennsylvania State University.

== Career ==
Upon earning her PhD, Simmons worked as an associate professor of medicine at the University of California, Los Angeles Division of Geriatrics, Borun Center for Gerontological Research. She stayed there until 2006, when she joined the faculty at Vanderbilt University. That same year, she published Feeding Assistance Needs of Long‐Stay Nursing Home Residents and Staff Time to Provide Care with John F. Schnelle.

At Vanderbilt, Simmons worked at the Vanderbilt Center for Quality Aging alongside Schnelle "using evidence-based research to inform programming for memory-impaired residents." She later spent time researching the effectiveness of reduced medication intake on elderly patients. Simmons was eventually promoted to interim director of the Vanderbilt Center for Quality Aging and Deputy Assistant Director of Research at the Geriatric Research, Education and Clinical Center. While serving in these roles on September 16, 2019, Simmons was appointed the Joe C. Davis Endowed Chair in Biomedical Science at Vanderbilt University.
