= Agnes Fogo =

Renal pathologist

- Known for: Kidney disease research
- Scientific career
- Institutions: Vanderbilt University Medical Center

Agnes B. Fogo is a professor of renal pathology at the Vanderbilt University Medical Center.

== Biography ==
Fogo graduated from the University of Oslo, Norway, and the University of Tennessee, USA. She completed her M.D. from Vanderbilt University School of Medicine before going on to do residency and a fellowship in renal pathology.

== Appointments ==
Fogo works at the Vanderbilt University Medical Center and is the John L. Shapiro Professor of Pathology, Microbiology and Immunology, Professor of Medicine and Pediatrics, and director of the Renal/Electron Microscopy Laboratory.

In 2021 she also became the International Society of Nephrology president for a 2 year term.

== Awards ==
- 2011 Robert G. Narins award from the American Society of Nephrology for "substantial accomplishments in the development and leadership of educational courses and resources"
- 2019 Roscoe R. Robinson award from the International Society of Nephrology

== Publications ==
=== Selected journal articles ===
- The classification of glomerulonephritis in systemic lupus erythematosus revisited, Kidney International, 65, 2, February 2004, p521-530, doi:10.1111/j.1523-1755.2004.00443.x
- Banff 07 Classification of Renal Allograft Pathology: Updates and Future Directions, American Journal of Transplantation, 8, 4, April 2008, p753-760, doi:10.1111/j.1600-6143.2008.02159.x
- Renal histopathological analysis of 26 postmortem findings of patients with COVID-19 in China, Kidney International, 98, 1, July 2020, p219-227, doi:10.1016/j.kint.2020.04.003

=== Books ===
- Agnes B. Fogo; Arthur H. Cohen; Robert B. Colvin; J. Charles Jennette; Charles E. Alpers (2014). Fundamentals of renal pathology (Second ed.). New York. ISBN 978-3-642-39079-1.
- Agnes B. Fogo; Michael Kashgarian (2022). Diagnostic atlas of renal pathology (4th ed.). Philadelphia, PA. ISBN 978-0-323-72163-9.
