= Balser =

Balser is a surname. Notable people with the surname include:

- Ewald Balser (1898–1978), German film actor
- Gordon Balser (1954–2024), Canadian politician and teacher
- Jeff Balser (born 1962), American professor of medicine
- Ruth Balser (born 1948), American politician from Massachusetts

== See also ==
- William Balser Skirvin (1860–1944), American real-estate developer
