= David Charles (physician) =

American neurologist (born 1964)

- Born: Decatur, Alabama, U.S.
- Education: Vanderbilt University School of Medicine
- Years active: 1995–present
- Known for: Parkinson's Disease research
- Medical career
- Profession: Physician
- Institutions: Vanderbilt University Medical Center
- Sub-specialties: Neurology
- Research: Movement disorders

David Charles is an American neurologist and professor who serves as vice-chair of neurology at Vanderbilt University Medical Center.

== Education ==
David Charles attended Vanderbilt University School of Medicine, graduating in 1990. After completing his neurology residency at Vanderbilt University Medical Center, he joined the faculty of the Department of Neurology at Vanderbilt University in 1994. From 1994 to 1995, he was a fellow in Movement Disorders and Clinical Neurophysiology at Vanderbilt. In 1996, he completed the Health Care Management Program at the Owen Graduate School of Management. In January and May 1997, he completed the Harvard Macy Institute's Program for Physician Educators. In 1998, he studied deep brain stimulation and its use as a treatment for Parkinson's disease as a Fulbright Senior Scholar at the Universitaire de Grenoble in Grenoble, France.

== Professional activities ==
Charles is a past chairman of the Public Policy Committee of the American Neurological Association, a Fellow of the American Academy of Neurology and a Fellow of the American Neurological Association, and a past board member of the United Council of Neurologic Subspecialties. From 1997 to 1998, he was a Health Policy Fellow on the staff of the Labor Subcommittee for Public Health and Safety, United States Senate.

At Vanderbilt he serves as vice-chair of neurology, and previously served as the assistant dean of admissions for the medical school and the Neurology Residency Program Director.

=== Alliance for Patient Access ===
Charles is also the chair of the Alliance for Patient Access, which, according to The Wall Street Journal, "represents physicians and is largely funded by the pharmaceutical industry. The contributors mostly include brand-name drug makers and biotechs, but some – such as Pfizer and Amgen – are also developing biosimilars."

In a 2013 opinion article, Charles argued that high out-of-pocket costs for specialty drugs could prevent patients from filling prescriptions and increase other healthcare costs. He described specialty drugs as including individualized medications based on diagnostic testing and biologic medicines, and proposed reducing co-pays for patients who require high-cost specialty-tier medications while slightly increasing co-pays for commonly used lower-tier medications.

== Research ==
Charles's research is primarily focused on movement disorders including Parkinson's disease, cervical dystonia, tremor, spasticity, and neurotoxin injections. Charles has led clinical research investigating deep brain stimulation in people with early-stage Parkinson's disease.

One focus of Charles's movement-disorders research has been deep brain stimulation (DBS) for Parkinson's disease. In a 2021 interview with Neurology Today, Charles described the 2016 United States approval of DBS for mid-stage Parkinson's disease as "one of the biggest advances" in the field. He stated that "the data are very clear that DBS plus medicine is superior to medicine alone in controlling symptoms and improving quality of life in mid- and advanced-stage disease." Charles was also a co-author of "Subthalamic Nucleus Deep Brain Stimulation May Reduce Medication Costs in Early Stage Parkinson's Disease."

He has authored over 100 research publications and has served as principal investigator of a clinical trial investigating deep brain stimulation in people with early-stage Parkinson's disease.
