= Robert D. Collins =

American physician (1928–2013)

Robert Deaver Collins
- Born: October 28, 1928; Davidson, Tennessee
- Died: November 28, 2013 (age 85); Nashville, TN
- Education: Vanderbilt University
- Known for: Establishment of the Lukes–Collins scheme for pathologic classification of lymphoma
- Awards: Distinguished Pathologist Award of the United States & Canadian Academy of Pathology
- Scientific career
- Fields: Medicine & Pathology

Robert Collins (1928–2013) was an American physician and pathologist, who worked for his entire career at Vanderbilt University.

== Early life and education ==
Robert Deaver Collins was born on October 28, 1928, in Davidson, Tennessee, to Winifred (née Poindexter) Collins and Claude Adolphus Collins. He was the older of their 2 sons. Dr. Collins attended Webb School in Bell Buckle, Tennessee, and received his B.A. (1948) and M.D. (1951) degrees from Vanderbilt University in Nashville, TN. Collins was trained in the specialty of Pathology under the tutelage of Ernest William Goodpasture. Before that, he had served as a house-officer in internal medicine at Barnes Hospital/Washington University Medical Center and a fellow in microbiology at Johns Hopkins University.

== Career at Vanderbilt University School of Medicine ==
Dr. Collins joined the faculty at Vanderbilt University School of Medicine in 1957. He established the division of hematopathology there, training several pathologists who went on to become renowned in their own rights. Beginning in 1972, Collins collaborated with Dr. Robert J. Lukes in establishing a nosological system for the categorization of malignant lymphomas, which became known as the Lukes-Collins Classification. He published more than 150 scientific papers in the peer-reviewed literature and also authored a fascicle in the Atlas of Tumor Pathology that is published by the U.S. Armed Forces Institute of Pathology. In 2001, Dr. Collins and Dr. Steven Swerdlow edited the first available textbook on pediatric hematopathology. During his long career at Vanderbilt Medical School, Dr. Collins taught generations of medical students. The high standards to which he held both himself and his trainees helped to shape their careers. His excellence as a teacher, research scientist, and clinical pathologist was recognized through numerous awards from medical school classes and the faculty at Vanderbilt. These included the Harvie Branscomb Distinguished Professorship; the Grant Liddle Award for Excellence in Research; the Distinguished Alumnus Award from the Vanderbilt Medical Alumni Association; the John L. Shapiro Chair in Pathology; the Jack Davies Award, and The School of Medicine Faculty Award for Excellence in Teaching. Collins was also given the Distinguished Pathologist Award for Career Achievement by the United States and Canadian Academy of Pathology in 2005.

== Retirement and subsequent activities ==
Upon retiring from active medical practice in 1999, Dr. Collins began a second career, writing historical books. The biography of his mentor, Dr. Goodpasture, was published in 2002. Another book—Ahemic Lake Connections: The Founding Leadership of Vanderbilt University—was completed in 2004.

Collins died on November 28, 2013, in Nashville, TN, at age 85, of prostatic carcinoma. He was survived by his wife, Elizabeth Cate Collins, and his 4 children—Robert Deaver Collins Jr.; Richard Roos-Collins; Elizabeth Landress Collins; and William Drew Collins.
