= Gene Anderson =

Gene Anderson may refer to:

- Gene Anderson (actress) (1931–1965), British actress
- Gene Anderson (basketball) (1917–1999), American professional basketball player
- Gene Anderson (wrestler) (1939–1991), American professional wrestler

== See also ==
- Jean Andersen (born 1988), South African tennis player
- Jean Anderson (disambiguation)
- Eugene Anderson (disambiguation)
