= Denzer, Wisconsin =

- Unincorporated community
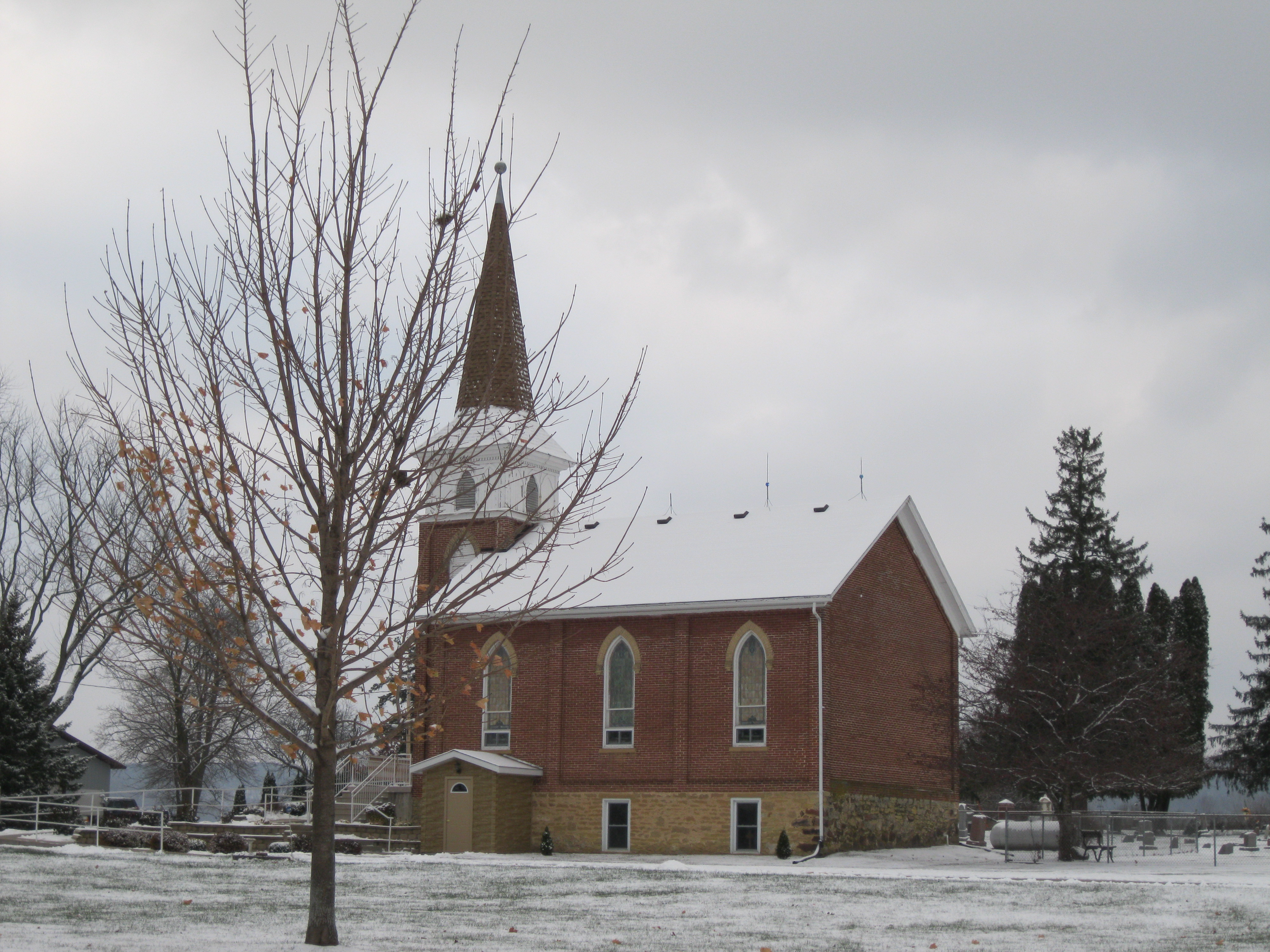
- Denzer United Methodist Church

- Location within Wisconsin Location within the United States
- Coordinates: 43°20′39″N 89°53′12″W
- Country: United States
- State: Wisconsin
- County: Sauk
- Elevation: 804 ft (245 m)
- Time zone: UTC-6 (Central (CST))
  - Summer (DST): UTC-5 (CDT)
- Area code: 608
- GNIS feature ID: 1563909

Denzer is an unincorporated community in the town of Honey Creek, Sauk County, Wisconsin, United States. Denzer is located on County Highway C east of Natural Bridge State Park, 9 miles (14 km) west-northwest of Prairie du Sac.

== History ==
The community was named for Heinrich W. Denzer, who had donated land for a church and a school.

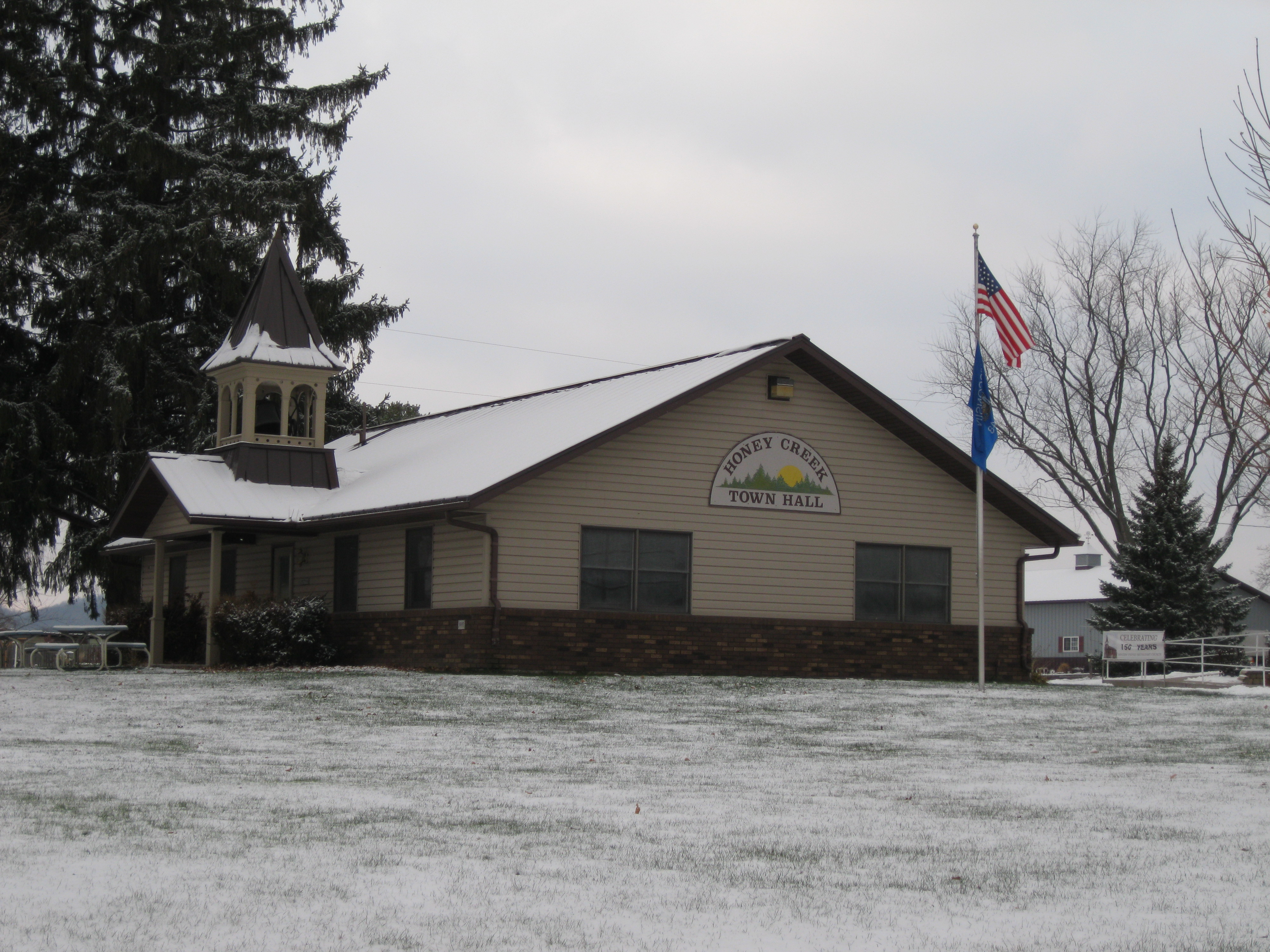
Honey Creek Town Hall in Denzer
