= G. Patrick Maxwell =

American plastic surgeon

G. Patrick Maxwell is a plastic surgeon and an assistant clinical professor of surgery at Vanderbilt University, based in Nashville, Tennessee.

Maxwell is a graduate of the Vanderbilt University Medical School, and trained in general and then plastic surgery at Johns Hopkins Hospital in Baltimore, Maryland. He also completed a fellowship in microsurgery at the University of California, San Francisco, with the microsurgical pioneer, Harry J. Buncke, and in hand surgery at the Curtis Hand Center in Baltimore.

Maxwell was the surgeon and co-author of the first successful report of microsurgical transfer of the latissimus muscle flap, at Johns Hopkins University in the late 1970s. In the early 1980s, he relocated to Nashville, where he founded the Nashville Plastic Surgery Institute and established a fellowship training program in breast and cosmetic surgery.

Maxwell is credited with a significant advancement in the design of tissue expanders used for breast reconstruction by co-developing textured surfaces (to decrease capsular contracture) and helping to introduce prostheses which more closely resemble the shape and feel of the natural breast. The two-stage method of expander-implant reconstruction as described by Maxwell and Spears has become the most widely used technique for implant-based breast reconstruction.

His work on concepts of matching implants and surgical techniques to individual soft-tissue characteristics in cosmetic and reconstructive breast surgery led to a method called the "biodimensional approach" which advanced dimensional analysis rather than volume when using breast implants and expanders. In 2003, Maxwell helped found the Inamed Academy, a series of international educational symposia focusing on breast surgery.

He has contributed a number of articles to the anatomic descriptions, clinical applications, and aesthetic refinements of the transverse rectus abdominis myocutaneous (TRAM) and latissimus flap procedures for breast reconstruction, and is an authority on silicone breast implants and ultrasonic liposuction technologies.

Maxwell was also the co-founder of the Tennessee-Kentucky chapter of Operation Smile, past president of the Nashville Chapter of the American Cancer Society, a founder and board member of the Aspen Center for Integrative Medicine, and co-founder and Executive EVP Diversified Specialty Institute.

On April 17, 2007, Maxwell was recognized for his contributions to medicine by Representative Marsha Blackburn (Republican-Tennessee) through a resolution written into the US Congressional Record.

== Professional recognition ==
- 2007 US Congress resolution recipient honoring his contributions in medicine
- 2005 Presidential Award from the American Society of Plastic Surgeons
- Three time recipient of the Walter Scott Brown Award for best education videotape/film awards from the Aesthetic Surgery Education and Research Foundation.
- 1997 In Chul Song Award winner for a plastic surgeon whose philanthropic plastic surgery efforts to citizens in less fortunate countries best exemplifies humanitarian service
- 1993 Dr. Maxwell served as the featured visiting professor for the aids Plastic Surgery Education Foundation
- Included in The Best Doctors in America list annually since 1991
- 1980 James Barret Brown Award for the best plastic surgery related paper published during the previous calendar year
- Robert H. Ivy Society Award
