= J. B. Ragatz =

American politician

J. B. Ragatz was a member of the Wisconsin State Assembly.

== Biography ==
Ragatz was born on December 16, 1862 in the Town of Honey Creek, Sauk County, Wisconsin. He later went into business in Prairie du Sac, Wisconsin.

== Political career ==
Ragatz was elected to the Assembly in 1904. He was also a member of the village council of Prairie du Sac and of the county board of Sauk County, Wisconsin. He was a Republican.
