= Ed Connor =

Professor of neuroscience

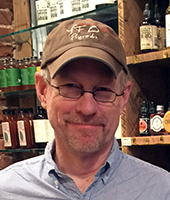
- Born: Charles Edward Connor Jr. August 13, 1955 (age 71); Baltimore, Maryland
- Citizenship: United States
- Education: Loyola University Maryland (BS)
- Spouse: Amy Bastian
- Scientific career
- Fields: Neuroscience
- Workplaces: Johns Hopkins University
- Thesis: The neural basis of tactual roughness perception (1990)
- Doctoral advisor: Ken Johnson
- Website: krieger.jhu.edu/mbi/research/Connor/

Charles Edward "Ed" Connor Jr. (born August 13, 1955) is an American neuroscientist who has made important contributions to the neuroscience of object synthesis in higher-level visual cortex. From 2009 he has been a professor of neuroscience at Johns Hopkins University. In 2007 Connor was appointed Director of the Zanvyl Krieger Mind Brain Institute at Johns Hopkins. Connor has interests in neuroaesthetics, the relation between neuroscience and beauty.

== Education ==
Connor completed a B.S. in biology at Loyola University Maryland in 1978, an M.S. at Vanderbilt University School of Medicine in 1982 and a PhD at Johns Hopkins University in 1990 under Ken Johnson.

Connor pursued neuroscience as a postdoctoral researcher with Gian Poggio and Mike Steinmetz at Johns Hopkins University School of Medicine (1990–1992) and with David van Essen at California Institute of Technology and Washington University School of Medicine (1992–1996) before joining the faculty at the Johns Hopkins School of Medicine in 1996.

== Personal life ==
Since 2002, Connor has been married to Amy Bastian, who is a professor of neuroscience at Johns Hopkins School of Medicine, and they have one son.
