= Amy Bastian =

American neuroscientist (born 1968)

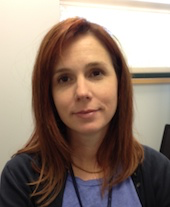
- Born: Amy Jo Bastian; 23 July 1968 (age 58); South Bend, Indiana, U.S.
- Education: University of Oklahoma Washington University in St. Louis
- Spouse: Ed Connor
- Awards: National Academy of Sciences (2023)
- Scientific career
- Fields: Neuroscience
- Workplaces: Johns Hopkins University; Washington University School of Medicine
- Thesis: Damage of the human cerebellum (1995)
- Doctoral advisor: W. Thomas Thach
- Website: Bastian website

Amy Jo Bastian (born July 23, 1968) is an American neuroscientist, who has made important contributions to the neuroscience of sensorimotor control. From 2011 she has been a professor of neuroscience at Johns Hopkins School of Medicine. In 2015 Bastian was appointed Chief Science Officer at the Kennedy Krieger Institute. Bastian is a member of the National Academy of Sciences.

== Education ==
Bastian completed a B.S. in Physical Therapy at the University of Oklahoma in 1990. She completed her doctoral degree in movement science at Washington University in St. Louis in 1995 then her postdoctoral fellowship in neuroscience under W. Thomas Thach.

== Career ==
Bastian pursued neuroscience as a postdoctoral researcher (1995–1997) at Washington University before joining the faculty of Washington University School of Medicine in 1998. in 2001, Bastian joined the Kennedy Krieger Institute and Johns Hopkins School of Medicine.She is currently the Chief Science Officer of the Kennedy Krieger Institute. She frequently collaborates with Ryan Roemmich of the Johns Hopkins School of Medicine, who currently serves as the director of the Center for Movement Studies at the Kennedy Krieger Institute. Bastian was inducted into the National Academy of Sciences in 2023.

=== Awards and honors ===
- 2023 Inducted into the National Academy of Sciences
- 2026 elected member of the National Academy of Medicine

== Filmography ==
Bastian appeared on Season 3 Episode 8 of Brain Games, which premiered in 2014 on National Geographic. She was featured in Bill Nye: Science Guy in 2018.

== Personal life ==
Bastian is the daughter of neuroscientist Joseph Bastian, who worked at the University of Oklahoma, and Christine Bastian.
