= Natural Bridge State Park (Wisconsin) =

State park in Sauk County, Wisconsin

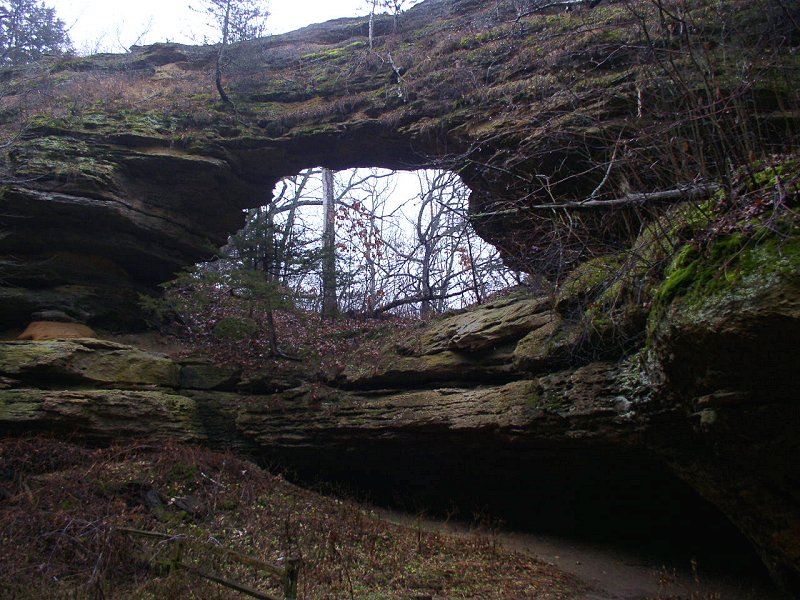

- Location within Wisconsin Location within the United States
- Interactive map of Natural Bridge State Park
- Location: Sauk County, Wisconsin, United States
- Coordinates: 43°20′53″N 89°55′52″W
- Area: 530 acres (210 ha)
- Elevation: 1,020 ft (310 m)
- Established: 1942
- Administrator: Wisconsin Department of Natural Resources
- Visitors: 33,217 (DNR est.) (in 2024)
- Website: Official website
- Wisconsin State Parks
- Raddatz Rockshelter
- U.S. National Register of Historic Places
- Location within Wisconsin Location within the United States
- Location: Address restricted
- NRHP reference No.: 78000139
- Added to NRHP: December 18, 1978

Natural Bridge State Park is a 530-acre (214 ha) state park of Wisconsin, United States, featuring Wisconsin's largest natural arch. Directly beneath the arch is the Raddatz Rockshelter, a rock shelter once used by Paleo-Indians and now listed on the National Register of Historic Places. The park is located southwest of Baraboo between the unincorporated communities of Leland and Denzer, in the town of Honey Creek.

== Natural history ==
The park is on the edge of the Baraboo Range in an unglaciated Driftless Area of south-central Wisconsin. Outcrops of quartzite, hardened sand deposited about 1.6 billion years ago jut out of the tops of these hills.

The arch and rock shelter have been weathered out of one such outcropping. The top of the arch is 35 feet (11 m) above the ground. The arch opening is 25 feet (7.6 m) wide and 15 feet (4.6 m) high. The rock shelter is 60 feet (18 m) wide and 30 feet (9.1 m) deep.

The park's hills are forested with oak and other hardwoods. Some ridge tops bear small prairie remnants with grasses and cactus. Around the outcrop walls grow ferns such as the walking fern (Asplenium rhizophyllum), slender lip fern (Cheilanthes feei) and the rare purple cliffbrake (Pellaea atropurpurea). The shade of the rock faces also supports Solidago sciaphila, a rare goldenrod.

== Cultural history ==
An archaeological excavation of the rock shelter was conducted in 1957 by Warren L. Wittry of the Wisconsin Historical Society. His team found evidence of human use over a long time period. The remains of 50 vertebrate and 15 mollusc species were identified. The oldest artifacts were pieces of charred wood, presumably from fire pits, which were dated to between 9000 and 8000 BCE. This would make it the oldest documented site of human occupation in the upper Midwest. There were also artifacts such as antler-scrapers dating back to six to seven thousand years ago. Evidence indicates that the shelter was used only periodically at first, perhaps as a hunting or seasonal camp. Later it was inhabited year-round.

The natural bridge has been a tourist attraction for modern visitors since 1870. The state park was established in 1972, and the following year 60 acres (24 ha) centered on the arch were given a further level of protection as Natural Bridge and Rockshelter State Natural Area. In 1978 the Raddatz Rockshelter was listed on the National Register of Historic Places.

== Recreation ==
There are no amenities at the park.

There are two trails in the park, totalling about 3.5 miles (5.6 km). The arch and rock shelter are short distance up the Indian Moccasin Nature Trail, which then loops further through the wooded hills. Signs along the trail interpret the medicinal uses of many native plants. The longer Whitetail Hiking Trail leads across the highway to the less-used southern half of the park.

The southern portion of the park is open for hunting during parts of autumn.

== Gallery ==
Natural Bridge time lapse - stars Jan 19, 2012, VP8

Natural Bridge State Park, pan VP8
