= Leland, Wisconsin =

- Unincorporated community
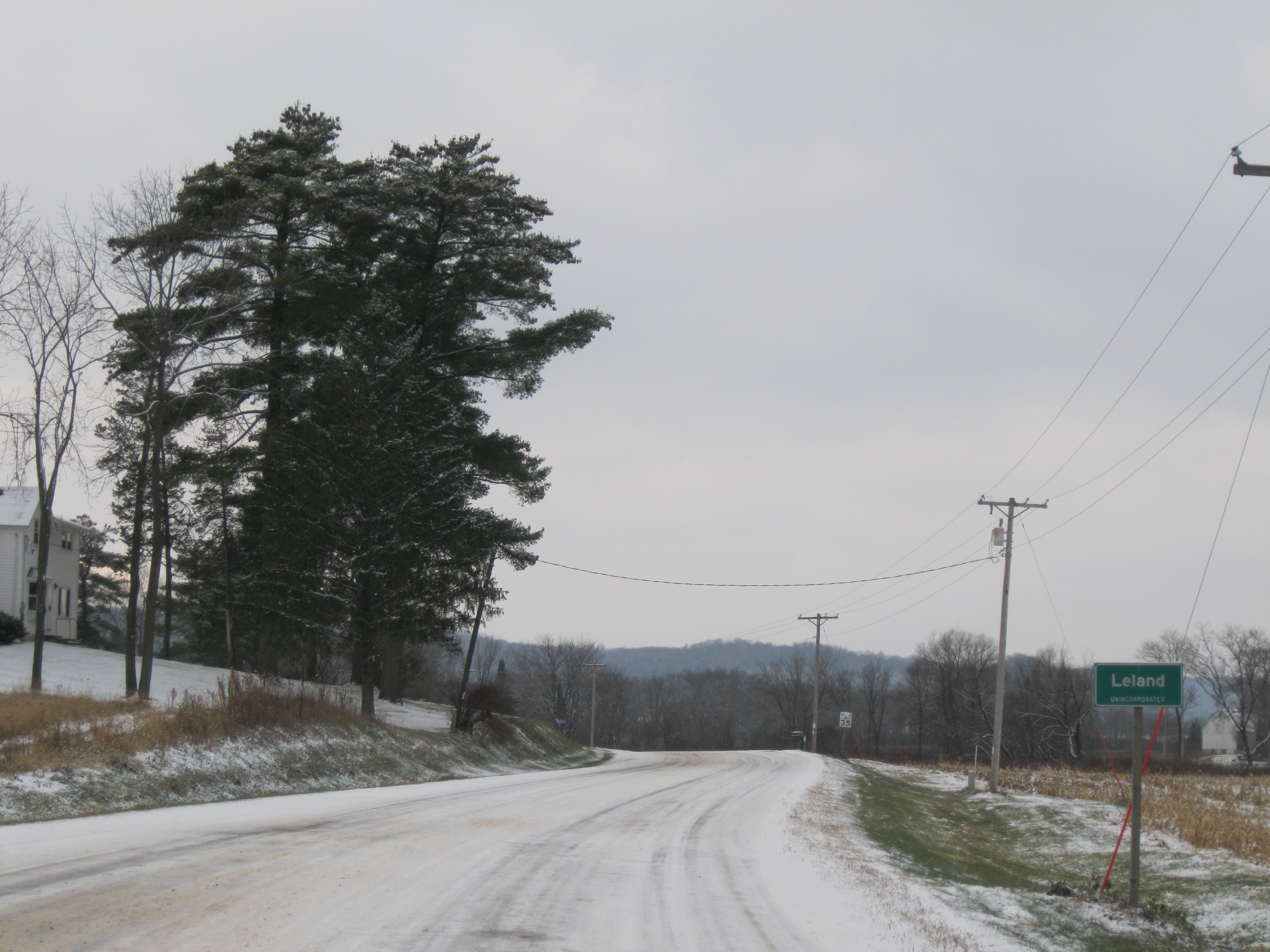
- Entering Leland on County Highway C

- Location within Wisconsin Location within the United States
- Coordinates: 43°20′08″N 89°56′51″W
- Country: United States
- State: Wisconsin
- County: Sauk
- Elevation: 784 ft (239 m)
- Time zone: UTC-6 (Central (CST))
  - Summer (DST): UTC-5 (CDT)
- Area code: 608
- GNIS feature ID: 1567961

Leland is an unincorporated community in the town of Honey Creek, Sauk County, Wisconsin, United States. Leland is located on County Highway C south of Natural Bridge State Park, 12 miles (19 km) west-northwest of Prairie du Sac.

The community was named for Cyrus Leland, who built a sawmill around which the settlement coalesced.

== Photos ==
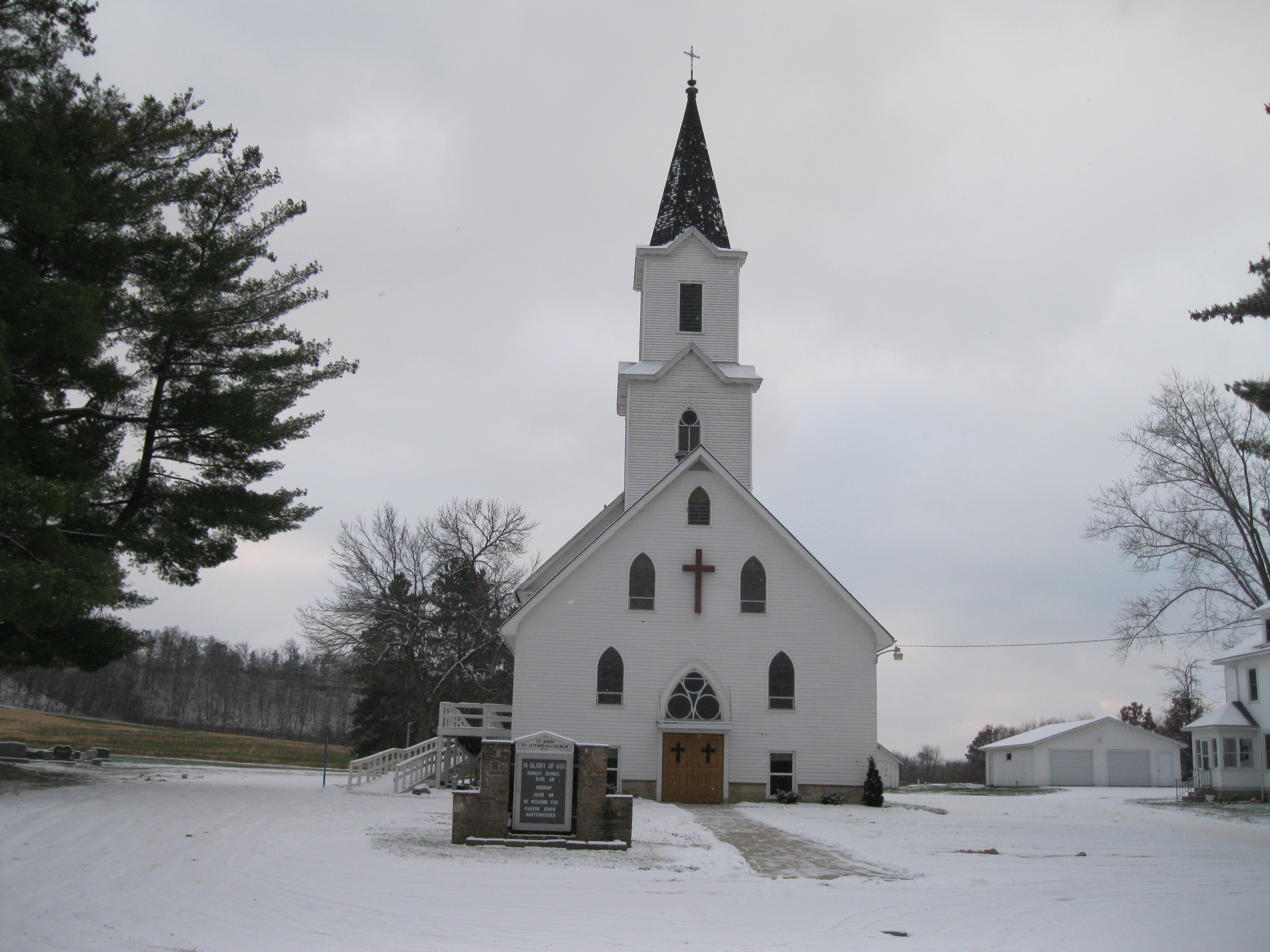
St. John Evangelical Lutheran Church

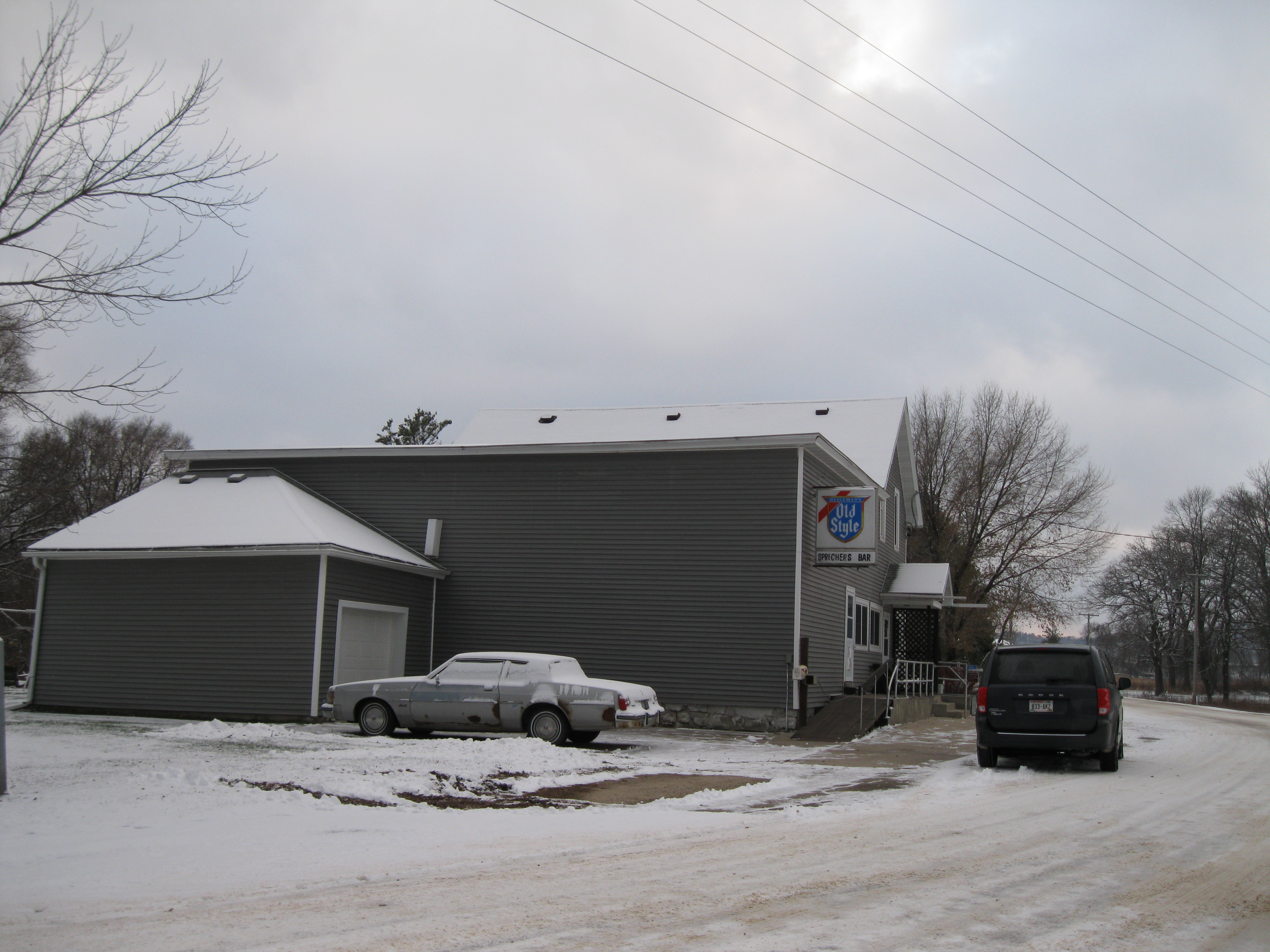
Sprechers Bar

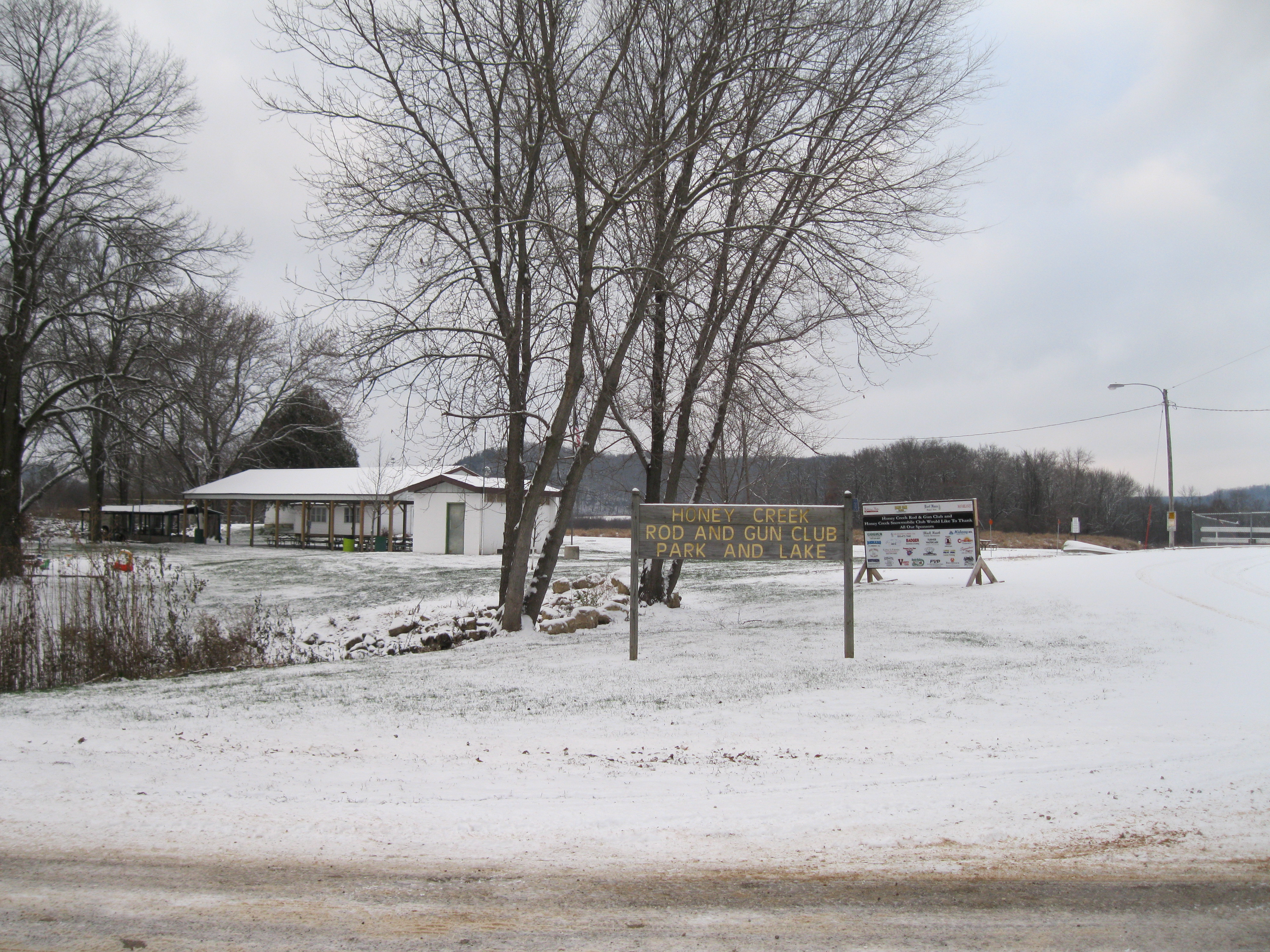
Honey Creek Rod and Gun Club Park and Lake
