= Carol Tamminga =

American psychiatrist and neuroscientist

Carol A. Tamminga
- Born: Grand Rapids, Michigan
- Education: Vanderbilt University; University of Chicago
- Occupations: Psychiatrist and neuroscientist
- Spouse: Jim Hengeveld
- Children: Cristan and Bonnie

Carol A. Tamminga is an American psychiatrist and neuroscientist, focusing in treating psychotic illnesses, such as schizophrenia, psychotic bipolar disorder, and schizoaffective disorder, currently the Lou and Ellen McGinley Distinguished Chair in Psychiatric Research and the Chief of the Translational Neuroscience Division in Schizophrenia at University of Texas Southwestern Medical Center. She has been Chair of the Department of Psychiatry at UTSW since 2008. She is an Elected Fellow of the National Academy of Medicine. She serves on the advisory boards of the Brain and Behavioral Research Foundation and of the National Institute of Mental Health (NIMH). In 2011 she was awarded the Lieber Prize for Outstanding Achievement in Schizophrenia Research. Tamminga led a study examining whether giving Prozac to fetuses with Down syndrome would improve the functioning of their brains. In her attempt to confirm psychiatric diagnoses biologically, she found "biotypes" or "clusters." Her current research involves mechanisms underlying schizophrenia, especially its most prominent symptoms, psychosis and memory dysfunction.

== Early life ==
Tamminga was born in Grand Rapids, Michigan to Freda Tamminga (née Hekman) and Sam Tamminga. She is the granddaughter of John E. Hekman, founder of the Hekman Biscuit Company, which through mergers and rebranding became the Keebler Company. She is also the niece of Edward J. Hekman, former President of the Keebler Company and founding Administrator of the Food and Nutrition Service, United States Department of Agriculture. She has three siblings: Bill (d. 2020), Ed and Evelyn (d. 1971).

Tamminga earned her M.D. degree from Vanderbilt University and completed her residency in psychiatry at the University of Chicago. She was a member of the University of Chicago faculty from 1975 to 1979 before moving on to the National Institute for Neurological Disorders and Stroke for neurology training. At the University of Maryland Medical School beginning in 1979, she taught, conducted research and performed clinical care before relocating to University of Texas Southwestern Medical Center in 2003.

== Marriage and children ==
She was married to Jim Hengeveld (d. 2006) and has two daughters: Cristan Tamminga and Bonnie Tamminga Fleming. In September 2022, Bonnie was named Fermilab's chief research officer and deputy director for science and technology.
