= Charles Robert Hager =

American protestant missionary in China

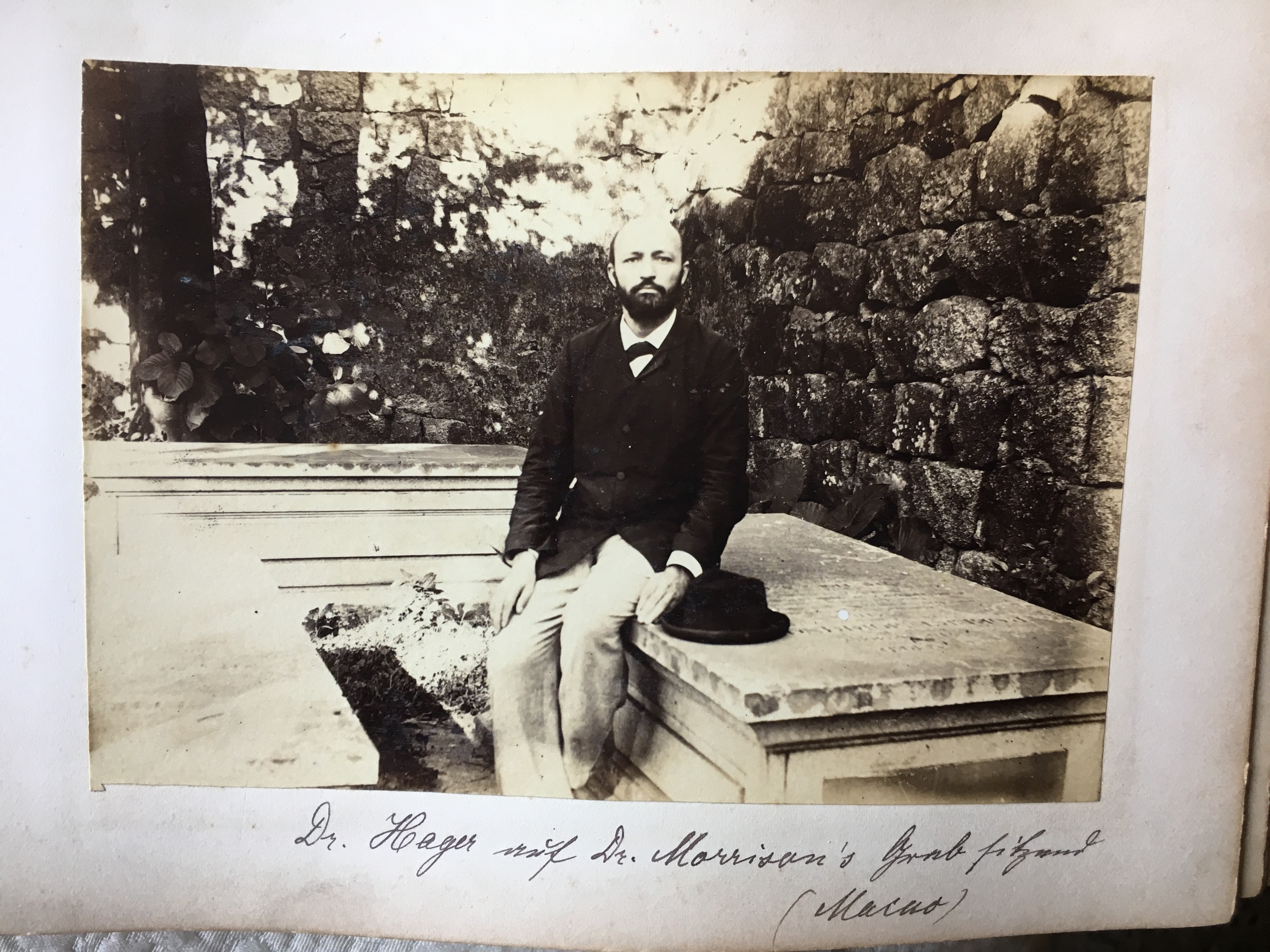
- Hager at Dr. Robert Morrison's graveyard, Macao
- Born: October 27, 1851; Nänikon, Switzerland
- Died: July 13, 1917 (aged 65); Claremont, California
- Resting place: Oak Park Cemetery
- Education: Oberlin College; Pacific Theological Seminary (D.D.); Vanderbilt University (M.D.)
- Occupation: Clergyman/ Missionary/ Physician
- Known for: the baptizer of Dr. Sun Yat-sen
- Title: Founder and the first Minister-in-charge, China Congregational Church
- Term: 1883–1910
- Successor: Rev. Park Yung
- Spouse(s): Lizzie Winona Blackman (1860–1895) (1894 marr.); Maria von Rausch (1863–1918) (1896 marr.)
- Children: Robert Morrison Hager (1897–1972); Elsie Hager (a.k.a. Mary Elizabeth Hager) (1901–1986); Harold Charles Hager (1909–1987)
- Parent(s): Rudolf Hager(1813–1878); Elizabeth Hager(1819–1905)

Rev. Dr. Charles Robert Hager (October 27, 1851 – July 13, 1917) was a Swiss-born American missionary sent to Hong Kong and China by the American Board of Commissioners for Foreign Missions (ABCFM) to start the Hong Kong Mission (later renamed as South China Mission) in 1883. He was best known as the baptizer of Dr. Sun Yat-sen, the first president and founding father of the Republic of China. Rev. Hager was the founder, and was regarded as the first Minister-in-charge, of the China Congregational Church in Hong Kong.

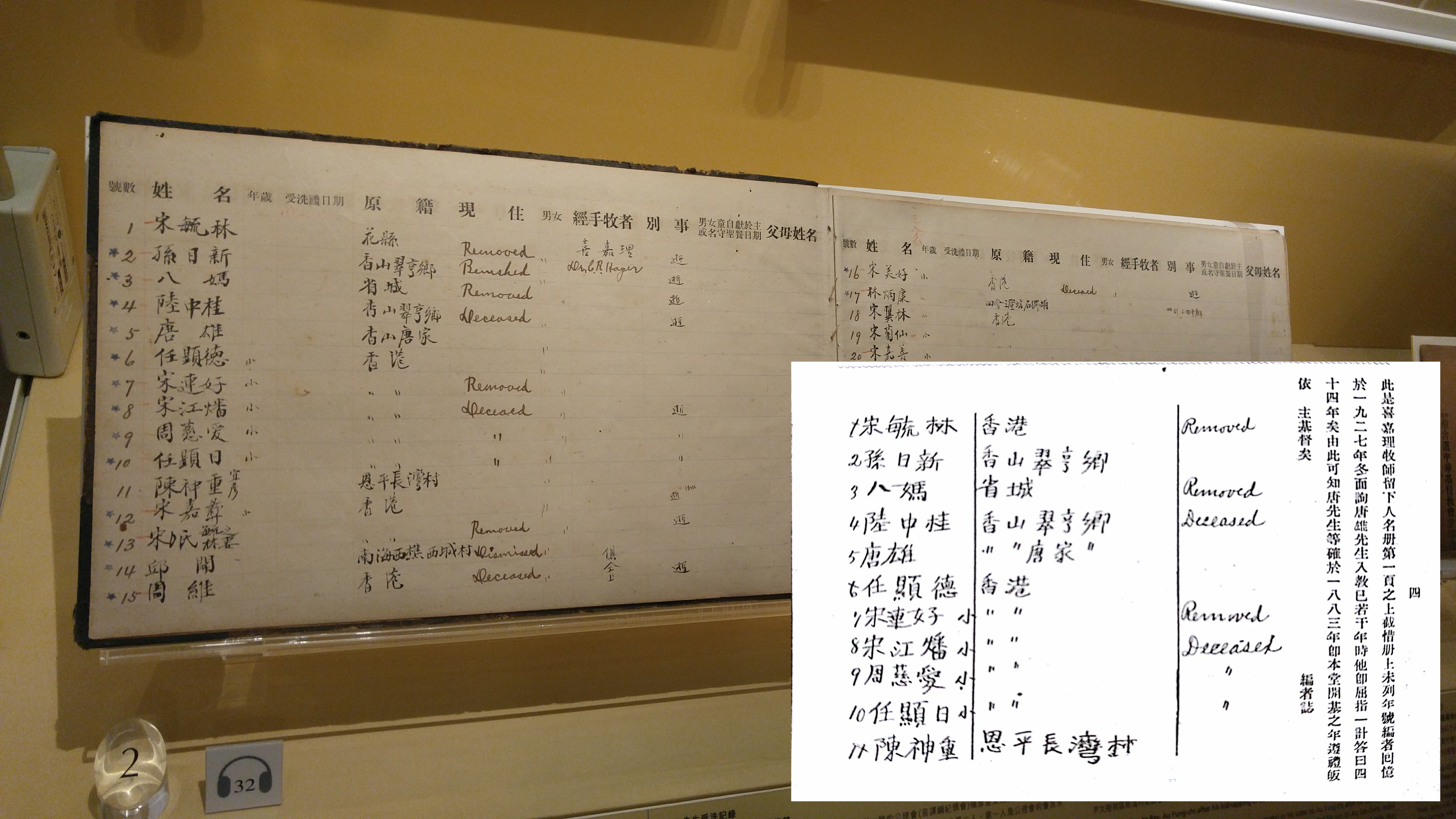
Picture of the baptism record of Dr. Sun Yat-sen taken in the Dr. Sun Yat-sen Museum, Hong Kong. The picture-in-picture shows a copy of the very original record in Hager's handwriting.

== Early life ==
Charles Robert Hager was born in Nänikon, Switzerland, October 27, 1851, to a farmer Rudolf Hager and his wife Elizabeth. The Hagers moved to America in 1858 and made Honey Creek, Sauk County, Wisconsin their new home. Charles R. Hager was enrolled in the preparatory department of the Oberlin College from 1867–1870, 1872–1874 and in college from 1874–1878. In 1882, he graduated from the Pacific Theological Seminary, Oakland, California and was ordained to the Congregational ministry at San Francisco, California, February 16, 1883.

== Hong Kong Mission ==
Before there were the strict Immigration Laws, thousands of Chinese from the Kwong Tung province found their way, as laborers and as merchants into the United States. Many of these were converted in the Missions opened for the Chinese in the larger cities. An appeal, by these converts, was made to the American Missionary Association, for a minister to their province, Kwong Tung, but in vain. They then turned to the American Board, and finally secured a single man, the Rev. C.R. Hager, in 1883.

Hager, immediately after his ordination, traveled on the steamer SS City of Tokio from San Francisco to Hong Kong and was ashore on May 31, 1883. With the help of Wan Tsing-kai, he rented a 3-storey house at 2 Bridges Street, Central and opened the mission including a school there. On May 4, 1884, Sun Yat-sen was baptized to become the second member of the mission church.

During his first term, 1883–1890, Hager had charge of 7 government schools in Hong Kong, and opened chapels in San Ning City, Miu Pin, Kwong Hoi and Hoi In, all in the San Ning District, which is now called Toishan.

In February 1891, owing to a serious illness, Hager was forced to take a long furlough and returned to America via Switzerland. In 1893, he began his study of medicine at Vanderbilt University and Nashville University and obtained his M.D. degree in 1894.

== South China Mission ==
During Hager's long furlough in the States, the mission was renamed as South China Mission with its center relocated in Canton (Guangzhou).

Dr. Hager rejoined the mission after his marriage with Lizzie Winona Blackman in Chicago on June 20, 1894, and the couple traveled back to China in September of the same year. However, after a very brief stay and service in Canton, Mrs. Hager died on the date of March 7, 1895, primarily due to kidney complaint. It was a sad and heavy stroke to Dr. Hager. Within a few months he was back once more in Hong Kong, and working harder than ever, especially with his "fine art" of country tours.

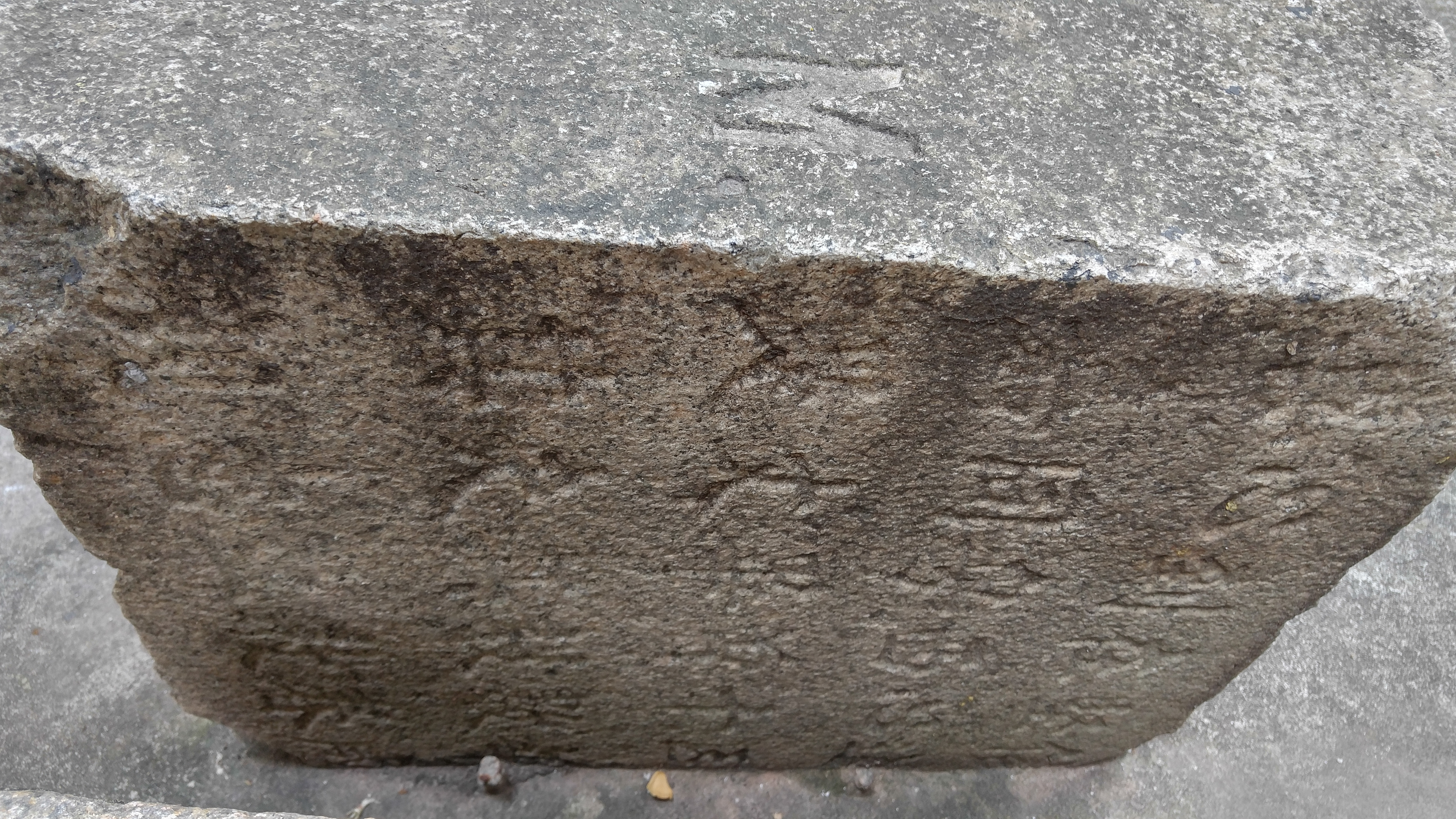
A part of the headstone of Mrs. Lizzie B. Hager had been left behind at the roadside when the cemetery was removed/relocated. It has recently been reunited with its tomb base.

On December 31, 1896, Dr. Hager married Maria von Rausch of the Basel Mission, Hong Kong, a lady who had been in mission work five years, and who opened the first kindergarten in South China. They got three children: Robert Morrison Hager, Elsie Hager, and Harold Charles Hager.

At the beginning of 1897, a chapel was rented on Staunton Street, Central District of Hong Kong where evening services were held every night. According to Hager, half of the rent was raised by the Chinese believers while the other half was paid by himself so that the mission board (ABCFM) was practically at no expense in reference to this new enterprise. The congregation of the Hong Kong church commenced to increase and in 1898, a lot at the corner of Ladder Street and Bridges Street was bought for nearly $8000 on which was built a 4-story Mission House. On October 12, 1901, the newly erected church was dedicated.

During his second term of service, Dr. Hager largely devoted himself to his country work. He was described as an indefatigable worker and endured all sorts of hardships and privations. In his zeal, he went beyond the Sz Yap District, as far as Yeungkong City, 200 miles south-west of Canton, and into San Hing and Tung On, north of the Hoi Ping District, into the "regions beyond." His itineraries were generally made on foot and in all kinds of weather, and attended by great hardships. This strenuousness resulted in a complete breakdown in 1910. He hoped that an ocean voyage would restore him and accordingly he left his family in Hong Kong and sailed for San Francisco. The change did not benefit him, so, in a few months, Mrs. Hager and children joined him, making their home in Claremont, California. He was then released from the mission in 1912.

== Death ==
During his last years, Dr. Hager still labored among the California Chinese, and across the border in Mexico, and frequently sent money to the South China Mission. Dr. Hager died July 13, 1917, at Claremont, California, of cancer of the stomach. He was buried at the Oak Park Cemetery with his second wife, Marie Hager, who died a year later.

== Photo Archive ==
Hager was fond of photography and most of his works are archived here by the Basel Mission: Photos by C.R. Hager@Basel Mission Archives (BM Archives)
