= Samuel Santoro =

American microbiologist and immunologist

Samuel A. Santoro is an American microbiologist and immunologist, focusing in structure and biology of integrin adhesive receptors for extracellular matrix proteins, currently the Dorothy B. and Theodore R. Austin Professor and Chair at Vanderbilt University.
