= Jean R. Anderson =

American scientist

Jean R. Anderson (born 1953) is an American obstetrician and gynaecologist, most well known for being the founder and first director of Johns Hopkins HIV Women's Health Program (1991).

Anderson was also the director of Division of Gynecologic Specialties, coordinator of Global Women's Health Fellowship, and a professor of Gynecology and Obstetrics. Her expertise included cervical cancer, gynecology, HIV/AIDS, pregnancy and childbirth, uterine fibroids, and women's reproductive health.

Anderson received her undergraduate degree in chemistry from David Lipscomb College. She started out at Vanderbilt University School of Medicine, being one of only five women in her class. In 1987, she began working for Johns Hopkins Hospital, where she was asked if she'd like to work for their new clinic made to help women with HIV. Her decision to take the job helped establish the clinic as a vital resource for the care needed for women with HIV and AIDS, being one of the first hospitals to use peer counseling.

Anderson has written over 75 articles on women with HIV, as well as the book The Manual for the Clinical Care for Women With HIV. Her efforts have garnered her international recognition, as well as for teaching awards, a membership at the American College of Obstetricians and Gynecologists and the American Academy of HIV Medicine. She continues to serve as a director at Johns Hopkins HIV Women's Health Program.

== Honors ==
- Salutatorian, David Lipscomb College, 1975
- CIBA Award for Community Service, Vanderbilt University School of Medicine, 1977
- J. Donald Woodruff Teaching Award, 1990
- APGO Excellence in Teaching Award, 1993
- Golden Apple Student Teaching Award, 1995
- Golden Apple Resident Teaching Award, 2002
- Alpha Omega Alpha Honor Medical Society, 2005
- Distinguished alumna - David Lipscomb University, 2010
- Excellence in Teaching and Mentorship Award, Housestaff, 2011
- Constance Wofsey Women's Health Investigator Award, AIDS Clinical Trials Group, 2013

== Books ==
- Anderson J (ed) A Guide to the Clinical Care of Women with HIV Infection, Washington, DC, U.S. Government Printing Office, 2013
