= Jean Anderson (dancer) =

Canadian dancer

- Born: Jean Brown; 1939; Dennyloanhead, Scotland
- Died: 7 February 1985 (aged 45–46); Toronto, Ontario
- Occupations: Dancer, teacher

Jean Brown Anderson (née Brown) (1939 – 7 February 1985) was a Canadian dancer, born at Dennyloanhead, Scotland to a musical family. Her mother, Jean Day, was a well-known singer, and her father, John Brown, a fiddle player who had spent time in the Yukon region of Canada prospecting for gold. In 1957, Anderson immigrated to Canada with her husband John, settling in the Hamilton and Toronto areas.

She was an accomplished musician and Scottish country dance teacher and practitioner. She formed several Scottish country dancing groups, leading the Canadian Scottish Country Dance Team and the Anderson Dancers. Her groups performed at folk festivals and highland games in the Toronto area as well as Massey Hall with Andy Stewart. The group performed with Fiddler's Green at the 1973 Mariposa Folk Festival. Anderson was in demand as an instructor and would travel to different regions and clubs to give classes. Anderson's siblings Robert Watt Brown and Christine Scott were also active performers of Scottish cultural traditions in Canada.

Anderson also performed in her native Scotland before moving Canada, appearing at the White Rose Festival in Leeds. Her Bothkinner dance instructions was published as a leaflet by the Royal Scottish Country Dance Society.

She died at Toronto East General Hospital on 7 February 1985.
