= Honey Creek (Wisconsin River tributary) =

Stream in Sauk County, Wisconsin, U.S.

Coordinates: 43°14′27″N 89°48′31″W

Honey Creek is a stream in Sauk County, Wisconsin, United States. It is a tributary of the Wisconsin River. It was so named because early settlers collected the honey of bees there. It also lends its name to the town of Honey Creek.

== See also ==
- List of rivers of Wisconsin
