= James Tayloe Gwathmey =

- Born: September 10, 1862; Roanoke, Virginia
- Died: February 11, 1944 (aged 81); Veterans Administration Hospital in Fayetteville, Arkansas
- Education: Vanderbilt University School of Medicine
- Known for: Co-authored the first textbook on anesthesiology, Anesthesia
- Scientific career
- Fields: Anesthesiology

James Tayloe Gwathmey, M.D. (September 10, 1862—February 11, 1944) was an American physician and the first president of the American Association of Anesthetics (now the International Anesthesia Research Society). A pioneer of early anesthetic devices for medical use, he co-authored the first comprehensive textbook on the subject of medical anesthetics, titled Anesthesia, which was published in 1914. For this and other contributions to anesthesiology, which included innovations in administering anesthetics to war wounded and in obstetrics, Gwathmey was hailed at the time of his death as the "Father of Modern Anesthesia."

== Biography ==
=== Early life ===
Gwathmey was born on September 10, 1862, at Buena Vista in Roanoke, Virginia, the childhood home of his mother, Mary Lavinia Tayloe, daughter of George Plater Tayloe and Mary Elizabeth Langhorne. He was a student at the Norfolk Male Academy and later attended the Virginia Military Institute. The third year of his college education was marked by multiple citations for bad behavior, including exhibiting "culpable neglect of his duties and studies" and "an air of careless indifference", going to a billiards saloon without authorization, and of throwing a brick into a subprofessor's window. This last infraction led to his expulsion from V.M.I. on December 8, 1887. While at the Institute, he had become very interested in acrobatics, so after his dismissal he left to join an acrobatic troupe that he traveled with for two years. Following this, he taught gymnastics at the YMCA first in Des Moines, Iowa, and then in Omaha, Nebraska. In 1890, Gwathmey moved to Nashville, Tennessee, where he founded and led the Summer School for Higher Culture at Vanderbilt University. During his time at the school, Gwathmey became president of the Bicycle Club, was Director of the Gymnasium and Instructor in Physical Exercise, and was the faculty advisor to the Chi chapter of the fraternity Kappa Alpha Order. He thought about pursuing a career in the ministry before enrolling at the Vanderbilt University School of Medicine, where he earned his M.D. in 1899. Gwathmey was a lifelong devotee to athletics and acrobatics and in 1915 published the book Tumbling for Amateurs.

=== Career ===
In 1902, several years after he finished medical school, Gwathmey moved to New York City and started practicing medicine. During this first year in New York, Gwathmey completed training in surgery and anesthesia at the New York Skin and Cancer Hospital. At the time, medical specialists whose sole job was to administer anesthesia did not exist, and as a resident Gwathmey practiced giving anesthesia alongside the rest of his training. While at the hospital, he made improvements on the Bennett Inhaler, an early self-administered chloroform device. Gwathmey, not wanting to accrue personal gain from the design or sale of his medical instruments, refused to receive money from or patent this and his later devices.

With his training complete in 1903, Gwathmey initially practiced both dermatology and anesthesia. His mastery of the design of anesthesia apparatuses and of the administration of the drugs, coupled with the dearth of trained anesthetists at the time, led him to quickly transition to practicing anesthesiology full-time. Gwathmey was among the first full-time private practice anesthesiologists in the U.S., and his actions helped to establish the field as an independent medical specialty on the same footing as the older specialties. His practice was not affiliated with any individual hospital or surgeon, instead he worked on a case-by-case basis and would send patients his own separate bill. His writings make clear this was a deliberate choice intended to guarantee his independence and income as an anesthetist:

Handling another man’s money is both theoretically and practically wrong. When the anesthetist is paid by the surgeon, it always means the minimum fee. The anesthetist should send his bills directly to the patient, thus establishing his identity and independence. Under this system the anesthetist can stand as high in the profession and make as good a living as other physicians. There would not be many gynecologists if the general practitioners who referred patients to them also paid them for their services.

Gwathmey was also actively involved in the early organization of anesthesiology as a specialty around this time. He was a founding member of the Long Island Society of Anesthetists, established in 1905. This organization expanded its scope on October 28, 1911, to become the New York Society of Anesthetists (which later expanded to a national level as the American Society of Anesthesiologists), in which Gwathmey served as the second president. He was a primary force behind the establishment of the first national organization of anesthetists. On June 12, 1912, the American Association of Anesthetists was incorporated and elected James T. Gwathmey as its first president. The innovations that Gwathmey imparted to the practice of anesthesia during the beginning of the 20th century were several. For one, he proposed using combinations of anesthetic agents during the same case. He also was a proponent of tailoring the choice of anesthetic to the particular patient and situation, ridiculing physicians who would only ever use a single method:

How foolish, then, for one to suggest or recommend this or that special anesthetic or method, as, for example, ether by the drop method. This seems like an attempt to fit the anesthetic to the anesthetist and not to the patient. Those who recommend the drop method exclusively would be satisfied with an orchestra of one piece and this one piece to have but one string.

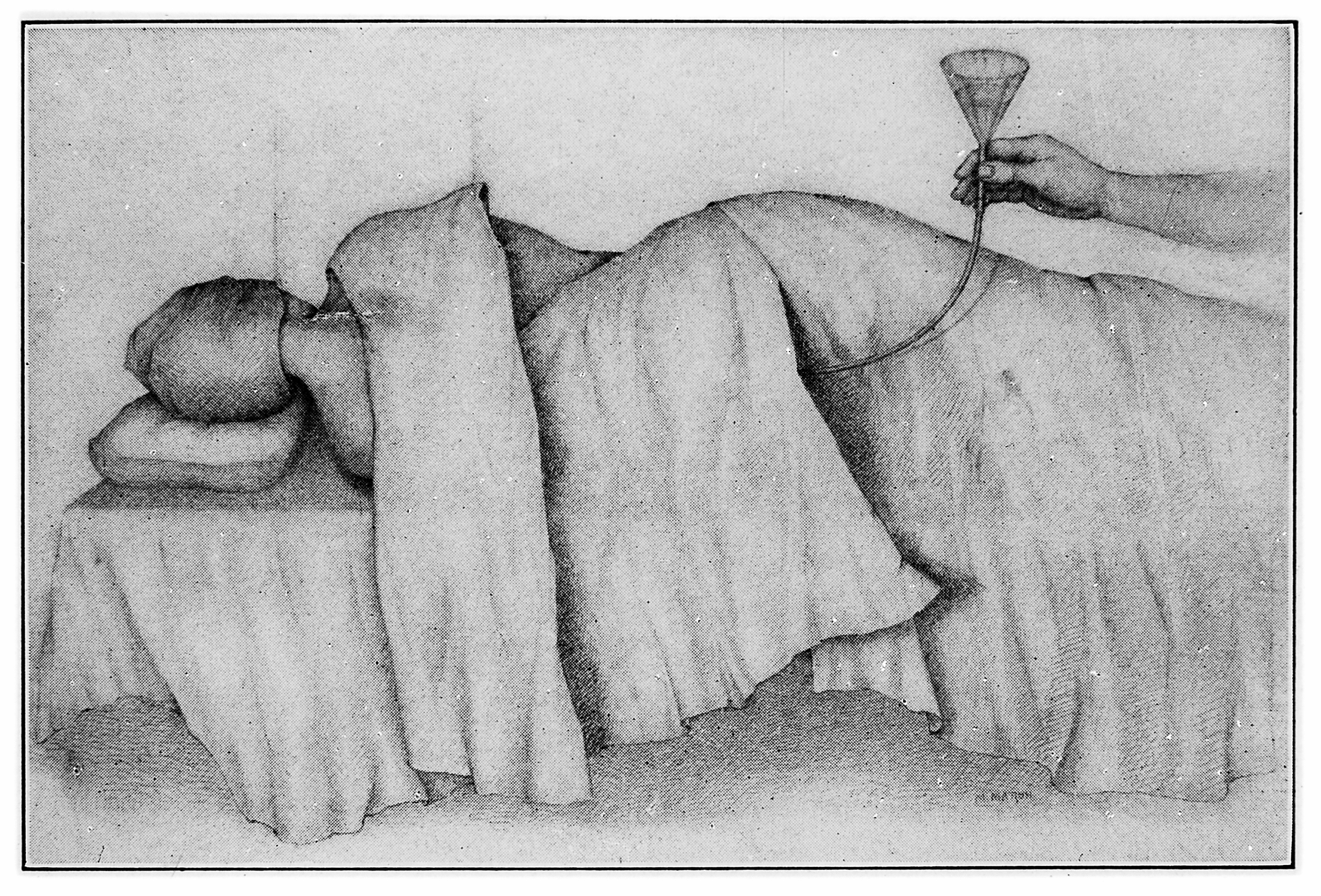
Illustration of rectal administration of Gwathmey's ether-oil anesthetic to a patient. This method of anesthesia was commonly used in obstetrics.

Gwathmey also developed an ether-oil anesthesia cocktail that would be given to patients rectally and was frequently used in obstetrics. He made refinements on a 1911 nitrous oxide-oxygen Boothby-Cotton anesthesia respirator, making adjustments that allowed the operator to estimate the amount of anesthetic gases remaining as well as reducing the weight of the instrument from 50 lbs (22.7 kg) to 14.5 lbs (6.6 kg). Writing with New York chemist Dr. Charles Baskerville, Gwathmey detailed his contributions and research within the first complete compilation of the medical knowledge of anesthesiology in the 1914 textbook titled Anesthesia.

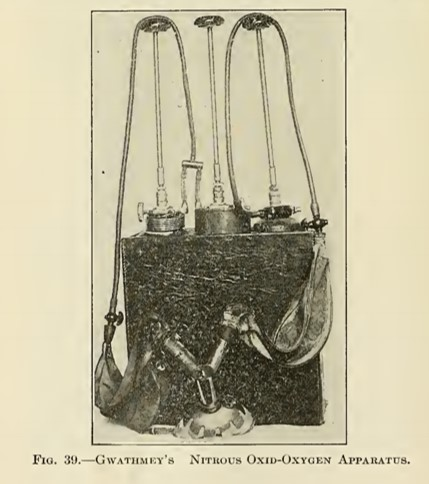
An illustration of Gwathmey's Nitrous Oxide-Oxygen anesthesia device as it appears in Gwathmey's 1914 textbook, Anesthesia.

When the United States became a belligerent in World War I, Gwathmey served in Europe as a captain in the medical branch of the United States Army. He advised both the French and British armies on the use of anesthesia, and his nitrous oxide-oxygen apparatus was frequently used to treat soldiers who were wounded in the conflict. Upon the conclusion of hostilities, Gwathmey returned to his New York practice. He remained active in academic medicine for the rest of his life, publishing 113 papers in medical journals and revising his textbook. His passion for learning and improving the practice of anesthesiology was not diminished in old age. He continued to attend the national meetings on anesthesia into his 70s. A colleague describes how Gwathmey decided to master the details of giving spinal anesthesia - this in 1934, when Gwathmey was 72 years old. It was only in 1939 that Gwathmey retired from clinical practice due to his severe bronchial asthma and coronary heart disease. James Tayloe Gwathmey died on February 11, 1944, at the Veterans Administration Hospital in Fayetteville, Arkansas.

=== Family ===
James T. Gwathmey was the third of six sons for mother Mary Lavinia Tayloe and his father William Watts Gwathmey. His father's side of the family was descended from Owen Gwathmey, who fled to Virginia from Wales in the 1600s. His mother was part of an old and respected Virginia family which carried a history of military and community service, The Tayloe's of Mount Airy. He married Margaret L. Riddle, a Nashville resident, in 1890, although the marriage ended in divorce. Gwathmey had one daughter, Mary Tayloe Gwathmey, and one son, William Riddle Gwanthmey, who was a captain in the British Army.
