= Gene Anderson (basketball) =

American basketball player (1917–1999)

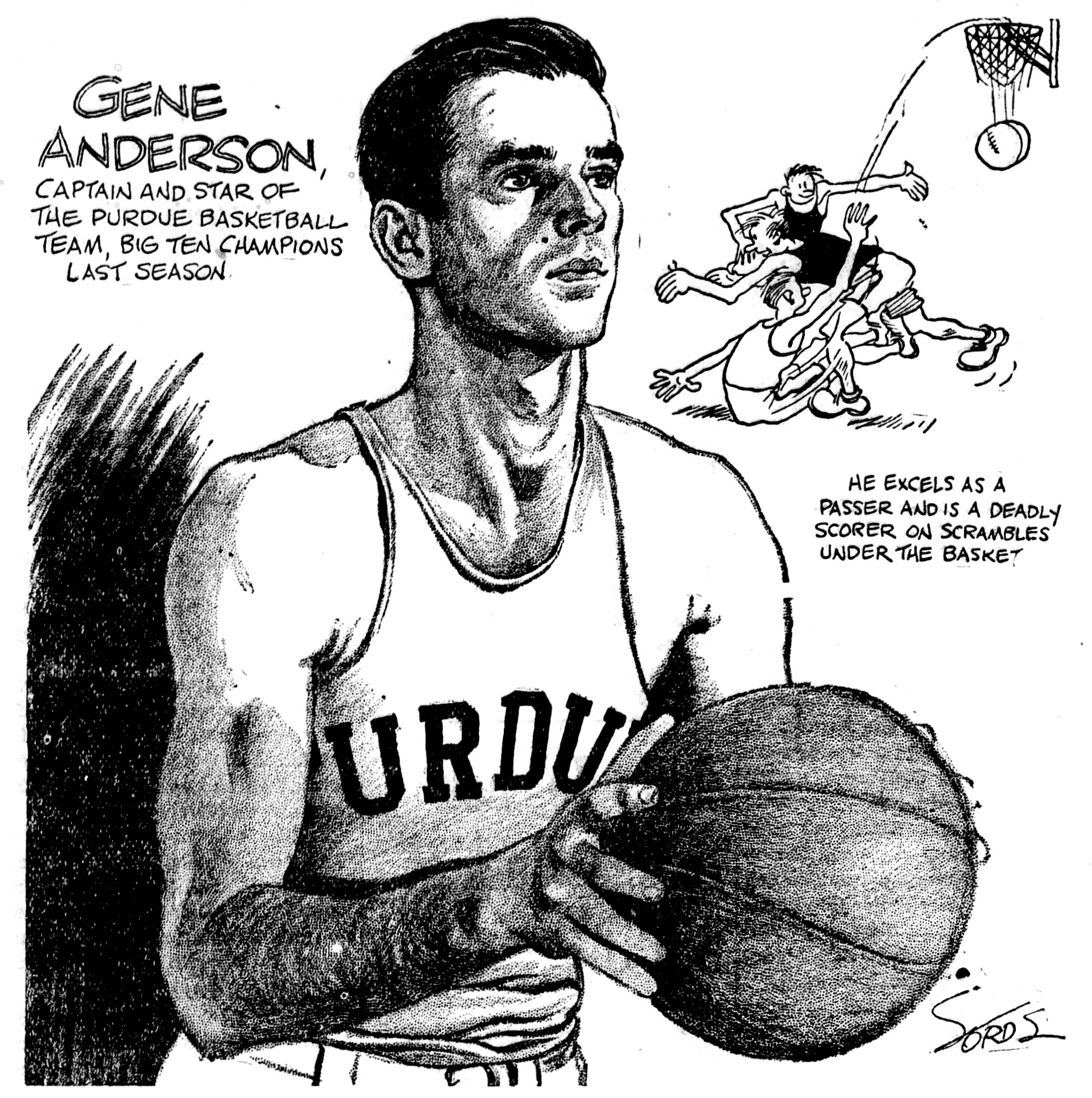
- A sketch of Anderson, circa 1939.

Personal information
- Born: October 5, 1917 Crothersville, Indiana, U.S.
- Died: June 11, 1999 (aged 81) Franklin, Indiana, U.S.
- Listed height: 6 ft 2 in (1.88 m)
- Listed weight: 190 lb (86 kg)

Career information
- High school: Franklin (Franklin, Indiana)
- College: Purdue (1936–1939)
- Position: Guard / forward

Career history
- 1938–1942: Akron Goodyear Wingfoots
- 1942–1943: Akron Collegians

Eugene Irving Anderson (October 5, 1917 – June 11, 1999) was an American professional basketball player. He played for the Akron Goodyear Wingfoots in the National Basketball League and averaged 4.6 points per game.
