= Honey Creek, Sauk County, Wisconsin =

Honey Creek, Wisconsin
- Town
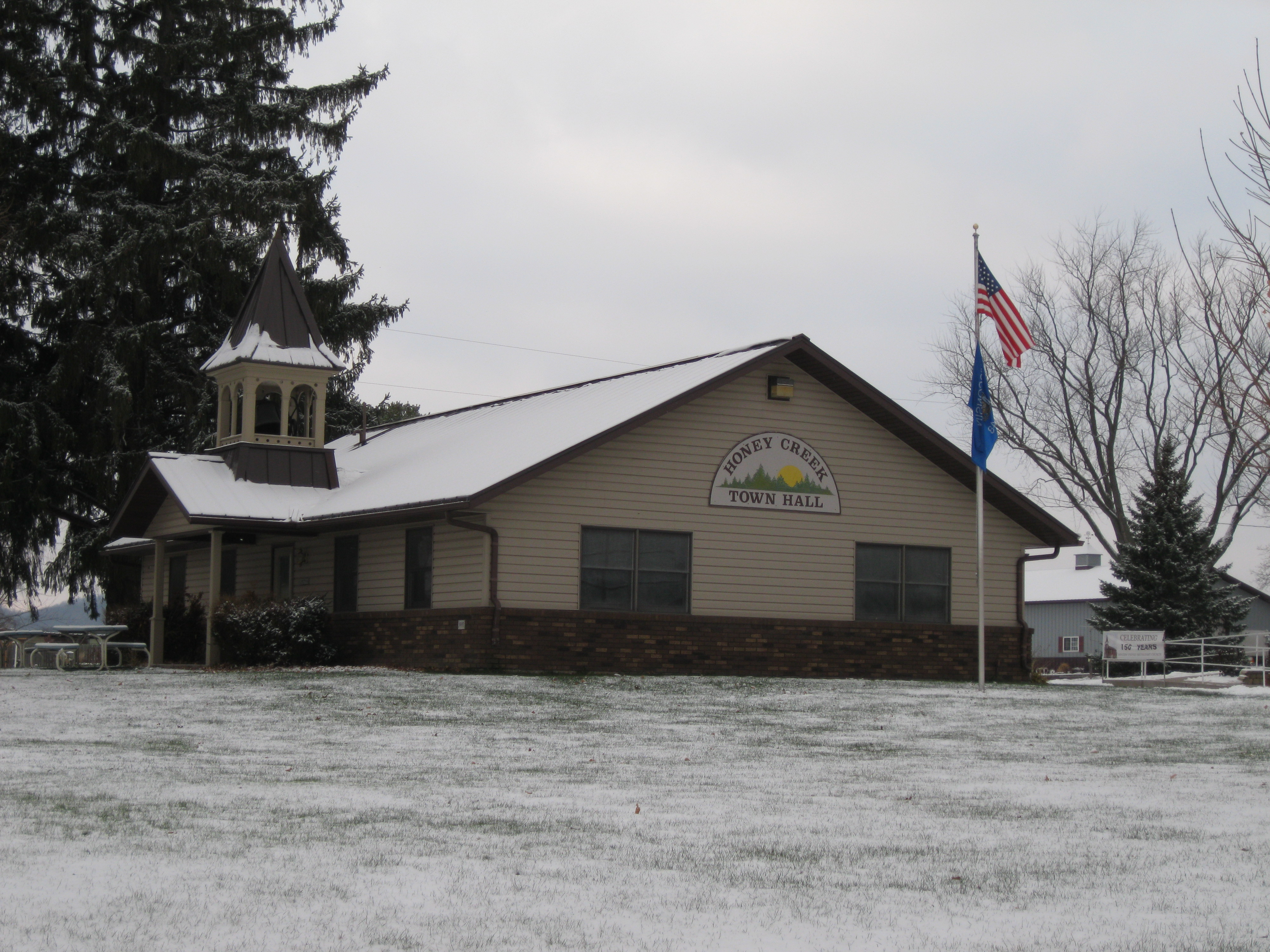
- Honey Creek town hall in Denzer

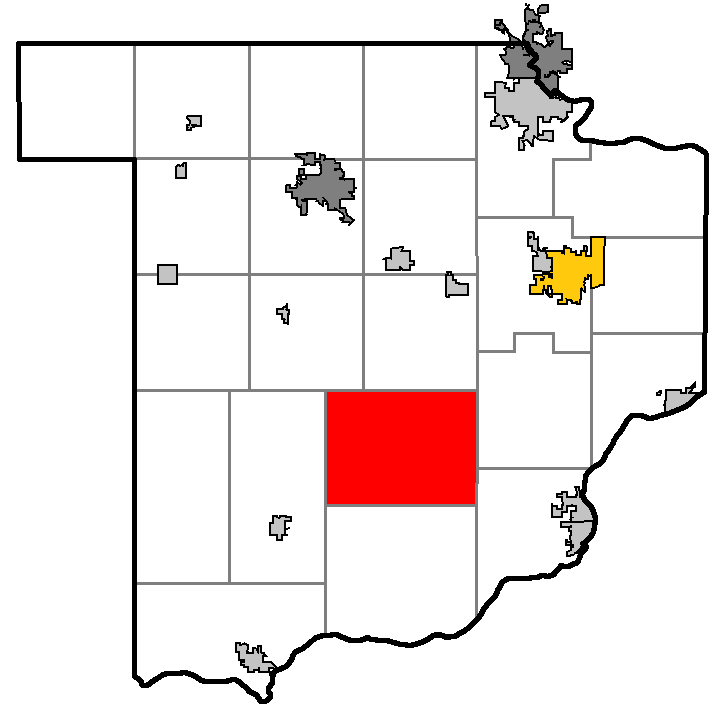
- Location of Honey Creek, within Sauk County, Wisconsin

- Location of Sauk County, Wisconsin
- Coordinates: 43°19′55″N 89°55′19″W
- Country: United States
- State: Wisconsin
- County: Sauk

Area
  - Total: 47.6 sq mi (123.2 km^{2})
  - Land: 47.5 sq mi (123.1 km^{2})
  - Water: 0.039 sq mi (0.1 km^{2})
- Elevation: 1,119 ft (341 m)

Population (2020)
  - Total: 749
  - Density: 15.8/sq mi (6.08/km^{2})
- Time zone: UTC-6 (Central (CST))
  - Summer (DST): UTC-5 (CDT)
- Area code: 608
- FIPS code: 55-35625
- GNIS feature ID: 1583408

Honey Creek is a town in Sauk County, Wisconsin, United States. The town took its name from the nearby stream of the same name. The population was 749 at the 2020 census. The unincorporated communities of Denzer and Leland are located in the town.

== Geography ==
Honey Creek is located in the Baraboo Range, a group of hills characterized by exposed quartzite rock. According to the United States Census Bureau, the town has a total area of 47.6 square miles (123.2 km^{2}), of which 47.5 square miles (123.1 km^{2}) is land and 0.04 square mile (0.1 km^{2}) (0.06%) is water.

== Demographics ==
As of the census of 2000, there were 736 people, 264 households, and 206 families residing in the town. The population density was 15.5 people per square mile (6.0/km^{2}). There were 288 housing units at an average density of 6.1 per square mile (2.3/km^{2}). The racial makeup of the town was 97.42% White, 0.54% Native American, 1.63% from other races, and 0.41% from two or more races. Hispanic or Latino of any race were 1.90% of the population.

There were 264 households, of which 36.4% had children under the age of 18 living with them, 69.3% were married couples living together, 5.7% had a female householder with no husband present, and 21.6% were non-families. 17.0% of all households were made up of individuals, and 8.7% had someone living alone who was 65 years or older. The average household size was 2.79 and the average family size was 3.14.

In the town, the population was spread out, with 26.9% under the age of 18, 7.3% from 18 to 24, 30.8% from 25 to 44, 22.3% from 45 to 64, and 12.6% who were 65 years or older. The median age was 38 years. For every 100 females, there were 117.1 males. For every 100 females age 18 and over, there were 107.7 males.

The median income for a household in the town was $46,923, and the median income for a family was $50,179. Males had a median income of $31,875 versus $21,711 for females. The per capita income for the town was $20,593. About 5.5% of families and 9.6% of the population were below the poverty line, including 12.6% of those under age 18 and 7.5% of those age 65 or over.

== Parks and recreation ==
Natural Bridge State Park is located in Honey Creek. This 530-acre state park has Wisconsin's largest natural arch. Beneath the arch is the Raddatz Rockshelter, a rock shelter once used by Paleo-Indians and now listed on the National Register of Historic Places.

== Notable people ==
- Charles Robert Hager, missionary in China who baptized Sun Yat-sen
- Peter A. Hemmy, member of the Wisconsin State Assembly, born in Honey Creek
- Emanuel L. Philipp, 23rd Governor of Wisconsin, born in Honey Creek
- J. B. Ragatz, member of the Wisconsin State Assembly, born in Honey Creek
