= Ernest William Goodpasture =

American pathologist and physician (1886–1960)

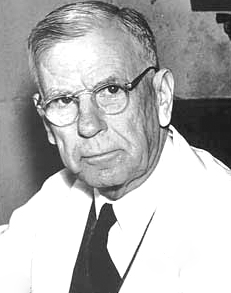
- Ernest Goodpasture (in 1955)
- Born: October 17, 1886; Clarksville, Tennessee, U.S.
- Died: September 20, 1960 (aged 73); Nashville, Tennessee, U.S.
- Education: Vanderbilt University, Johns Hopkins School of Medicine
- Known for: Goodpasture syndrome
- Scientific career
- Fields: Pathology and infectious diseases
- Workplaces: Harvard Medical School, Vanderbilt University, & Armed Forces Institute of Pathology
- Doctoral advisor: George H. Whipple

Ernest William Goodpasture (October 17, 1886 – September 20, 1960) was an American pathologist and physician. Goodpasture advanced the scientific understanding of the pathogenesis of infectious diseases, parasitism, and a variety of rickettsial and viral infections. Together with colleagues at Vanderbilt University, he invented methods for growing viruses and rickettsiae in chicken embryos and fertilized chicken eggs. This enabled the development of vaccines against influenza, chicken pox, smallpox, yellow fever, typhus, Rocky mountain spotted fever, and other diseases. He also identified and described what would become known as Goodpasture syndrome.

== Education and professional career ==
Goodpasture was born in Clarksville, Tennessee, in 1886. He received his B.A. from Vanderbilt University in 1908. In 1912, Goodpasture graduated from Johns Hopkins School of Medicine with an M.D. degree. There, under professors William H. Welch and George H. Whipple, he was subsequently appointed a Rockefeller Fellow in pathology; he held this position from 1912 to 1915. Thereafter, Goodpasture joined the faculty of Harvard Medical School, as an attending pathologist at the Peter Bent Brigham Hospital and assistant professor of pathology in Boston. During that time, Goodpasture took a two-year leave of absence to serve during World War I as a medical officer in the United States Navy. In 1919, he undertook a pathological study of the then-ongoing influenza pandemic. In doing so, he identified a patient whose infection was followed by a peculiar illness that featured hemoptysis and acute glomerulonephritis. That condition, now known as Goodpasture syndrome, is currently recognized as an immunologically mediated disease caused by autoantibodies that bind to pulmonary-alveolar, as well as glomerular-capillary, basement membranes. After leaving Harvard in 1921, Goodpasture worked at the University of the Philippines College of Medicine in Manila. From 1922 to 1924, he was the director of William H. Singer Memorial Laboratories, located in Pittsburgh, Pennsylvania. In 1924, Goodpasture was invited to return to Vanderbilt as professor and chairman of the Department of Pathology, the School of Medicine having been recently reorganized. He accepted, and held that position until 1955. Goodpasture also was the Dean of the Vanderbilt University School of Medicine from 1945 to 1950. After retirement from the latter institution in 1955, he was invited to serve as director of the Armed Forces Institute of Pathology (AFIP) in Washington, D.C. He did so through 1959, helping to reorganize and expand the institute's scientific mission.

Goodpasture's scientific research principally concerned infectious diseases. He contributed to understanding the neural spread of herpes viruses, identification of the mumps virus, development of antiviral vaccines, and studies of rickettsial, fungal, and protozoan human diseases. In a major advance, he introduced the chicken embryo as an experimental host for investigation of microbial infections and for production of vaccines. This technique made possible the development and production of a wide range of vaccines against viral diseases. Goodpasture was a dedicated and patient teacher for medical students, graduate students, and house officers in pathology.

== Awards ==
Goodpasture received several prestigious scientific awards during his career. They included the H. T. Ricketts Award, the Kober Medal, the Kovalenko Medal of the National Academy of Sciences, and the Gold-Headed Cane Award from the American Association of Pathologists. He was on the boards of the Rockefeller Foundation, the National Academy of Science, the American Philosophical Society, the Trustees of Vanderbilt University, the Advisory Committee on Biology and Medicine of the Atomic Energy Commission, and the National Research Council. Goodpasture received honorary doctorates from Yale University, Washington University in St. Louis, the University of Chicago, and Tulane University.

== Death ==
After retirement from the AFIP, Goodpasture returned to Nashville. He died suddenly from a heart attack in September 1960.
