= Vanderbilt University Medical Center =

Hospital in Nashville, Tennessee, U.S.

Geography
- Location: 1211 Medical Center Drive, Nashville, Tennessee, U.S., United States
- Coordinates: 36.142°N 86.801°W

Organization
- Care system: Private
- Type: Teaching
- Affiliated university: Vanderbilt University

Services
- Standards: JCAHO accreditation
- Emergency department: Level I Trauma Center
- Beds: 1,741

Helipads
- Helipad: FAA LID: TN35

History
- Founded: 1874

Links
- Website: vanderbilthealth.com
- Lists: Hospitals in the United States

The Vanderbilt University Medical Center (VUMC) is a medical provider with multiple hospitals in Nashville, Tennessee, United States, as well as clinics and facilities throughout Middle Tennessee, United States. The main facility is on 1211 Medical Center Drive in the city. VUMC is an independent non-profit organization but maintains academic affiliations with Vanderbilt University. As of 2023, the health system (branded Vanderbilt Health as a whole) had more than three million patient visits a year, a workforce of 40,000, and 1,741 licensed hospital beds.

== Overview ==
VUMC comprises the following units:

- Vanderbilt University Adult Hospital
- Monroe Carell Jr. Children's Hospital at Vanderbilt
- Vanderbilt-Ingram Cancer Center
- The Vanderbilt Clinic
- Vanderbilt Bill Wilkerson Center
- Vanderbilt Stallworth Rehabilitation Hospital
- Vanderbilt Psychiatric Hospital
- Eskind Biomedical Library
- Vanderbilt Sports Medicine
- Dayani Human Performance Center
- Vanderbilt Heart & Vascular Institute
- Nashville Biosciences (aka NashBio), a subsidiary spun out from the university in 2018

VUMC also has hospitals, clinics, physician practices and affiliates covering nine hospital systems and 48 hospital locations.

In 2008, the Medical Center moved 23 clinics and administrative offices into the renovated 100 Oaks Mall in the Berry Hill section of Nashville, filling 440,000 square feet (41,000 m^{2}) of space.

VUMC is known for its teaching hospital and its efforts in electronic medical records. As of 2013, its health care providers saw more than 1.6 million patients each year and its hospitals perform more than 35,000 surgical procedures and see 65,000 patients in its Emergency Room. The Medical Center employed 19,600 staff. Vanderbilt biomedical scientists in more than 100 laboratories conducted more than $616 million of federally and corporately sponsored research as of 2013.

In April 2016 Vanderbilt University and VUMC became separate organizations legally and financially. The two organizations cooperate, and VUMC clinicians continue to serve as faculty members at Vanderbilt University School of Medicine and Vanderbilt University School of Nursing.

On, August 1, 2019, VUMC completed its acquisition of Tennova Healthcare-Lebanon, a two-campus facility licensed for 245 beds, from subsidiaries of Community Health Systems, and renamed it to Vanderbilt Wilson County Hospital.

As of 2023, VUMC's health system had 1,741 licensed hospital beds and a workforce of 40,000, with more than 3 million patient visits a year.

== Patient care ==
Vanderbilt operates one of two Level 1 Trauma Center, the only Level 4 Neonatal Intensive Care Unit, and the only Level 3 Burn Unit in its region. The LifeFlight helicopter ambulance service has eight helicopters, operated by Air Methods but staffed with Vanderbilt flight paramedics and nurses, and an airplane transport and makes more than 2,800 flights a year.

Vanderbilt also offers an organ transplantation center. Vanderbilt's first kidney transplant was in 1962; since then there have been more than 3,000 kidneys transplanted at Vanderbilt. VUMC has also had more than 2000 liver transplants and 600 heart and lung transplants. Among Vanderbilt's other transplant milestones were Tennessee's first pancreas transplant in 1985, the first successful heart-lung transplant in the state in 1987, the first pediatric heart transplant in the state in 1987, and the first triple organ transplant of heart, lungs and liver in 2000. In 2024, Vanderbilt set a world record by performing 174 adult and pediatric heart transplants in a year.

The Vanderbilt-Ingram Cancer Center is one of 50 National Cancer Institute-designated cancer centers, and the only one in Tennessee that provides treatment for adult and pediatric cancers. The center is also a member of the National Comprehensive Cancer Network, a non-profit alliance of 21 centers focused on improving quality and efficiency of cancer care.

=== Monroe Carell Jr. Children's Hospital ===
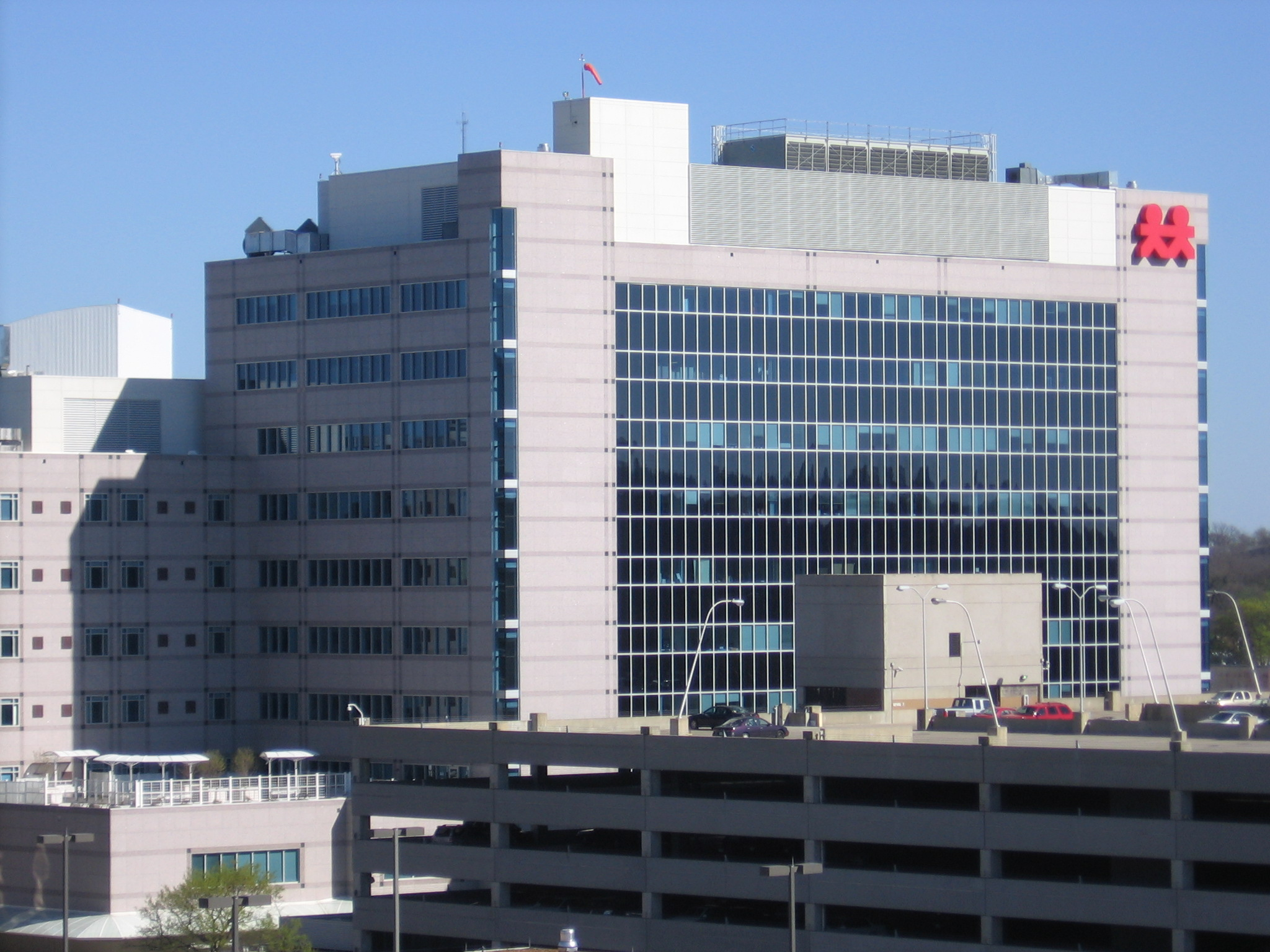
Monroe Carell Jr. Children's Hospital at Vanderbilt

The Vanderbilt Children's Hospital has been in operation since the 1970s, but was housed in the main Vanderbilt hospital until 2004. Monroe J. Carell, Jr., former CEO of Central Parking Corporation, raised $79 million for the construction of a new stand-alone facility, including $20 million from his family's personal donations and additional money secured through fundraising efforts.

== Research ==
VUMC ranks in the top 10 among the 126 medical schools in the United States in receipt of research funding from the National Institutes of Health.

Vanderbilt faculty have won two Nobel Prizes in Physiology or Medicine. In 1971 Earl Sutherland, Jr., received the prize for his discovery of Cyclic AMP. Stanley Cohen received a Nobel in 1986, as he shared the award with Rita Levi-Montalcini of Italy for their discovery of epidermal growth factor, a hormone that can speed up certain biological processes.

Some other important research firsts from Vanderbilt's history:

- In 1933, Alfred Blalock and his research assistant Vivien Thomas conducted pioneering research leading to the first cardiothoracic surgery for infants born with "blue baby syndrome". Thomas and Blalock's work was essential to the development of open heart surgery.
- In the early 1940s, Ernest Goodpasture developed the method of culturing vaccines in chick embryos, which allowed the mass production of vaccines to prevent viral diseases worldwide.
- In the 1950s, Amos U. Christie, chair of pediatrics, led a team that achieved worldwide notice for pioneering work in histoplasmosis.
- Dr [Billy G.] Hudson’s group... discovered the sulfilimine chemical bond. Their report, published in Science magazine in 2009, changed the field of basement membrane biology by debunking the common belief that collagen IV molecules were held together by disulfide bonds."url=Vanderbilt researchers hit ‘home run’

== Education ==
Both the Vanderbilt University School of Medicine and the Vanderbilt University School of Nursing rank in the top 20 in the U.S. News & World Report rankings. The School of Medicine was founded in 1874.

The School of Nursing was founded in 1908. It became a part of the Medical Center in 1984. The School of Nursing phased out its undergraduate nursing degree in 1989, becoming exclusively a graduate school with a mission of educating advanced-level nurses.

== Controversies ==
In March 2014, VUMC was sued by the federal government in a whistle-blower case for a decade-long Medicare fraud scheme.

The university admitted one of its scientists fraudulently falsified six years of biomedical research in high-profile journals.

In May 2015, a federal court ruled Vanderbilt University Medical Center was in violation of the Worker Adjustment and Retraining Notification (WARN) Act for laying off 200 employees without adequate notice and will have to pay out $400,000 pending an appeal.

=== RaDonda Vaught homicide case ===
On March 25, 2022, a jury convicted former Vanderbilt University Medical Center nurse RaDonda Vaught of criminally negligent homicide and impaired adult abuse after she mistakenly administered the wrong medication that killed a patient in 2017. On May 13, 2022, Judge Jennifer Smith ruled that Vaught would not have to spend time in prison, sentencing her instead to three years probation.

=== Transgender clinic ===
VUMC opened a transgender clinic in 2018. Among its treatments, it averaged five gender-affirming surgeries per year to minors over the age of 16 with parental consent since 2018, with none of those patients receiving genital surgery.

In September 2022, right-wing political commentator Matt Walsh made accusations against VUMC and the clinic. Walsh said on his show that VUMC doctors "castrate", "drug and mutilate" children. He said on Twitter that VUMC considered gender-affirming care a "money-maker", that it threatened "consequences" for medical staff who declined to provide care, and that it tried to "enforce compliance" from hesitant parents of transgender youth. Walsh criticized VUMC's "trans buddies" program and called its patient advocates "trans activists". Walsh tweeted about meeting with Tennessee lawmakers on a bill to shut down the clinic. In response, VUMC said that Walsh had "misrepresent[ed] facts about the care the Medical Center provides to transgender patients" and said that "We have been and will continue to be committed to providing family-centered care to all adolescents in compliance with state law and in line with professional practice standards and guidance established by medical specialty societies". The VUMC also removed the webpage for its transgender clinic, and its clinic moved from in-person to telehealth. VUMC reported harassment and threats against its staff, and there were calls for murders and arrests of VUMC doctors in far-right groups on Reddit and 4chan. The New Republic described the accusations made by Walsh as "cherry-picking informational content" and noted that Walsh had singled out doctors by name.

Speaker of the Tennessee House of Representatives Cameron Sexton, a Republican, said that "Your biological sex at birth is your identity", and promised to pass legislation that would ban gender-affirming healthcare for minors. Republican Governor of Tennessee Bill Lee requested an investigation into the hospital. Jace Wilder, Education Manager of the Tennessee Equality Project, said that "They are using trans kids as political pawns. They're saying this is going to protect kids, but this is going to further perpetuate violence."

On October 7, 2022, VUMC announced that it would pause gender-affirming surgeries for minors and review its practices. In response, Tennessee House majority leader William Lamberth, a Republican, said that "This is a win for the safety of our children, but we're committed to ensuring this never happens in Tennessee again".

In June 2023, the Attorney General's office mandated that the VUMC turn over the medical records of all of its transgender patients. The VUMC complied. Some of the patients filed a lawsuit, citing privacy concerns and said that "the hospital waited months before telling patients their medical information was shared".

== Rankings and awards ==
VUMC was ranked as the best hospital in Tennessee in the 2014 annual ranking by U.S. News & World Report. In the 2014 annual rankings by the magazine, the following VUMC specialty programs were nationally ranked: Cancer; Ear, Nose and Throat; Nephrology; Neurology and Neurosurgery; Pulmonology; and Urology. High performing specialty programs were: Cardiology and Heart Surgery; Diabetes and Endocrinology; Gastroenterology; Geriatrics; Gynecology; and Orthopaedics.

Vanderbilt University was named in Fortune's "100 Best Companies to Work For" list for 2009. More than 80% of the university's employees work for the Medical Center. The other rankings VUMC has achieved include being listed in the 100 Top Hospitals by Truven Health Analytics; being listed as among the nation's 100 "Most Wired" hospitals by the American Hospital Association; and listed as one of the "100 Great Hospitals in America" by Becker's Hospital Review.

Vanderbilt is also the home of BioVU, one of the world's largest DNA databanks, which holds more than 170,000 samples and is used to discover new genetic predictors of disease and drug action by scientists worldwide.

The center has also hosted an award since 2006, the Vanderbilt Prize in Biomedical Science, which honors "women who have made significant contributions to the science of medicine".
