= Alan Grodzinsky =

Alan Jay Grodzinsky
- Education: Massachusetts Institute of Technology
- Known for: Osteoarthritis, Biomechanics, Biophysics, Tissue Engineering, Drug Delivery, Transport in biological systems
- Scientific career
- Fields: Biological Engineering, Mechanical Engineering, Electrical Engineering
- Workplaces: Massachusetts Institute of Technology
- Thesis: Electromechanics of deformable polyelectrolyte membranes. (1974)
- Doctoral advisor: James Melcher
- Website: https://continuumlab.mit.edu/

Alan J. Grodzinsky is an American bioengineer and Professor Emeritus of Biological Engineering at the Massachusetts Institute of Technology (MIT). He served as Director of MIT's Center for Biomedical Engineering and held appointments in Biological Engineering, Electrical Engineering and Computer Science, and Mechanical Engineering. He has published more than 360 refereed journal articles and reviews.

== Education ==
He graduated in Electrical Engineering from MIT with a BS and MS in 1971, obtaining a doctorate three years later in Electrical Engineering and Computer Science under the supervision of James Melcher, with a thesis on polyelectrolyte membrane electromechanics.

== Academic career ==
Grodzinsky joined the MIT faculty in 1974 as an Assistant Professor in Electrical Engineering and Computer Science. He subsequently held appointments in electrical engineering, bioengineering and mechanical engineering, becoming a full professor in 1984. He was appointed Professor of Mechanical Engineering in 1992 and became a dual professor of Biological Engineering and Electrical Engineering and Computer Science, with a joint appointment in Mechanical Engineering, in 1998.

He was a founding faculty member of MIT's Department of Biological Engineering and served as Director of the MIT Center for Biomedical Engineering from 1998 to 2023. He also served as Graduate Officer and chair of the Biological Engineering graduate program from 2003 to 2009. He became Professor Emeritus in September 2022.

Grodzinsky has held visiting and advisory appointments at Harvard, Rensselaer Polytechnic Institute, Rush University Medical Center, the University of Bern, the University of Lund and the University of Western Australia. He has also served on editorial boards including the Journal of Orthopaedic Research, Arthritis & Rheumatism, Osteoarthritis and Cartilage and the Biophysical Journal.

He developed core courses in biological engineering at MIT concerning the effects of electrical, mechanical and chemical forces and transport on biological systems and wrote Fields, Forces and Flows in Biological Systems (2011), a textbook addressing these physical principles governing biological tissues.

== Research ==
Grodzinsky's research centers on osteoarthritis, post-traumatic osteoarthritis, cartilage mechanobiology, connective-tissue biomechanics and tissue engineering. His laboratory studies how mechanical forces and inflammatory signals affect cartilage and other musculoskeletal tissues at the tissue, cellular and molecular levels.

His early research examined the transport and electromechanical properties of soft connective tissues. He subsequently developed experimental models of cartilage mechanobiology that demonstrated how different patterns of mechanical loading affect cartilage-cell biosynthesis and matrix degradation. His work showed, for example, that moderate dynamic compression can stimulate cartilage biosynthesis and suppress matrix degradation under certain injury and inflammatory conditions.

Another major area has been molecular and tissue nanomechanics. His group developed atomic-force-microscopy-based methods for measuring the mechanical behavior of cartilage, tendon and extracellular-matrix molecules, including aggrecan and collagen. These studies examined how the molecular structure of the extracellular matrix contributes to the mechanical and transport properties of connective tissues.

Grodzinsky has also investigated cartilage repair and targeted drug delivery. His research has explored tissue-engineering approaches to cartilage regeneration and the use of nanoparticles and other carriers to deliver therapeutics into cartilage, including sustained delivery of dexamethasone for post-traumatic osteoarthritis.

His more recent research has focused on post-traumatic osteoarthritis and joint injury, using multicellular and multi-tissue experimental systems to study interactions among cartilage, bone, tendon and other joint tissues. These models have been used to investigate disease mechanisms, therapeutic responses and the effects of mechanical injury. These systems were launched to the International Space Station for investigations on two flights.

He has published more than 360 refereed journal articles and reviews in these areas.

Awards and honors

- NIH MERIT Award
- Melville Medal, American Society of Mechanical Engineers
- Kappa Delta Prize, American Academy of Orthopaedic Surgeons
- Borelli Award, American Society of Biomechanics
- Distinguished Investigator Award, Orthopaedic Research Society and Orthopaedic Research and Education Foundation
- Lifetime Achievement Award, Osteoarthritis Research Society International
- Outstanding Achievement in Mentoring Award, Orthopaedic Research Society
- Founding Fellow, American Institute for Medical and Biological Engineering
- Life Fellow, Orthopaedic Research Society and International Cartilage Repair Society
- Honorary doctorates from the University of Montreal and the University of Eastern Finland
