= Clinical trials on glucosamine and chondroitin =

Medical research

A significant amount of research has been performed on glycosaminoglycans, especially glucosamine and chondroitin, for the treatment of arthritis. These compounds are commonly marketed as nutritional supplements and numerous 'soft therapeutic claims' are made about their health benefits - especially in aging populations. Since glucosamine is a precursor for glycosaminoglycans, and glycosaminoglycans are major components of cartilage, ingesting glucosamine might nourish joints, and thereby alleviate arthritis symptoms. Authoritative opinions on the actual therapeutic value of these compounds have been very mixed.

Some of the evidence for the effectiveness of glucosamine is disputed. A 2008–2009 review of all known studies of glucosamine supplements for horses, for example, found that almost all studies had failed to meet usual standards and were fatally compromised by basic errors in their execution, including failure to test whether active ingredients were as stated, lack of adequate (or any) control groups or baseline measurements, very small sample sizes, and ignoring prior research or self-evident omissions. The authors highlighted confirmation bias as a significant issue in such studies, in that most studies were undertaken by manufacturers, on products they already produced commercially, and they were usually undertaken to support claims of benefits which could be used to market the product. More recently, other reviews found little evidence that glucosamine and chondroitin supplements were any better than a placebo or at most only slightly better.

Glucosamine sulfate may be efficacious in ways that glucosamine hydrochloride is not. The Osteoarthritis Research Society International advises arthritis sufferers to discontinue glucosamine therapy if they notice no benefit within six months and the National Institute for Clinical Excellence no longer recommends its use. Despite the difficulty in determining the efficacy of glucosamine, it remains a viable treatment option. Similar trials have been done with chondroitin.

== History of trials ==
In general, the clinical trials of the mid-1990s that furnished positive results showing glucosamine efficacy were later deemed to be of poor quality due to shortcomings in their methods, including small sample sizes, short duration, poor retention and controls for drop-outs, and unclear procedures for treatment blinding. At the same time, several independent studies did not detect any benefit of glucosamine supplementation on osteoarthritis.

A Cochrane 2005 meta-analysis of glucosamine therapy for osteoarthritis found that only the Rotta brand of glucosamine appeared to be superior to placebo in the treatment of pain and functional impairment resulting from symptomatic osteoarthritis. However, when the low-quality and older studies were discounted and only those using the highest-quality design were considered, there was no difference from placebo treatment. A second 2005 review of glucosamine clinical trials reached a different conclusion. Published in the Annals of Pharmacotherapy, the authors of this review concluded that "The available evidence suggests that glucosamine sulfate may be effective and safe in delaying the progression and improving the symptoms of knee OA."

A systematic review in 2007 found that effect sizes from glucosamine supplementation were highest in industry-funded studies and lowest in independent studies, which may lead one to believe that bias is responsible for the heterogeneity of the clinical study findings regarding the efficacy of glucosamine. An alternative explanation may be that the two commonly available forms, sulfate and hydrochloride, used interchangeably by the general public and the medical community, appear to have different pharmacologic effects in vivo. Another 2007 review of the available research concluded that there was "compelling evidence" that glucosamine sulfate (but not hydrochloride) slowed the progression of knee and hip osteoarthritis. This finding was confirmed by a 2013 meta-analysis of 19 glucosamine trials which concluded that while neither form of glucosamine appeared significantly more effective than placebo at symptom improvement, glucosamine sulfate alone showed efficacy in improving physical function in knee OA as measured by the Lequesne Index in trials lasting more than 24 months.

In 2006, the U.S. National Institutes of Health (NIH) funded a 24-week, 12.5 million-dollar multicenter clinical trial (the GAIT trial) to study the effect of chondroitin sulfate, glucosamine hydrochloride, chondroitin/glucosamine in combination, and celecoxib as a treatment for knee-pain in two groups of patients with osteoarthritis of the knee: Patients with mild pain (n=1229), and patients with moderate to severe pain (n=354). When the data from both groups were pooled and analyzed, there was no statistically significant difference between groups taking glucosamine HCl, chondroitin sulfate, glucosamine/chondroitin; and those taking an inactive placebo or the positive control, the prescription analgesic celecoxib. The authors of the study analyzed the moderate-to-severe pain group and found that in this group, the combination of glucosamine and chondroitin was more effective at providing pain relief than the positive control with 79% of the glucosamine group reporting at least a 20% reduction in pain compared to 70% for celecoxib and only 54% reporting a similar reduction in the placebo group. However, the researchers caution that these findings should be confirmed with further studies, given the small size of the subgroup. Despite its size and design, the GAIT trial may have also had some important limitations, however. When considering the entire cohort, none of the treatments studied performed significantly better (or worse) than placebo in improving patient WOMAC pain and function scores. In other words, because of the inclusion of both a placebo and a positive control, and the fact that roughly 60% of each treatment group achieved the same level of improvement, it is difficult to conclude anything about the efficacy or non-efficacy of glucosamine in the treatment of knee OA from this study.

In a follow-up study in 2008, 572 patients from the GAIT trial continued their supplementation for 2 years. After 2 years of supplementation with glucosamine and chondroitin sulfate, alone or in combination, there was no benefit in slowing the loss of cartilage, in terms of joint space width, compared to a placebo or celecoxib. As in the original GAIT study, this follow-up study was confounded by unexpected results that made it difficult to conclude anything definitive about the effect of glucosamine on slowing the progression of OA. Even though the glucosamine group showed less than one-tenth the joint narrowing (0.013 mm) as the placebo group (0.166 mm), none of the groups experienced joint space narrowing to the degree the researchers expected (0.4 mm) over the two-year period based on earlier studies of OA disease progression. Thus, while the researchers rightly concluded that no treatment in this study was found to produce a "a clinically important reduction" in joint space width loss none of the participants experienced clinically important progression of their disease during the study period either. In another 2-year follow-up study involving 662 patients from the GAIT trial, published in 2010, there was neither significant pain reduction nor improved function when comparing glucosamine and/or chondroitin to a placebo. However, the positive control also failed to perform significantly better than the placebo in this study.

== Quality of clinical studies of glucosamine and chondroitin supplements ==
Glucosamine supplements are widely used for both human and animal joint conditions, at times supported by clinical studies.

However a 2008/2009 metastudy reviewed all existing studies on the efficacy of glucosamine treatments and supplements for horses, and concluded negatively, that these studies were usually fatally flawed due to confirmation bias (studies are funded by manufacturers with an incentive to show that benefits exist and commercial pressures that disfavor larger and more thorough studies which would be expensive) and fatal flaws in the design of the study which undermined the conclusions.

The authors observed that existing studies of glucosamine products are "usually [undertaken] on products already commercially available and often seeking evidence for efficacy ... but most do not meet a quality standard that provides sufficient confidence in the results". A paper by the same authors at the 4th European Equine Nutrition & Health Congress (2008) concluded that research into glucosamine-based supplements, for horses at least, has so far "failed to produce substantial evidence for the functionality of these products in this species", and that almost every study they had examined had been

compromised to varying degrees by numerous experimental factors including underpowered studies, unbalanced research design, non-existent or inappropriate controls, unclear or non-representative experimental conditions (i.e. models) and uncharacterized or complex, heterogeneous experimental materials".

The most common flaws included:

- Not verifying whether the quantities and condition of active ingredients was as described ("a well-known characteristic of the nutraceuticals industry is one of inconsistent quality control");
- Ignoring known research in the field and standard precautions, such as accounting for quantities available in blood plasma;
- In many of the studies, no reliable control group existed, or there was inadequately controlled control group, or inadequate baseline data, meaning that reliable conclusion could not be drawn about any purported benefits actually resulting from the product. Controls are a fundamental part of such studies, and the authors comment that "many cases of lameness ... improve over time without any treatment at all ... which suggests that the null hypothesis tested in this study had a good chance of being rejected even in the absence of any treatment" and that "having no such controls leaves the authors and readers with no way in which to tease out effects of growth and/or exercise from effects of glucosamine".

David Marlin, a past senior scientist and head of physiology at the Animal Health Trust in England, commented on his website on the evidence concerning glucosamine-based supplements for humans and animals, including a list of studies since 2009. As at 2016 he concludes that some degree of evidence exists for benefits from supplements, and that "[even if] oral joint supplements have little or no efficacy, we might consider that feeding them at least allows owners to feel they are doing something positive for their animals and that any improvement may be due to the placebo effect and therefore there is little risk". However against this he highlights concerns of overdosing, that shark cartilage products may promote rather than reduce inflammation, and produces have been found to be contaminated with steroids. He also states that "on closer scrutiny" studies continue to raise concerns for similar reasons as described in the 2008/2009 study:

...based on simple mistakes such as lack of control groups, lack of blinding (use of a placebo), insufficient power (not enough subjects to demonstrate a significant effect even if one was present) and inappropriate statistics (for example, multiple t-tests without correction or use of parametric statistics on non-normally distributed data). Finally, if a study satisfies all the required criteria, we may still end up with a statistically significant but biologically insignificant finding; for example, a significant increase in range of motion of a joint by 1%...

...research and development investment will at most be modest and in the majority of cases, non-existent. The efficacy of different oral joint supplements will depend on the specific ingredients used and their individual efficacy, the number of different ingredients, the level at which the active ingredients are to be fed, whether the finished product on the shelf actually meets the label claims".

=== Further metastudies ===
Due to the controversy engendered by these results, additional meta-analyses have been undertaken in an attempt to evaluate glucosamine. A 2009 review found little evidence that glucosamine was better than placebo at reversing or restoring degenerative changes to articular cartilage. One published in 2010 in the British Medical Journal arrived at the following conclusions:

Compared with placebo, glucosamine, chondroitin, and their combination do not reduce joint pain or affect the narrowing of joint space. Health authorities and health insurers should not cover the costs of these preparations, and new prescriptions to patients who have not received treatment should be discouraged.

These conclusions, however, are not shared by all researchers in the field. Specifically, the authors of the 2010 BMJ meta-analysis have been criticized for poor methodology by including too many dissimilar studies in their analysis. In a subsequent discussion the editors of the BMJ concluded that, while they still supported the overall results of the study, they no longer accepted the specific conclusions that glucosamine and chondroitin should not be recommended by health authorities or covered by health insurers, stating that these claims "were not directly supported by [the authors'] data".

Nevertheless, in 2012, the U.S. Food and Drug Administration (FDA) maintained its position (first published in a comprehensive 2004 letter) that there is no credible scientific evidence to support the proposed health claims regarding consumption of glucosamine and chondroitin sulfate and reduced risk of osteoarthritis, joint degeneration, and cartilage deterioration.

Also in 2012, a review highlighted the ongoing conflicting clinical data regarding the efficacy of glucosamine concluding both that 1) "...glucosamine sulfate shows an effect size superior to (or at least equal to) the commonly used analgesic or nonsteroidal anti-inflammatory drugs but has no rare or adverse effects" and 2) the majority of clinical trials assessing glucosamine reported a significant number of subjects who failed to respond to treatment, thereby questioning the benefit of glucosamine.

A 2014 review and analysis conducted by the La Universidad del Zulia located in Maracaibo, Venezuela and funded by the Venezuelan government's Technological, Humanistic, and Scientific Development Council concluded that the preponderance of the available evidence indicates that glucosamine, specifically the sulfate form, has disease-modifying effects and provides symptomatic relief for at least some individuals suffering from OA. The report classified glucosamine as a Symptomatic Slow Acting Drugs for Osteoarthritis (SYSADOA) and states:

Although further research is required...glucosamine supplements have been more than sufficiently proven to display overtly beneficial risk-to-reward profiles, and they should remain fundamental components of OA therapy.

A further meta-analysis published in December 2014 by the Parker Institute (Copenhagen, Denmark) sponsored by the Oak Foundation concluded that glucosamine sulfate, but not glucosamine HCl, did have a significant effect on osteoarthritis pain but only when one particular brand was used. Once this effect size was corrected for bias and heterogeneity, the effect size became clinically unimportant.

=== Results ===
Many randomized controlled trials have been conducted with mixed results. These trials have been summarized:

- In 2007, Reichenbach et al. used explicit methods to conduct and report a systematic review of 20 trials and concluded "large-scale, methodologically sound trials indicate that the symptomatic benefit of chondroitin is minimal or nonexistent. Use of chondroitin in routine clinical practice should therefore be discouraged."
- Also in 2007, Bruyere et al. without using explicit methodology for reviewing trials concluded "there is compelling evidence that glucosamine sulfate and chondroitin sulfate may interfere with progression of OA."

The effectiveness of glucosamine is controversial. Most recent reviews found it to be equal to or only slightly better than placebo. A difference may exist between glucosamine sulfate and glucosamine hydrochloride, with glucosamine sulfate showing a benefit and glucosamine hydrochloride not. The Osteoarthritis Research Society International recommends that glucosamine be discontinued if no effect is observed after six months and the National Institute for Clinical Excellence no longer recommends its use although the Arthritis Foundation compares the effectiveness of glucosamine to traditional NSAID therapy. Despite the difficulty in determining the efficacy of glucosamine, it remains a viable treatment option according to some experts.

Chondroitin is not recommended as a treatment for osteoarthritis.

== Guidelines prior to recent studies ==
Prior to publication of the negative review by Reichenbach and the equivocal GAIT trial, clinical practice guidelines recommended the use of chondroitin. The OARSI (OsteoArthritis Research Society International) recommended chondroitin sulfate as the second-most-effective treatment for moderate cases of osteoarthritis (although the guidelines were published in 2008, the developers closed their search date in January 2006 – prior to the GAIT trial). In 2003, the European League Against Rheumatism (EULAR) supported the usefulness of chondroitin sulfate in the management of knee osteoarthritis and granted the highest level of evidence, 1A, and strength of the recommendation, A, to this product.

== GAIT trial (2006–2010) ==
The major trial included in the two reviews above was the Glucosamine/Chondroitin Arthritis Intervention, or GAIT Trial. GAIT was funded by the National Institutes of Health to test the effects of chondroitin and glucosamine on osteoarthritis of the knee. It reported initially in 2006, with further findings in 2008 and again in 2010. This multicenter, placebo-controlled, double-blind, six-month-long trial found that glucosamine plus chondroitin had no statistically significant effect on symptoms of osteoarthritis in the osteoarthritis patients studied. The study, in addition to an inactive placebo, also included an active control, the FDA-approved prescription analgesic drug celecoxib. The researchers found that those taking the active control drug fared no better or worse than those taking glucosamine, glucosamine and chondroitin combined or the inactive placebo.

However, in the moderate-to-severe pain subgroup, the combination of chondroitin and glucosamine was found to be clinically more effective (in 25% of the patients) in treating pain than celecoxib or chondroitin and glucosamine taken individually. Due to small sample sizes in the sub-group (roughly 250 people), the researchers concluded that this needs further validation. The study also found chondroitin sulfate to have no significant effect in reducing joint swelling, effusion, or both. These results indicate that glucosamine and chondroitin do not effectively relieve pain in the overall group of osteoarthritis patients, though it may be an effective treatment for those suffering from moderate-to-severe pain.

In a follow-up study, 572 patients from the GAIT Trial continued the supplementation for two years. After two years of supplementation with glucosamine and chondroitin sulfate, alone or in combination, there was no benefit in slowing the loss of cartilage, in terms of joint space width, when compared to a placebo. However, no patient group, placebo or glucosamine alone, or in combination, experienced joint space width loss at even half the rate expected during this study, making it difficult to assess the clinical effectiveness of any treatment on the progression of OA.

In another two-year follow-up study, there was no significant pain reduction or improved function when compared to either inactive placebo or celecoxib Some of the researchers' ties to Pfizer (which makes celecoxib) have brought into question the validity of the study.

The lead author of the GAIT Trial, Allen D. Sawitzke, MD, expressed his disappointment with unexpectedly equivocal findings of the trial, noting in an interview with the Arthritis Foundation, that because of significant limitations, like a small sample size, the GAIT Trial likely didn't have enough power to determine whether glucosamine and chondroitin are effective treatments for knee osteoarthritis or not.

== The LEGS study (2007–2011) ==
The Long-term Evaluation of Glucosamine Sulfate (LEGS) study ran between 2007 and 2011, to study whether glucosamine sulfate, chondroitin sulfate or a combination of both are effective treatments for chronic knee pain due to osteoarthritis. 502 patients (from 605 enrolled) were followed for two years. The main outcomes were disease progression, as measured by joint space narrowing (JSN) and knee pain (VAS). The combination treatment did result in a small but statistically significant (0.1 mm) decrease in 2-year JSN compared with placebo but there was no difference in JSN between this group and the other treatment groups and no differences between any group for changes in knee pain. In summary, there was no significant symptomatic benefit detected for these dietary supplements, and a longer study would be required to test the efficacy of both supplements combined.

== See also ==
- Chondroitin sulfate
- N-Acetylglucosamine
