= Strnad =

Strnad is a predominantly Czech (feminine: Strnadová) and Slovene surname referring to the yellowhammer or bunting (Emberiza). To a lesser extent, the surname is also found in Czech and Slovene diaspora communities in Australia, Austria, Croatia, Canada, Germany, Slovakia and the United States. Non-standard variations include Sternad, Sternat, Sternot, and Strnat.

== People ==
=== Strnad ===
- Jan Strnad, American writer
- Janez Strnad (1934–2015), Slovene physicist
- Johann Strnad, Austrian footballer
- Justin Strnad (born 1996), American football player
- Marica Strnad Cizerlj (1872–1953), Slovene teacher, poet, and feminist
- Martin Strnad (born 1974), Czech sport shooter
- Miloslav Strnad (born 1981), Czech footballer
- Oskar Strnad (1879–1935), Austrian architect
- Stanislav Strnad (1930–2012), Czech film director
- Tomáš Strnad (born 1980), Czech footballer
- Trevor Strnad (1981–2022), vocalist of heavy metal band The Black Dahlia Murder
- Valerija Strnad (1880–1961), first Slovene female medical doctor
- Zvonko Strnad (1926–1979), Croatian footballer

=== Strnadová ===
- Andrea Strnadová (born 1972), Czech tennis player
- Jana Strnadová (born 1972), Czech tennis player
- Michaela Strnadová-Mrůzková (born 1979), Czech canoeist
- Milena Strnadová (born 1961), Czech athlete
- Vendula Strnadová (born 1989), Czech footballer

=== Sternad ===
- Dagmar Sternad, German-American scientist
- Lamar Sternad (born 1977), American politician
- Maja Sternad (born 2003), Slovene footballer
- Peter Sternad (1946–2022), Austrian athlete
- Rudolph Sternad (1906–1963), American art director

== See also ==
- 6281 Strnad, asteroid
