= John M. Sedivy =

John Sedivy
- Born: 1955
- Education: University of Toronto (BS)
- Alma mater: Harvard University
- Awards: Ontario Scholar (1974); Presidential Young Investigator (1990); Andrew Mellon Award (1991); NIH MERIT Award (2009)
- Scientific career
- Fields: Aging; Oncogenes; Epigenetics; Chromatin
- Institutions: Brown University
- Thesis: Regulation of fructose-I,6-bisphosphatase activity : a mutational analysis (1985)
- Doctoral advisor: Dan Fraenkel
- Other academic advisors: Phillip Allen Sharp

John Michael Sedivy is the Hermon C. Bumpus Professor of Biology and a professor of Medical Science at Brown University. He is listed as a F1000 Prime faculty member and on Who's Who in Gerontology. He has published over 130 original articles.

He wrote the first book on gene targeting in 1992. In 2006, he published the first comprehensive in vivo quantification of cellular senescence in aging primates. That year, his lab also discovered how (through the Polycomb pathway) c-Myc contributes to the regulation of chromatin states. His research has found that mice missing one copy of the Myc transcription factor live longer than wild-type mice.

He is co-Editor-in-Chief of the journal Aging Cell, and is chair of the 2015 Gordon Research Conference on the Biology of Aging.

== Bibliography ==
=== Books ===
- Sedivy, J. M., & Joyner, A. L. (1992). Gene targeting. WH Freeman and company. ISBN 9780195099683

=== Selected publications ===
- Sedivy, J. M., & Sharp, P. A. (1989). Positive genetic selection for gene disruption in mammalian cells by homologous recombination. Proceedings of the National Academy of Sciences, 86(1), 227–231.

== Awards ==
- 1974 Ontario Scholar
- 1981 Ryan Foundation Fellow
- 1989 March of Dimes Basil O'Connor Starter Scholar
- 1990 Presidential Young Investigator
- 1991 Andrew Mellon Award
- 2006 Hermon C. Bumpus Endowed Chair in Biology, Brown University
- 2007 Senior Research Scholar in Aging, Ellison Medical Foundation
- 2009 NIH MERIT Award, National Institute on Aging
- 2011 Glenn Award for Research in Biological Mechanisms of Aging
- 2015 Chair, Gordon Research Conference on the Biology of Aging
