= Denise C. Park =

American neuroscientist

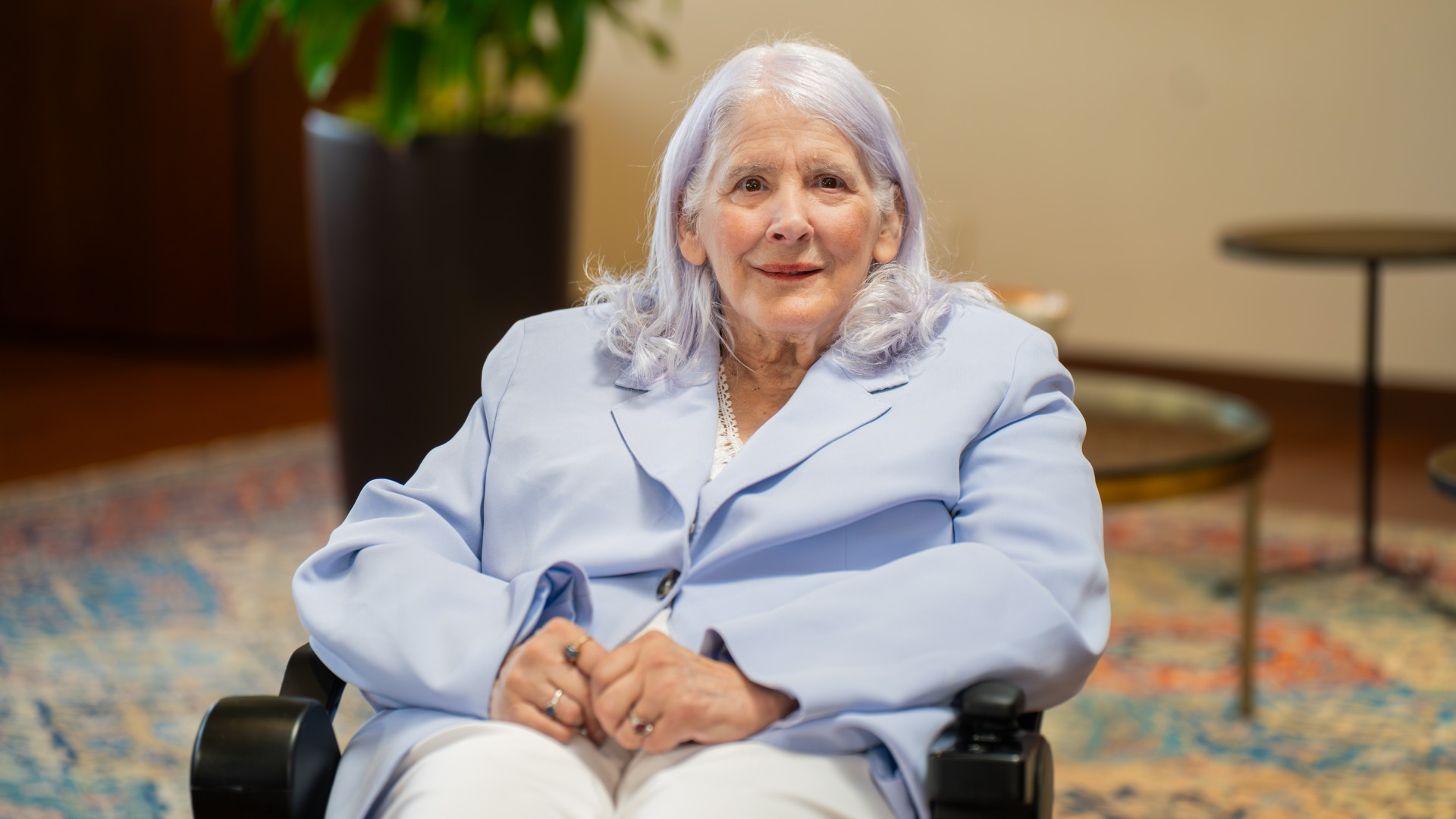
- Denise C Park 2025
- Born: October 2, 1951; Dearborn, MI
- Died: February 1, 2026 (aged 74)
- Education: Albion College; SUNY Albany
- Known for: Research on aging-associated brain changes and adaptations
- Awards: National Institute of Health MERIT Award, named a top 1000 female scientist of the world
- Scientific career
- Fields: neuroscience
- Workplaces: University of Texas Dallas, Aging Mind Lab, The Center for Vital Longevity

Denise C. Park (née Cortis; October 2, 1951 - February 1, 2026) was an American neuroscientist, the head of the Aging Mind Lab, the Principal Investigator of the Dallas Lifespan Brain Study (DLBS), and a Distinguished University Chair of the School of Behavioral and Brain Sciences at The University of Texas at Dallas. Park's research focused on how the brain changes and adapts with age. She investigated the neuroscience of memory and aging, and the impact of stimulation on maintaining brain health. Her research also sought to identify a "neural signature" in middle-aged adults which would indicate who would be at increased risk of less adaptive cognitive aging.

== Early life and education ==
She was born on October 2, 1951 in Dearborn, Michigan and grew up in the Detroit suburb of Allen Park, Michigan where she lived with her parents and five siblings. She attended local parochial schools and graduated in 1969 from St. Frances Cabrini High School. Her family's financial means were modest.

Park initially became interested in the neuroscience of memory in her first semester at Albion College where she graduated with a bachelor's degree in psychology summa cum laude and Phi Beta Kappa. She earned her Ph.D. in experimental psychology from the State University of New York at Albany at the age of 25.

== Career ==
Park began as an assistant professor at the University of North Carolina at Charlotte, where she worked for eight years, before moving to the University of Georgia, where she studied the effects of context on memory and aging. From 1985 to 1994, Park was awarded over $1 million in funds for her research, primarily from The National Institute on Aging.

In 1995, she moved to the University of Michigan at Ann Arbor, held a faculty position as Professor of Psychology and began to transition her research program to fMRI studies of the function of the aging brain and cognition with an emphasis on visual memory. Her research was supported during this period of time with over $2 million in NIH funding. Park then moved to the University of Illinois at Urbana-Champaign from 2002 to 2006, continuing her focus on visual memory and aging until 2006, when she began to focus on dedifferentiation and memory in the aging brain.

In 2007, Park moved once again to the University of Texas at Dallas where she developed the Scaffolding Theory of Aging and Cognition with her colleague Patricia Reuter-Lorenz. She developed an interest in amyloid and tau PET imaging and received a National Institute of Health MERIT Award to conduct the Dallas LifeSpan Brain Study. Her research integrated environmental context and interventions with findings of brain structural and functional changes associated with aging and cognition. While at the University of Texas, she established the Aging Mind Lab. and the Center for Vital Longevity. She retired from the Aging Mind Lab and The University of Texas at Dallas on May 31, 2025.

Park's research focused on how the brain changes and adapts with age. Her research investigated the neuroscience of memory and aging, and the impact of stimulation on maintaining brain health. Park also sought to identify a "neural signature" in middle-aged adults which would indicate who would be at increased risk of less adaptive cognitive aging. She studied the impact of culture on cognition and investigated the neural mechanisms that underlie effects of culture. Park's research also explored the influence of everyday life factors on cognition e.g., how the demands of daily routines affect cognitive performance, examined challenges for aging adults such as remembering (or forgetting) to take medications, and explored the consequences of disorders like rheumatoid arthritis and fibromyalgia on memory. Park is an author of over 200 publications and is one of Research.com's Best Female Scientists of 2023.

== Research Initiatives ==
=== Aging Mind Lab ===
The Aging Mind Lab is researching how aging affects brain structure and function, the earliest possible detection of Alzheimer's disease, and how to intervene to slow the brain's decline. AML trains postdoctoral researchers, doctoral students and research assistants. AML was renamed the Park Aging Mind Laboratory in Park's honor.

=== The Center for Vital Longevity ===
Founded by Park in 2010, the Center researches changes in the brain that occur with aging, means of predicting who is at risk of cognitive decline and interventions that could slow such decline. It includes eight research labs and collaborates with many other labs and research institutions throughout the world.

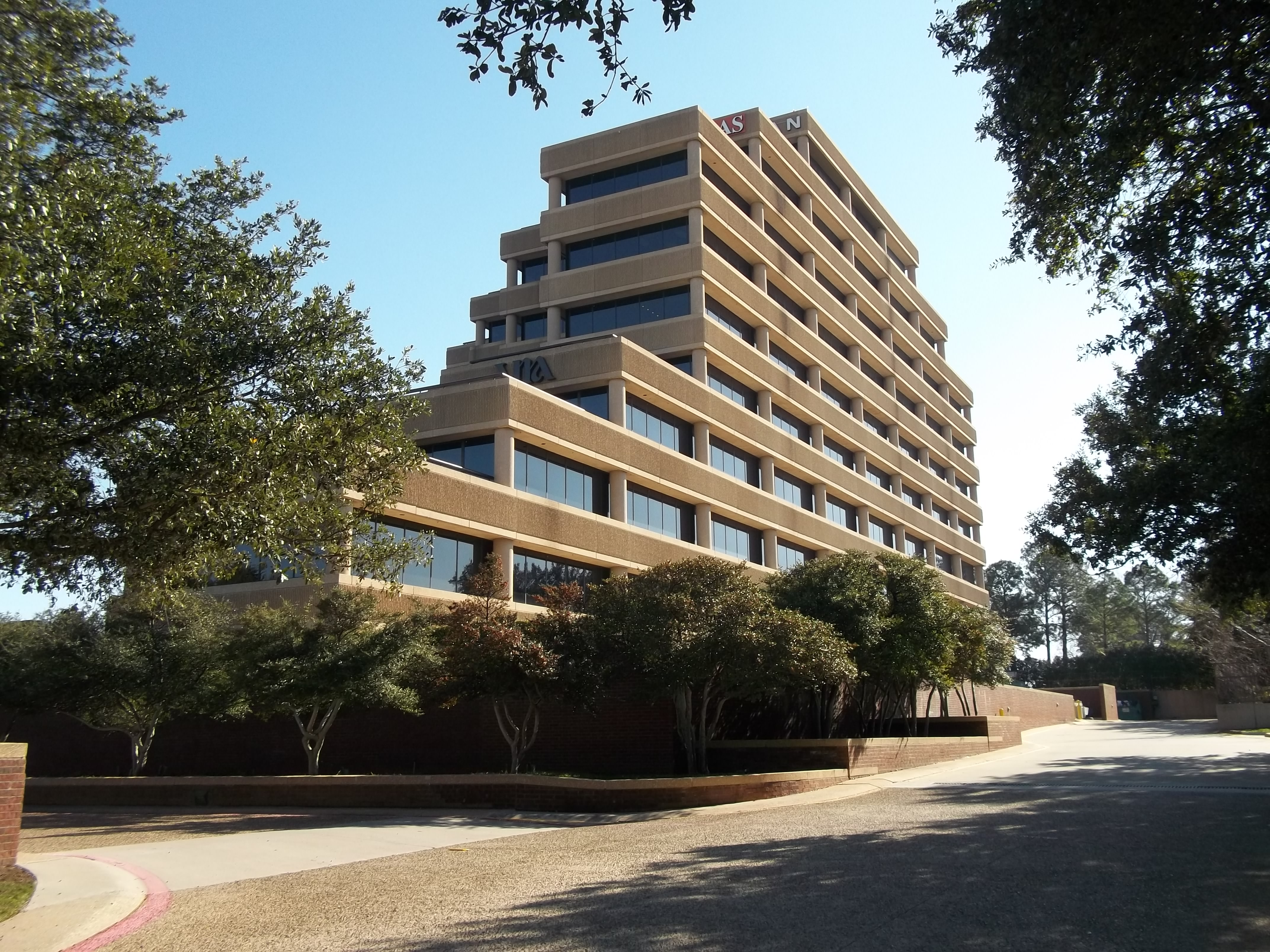
Center for Vital Longevity

=== Dallas Lifespan Brain Study ===
DLBS seeks to detect a "neural signature" in middle-aged adults that will be predictive of healthy or unhealthy brain aging and to identify who is at risk of Alzheimer's Disease long before symptoms manifest themselves. Two preliminary findings of the DLBS include that a busy lifestyle may be linked to improved brain function in old age, especially regarding working memory, vocabulary, and reasoning; and that amyloid buildup decreases recall and recognition memory independent from the age group of the subject. Busy lifestyles may protect the brain.

=== Scaffolding theory of aging and cognition ===
In collaboration with Patti Reuter-Lorenz, Park proposed a conceptual framework: The Scaffolding Theory of Aging and Cognition, a theory which continues to evolve based on new research on neurocognitive aging. Park's work indicated that new neural circuits are created in the brains of older adults to compensate for impairments associated with aging. One goal of the research was to identify these compensatory changes in order to predict the risk of cognitive decline long before it occurs.

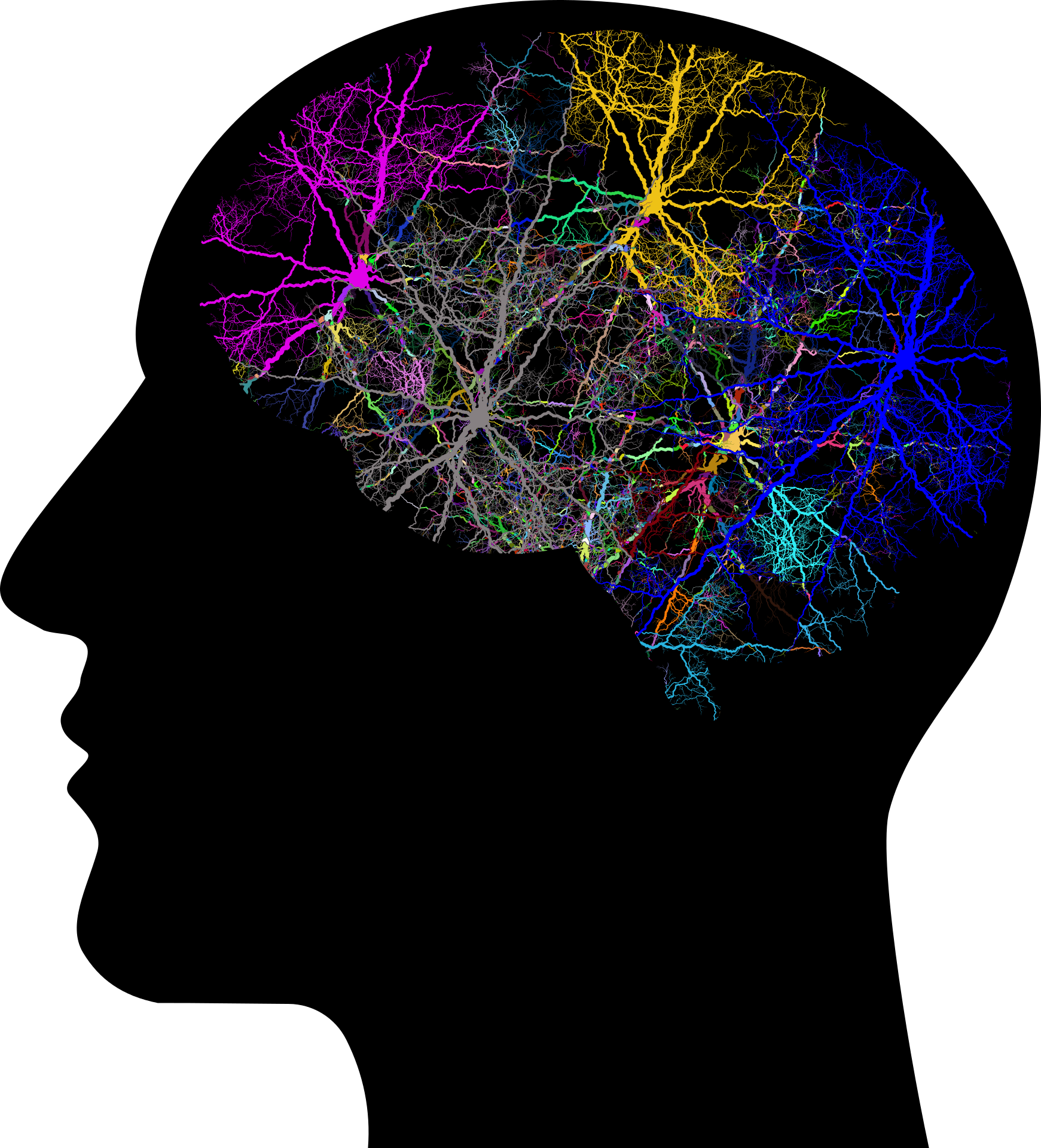
Multicolored connections within a mind

=== The Synapse Project ===
The Synapse Project supported the proposition that participating in mentally challenging leisure activities can lead to improved cognitive function in older adults. Mentally challenging activities utilized in the Synapse project included learning digital photography or quilting in a group setting in order to boost cognitive abilities. Her research explored the brain changes that accompany these improvements. Park also worked on ways to improve medication adherence by supporting cognition, demonstrating cognitive benefits of formal training on use of tablets.

=== Dallas Aging and Cognition Conference ===
Park established the Dallas Aging and Cognition Conference (DACC) in 2010, a biennial international conference held in Dallas at which researchers present findings on aging and cognition.

== Personal life ==
Park was married to William Brian Park for 18 years and they had two children, Rob and Colleen. She had three grandchildren who affectionately referred to her as "Didi." Following her retirement, she enjoyed spending time with her grandchildren and attending their concerts and sporting events despite her health issues. Hobbies included engaging in intellectual discussions on a range of topics and reading spy and mystery novels. She retired from the University of Texas on May 31,2025. Park died on February 1, 2026.

== Awards and honors ==
- Phi Beta Kappa Honor Society
- Fellow, American Psychology Association
- William Owens Award given to the outstanding social and behavioral researcher at the University of Georgia, 1995
- Distinguished Alumni Award, 1997, Albion College
- Faculty Research Award, 1998, University of Michigan
- Distinguished Contribution Award to Psychology of Aging, Division 20, Adult Development and Aging, August 2002, American Psychological Association
- NIH MERIT AWARD Neuroimaging Dedifferentiation in the aging mind, 2006 2015, NIH
- Best Article Award, 2008, Journal of Consumer Research, Association for Consumer Research
- Distinguished Mentor Award in Psychology of Aging, Division 20, Adult Development and Aging, 2015, American Psychological Association
- Fellow for the American Association for the Advancement of Science
- Federal Research Innovation and ExpeNditures Dynamo (FRIEND) of the Office of Research, March 2020, The University of Texas at Dallas
- Delivered 2020 Annual Polykarp Kusch Lectures, highest faculty honor at UT Dallas, April 2020, University of Texas at Dallas
- Named in 2022 and 2023 as a Top 1000 Female Scientist in the World by Researchgate.
