= Zahniser =

Zahniser is a surname. Notable people with the surname include:

- Howard Zahniser (1906–1964), American environmental activist
- Nancy Zahniser (1948–2016), American pharmacologist
- Paul Zahniser (1896–1964), American baseball pitcher
