= The Center for Vital Longevity =

Research center on cognitive neuroscience of aging

Center for Vital Longevity
- Established: 2010 (16 years ago)
- Research type: Age-Related Cognitive Decline, Neuroscience of Aging
- Director: Michael D. Rugg
- Location: Dallas, Texas, U.S.
- Operating agency: University of Texas at Dallas
- Website: cvl.utdallas.edu

Center for Vital Longevity (CVL) is a research center of the University of Texas at Dallas. CVL houses scientists studying the cognitive neuroscience of aging and ways to maintain cognitive health for life. Researchers at the CVL also investigate how to slow cognitive aging and methods for the early detection of age-related neurodegenerative disorders, such as Alzheimer's disease. Other research includes studies investigating the cognitive neuroscience of memory, and other fundamental cognitive processes.

== History ==
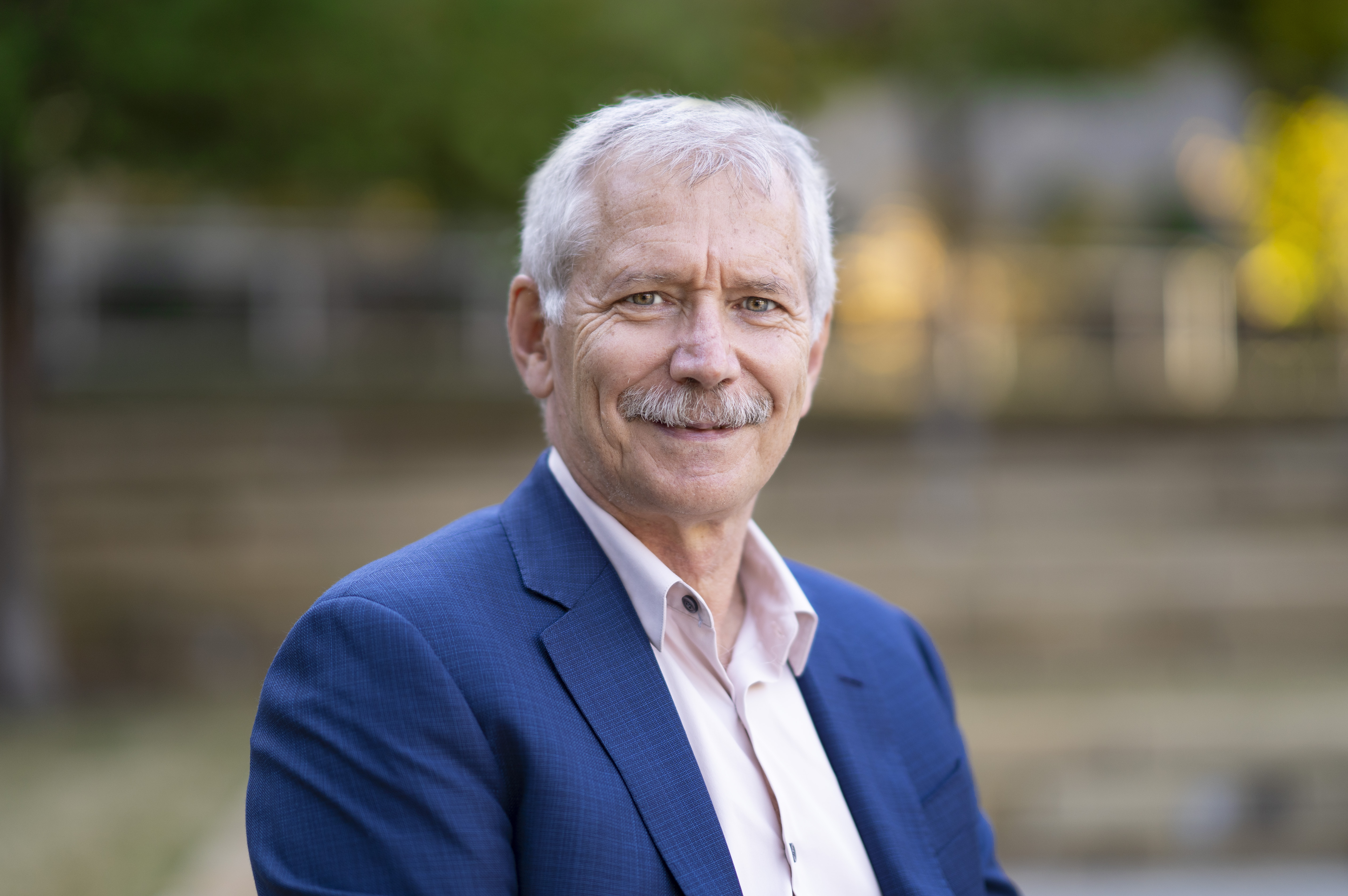
Michael D. Rugg, Director of the CVL

Founded in 2010 by Denise Park, the current director of research, the Center was joined by current director Michael D. Rugg in 2011. Both Park and Rugg are fellows of the American Association for the Advancement of Science (AAAS) and the Association for Psychological Science and hold distinguished chairs in the UT Dallas School of Behavioral and Brain Sciences. Seven full-time faculty belong to the Center, with each faculty member leading a research group comprising a mixture of postdoctoral fellows, graduate students and research assistants.

Center researchers are supported by several competitively reviewed research grants. These grants fund recently completed and ongoing research programs. Among these are the “Synapse Project,” led by Park, which tested the hypothesis that leading an engaged lifestyle facilitates brain health and may slow down the process of normal cognitive aging, as well as two large-scale studies examining brain structure and function across the course of a healthy lifespan.

Research articles by Center scientists have appeared in such peer-reviewed scientific journals as Proceedings of the National Academy of Sciences of the United States of America, Neuron (journal), Nature Neuroscience, Journal of Cognitive Neuroscience, Journal of Neuroscience, and Neuropsychologia.

== Research ==
Scientists at the Center for Vital Longevity are engaged in a variety of research studies aimed at understanding memory, cognitive aging, and Alzheimer’s Disease. Recent CVL studies use structural and functional neuroimaging technologies to understand changes that occur in the brain over a lifetime and how these changes affect specific cognitive abilities and behaviors The Center’s laboratories include:

Aging Mind Lab	Led by Denise Park, the lab studies the same participants over many years as part its Dallas Lifespan Brain Study (DLBS), a large-scale longitudinal research project designed to characterize neural and cognitive aging across the entire adult lifespan from age 20 to 90. The DLBS focuses on predicting the cognitive future of healthy adults by imaging amyloid plaques associated with Alzheimer’s Disease that many healthy people carry. Supported by an NIH MERIT award, as well as funding from Avid Radiopharmaceuticals, the lab images amyloid deposits using florbetapir in healthy adults. Findings were featured at the 2014 International Alzheimer’s Association Conference held in Copenhagen A second major study, The Synapse Project, has found that engaging in mentally demanding leisure activities like quilting, photography, or learning iPad apps, supports memory function in older adults. Both the DLBS and The Synapse Project are funded by the National Institute on Aging and involve collaboration with other CVL faculty. Park participates extensively in NIH review panels and has chaired for nine years the International Scientific Review Committee (Beirat) for the Max Planck Institute for Human Development in Berlin, Germany.) Another area of recent inquiry for the lab is a research program that examines cultural differences in cognitive and neural aging, specifically, how immersing in a cultural context could influence both structural and functional circuits of the brain.
Functional Neuroimaging Memory Lab	Led by Center Director Michael D. Rugg, this lab focuses on understanding the neural circuits that support the encoding and retrieval of memories, and how these circuits vary in their function across the adult lifespan. With funding from the National Institute of Mental Health and the National Institute on Aging, Rugg and his laboratory employ the methods of functional and structural MRI, electroencephalography and transcranial magnetic stimulation. The lab’s research addresses several of questions, including whether brain regions involved in successful retrieval differ in the time-courses of retrieval-related neural activity they manifest, and how neural activity linked to successful memory encoding varies with age. Rugg is editor-in-chief of the international journal Neuropsychologia, and was appointed in 2014 as a standing member of the Neurobiology of Learning and Memory Study Section of the National Institutes of Health. He is the former chair of the Cognition and Perception Study Section
Cognitive Neuroimaging Lab	Led by Dr. Gagan Wig, the Cognitive Neuroimaging Laboratory uses a combination of structural and functional brain imaging measurements to understand the organization of large-scale human brain connectivity networks, and determine how these networks change over the adult lifespan. The laboratory’s research program utilizes complex network science to further understand the brain basis of healthy and pathological aging. A number of inter-institutional research collaborations allow the researchers to focus on questions related to both aging and psychiatric disorders in large samples of participants (e.g., Alzheimer’s Disease and Major Depressive Disorder). A 2014 paper published by the group in the Proceedings of the National Academy of Sciences revealed novel observations related to how the brain operates on a network level, and of understanding the brain basis of individual differences in memory function among individuals aged 20 to 89. In addition to giving a number of invited lectures to both the general public and scientific audiences, Wig serves on the editorial board of the scientific journal NeuroImage. Dr. Wig joined the CVL in 2013 from Washington University in St. Louis, where he completed a post-doctoral fellowship working with the Human Connectome Project.
Lifespan Neuroscience and Cognition Lab	Led by Chandramallika Basak, the Lifespan Neuroscience and Cognition Laboratory focuses on the interplay between attention and memory, and the effects of cognitive training, including video games and memory exercises, in young and older adults. In particular, she and her team are currently testing a new model of working memory that emphasizes the role of attentional control and long-term memory. The lab is also determining specific conditions under which the processing capacity can be expanded (e.g., probe predictability, illusory conjunctions and inter-hemispheric connections, hours of practice), while exploring the biomarkers and neural correlates of complex skill learning and working memory. The goal is to determine the best strategies to improve cognition through working memory or game training. In 2014, her lab received a Darrell K. Royal Research Fund for Alzheimer’s Disease award, a three year-grant totaling $165,000 to support research into mild cognitive impairment (MCI) and how acquiring skills with video games can be associated with improved cognitive performance. The funds extend her cognition work into new populations of older adults. Dr. Basak’s proposal was one of five research proposals recommended in Texas for the grant by an outside panel of peers led by Ronald C. Petersen, M.D., Ph.D., director of the Mayo Clinic’s Alzheimer’s Disease Research Center.
Neuroimaging of Aging and Cognition Lab	Led by Dr. Kristen Kennedy, the lab investigates how the structure and the function of the normal aging brain intersect to affect how we age cognitively. The lab also investigates genetic factors that influence these relationships with the aim of determining who ages with minimal cognitive decline versus those who have a more pathological outcome. The laboratory studies use neuroimaging techniques such as functional and structural MRI to investigate properties of grey matter (e.g., cortical thickness measures) and white matter (e.g., white matter connectivity) structure and brain function as well as neuropsychological and cognitive performance tests. The laboratory’s research is funded through a National Institute on Aging grant, and supplemented by foundation grants and private gifts.
Human Aging Lab	Led by Dr. Karen Rodrigue, the Human Aging laboratory studies the role of vascular risk in neural and cognitive aging. She currently serves as the primary investigator for a National Institutes of Health Pathway to Independence grant awarded to top junior scientists in the United States. Her work also focuses on health factors such as hypertension and how high blood pressure can influence aging and the deposition of beta amyloid in the brain, a protein associated with the development of Alzheimer’s Disease. Supported by funding from UT Dallas, and the provision of the imaging agent florbetapir from Eli Lilly, Inc., her laboratory studies the relationship between brain iron accumulation and cognitive decline in older adult. Her lab is also investigating links to brain iron accumulation and the accumulation of beta amyloid. The Human Aging Laboratory uses a variety of methods to assess brain and cognitive aging, including structural and functional MRI and PET imaging. In 2014, Dr. Rodrigue was named a “Rising Star” by the American Psychological Society.
Aging Well Lab	Led by Dr. Kendra Seaman, the Aging Well Lab is the latest addition to the Center for Vital Longevity. The lab's research is dedicated to using basic and translational scientific research studies to promote health and wellbeing across adulthood. The lab uses a variety of behavioral, modeling, and neuroimaging techniques to better understand how the mind and the brain changes as people get older.

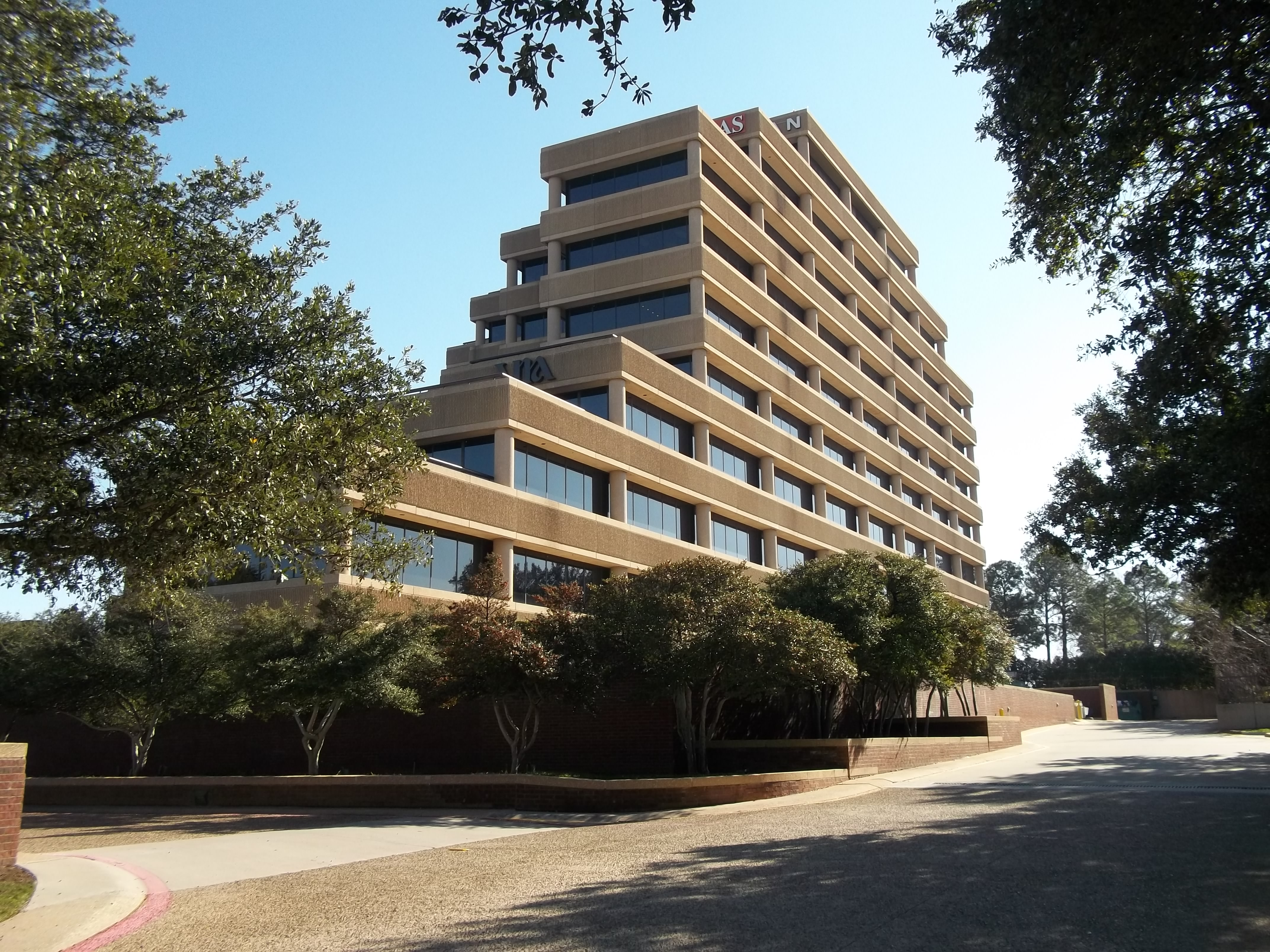
The Center for Vital Longevity building

== Advisory council ==
The Center for Vital Longevity has an Advisory Council consisting of roughly 20 members, each serving three-year terms. The goal of the Advisory Council is to enhance the Center’s development and help promote its research on the aging mind. Council members are committed to the identification, cultivation, solicitation and stewardship of donors and potential donors, including corporate partners, foundations, individuals and others.

== Facilities ==
The Center’s facilities, in Dallas, Texas, include several research laboratories, including those dedicated to EEG and trans-cranial magnetic stimulation (TMS). Investigators conduct functional and structural neuroimaging studies at the Advanced Imaging Research Center (AIRC) on the nearby campus of the University of Texas Southwestern Medical Center part of a collaborative enterprise between UT Dallas, UT Arlington and UT Southwestern.
