= Cindy L. Ehlers =

Neuroscience researcher

- Education: University of California, Davis (PhD) University of California, Davis (BA)
- Known for: Depression and Alcoholism Research
- Scientific career
- Workplaces: University of California Los Angeles, The Salk Institute, University of Pittsburgh (adjunct faculty), University of California San Francisco (adjunct faculty), University of California San Diego (adjunct faculty), The Scripps Research Institute,

Cindy L. Ehlers (born 1951) is an American neuroscientist and professor in the Department of Neuroscience at The Scripps Research Institute in La Jolla, California. She is recognized for her research on the genetic and environmental factors influencing the risk of depression and alcoholism, with a particular focus on mental health in minority populations, including American Indian and Mexican American communities. Ehlers has also contributed to the fields of neuroendocrinology and epilepsy and has authored over 300 peer-reviewed and cited publications.

== Early life and education ==
Cindy L. Ehlers was born in Oakland, California. She and her brother were the first in their family to pursue higher education, and she is the first in her extended family to earn a doctoral degree. She received a Bachelor of Science in physiology from the University of California, Davis in 1973, followed by her Ph.D. in physiology 1977 conducting research on the causes of epilepsy under the supervision of Eva and Keith Killam. She then completed postdoctoral training at the University of California, Los Angeles, in the laboratory of Charles Sawyer, where she began studying neuroendocrinology and its relationship to epilepsy.

In 1979, Ehlers joined Floyd Bloom’s laboratory at The Salk Institute as a research fellow. There, she investigated the role of stress hormones in the development of epilepsy and began her work in mental health research. She joined The Scripps Research Institute in 1983 and was promoted to professor in 2008.

Ehlers has received several honors, including a National Institutes of Health (NIH) MERIT Award. She has served on the Advisory Council for the National Institute on Alcohol Abuse and Alcoholism and on the council of the American College of Neuropsychopharmacology. She has also held adjunct professorships in psychiatry at the University of Pittsburgh and the University of California, San Diego.

== Research ==
Ehlers' research focuses on the biological, genetic, and sociocultural factors contributing to the development of major mental health disorders, particularly alcoholism and major depression. As a MacArthur Foundation network scientist, she developed the "social zeitgeber" hypothesis, which proposes that life events involving social disruption—such as divorce, bereavement, or childbirth—can disturb biological rhythms and trigger depression in vulnerable individuals. In collaboration with David Kupfer at the University of Pittsburgh, Ehlers investigated sleep disturbances associated with depression, contributing to the development of a related hypothesis concerning rapid eye movement (REM) latency. Her work has also explored the roles of neuropeptides and stress.

Ehlers is recognized for her innovative use of brain wave analysis in psychiatric research. Her studies have identified potential biomarkers for suicide through electroencephalographic (EEG) data. In the field of alcoholism, her research spans a wide range of topics, including the neurophysiological effects of alcohol, the role of neuropeptides, fetal alcohol syndrome, early onset of binge drinking, and the impact of alcohol on adolescent brain development.

A significant portion of Ehlers' work has focused on the genetic and environmental factors influencing alcohol use and dependence in minority populations, including Asian, African American, Mexican American, and American Indian communities. Her studies have examined hypotheses such as the "firewater myth," the "fat-sparing gene," and the "depression-dark side" theory in relation to alcohol use among American Indians. These investigations have revealed differences among ethnic groups in alcohol-metabolizing enzymes, neuroimmune responses, subjective and physiological reactions to alcohol, and the influence of cultural factors such as historical trauma and acculturation stress. Ehlers has also led intervention and prevention initiatives aimed at reducing alcohol use in American Indian communities, with a particular focus on adolescents.

== Awards and honors ==
- Thurman Award, UNC Bowles Center for Alcohol Studies
- National Institutes of Health (NIH) Merit Award
- Wendy and Stanley Marsh 3 Endowed Lectureship in Pharmacology and Neurochemistry of Substance Abuse/Addiction Disorders
- Research Society for Alcoholism 2014 Distinguished Researcher Award
- Research Society for Alcoholism 2020 Henri Begleiter award for excellence in Research
