= Delaware Valley University =

Private university in Doylestown, Pennsylvania, US

Coordinates: 40.297°N 75.157°W

- Former names: National Farm School (1896–1948); National Agricultural College (1948–1960); Delaware Valley College of Science and Agriculture (1960–1989); Delaware Valley College (1989–2015)
- Type: Private university
- Established: 1896; 130 years ago
- Endowment: $30.9 million (2020)
- President: Benjamin E. Rusiloski
- Undergraduates: 1,777 full-time
- Postgraduates: 401
- Location: Doylestown, Pennsylvania postal address, U.S.
- Colors: Green & gold
- Nickname: Aggies
- Mascot: Ram
- Website: delval.edu

Delaware Valley University (DelVal) is a private university in Doylestown Township and New Britain in Pennsylvania, with a Doylestown postal address. Founded in 1896, it enrolls approximately 2,178 students on its suburban, 570-acre campus. DelVal offers more than 28 undergraduate majors, 12 master's programs, a doctoral program, and adult education courses.

== History ==
Delaware Valley University opened in 1896 as the National Farm School and offered a three-year curriculum teaching "science with practice" on the school's own farm in Doylestown, Pennsylvania. Its founder and first president, Joseph Krauskopf, was an activist Reform rabbi who, inspired by discussions with Leo Tolstoy, hoped to train Jewish immigrants to the United States as farmers. In its early years the school's main private funder was the Federation of Jewish Charities of Philadelphia, but the institution also received funding from the Commonwealth of Pennsylvania and was open to men from all ethnic and religious backgrounds. It first admitted women in 1969.

The school opened with only two teachers and eight students, but by 1904 under the directorship of John Hosea Washburn enrollment had grown to 45. Following the Second World War, the school became a four-year college and added additional academic programs, changing its name to Delaware Valley College of Science and Agriculture (1960). It added its first graduate programs in 1998.

In 2011, the college dedicated a 398-acre Gemmill Campus in Jamison, Pennsylvania, after a gift from the Gemmill family of land and money in order to further the college's strategic plan.

In December 2014, the college was granted university status. A few months later, its name changed to Delaware Valley University on April 8, 2015.

== Enrollment ==
In 2022, the university enrolled 1,777 undergraduate and 401 graduate students.

== Academics ==
The university is organized into three schools: School of Agriculture and Environmental Science, School of Business, Arts and Sciences, and School of Graduate and Professional Studies.

DelVal, as it is commonly called, had a for-credit employment program that required students to work 500 hours in an area of their major; however, this program is now evolving into a more comprehensive experiential learning program, called E360. The program is part of the university's legacy of linking theoretical learning with practical training. Each department at the university is incorporating E360 into its curriculum.

Many graduates of Delaware Valley University take positions with the pharmaceutical and food industries, work in government or business, go on to become veterinarians or start their own companies.

=== Undergraduate ===
Delaware Valley University offers bachelor's degree programs and associate degree programs in three schools: the School of Agriculture and Environmental Sciences, the School of Business and Humanities, and School of Life and Physical Sciences. It also offers non-major programs and pre-professional programs.

DelVal also offers an Honors Program that gives students the opportunity to have smaller classes, individualized their program, study more closely with faculty, and study abroad.

=== Graduate ===
The School of Graduate and Professional Studies offers master's degree programs as well as a doctoral degree in educational leadership.

=== Continuing and Professional Studies ===
The Office of Continuing and Professional Studies offers several for credit degrees and certificates along with noncredit options.

== Campus life ==
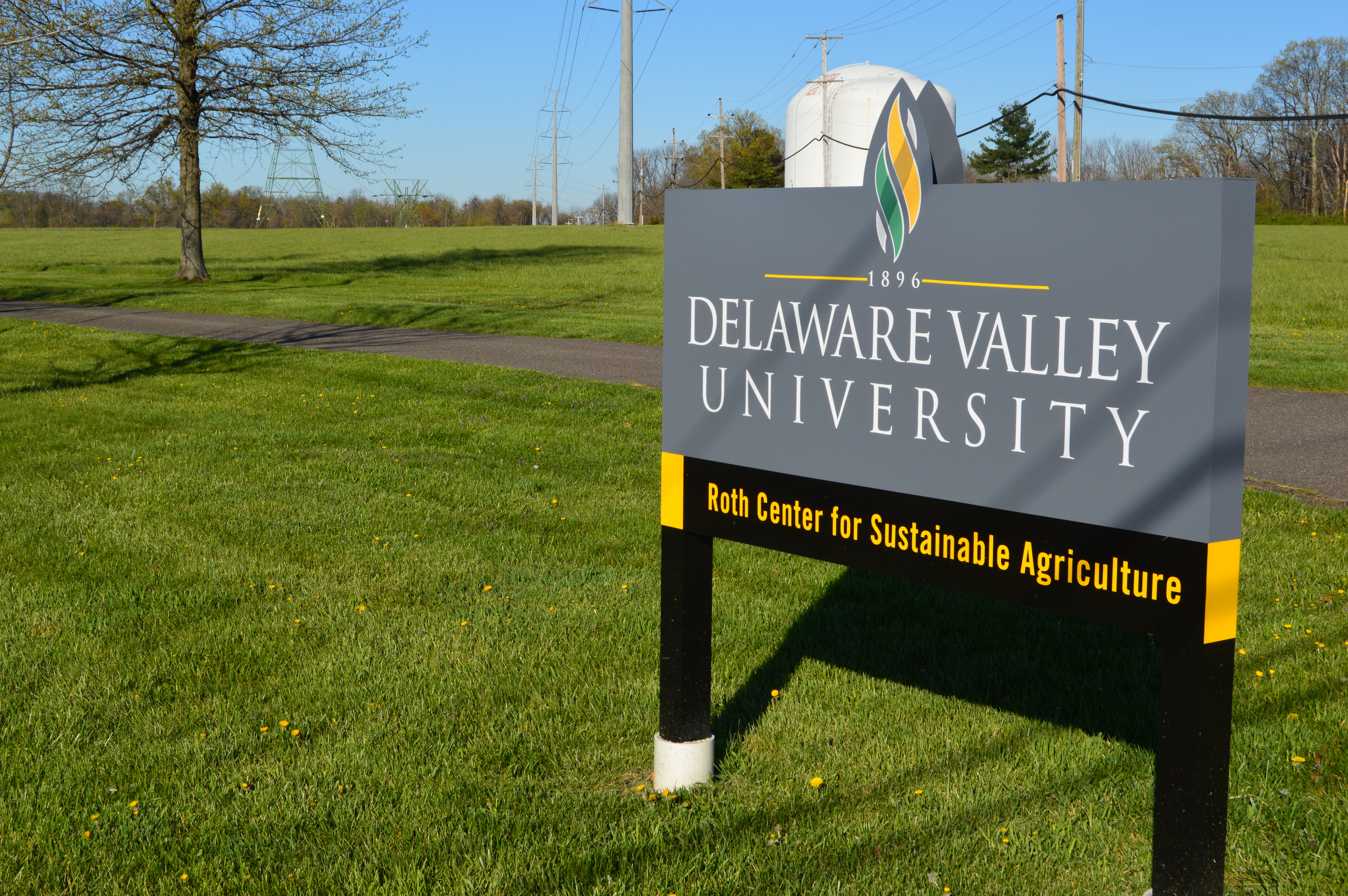
Roth Center for Sustainable Agriculture

The campus has nine residence halls. All entering full-time freshmen live on campus for their first two years at DelVal. In subsequent years, students may choose to continue to live on campus or to explore living more independently off-campus.

The university has over 70 clubs and organizations. These include pre-professional organizations, interest related organizations, cultural and identity organizations, honor societies, student government and many others.

== Rankings ==
- The Princeton Review named Delaware Valley University to the 2019 Best in the Northeast list. The university has been named as a top educational institution by The Princeton Review for the past nine consecutive years.
- U.S. News & World Report ranked Delaware Valley College #19 in its 2015 edition of Best Colleges in Regional Colleges (North).

== Athletics ==
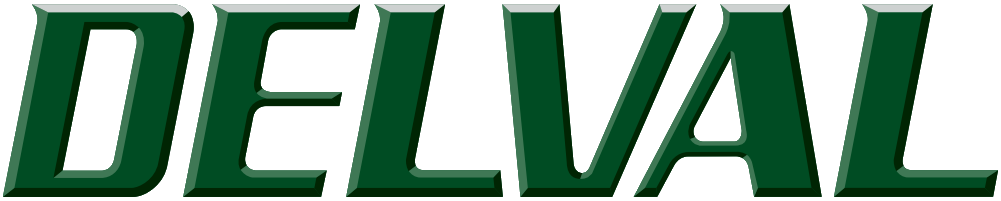
DelVal athletics wordmark

DelVal teams are nicknamed the Aggies. The university fields 27 men's and women's teams in Division III of the NCAA. DelVal is affiliated with the MAC Freedom of the Middle Atlantic Conferences.

Men's Sports: baseball, basketball, cross country, football, golf, lacrosse, soccer, tennis, track and field (indoor & outdoor), and wrestling.

Women's Sports: basketball, cheerleading, cross country, field hockey, golf, lacrosse, soccer, softball, tennis, track and field (indoor & outdoor), volleyball, and wrestling.

DelVal has three co-ed program, equestrian - dressage, equestrian - hunt seat, and e-sports. The school is a member of the Intercollegiate Horse Show Association (IHSA), where members can compete in both Hunt Seat and Western shows. In addition, dressage riders can compete in Intercollegiate Dressage Association (IDA) shows. The school is also home to a vaulting team.

Delaware Valley University has produced 12 individual national champions in its athletic history. The Aggies have had 146 student-athletes earn All-America honors based on their performance at an NCAA Championship or as selected by an organization officially recognized by the NCAA. In addition, DelVal has 13 Academic All-Americans and 30 Scholar All-Americans to its credit, rewarding those student-athletes that have had great success both in their respective sport and in the classroom.

== Points of interest ==
- Henry Schmieder Arboretum
- Roth Living Farm Museum

== Notable alumni ==
- Jacob Joseph Taubenhaus, 1904, plant pathologist
- Charles R. Wira, 1962, physiologist and neurobiologist
- Ted Cottrell, 1969, professional football player and coach
- Kenneth Roux, 1970, biologist
- Jim Foote, NFL quarterback
- Laura Owen, 1979, business executive and entrepreneur
- Rasheed Bailey, 2015, professional football player
- Aaron Wilmer, 2015, professional football player
