= Margaret C. Wu =

American biostatistician

Margaret C. Wu is a Chinese-American biostatistician who worked at the National Heart, Lung, and Blood Institute on topics including the analysis of clinical trials, longitudinal studies, and censored data.

== Education and career ==
Wu earned a Ph.D. in 1973 from Johns Hopkins University, with the dissertation Asymptotic Behavior of Posterior Distributions and Bayes's Estimators for the Independent Not Identically Distributed Case, supervised by Charles A. Rohde.

She worked in the Office of Biostatistics Research at the National Heart, Lung, and Blood Institute, part of the National Institutes of Health (NIH), from 1973 until her retirement in 2001.

== Recognition ==
Wu won the National Institutes of Health MERIT Award in 1989. She was elected as a Fellow of the American Statistical Association in 1994.
