= Barbara B. Kahn =

American endocrinologist and professor

- Education: Stanford University; University of California Berkeley; University of California Davis
- Scientific career
- Fields: endocrinology
- Workplaces: Harvard Medical School; Beth Israel Deaconess Medical Center; National Institutes of Health; Broad Institute

Barbara B. Kahn is an endocrinologist and the George Richards Minot professor of medicine at Harvard Medical School. She is also the vice chair for research strategy in the department of medicine at Beth Israel Deaconess Medical Center, and was formerly the chief of the Division of Endocrinology, Diabetes, and Metabolism at Beth Israel Deaconess. Her research focuses on insulin resistance and type 2 diabetes.

== Early life and education ==
Kahn graduated from Stanford University with a B.A. in 1972 and an M.D. in 1977. She also earned an M.S. from University of California Berkeley in 1975. She trained in internal medicine and endocrinology at the University of California Davis. She then did a fellowship at the National Institutes of Health from 1982 to 1986.

== Career ==
Kahn began as an instructor at Harvard Medical School. In 1989, she became an assistant professor. From 1990 to 2000, she was chief of the diabetes unit at Beth Israel Deaconess Medical Center. In 2000, she was made full professor and chief of the Division of Endocrinology, Diabetes and Metabolism. She served in this position until 2011, when she became vice chair for research strategy.

She became an associate member of the Broad Institute in 2006 and was promoted to institute member in 2018.

Since 2013, she has been the director of the Beth Israel Deaconess Department of Medicine Foundation board. She currently serves on the NIH/NIDDK National Advisory Council. She is on the editorial boards of Cell Metabolism and the Proceedings of the National Academy of Sciences.

=== Research ===
Her research focuses on insulin resistance and type 2 diabetes. Her lab has identified signaling pathways involved in insulin sensitivity, weight maintenance, and regulation of hunger. She has also been involved in research on the GLUT4 transporter and its role in the regulation of glucose tolerance.

== Awards and honors ==
- 1994 Elected to the American Society for Clinical Investigation
- 1995 Eli Lilly Award for Outstanding Scientific Achievement, American Diabetes Association
- 2001 Elected to the Association of American Physicians
- 2005 Elected to the National Academy of Medicine
- 2006 National Institutes of Health MERIT Award
- 2006 Elected to the American Association for the Advancement of Science
- 2016 Banting Medal for Outstanding Scientific Achievement, American Diabetes Association
- 2017 Elected to the National Academy of Sciences
- 2019 FASEB Excellence in Science Award
- 2019 American Academy of Arts and Sciences Fellow
