= Henry Schmieder Arboretum =

Arboretum and collection of gardens in Doylestown, Pennsylvania, United States

- Interactive map of Henry Schmieder Arboretum
- Type: Arboretum; Public garden
- Location: Delaware Valley University, Doylestown, Pennsylvania
- Area: 40 acres (16 ha)
- Website: Official website

The Henry Schmieder Arboretum is a 40 acres (16 ha) arboretum and collection of gardens located across the campus of Delaware Valley University, Doylestown Township, Pennsylvania. It is open daily without charge.

The arboretum's tree and garden collections include:

- 1920s Cottage Garden
- Beech Collection
- Bieberfeld Oak Woods
- Gazebo Annuals Garden
- John Herbst Winter Walk
- Hillman Family Garden
- Iris and Peony Garden (redesigned in 2004–05)
- Lois Burpee Herb Garden
- Martin Brooks Conifer Collection
- Rose Garden (redesigned in 2003)
- Rock Garden
- Woodland Walk

Other trees on the campus include Cladrastis kentukea, Fraxinus Americana, Gleditsia triacanthos inermis, Quercus phellos, etc.

== See also ==
- List of botanical gardens in the United States
