= Andrew D. Luster =

American immunologist

- Education: Duke University, BS; Rockefeller University, PhD; Cornell University Medical College, MD
- Scientific career
- Fields: Immunology
- Workplaces: Harvard Medical School; Massachusetts General Hospital

Andrew D. Luster is the Persis, Cyrus and Marlow B. Harrison Professor of Medicine at Harvard Medical School, and the Chief of the Division of Rheumatology, Allergy and Immunology at Massachusetts General Hospital. He is Director of its Research Center for Immunology and Inflammatory Diseases, and a member of the Dana-Farber/Harvard Cancer Center's Cancer Immunology program.

His laboratory is interested in defining the roles of chemokines and lipid chemoattractant molecules in autoimmune, allergic, and infectious diseases.

== Education ==
Luster received his B.S. degree in 1981 summa cum laude from Duke University and was awarded the prize for the most distinguished graduating biology major. He then entered an NIH-funded Medical Scientist Training Program, receiving his Ph.D. from Rockefeller University in 1987 and his M.D. from Cornell University Medical College in 1988. He received the New York State Annual Medical School Research Award for his Ph.D. studies under the mentorship of Jeffrey Ravetch and Zanvil Cohn. Luster pursued his residency in medicine and fellowship in infectious diseases at Massachusetts General Hospital, followed by a post-doctoral fellowship in Philip Leder's laboratory in the Department of Genetics at Harvard Medical School.

== Career ==
In 1994, Luster established his laboratory at MGH, and in 2000, he was appointed Chief of the Division of Rheumatology, Allergy and Immunology, and the Director of the Research Center for Immunology and Inflammatory Diseases. He is the Persis, Cyrus and Marlow B. Harrison Professor of Medicine at Harvard Medical School and the E. Alexandria and Michael N. Altman Chair in Immunology at Massachusetts General Hospital.

Over the past three decades, Luster has been intimately associated with the birth, growth and development of the chemokine field. He has been a pioneer in this field and has made multiple seminal contributions to understanding the roles of this important family of immunoregulatory chemotactic cytokines in health and diseases since his initial discovery of CXCL10 (IP-10). His laboratory has helped define how chemokines function in immune cell trafficking necessary to generate innate and adaptive immune responses in host responses to infectious pathogens and cancer, as well as in the pathogenesis of immune and inflammatory diseases, including autoimmune allergen diseases, such as arthritis and asthma.

== Awards and honors ==
Luster has received numerous awards and honors, including a Damon Runyon-Walter Winchell Postdoctoral fellowship, a Cancer Research Institute Investigator Award, a Culpeper Medical Scientist Award, an NIH MERIT Award, and the 2011 Lee C. Howely Sr. Prize for Arthritis Research from the Arthritis Foundation. He has been elected to the American Society for Clinical Investigation and the American Association of Physicians.

== Publications ==
According to Google Scholar, Luster's most cited paper, the review "Chemokines-chemotactic cytokines that mediate inflammation" has been cited 3729 times as of March 2016. His most cited research papers, "MCP-1 and IL-8 trigger firm adhesion of monocytes to vascular endothelium under flow conditions" and "Gamma-interferon transcriptionally regulates an early response gene containing homology to platelet proteins" have been cited 1100 and 796 times, respectively. Luster's H index is 109: 110 papers of his have been cited 109 times or more.
