= Kung Hsiang-fu =

Kung Hsiang-fu or Kong Xiangfu (Chinese: 孔祥復; 4 September 1942 – 17 June 2019) was a Chinese molecular geneticist, molecular oncologist, and virologist. He was elected an academician of the Chinese Academy of Sciences in 1999.

== Biography ==
Kung was born on 4 September 1942 in Chongqing, Republic of China. He graduated from National Chung Hsing University in Taiwan in 1963, and earned his Ph.D. from Vanderbilt University School of Medicine in 1969.

From 1971 to 1986, Kung worked in molecular biology research at Hoffmann-La Roche in the United States. At Roche he helped develop the world's first human interferon medicine. He made several inventions for which Roche was awarded patents.

From 1986 to 1998, he was Chief of the Laboratory of Biochemical Biology at the National Cancer Institute of the National Institutes of Health. He received the NIH MERIT Award in 1998.

In 1999, he was appointed Professor and Director of the Institute of Molecular Biology at the University of Hong Kong. He was elected an academician of the Chinese Academy of Sciences that same year. After 2004, he served as Professor of Virology and Director of the State Key Laboratory in Oncology in South China at the Chinese University of Hong Kong. Kung was also a professor at the Sun Yat-sen University Cancer Center in Guangzhou and the Army Medical University in Chongqing.

On 17 June 2019, Kung died of an illness in Chongqing, at the age of 76.
