= Kenneth Roux =

American academic biologist

Kenneth Roux is an American academic biologist whose research addresses structural analysis of the AIDS viruses HIV-1 and SIV, and the antibodies that neutralize them, as well as food-allergen characterization and immunoassay development. He is the Kurt G. Hofer Professor of Biological Science at Florida State University (FSU), where he is affiliated with the Institute of Molecular Biophysics. He has been a member of FSU's biological science faculty since 1978. Roux received his B.S. degree from Delaware Valley College (now Delaware Valley University) in 1970 and then attended Tulane University, from which he received his M.S. in 1972 and his Ph.D. in 1974.

Roux was a member of the research team (along with his research associate Ping Zhu) that used negative stain electron microscopy and cryo-electron microscopy coupled with tomography to produce the first detailed 3D images of the surface of the AIDS viruses, revealing spike proteins. They show that the three gp120 proteins in each spike consist of a lobed head and a three-legged stalk - and use comparisons with atomic structures to gain insight into the mechanism of fusion. The images produced in his research of HIV structure and genome provide important insights for the development of vaccines that will thwart infection by targeting and crippling the sticky HIV-1 spike proteins.
