= James L. Manley =

British biologist

James L Manley
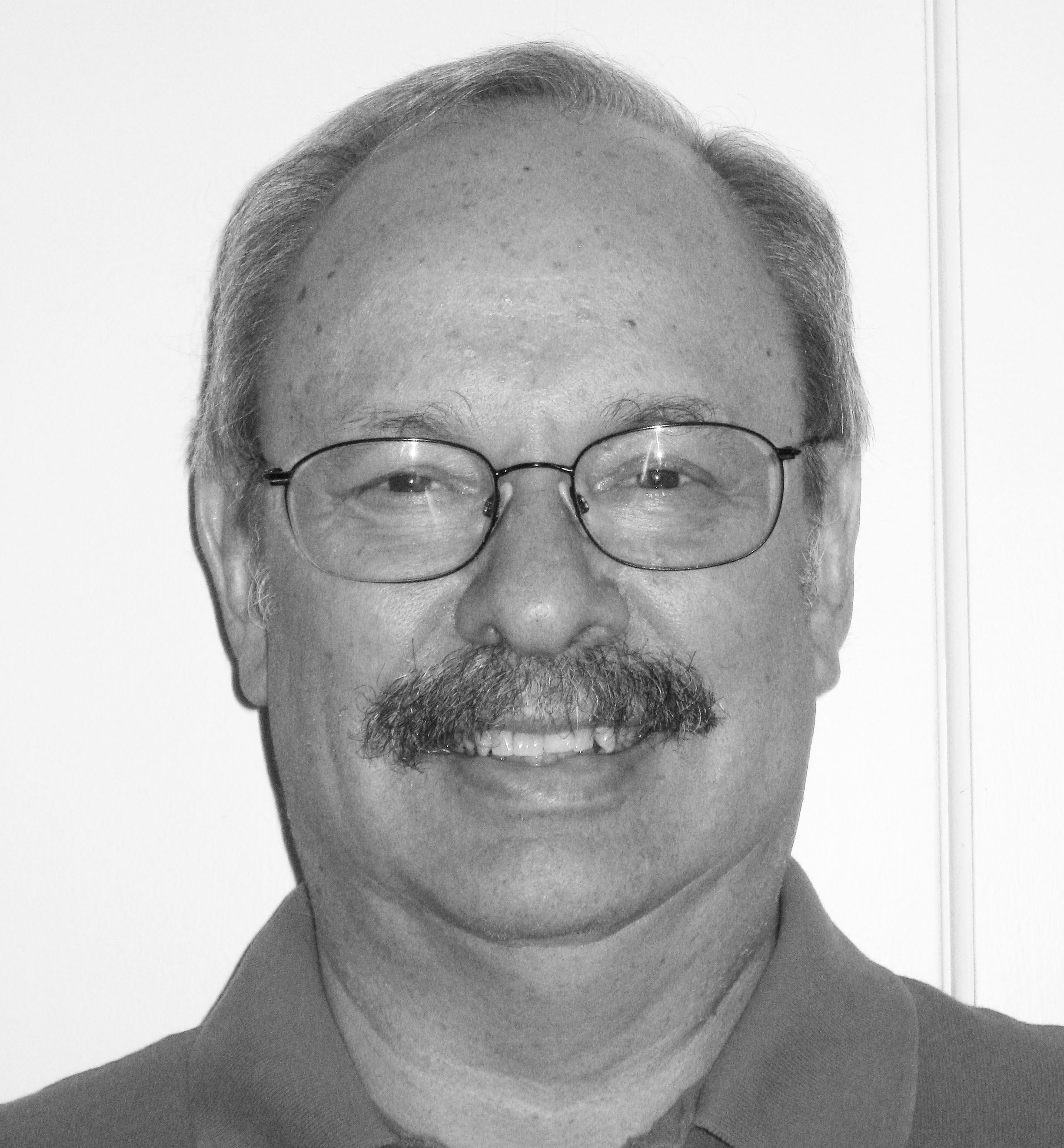
- Born: November 30, 1949 (age 76); Minneapolis, Minnesota
- Citizenship: United States of America
- Education: Columbia University BS in Biology (1971), Stony Brook University PhD (1976)
- Scientific career
- Fields: Biology
- Workplaces: Columbia University
- Website: http://biology.columbia.edu/people/manley

James Manley is the Julian Clarence Levi Professor of Life Sciences at Columbia University, where his laboratory studies gene expression in mammalian cells. Manley and colleagues identified and characterized the key factors responsible for polyadenylation of mRNA precursors, and elucidated how this remarkably complex machinery functions in gene regulation, for example during cell growth and differentiation. He has also studied the mechanism and regulation of the process by which introns are removed from mRNA precursors, mRNA splicing. Manley and his coworkers codiscovered the first alternative splicing factor (SR protein), characterized how this and other splicing regulatory proteins function and are themselves regulated, showed how alternative splicing can become deregulated in disease, and with respect to mechanism demonstrated that two spliceosomal small nuclear RNAs by themselves have catalytic activity. Finally, he elucidated unexpected links between these mRNA processing reactions and transcription, DNA damage signaling and maintenance of genomic stability. His work has thus provided considerable insight into the complex mechanisms that are essential for the regulated production of mRNAs in mammalian cells.

== Career ==
Manley received a B.S. from Columbia University, Ph.D. from Stony Brook/Cold Spring Harbor Labs, and did postdoctoral work at MIT. He has been in the Department of Biological Sciences at Columbia University since 1980, was Chair from 1995-2001 and Julian Clarence Levi Professor of Life Sciences since 1995. His research interests center on understanding the mechanisms and regulation of gene expression in mammalian cells. His work has been supported by many grants, including an NIH MERIT Award. He has authored or coauthored over 350 research articles and reviews on these topics, and is an ISI Highly Cited Researcher. Dr. Manley is or has been an Editor of three journals and has served on numerous editorial boards and review panels. He is a Fellow of the American Academy of Microbiology, the American Academy of Arts and Sciences and the American Association for the Advancement of Science, and a member of the National Academy of Sciences.
