= Arnold Berk =

American microbiologist and immunologist

Arnold J. Berk
- Awards: MERIT Award from the National Cancer Institute
- Scientific career
- Fields: Immunology, Microbiology
- Institutions: University of California, Los Angeles
- Academic advisors: Phillip Allen Sharp

Arnold J. Berk is an American professor of microbiology and immunology at the University of California, Los Angeles. He was a member of the Molecular Biology Institute, a division of University of California, Los Angeles. He was one of the discoverers of RNA splicing. His work focuses on gene regulation in DNA viruses. In 1998 he was elected to the American Academy of Arts and Sciences. In 2003, he received a MERIT Award from the National Cancer Institute. He authored editions 3 through 10 of the influential basic textbook Molecular Cell Biology published by Macmillan.
