= Edward Thomas Ryan =

American microbiologist

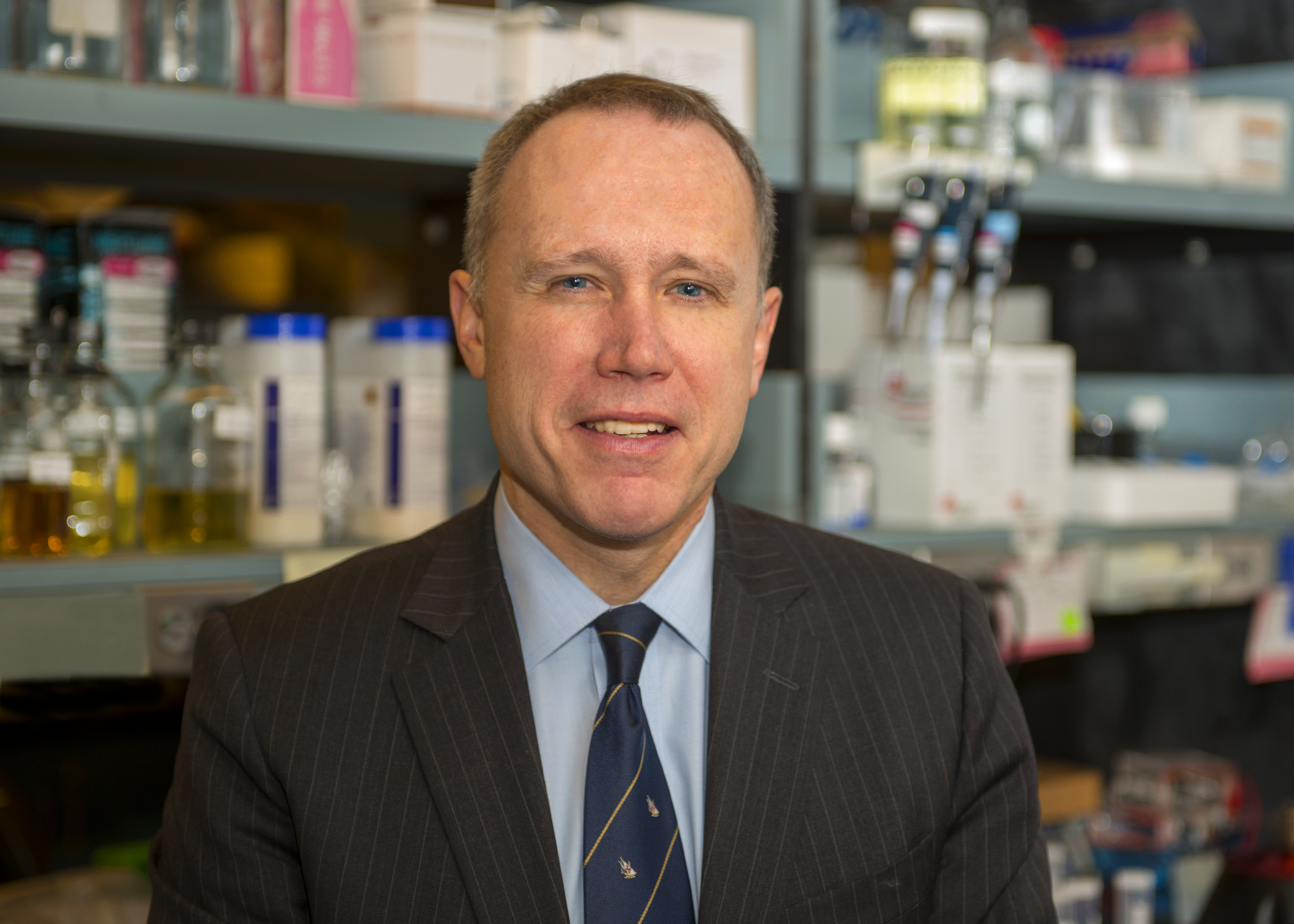
- Born: September 5, 1962 (age 63); New York City
- Education: Princeton University (A.B.); Harvard University (M.D.)
- Scientific career
- Workplaces: Massachusetts General Hospital Harvard University
- Website: Laboratory Webpage

Edward Thomas Ryan (born September 5, 1962) is an American microbiologist, immunologist, and physician at Harvard University and Massachusetts General Hospital. Ryan served as president of the American Society of Tropical Medicine and Hygiene from 2009 to 2010. Ryan is Professor of Immunology and Infectious Diseases at the Harvard T.H. Chan School of Public Health, Professor of Medicine at Harvard Medical School, and Director of Global Infectious Diseases at the Massachusetts General Hospital. Ryan's research and clinical focus has been on infectious diseases associated with residing in, immigrating from, or traveling through resource-limited areas. Ryan is a Fellow of the American Society of Microbiology, the American Society of Tropical Medicine and Hygiene, the American College of Physicians, and the Infectious Diseases Society of America.

Ryan's investigative work has focused on tropical, emerging and global infectious diseases, especially understanding host-pathogen interactions, and relating that knowledge to the discovery, development, and implementation of advanced diagnostics and vaccines. Particular areas of focus include cholera, typhoid, shigella, COVID-19 and the transmission of infectious diseases by humans crossing international borders.

== Career ==
=== Early career and training ===
Ryan was born in New York City and educated at the Horace Mann School. He received his bachelor's degree in biochemical sciences at Princeton University. He received a doctorate in medicine from Harvard University. He performed medical residency and fellowship training in infectious diseases at the Massachusetts General Hospital. Ryan received additional training at the London School of Hygiene and Tropical Medicine and the International Center for Diarrhoeal Disease Research (ICDDRB) in Dhaka, Bangladesh. Ryan was also an overseas fellow of the Center for the Study of the Society and Medicine, Columbia University College of Physicians and Surgeons. Following his training, Ryan joined the faculty of Harvard University and the staff of the Massachusetts General Hospital. He was appointed Professor at Harvard University in April, 2012. Ryan resides in Wellesley, Massachusetts.

=== Cholera ===
Together with Dr. Stephen Calderwood, Dr. Jason Harris, Dr. Regina LaRocque, Dr. Daniel Leung, Dr. Richelle Charles and colleagues at Harvard, and Dr. Firdausi Qadri and colleagues at the ICDDRB, Ryan has focused on advancing understanding of host-pathogen and immune responses during cholera, a human-restricted infection that largely afflicts impoverished individuals in resource-limited areas of the world. Ryan's investigative work is supported by the U.S. National Institutes of Health. Significant contributions include the finding that contrary to the previously established paradigm, cholera induces a pro-inflammatory response in afflicted humans, and that this response correlates with magnitude and duration of immunity against cholera. Ryan has particularly focused on analyzing immune responses against the polysaccharide coating of the Vibrio cholerae organism, the O-specific polysaccharide (OSP), working with Dr. Paul Kovac of the National Institutes of Health. Immune responses to OSP mediate protection against cholera in humans, and Ryan et al have shown that this protection is associated with the ability of antibodies targeting V. cholerae OSP to inhibit the normally highly mobile bacteria from swimming inside the intestinal lumen. This work has informed advanced vaccine development. Ryan has been awarded a MERIT Award from the NIH in support of these efforts.

=== Typhoid ===
Ryan's efforts in typhoid have largely focused on using high throughput analyses to characterize both pathogen responses during typhoid fever, including bacterial gene expression in infected humans, and human immune responses to bacterial infection. This collaborative work with Charles and Qadri has identified a biomarker of chronic carriage of the bacillus that causes typhoid fever (YncE; STY1479), and included the first transcriptional (gene expression) analysis of a bacterial pathogen directly in the bloodstream of an infected human; work that was performed in humans with typhoid and paratyphoid fever in Bangladesh. This work has informed diagnostic assay development.

=== Shigella ===
Ryan's efforts on shigellosis have focused on vaccine development and host-pathogen interactions. In 2006, Ryan showed that administration of antibiotics to children with shigellosis in Bangladesh did not increase toxin production by the bacterium. This finding supports targeted antimicrobial treatment of humans with shigellosis. Such treatment is usually contraindicated in humans infected with Shiga-toxin expressing E. coli infection (STEC/EHEC: enterohemorrhagic E. coli, Verotoxin-producing Escherichia coli), in whom such treatment substantially increasing the risk of renal failure.

=== Global TravEpiNet ===
Ryan co-directs the Global TravEpiNet (GTEN) consortium and program with Dr. Regina LaRocque. GTEN's focus has been to advance the health of U.S. residents who cross international borders. The GTEN network and its support tools were developed with support from the Centers for Disease Control and Prevention with the goal of lessening illness relating to crossing international borders and the likelihood of disease importation into home communities. This program has included the development of a number of public health programs and resources, including web tools that provide up-to-date recommendations on health interventions and risks; these resources are maintained within the Heading Home Healthy Program.

=== COVID-19 ===
When the COVID-19 pandemic began, Ryan pivoted his focus to working collaboratively on COVID-19. Efforts included development of an EUA (Expanded Access Authorized) laboratory-based PCR test, development of serologic assays for SARS-CoV-2 (the virus that causes COVID-19), analysis of persistence and decay of human antibody responses in COVID-19 patients, assessment of test performance characteristics of available serological and PCR assays against SARS-CoV-2, development of ultrasensitive antigen and antibody detection systems for SARS-CoV-2, assessment of immunologic cross-reactivity of SARS-CoV-2 with other coronaviridae, assessment of immune responses to SARS-CoV-2 in children, assessment of COVID-19 in Bangladesh, analysis of antibody functionality and signature during SARS-CoV-2 infection in relationship to mortality outcome, comparison of immune responses following vaccination to those induced by SARS-CoV-2 infection, assessment of plasma viral load with severity and mortality, and evaluation of the genomic epidemiology of SARS-CoV-2 in the Boston area. The detailed genomic epidemiology research identified that SARS-CoV-2 was imported repeatedly into the Boston area in early 2020 through international and domestic travel, and that a single superspreading event in Boston was genetically linked to over 300,000 subsequent cases in multiple states and in at least 9 countries in Europe, Asia and Oceania.

=== Clinical activities ===
Ryan is a staff Physician and Pediatrician at the Massachusetts General Hospital. He is Board certified in both Internal Medicine and Infectious Diseases, and has expertise in global infectious diseases and tropical medicine, including clinical parasitology, virology, bacteriology and mycology. Ryan is the Director of Global Infectious Diseases at Massachusetts General Hospital, and in 2006 isolated a new bacterial species (Bartonella rochalimae) in the blood of a woman with fever and splenomegaly who had recently been in Peru. The bacterium was characterized with colleagues at the University of California at San Francisco and the Centers for Disease Control and Prevention. Ryan served with the Massachusetts General Hospital field deployment team aboard the USNS Mercy hospital ship in Banda Aceh, Indonesia following the December 26, 2004 Indian Ocean earthquake and tsunami.

=== Teaching ===
Ryan teaches at Harvard College, Harvard Medical School and the Harvard School of Public Health. He trains post-doctoral fellows and students in his laboratory, as well as intern, resident, fellow and student clinicians-in-training at the Massachusetts General Hospital. He directs a Fogarty International Center Training program between the Massachusetts General Hospital and the ICDDRB in Bangladesh.

=== Service ===
Ryan has served on advisory and review committees for the National Institutes of Health, the US Centers for Disease Control and Prevention, and the Institute of Medicine.

=== Publications ===
Ryan has authored or co-authored over 300 publications, including over 200 in the peer-reviewed literature. He also has served in editorial capacities for PLoS Neglected Tropical Diseases, the CDC Yellow Book (Health Information for International Travel), Microbes and Infections, and is Senior Editor of Hunter's Tropical Infectious Diseases.
