= Karen Pierce (scientist) =

American scientist

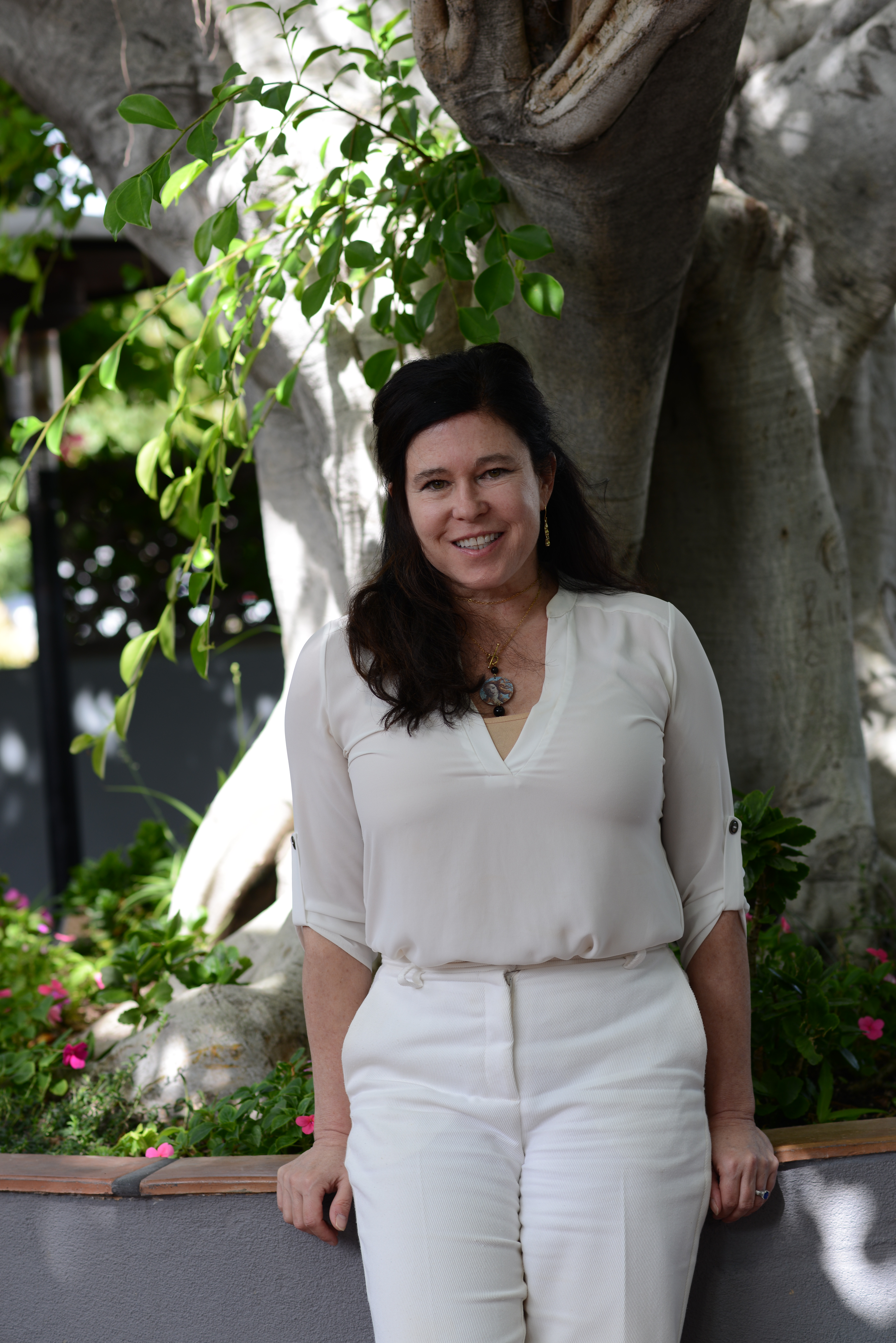
- Pierce in 2023
- Born: Manhattan, NY
- Education: Stony Brook University (B.A.); UC San Diego (Ph.D.)
- Known for: Early Detection of Autism and Developmental Neuroscience Research
- Spouse: Eric Courchesne
- Awards: NIMH Merit Award
- Website: https://autism-center.ucsd.edu

Karen Pierce is an American scientist known for her research on the early detection of autism spectrum disorder (ASD). She is a professor-in-residence in the Department of Neurosciences at University of California San Diego, and co-director of the UC San Diego Autism Center of Excellence.

== Education and career ==
Pierce holds a bachelor’s degree in psychology from Stony Brook University, and a PhD in experimental psychology from the University of California, San Diego, under her adviser Laura Schreibman.

Through a K01 award, she trained in neuroscience and used brain imaging and eye tracking for early autism biomarkers. In 2011, Pierce assembled a network of 137 pediatricians throughout San Diego to screen for autism at well-baby check-ups starting at age 12 months, three years earlier than the average age of diagnosis. This eventually formed the foundation for her Get SET Early model, which provides a mechanism for the early detection and treatment referral of toddlers with ASD and to examine eye tracking and brain imaging as tools for early biomarker discovery very early in development.

In addition to grant support from the National Institute of Mental Health (NIMH) and the National Institute on Deafness and Other Communication Disorders (NIDCD), Pierce is also a recipient of grants from the Centers for Disease Control and Prevention (CDC) and the Simons Foundation.

== Autism early detection research ==
=== Eye Tracking as a diagnostic tool for autism ===
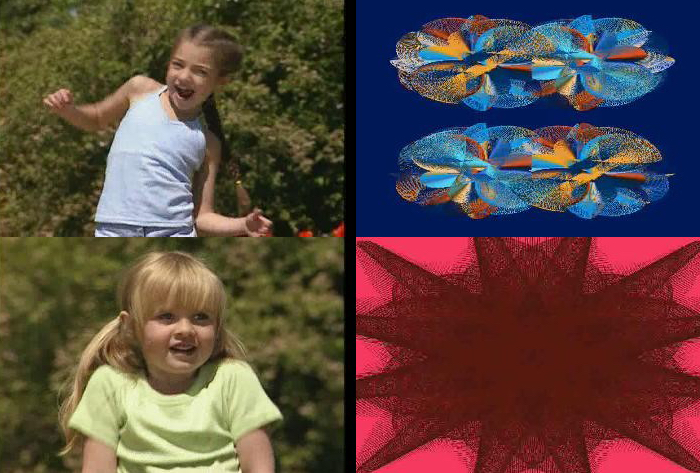
Sample Images from the GeoPref Test Which do you prefer?

Pierce researches eye-tracking as a diagnostic and prognostic tool for ASD. In 2011, her team found that some toddlers with ASD spent considerably more time fixating on dynamic geometric images, rather than social images, when compared to non-ASD toddlers. The initial study indicated that if a toddler fixated on geometric images for over 69% of the time, the likelihood of an accurate autism diagnosis was 100%. The ‘Geometric Preference Test’ (GeoPref Test) were the first published eye tracking-based biomarker of a specific autism subtype. Pierce has since created additional eye tracking tests, including those measuring attention to speech.

=== Get SET Early ===
Pierce developed the Get SET Early Model to standardize early autism screening, evaluation, and treatment in medical settings. The program connects three key steps: Screening (S), Evaluation (E), and Treatment (T), aiming to detect ASD by age two. Early diagnosis allows children to start treatment early, benefiting from neural plasticity. Over 200 pediatricians collaborate to screen for ASD and other developmental conditions at 12, 18, and 24-month checkups. Screening begins at 12 months, as this is the earliest age supported by evidence-based treatment.

=== Brain imaging ===
Early in her career, Pierce used functional magnetic resonance imaging (fMRI) to study brain activity related to social challenges faced by most individuals with ASD. Research showed reduced activity in face-processing areas when individuals with ASD viewed faces. However, Pierce found that when children with ASD saw familiar faces, like their mother or sibling, their brain activity was similar to neurotypical individuals. She now uses fMRI to study brain function in social speech processing in children aged 12–36 months.

== Other research ==
During her early career Pierce investigated the efficacy of naturalistic behavioral treatments for children with ASD, particularly Pivotal Response Treatment (PRT). Based on this work, she created both a teacher and peer training manual to support the use of PRT in a classroom setting by neurotypical students with classmates who have ASD. Pierce is also an investigator for the CDC's ADDM Network and leads public health projects to determine the prevalence rates of autism in San Diego county.

== Honors and awards ==
In 2023, Pierce received a National Institutes of Health MERIT Award.
