= Charles R. Wira =

- Education: Delaware Valley College; Michigan State University; Dartmouth College
- Scientific career
- Workplaces: Dartmouth College

Charles R. Wira is an American scientist specializing in endocrinology and mucosal immunology. His research focuses on the immune system at mucosal surfaces of the female reproductive tract.

== Biography ==
Wira earned a bachelor's of science in Animal Husbandry from Delaware Valley College (now Delaware Valley University) in 1962 and a master's of science in Physiology from Michigan State University in 1966. He completed his Ph.D at Dartmouth College in 1970, where he began his academic career as an assistant professor in the Department of Physiology. He was promoted to professor in 1985. Between 1970 and 1972, Wira pursued postdoctoral training at the University of Paris, France, where he studied the molecular mechanisms of estrogen action in the uterus.

Wira's research investigates the effects of female sex hormones on innate and adaptive immunity in the female reproductive tract, using both animal models and human studies. He has participated in a Dartmouth Medical School Fogarty Grant that facilitated training in HIV-related mucosal immunology for scientists from the University of Muhimbili, Tanzania.

Wira has been involved with the Society for Mucosal Immunology, the American Society for Reproductive Immunology (ASRI), the American Society for Microbiology, and the International Society for Immunology of Reproduction (ISIR). He was president of ASRI from 2008 to 2010 and president of ISIR from 2015 to 2017.

== Achievements and contributions ==
Wira has received an NIH MERIT Award and the ASRI Distinguished Investigator Award in Reproductive Immunology. He has advised the National Institutes of Health (NIH) on projects, including the NIH Women, Girls, and HIV/AIDS Group, the NIH Planning Group for HIV-related research, and the OAR Microbicides Planning Group. He has also helped organize NIH-sponsored international meetings on HIV prevention and mucosal immunity.
