= Mark Blumberg =

American psychologist

Mark S. Blumberg
- Occupations: Neuroscientist; Professor; Researcher; Author

Academic background
- Education: Biopsychology
- Alma mater: University of Chicago (PhD)

Academic work
- Discipline: Psychology; Neuroscience
- Sub-discipline: Developmental psychobiology; Sleep; Behavioral neuroscience
- Institutions: University of Iowa
- Notable works: Freaks of Nature

Mark S. Blumberg is an American professor, neuroscientist, researcher, and author who specializes in the fields of developmental psychobiology and behavioral neuroscience. He is currently University of Iowa Distinguished Chair and department chair in the Department of Psychological and Brain Sciences at the University of Iowa. In addition to writing academic research articles, Blumberg has served as the editor-in-chief of Behavioral Neuroscience and authored several books, including Freaks of Nature: What Anomalies Tell Us About Development and Evolution. His research also appeared on a 2020 episode of the Netflix series, Babies.

== Education ==
During his undergraduate years, Blumberg studied physics and philosophy at Brandeis University, where he graduated in 1983. While at Brandeis, he studied under Frank E. Manuel and Art Wingfield. He earned his master's degree and his PhD at the University of Chicago, working with Howard Moltz and Martha McClintock and finishing his doctoral studies in biopsychology in 1988. He had a focus on developmental psychobiology at Indiana University for his postdoctoral training, working with Jeffrey Alberts, which concluded in 1992.

== Career ==
After completing his postdoctoral training at Indiana University, Blumberg joined the faculty in the Department of Psychology at the University of Iowa. His research there has focused on behavioral, psychological, and neural development. In 1997, Blumberg was honored with an APA Distinguished Scientific Early Career Award for his research on behavioral and physiological development. In 2002, his first book, Body Heat: Temperature and Life on Earth, was published by Harvard University Press. The book discusses thermoregulation in humans and other animals and how it affects behavior and development. Three years later in 2005, he published his second book, Basic Instinct: The Genesis of Behavior, through Thunder's Mouth Press. The book delves into the origins of so-called innate behaviors, reframing them as emerging from complex biological and environmental cascades rather than as products of hardwiring or genetic instruction. This theme is a central tenet of Developmental Systems Theory, of which Blumberg is a proponent.

In 2008, Blumberg was named the editor-in-chief of Behavioral Neuroscience, a peer-reviewed scientific journal covering its eponymous topic and published by the American Psychological Association. The following year, he published his third book, Freaks of Nature: What Anomalies Tell Us About Development and Evolution, through Oxford University Press. The book discusses elements of behavioral plasticity and the developing animal's ability to adapt to the body it has, rather than the body it was "supposed" to have. This theme again contrasts with the idea that certain behaviors are "preprogrammed." In the book, Blumberg uses examples from conjoined twins who coordinate their behavior and goats and dogs born without forelimbs who learn to walk on their hind legs. Also in 2009, Blumberg was a co-editor of the Oxford Handbook of Developmental Behavioral Neuroscience. During this time, he also served as the president of the International Society for Developmental Psychobiology and was named the F. Wendell Miller Professor of Psychology at the University of Iowa.

In 2014, he received a National Institutes of Health MERIT Award for his research on sleep and its role in neural development. Blumberg had been researching muscle twitches during sleep and their role in the development of connections between muscles, brain, and spinal cord since the 1990s. The studies show that muscle twitches during sleep provide information to the brains of newborn animals about the structure of muscles and limbs, effectively teaching the brain how to move the body. Blumberg's research on the subject was highlighted in an episode of the 2020 Netflix series, Babies. In 2017, Blumberg was named the department chair of the University of Iowa's Department of Psychological and Brain Sciences, a position he continues to hold as of 2020.

== Selected publications ==
Year	Title	Original publisher	ISBN	Notes
2002	Body Heat: Temperature and Life on Earth	Harvard University Press	ISBN 978-0674007628	
2005	Basic Instinct: The Genesis of Behavior	Thunder's Mouth Press	ISBN 978-1560256595	
2009	Freaks of Nature: What Anomalies Tell Us About Development and Evolution	Oxford University Press	ISBN 978-0195322828	
2009	Oxford Handbook of Developmental Behavioral Neuroscience	Oxford University Press	ISBN 978-0195314731	Co-editor with John Freeman and Scott Robinson
2016	How We Develop—Developmental Systems and the Emergence of Complex Behaviors	WIREs Cognitive Science		Co-editor with John Spencer and David Shenk
