= Michael D. Rugg =

American neuroscientist

Michael Derek Rugg FRSE (born September 23, 1954) is a Distinguished Chair in Behavioral and Brain Sciences at University of Texas at Dallas. He is director of The Center for Vital Longevity in Dallas, Texas. His current research program involves the use of electrophysiological (EEG and ERP) and functional magnetic resonance imaging (fMRI) methods to investigate the cognitive and neural bases of memory encoding and memory retrieval, as well as how and why memory function differs as a result of healthy aging or neurological disease.

Rugg received a B.Sc. in 1976 and a Ph.D. in 1979 from the University of Leicester. Rugg has been employed at University of St. Andrews (1979–1998). There, he served as a professor of psychology (1992–1998) and a Wellcome Trust Research Fellow (1994–1998). From 1998 to 2003, he served as a professor of Cognitive Neuroscience and Wellcome Principal Research Fellow at the Institute of Cognitive Neuroscience and Department of Psychology at University College London. From 2004 to 2010, he was a Professor in the Department of Neurobiology and Behavior at University of California, Irvine and Director of the Center for the Neurobiology of Learning and Memory
