= Howard Moltz =

American developmental biopsychologist

- Born: 1927; New York City, New York
- Died: November 26, 2004 (aged 76–77)
- Education: New York University
- Spouse: Marilyn Moltz (m. 1948–2004)
- Children: Erica Moltz; Lauren Moltz; Marci Malter
- Scientific career
- Fields: Biopsychology; Developmental psychology
- Workplaces: Brooklyn College; University of Chicago
- Academic advisors: T. C. Schneirla
- Notable students: Mark S. Blumberg; Julie Mennella

Howard Moltz (1927-2004) was an American developmental biopsychologist who was a professor of psychology at the University of Chicago. Much of his earlier research focused on imprinting and maternal behavior in rats, but later in his career, he shifted to using positron emission tomography to research sexual behavior in humans. He was a fellow of the American Association for the Advancement of Science and served as president of the International Society for Developmental Psychobiology. Shortly after his death in 2004, the Illinois General Assembly passed a resolution in his honor.
