= Jim Foote =

American football player (born 1968)

Profile
- Positions: Quarterback, punter

Personal information
- Born: September 10, 1951 (age 75); Carlisle, Pennsylvania, U.S.
- Listed height: 6 ft 1 in (1.85 m)
- Listed weight: 209 lb (95 kg)

Career information
- High school: Boiling Springs (Boiling Springs, Pennsylvania)
- College: Delaware Valley (1969–1972)
- NFL draft: 1973: 17th round, 432nd overall pick

Career history
- New York Jets (1973)*; Houston Oilers (1974); Tampa Bay Buccaneers (1976)*; Houston Oilers (1976)
- * Offseason or practice squad member only

James Michael Foote (born September 10, 1951) is an American former professional football player who was a quarterback in the National Football League (NFL). He played college football for the Delaware Valley Aggies and was selected by the New York Jets in the 17th round of the 1973 NFL draft as a punter. Foote was on the active roster of the Houston Oilers in both 1974 and 1976 as a backup quarterback.

== Early life ==
James Michael Foote Jr. was born on September 10, 1951, in Carlisle, Pennsylvania. He played high school football at Boiling Springs High School in Boiling Springs, Pennsylvania, and graduated in 1969.

== College career ==
Foote enrolled at the Delaware Valley College of Science and Agriculture to play college football for the Aggies. He played quarterback and punter for the Aggies from 1969 to 1972. In May 1973, The Times said Foote was the top quarterback in the Middle Atlantic Conference College Division during the 1972 season.

== Professional career ==
Foote was selected by the New York Jets in the 17th round, with the 432nd overall pick, of the 1973 NFL draft as a punter. He signed with the Jets on May 5, 1973. He also practiced at quarterback during training camp. Foote was released after he had trouble learning the playbook.

By early August 1973, Foote was now a backup quarterback for the minor league New York Crusaders. By late August, he had become the starting quarterback for the Cumberland Colts of the Interstate Football League. He threw five interceptions in his first game with the Colts but improved as the season went on, earning league all-star honors as a quarterback and punter while leading the Colts to a 9–1 record.

In February 1974, Foote signed with the Houston Oilers as a quarterback/punter. During the 1974 NFL players strike, Foote started at quarterback for the Oilers during the preseason due to Dan Pastorini and Lynn Dickey taking part in the strike. Through the first two preseason games, Foote had completed 56% of his passes for three touchdowns while also rushing for a touchdown as the Oilers won both games. They lost the following week against the Dallas Cowboys in overtime. The next week against the Atlanta Falcons on August 26, 1974, Dickey entered the game and the fans chanted "We Want Foote, We Want Foote." Foote was on the Oilers' active roster in 1974 as a backup quarterback but did not play in any games. He was released by the Oilers on September 16, 1975, before the start of the 1975 regular season.

Foote was signed by the expansion Tampa Bay Buccaneers on March 4, 1976. He had a poor showing during training camp. He was waived on August 17, 1976, before ever playing in any preseason games for the Buccaneers. Foote started working at a brewery in Houston after being released by Tampa Bay.

On November 9, 1976, Foote signed with the Oilers to serve as the third-string quarterback behind new starter John Hadl and the injured Dan Pastorini, who still suited up for the game with padding over his broken rib. Foote was released before the 1977 season.

== Personal life ==
Foote later coached high school football in Texas. He has been an ordained minister since 1984.
