= National Institutes of Health MERIT Award =

American award

The NIH MERIT award (Method To Extend Research in Time) Award (R37) was created by the National Institutes of Health in 1986. It is designed to provide stable, long-term funding support to outstanding, experienced investigators whose productivity is superior and who are deemed highly likely to continue to perform their research activities in an outstanding manner. The MERIT award provided funding for 5 years and could be renewed for up to 10 years. Unlike most NIH grant awards, the MERIT award cannot be applied for by the investigator. Researchers submitting an R01 that receives a fundable score are considered for the award. In 2018, the NIH began awarding MERIT awards to "Early Stage Investigators", who are in the first 10 years of their career.

== Notable MERIT award recipients ==
Name	Institute	Year
Deborah Persaud	Johns Hopkins University School of Medicine	2026
Shu Jiang	Washington University in St. Louis	2021
Xiang-Jin Meng	Virginia Polytechnic Institute and State University	2024
Joyce Huanhuan Chen	The University of Chicago	2024
Jamil S. Saad, PhD	University of Alabama at Birmingham	2023
Karen Pierce, PhD	University of California San Diego	2023
Karen Adolph	New York University	2006
Jeffery Alberts	Indiana University	1998
Susan Amara	National Institutes of Health	2004
Arnold Berk	UCLA	2003
Mark Blumberg	University of Iowa	2014
Gary Borisy	Northwestern University	1989
Joan Brugge	Harvard Medical School	1987
Joseph D. Brain	Harvard T.H. Chan School of Public Health	1987
Donald S. Coffey	Johns Hopkins University School of Medicine	1988
Chris Q. Doe	University of Oregon	2013
John Engelhardt	University of Iowa	2005
Cindy L. Ehlers	Scripps Research Institute	2007
David L. Felten	Oakland University	1989
Andrew Feinberg	Johns Hopkins University	2001
Catherine Clarke Fenselau	Johns Hopkins University	1991
Jorge E. Galán	Yale University	2000, 2015
Ethel Gilbert	National Cancer Institute	2003
Patricia A. Grady	NIH	
Shiv I.S. Grewal	National Cancer Institute	
Alan Grodzinsky	MIT	1994
Curtis C. Harris	National Cancer Institute	2009
Eric Jacobsen	Harvard University	2002
Muhammad Ashraf	University of Cincinnati	2003
Lily Jan	UCSF	2006
Jeremy J. Johnson	University of Illinois Chicago	2019
Barbara B. Kahn	Harvard University	2006
Kenneth W. Kinzler	Johns Hopkins University	2002
Leonid Kruglyak	Princeton University	2002
Hsiang-fu Kung	National Cancer Institute	1998
M. Daniel Lane	Johns Hopkins School of Medicine	1990
Mitchell Lazar	University of Pennsylvania	
Xihong Lin	Harvard University	2007
Andrew D. Luster	Massachusetts General Hospital	
James L. Manley	Columbia University	
Sean J. Morrison	UT Southwestern	2009
Eric N. Olson	UT Southwestern	2000
Michele Pagano	NYU School of Medicine	2006
Pier Paolo Pandolfi	Harvard Medical School	2005
Peipei Ping	University of California, Los Angeles	2010
Carol Prives	Columbia University	1996
Alexander Raikhel	University of California Riverside	
Julius Rebek	Scripps Research Institute	1996
Clarice Reid	NHLBI	
Edward T. Ryan	Massachusetts General Hospital-Harvard University	
Sandra Schmid	UT Southwestern	2000
John M. Sedivy	Brown University	2009
Edward I. Solomon	Stanford University	1995, 2002
Kevin Struhl	Harvard Medical School	1993
Suresh Subramani	UC San Diego	
Kenneth Thibodeau	National Archives and Records Administration	2000
Inder Verma	Salk Institute for Biological Studies	1987
Sean Whelan	Harvard Medical School	2005
William T. Wickner	Dartmouth Medical School	
Charles R. Wira	Dartmouth College	
George Woude	Van Andel Research Institute	1982
Hao Wu	Harvard Medical School	
Margaret C. Wu	National Heart, Lung, and Blood Institute	1989
Nancy Zahniser	University of Colorado	
Patricia Spear	Northwestern University	1987, 1999
Dagmar Sternad	Northeastern University	2022
David A. Sinclair	Harvard Medical School	2012
BVV Prasad	Baylor college of medicine	2003
BVV Prasad	Baylor college of medicine	2013
