= Osteoarthritis and Cartilage =

Peer-reviewed scientific journal

- Discipline: Orthopedics, rheumatology
- Language: English
- Edited by: J. Block

Publication details
- History: 1993-present
- Publisher: Elsevier on behalf of the Osteoarthritis Research Society International
- Frequency: Monthly
- Impact factor: 7.000 (2022)

Standard abbreviations
- ISO 4: Osteoarthr. Cartil.

Indexing
- ISSN: 1063-4584 (print); 1522-9653 (web)
- LCCN: 92002993
- OCLC no.: 26040908

Links
- Journal homepage; Online access

Osteoarthritis and Cartilage is monthly peer-reviewed medical journal covering research in orthopedics and rheumatology. It is an official journal of the Osteoarthritis Research Society International, published on their behalf by Elsevier.
