= Nancy Zahniser =

American pharmacologist

Nancy R. Zahniser
- Born: Nancy Rutledge; October 26, 1948; Ann Arbor, Michigan, United States
- Died: May 5, 2016 (aged 67); Denver, Colorado, United States
- Known for: Research on dopamine

Academic background
- Education: PhD
- Alma mater: University of Pittsburgh
- Thesis: Is 2-Dimethylaminoethanol (Deanol) a Precursor of Acetylcholine? A Neurochemical and Behavioral Investigation (1977)
- Doctoral advisor: Israel Hanin

Academic work
- Discipline: Pharmacology
- Institutions: University of Colorado Denver
- Doctoral students: Robert P. Yasuda, Donald M. Burnett, Margaret J. Velardo, Jilla Sabeti, Bruce H. Mandt, Anna M. Nelson, Dorothy J. Yamamoto
- Main interests: Dopamine, addiction

Nancy Rutledge Zahniser (October 26, 1948 – May 5, 2016) was an American pharmacologist, best known for her work involving the mechanism of dopaminergic pathways and chemical modifications of them. Although born in Ann Arbor, Michigan, Zahniser grew up in Chillicothe, Ohio and subsequently enrolled at the College of Wooster, where she obtained a degree in chemistry. After completing her degree, Zahniser spent some time in India where she met her first husband Mark Zahniser; she later returned to the United States to attend the University of Pittsburgh School of Pharmacy, where she earned her PhD in pharmacology in 1977. Zahniser went on to complete her post-doctoral training at the University of Colorado Health Sciences Center's Department of Pharmacology and then became a part of the faculty there. In 2007, she became associate dean for research education. She played a role in advancing the careers of many post-doctoral students in her lab. In addition to her work as a professor, Zahniser was also a member of several boards, committees, review panels, and professional societies related to pharmacology, neuroscience, and addiction. She led several national research meetings from 1995 to 2002.

== Education ==
Zahniser obtained a bachelor's degree in chemistry at the College of Wooster in 1970. She obtained her PhD in pharmacology in 1977 at the University of Pittsburgh, with Israel Hanin as her adviser. Her doctoral dissertation was on the mechanisms of brain acetylcholine production in mice and rats. The University of Pittsburgh School of Pharmacy would later present her with their Distinguished Alumna Award in 2009.

== Career ==
After earning her doctoral degree, Zahniser was trained as a postdoctoral fellow by Perry Molinoff at the University of Colorado Health Sciences Center. Upon completion of post-doctoral training in 1980, Zahniser became an instructor at the University of Colorado School of Medicine's Department of Pharmacology and soon joined the faculty, obtaining tenure in 1991. She taught in three programs: pharmacology, neuroscience, and medical student training. As a professor, she supervised graduate and postdoctoral students, several of whom went on to establish laboratories of their own. She was appointed the department's vice-chair and acting chair as well as associate dean for research education. Zahniser's role in these positions proved crucial for those who sought funding by the university for related scientific projects, including various awards and fellowships. Although her primary affiliation was with the University of Colorado, she also served as a guest lecturer at various universities throughout the United States, including the University of Pittsburgh, Loyola University, and the University of Texas Health Science Center at San Antonio.

From 1981 on she regularly received funding from the National Institutes of Health (NIH) that supported her work through grants from the National Institute on Drug Abuse (NIDA), including an NIH MERIT Award, a Senior Scientist Award, and a Research Scientist Development Award. She served on NIH and NIDA committees related to the science of drug abuse.

The Pharmaceutical Research and Manufacturers of America foundation presented her with the Award in Excellence in Pharmacology/Toxicology both in 1984 and 2014 for her work involving addiction to drugs of abuse and its relation to dopamine regulation.

== Research ==
Zahniser's research concerned the role of dopamine in the brain, especially in relation to addictive disorders. Her thesis research investigated the principal effects of increases of deanol-p-acetamidobenzoate (colloquially known as deaner or deanol) on the synthesis of brain acetylcholine in mice and rats as well as possible elevations of deanol and choline. Although the direct mechanism was not discovered, this finding led to belief that deanol plays a key role in acetylcholine synthesis.

Other key research Zahniser was involved in included her postdoctoral research in the lab of Perry Molinoff, and together they examined how the nucleotide guanine could influence the binding of dopamine receptor agonists H-apomorphine and H-domperidone in certain brain regions. Their work revealed that the addition of guanine, such as in the molecule guanosine triphosphate, to dopamine binding sites could increase the binding affinity of the D4 dopamine receptor while decreasing the binding affinity of the D2 dopamine receptor. The finding revealed a mechanism of dopaminergic regulation that was previously unknown.

Zahniser examined the pharmacological effects of cocaine usage on the brain in rodents, and used her findings to create a model for human cocaine abuse. Her experiments using autoradiography revealed cocaine's effect on D1 and D2 dopamine receptors in the rat striatum. Rats treated with cocaine eight times in one 24-hour period showed increased responsiveness and a temporary artificial elevation of D2 receptors in the nucleus accumbens over a 7-day period. The findings showed a correlation between cocaine administration and behavioral sensitization, thus providing a premise for addiction in human cocaine users.

Zahniser published more than 150 articles and book chapters, which have been cited over 6200 times, giving her an h-index of 44.

== Meetings ==
Zahniser was an organizer for the Gordon Research Conferences on catecholamines in 1995 and 1997. On April 9, 2013, the University of Florida's Center for Addiction Research and Education held the "Zahniser Addiction Symposium" in her honor, where she discussed her extensive work involving dopamine transmitters and cocaine, followed by other scientists who presented their own original research regarding substance abuse and dependence.

== Personal life and death ==
Zahniser was born October 26, 1948, in Ann Arbor, Michigan and grew up in Chillicothe, Ohio, graduating high school in 1966. After finishing her bachelor's, she taught high-school science for a year at the Woodstock School in Mussoorie, India. While teaching there, she met Peace Corps volunteer Mark Zahniser, and the two were married in New Delhi in 1971. They divorced. In 1979 she and Tom Dunwiddie became companions and enjoyed a scientific and personal relationship until Tom’s tragic death in Yosemite in 2001. In 2006 she remarried with Chris Wing.

Zahniser died in May 2016 from neuroglioblastoma.
