= Ontario Scholar =

Canadian high school graduation award

An example of a medallion given to Ontario Scholars by the District School Board of Niagara, an additional recognition beyond the certificate issued by the province.

Ontario Scholars are high school graduates in the Canadian province of Ontario who attain an average of 80% or greater in their six best Grade 12 courses.

The award is granted by the Ontario Ministry of Education, and consists of a certificate from the Minister of Education that is usually presented to students at their graduation ceremony. The award and its certificate are standardized by the Ministry of Education; however, some schools choose internally to have special recognition of Ontario Scholars above and beyond this. The award is distinct from other academic acknowledgements such as an Honour Roll.

== History ==
Prior to the elimination of Grade 13 in 2003, qualification was based on Grade 13 courses. From 1984 to 2003, the qualification process used Ontario Academic Credit (OAC) courses. In the 1960s, Ontario Scholars received an award of $400. During the 1970s and 1980s, a $100 monetary award from the Province of Ontario was presented to Ontario Scholars along with their certificate. As of 2009, students are only entitled to a certificate.

== Relation to grade inflation ==
The number of Ontario Scholars has steadily increased since the 1960s. During those years, only around 5% of Ontario students were Ontario Scholars, with an average of 80% over seven of their grade 13 courses. By the 1990s, that number had risen to 40%, and currently sits at over 60% of graduates being Ontario Scholars with an 80% average or greater over their best six grade 12 courses. The higher percentage of students becoming an Ontario Scholar has been correlated with higher entrance requirements at universities.

== See also ==
- Ontario Graduate Scholarship
