= Osteoarthritis Research Society International =

Nonprofit medical organization

The Osteoarthritis Research Society International (OARSI) is a non-profit scientific organization. The mission of OARSI is to promote and advance research for the prevention and treatment of osteoarthritis.

OARSI publishes an international fully peer-reviewed multidisciplinary journal, Osteoarthritis and Cartilage. Many specialists, practitioners and researchers use this journal as a forum for idea dissemination related to diseases of cartilage and joints.

== World Congress on Osteoarthritis ==
Each year OARSI hosts a world congress on osteoarthritis.

Year	Congress	Location
2019	24th World Congress on Osteoarthritis	Toronto, Canada
2018	23rd World Congress on Osteoarthritis	Liverpool, United Kingdom
2017	22nd World Congress on Osteoarthritis	Las Vegas, United States
2016	21st World Congress on Osteoarthritis	Amsterdam, Netherlands
2015	20th World Congress on Osteoarthritis	Seattle, United States
2014	19th World Congress on Osteoarthritis	Paris, France
2013	18th World Congress on Osteoarthritis	Philadelphia, United States
2012	17th World Congress on Osteoarthritis	Barcelona, Spain
2011	16th World Congress on Osteoarthritis	San Diego, United States
2010	15th World Congress on Osteoarthritis	Brussels, Belgium
2009	14th World Congress on Osteoarthritis	Montreal, Canada
2008	13th World Congress on Osteoarthritis	Rome, Italy
2007	12th World Congress on Osteoarthritis	Fort Lauderdale, United States
2006	11th World Congress on Osteoarthritis	Prague, Czech Republic
2005	10th World Congress on Osteoarthritis	Boston, United States
2004	9th World Congress on Osteoarthritis	Chicago, United States
2003	8th World Congress on Osteoarthritis	Berlin, Germany
2002	7th World Congress on Osteoarthritis	Sydney, Australia
2001	6th World Congress on Osteoarthritis	Washington, DC, United States
2000	5th World Congress on Osteoarthritis	Barcelona, Spain
1999	4th World Congress on Osteoarthritis	Vienna, Austria
1997	3rd International Osteoarthritis Research Society Congress	Singapore, Singapore
1994	2nd International Osteoarthritis Research Society Congress	Orlando, United States
1992	1st International Congress of the Osteoarthritis Research Society	Paris, France
