= Dagmar Sternad =

German-American scientist and engineer

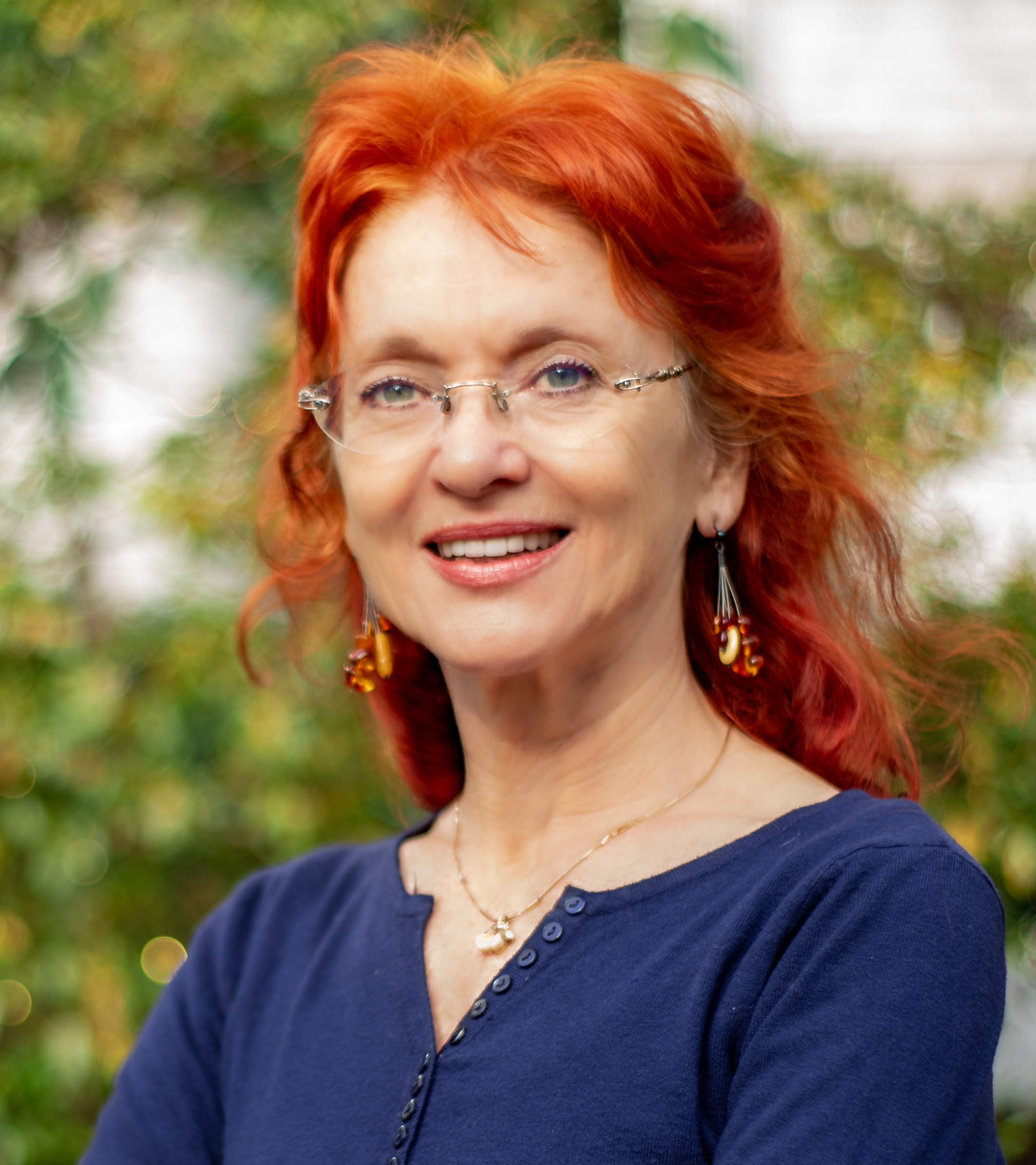
- Sternad in 2022

Academic background
- Education: BS, MS, Movement Science and Linguistics, 1986, Technical University of Munich, LMU Munich; MS, PhD, Experimental Psychology, 1995, University of Connecticut
- Thesis: Dynamics of 1:2 coordination in rhythmic interlimb movement (1995)
- Doctoral advisor: Michael Turvey

Academic work
- Discipline: Computational neuroscience, experimental psychology, motor control and learning
- Institutions: Northeastern University; Pennsylvania State University
- Website: https://actionlab.sites.northeastern.edu

Dagmar Sternad is a German-American scientist and engineer. Sternad is University Distinguished Professor of Biology, Electrical and Computer Engineering, and Physics at Northeastern University. She is also a core member of the Institute of Experiential Robotics at Northeastern University.

== Education ==
Sternad completed her undergraduate and master's degree in movement science and English language and linguistics from the Technical University of Munich and LMU Munich and received her PhD in experimental psychology from the University of Connecticut. She was supported by the Studienstiftung (German Academic Scholarship Foundation). During her studies, she also published five books on exercise and fitness.

== Career ==
Following her PhD, Sternad joined the faculty of Kinesiology and Integrative Biosciences at the Pennsylvania State University from 1995 to 2008. She was subsequently appointed to the faculty of both Biology and Electrical and Computer Engineering at Northeastern University. As director of the Action Lab, she has been conducting computational and experimental research on the control and coordination of human movement. Sternad's interdisciplinary research has been continuously funded by the National Institutes of Health and the National Science Foundation.

Sternad's fundamental research on human motor control and learning has also impacted studies on individuals with neurological impairments, such as stroke, autism, and dystonia. She was recognized with the Best Paper award for her paper "From theoretical analysis to clinical assessment and intervention". Through several collaborative grants, Sternad aims to translate insights in human motor control to the control of robots. She also examined motor development and its link to respiratory physiology in preterm infants.

As a result of her accomplishments in research and teaching, Sternad was named the 2014 Robert D. Klein University Lecturer. She was also two-times elected a member of the executive board of the Society for Neural Control of Movement. In 2019, Sternad was promoted to University Distinguished Professor, the highest rank the university can bestow upon a faculty member. In December 2021, Sternad was ranked amongst the top 2% of scientists worldwide by Stanford University. In 2022, she received a NIH MERIT Award bestowed to outstanding investigators for her research on basic and translational science. She also received a Fulbright US Scholar award to pursue research in Rome and Messina, Italy.
