= Nature's 10 =

Annual listicle of ten "people who mattered" in science

- Awarded for: "people who mattered in science"
- Sponsored by: Springer Nature
- Date: Annually since December 21, 2011
- Presented by: Nature
- Website: nature.com

Nature's 10 is an annual listicle of ten "people who mattered" in science, produced by the scientific journal Nature. Nominees have made a significant impact in science either for good or for bad. Reporters and editorial staff at Nature judge nominees to have had "a significant impact on the world, or their position in the world may have had an important impact on science". Short biographical profiles describe the people behind some of the year's most important discoveries and events. Alongside the ten, five "ones to watch" for the following year are also listed.

== 2025 ==
2025 awardees includeded:

1. Susan Monarez: Public-health guardian
2. Achal Agrawal: Retraction detective
3. Tony Tyson: Telescope pioneer
4. Precious Matsoso: Pandemic negotiator
5. Sarah Tabrizi: Huntington's hero
6. Mengran Du: Deep diver
7. Luciano Moreira: Mosquito rancher
8. Liang Wenfeng: Tech disruptor
9. Yifat Merbl: Peptide detective
10. KJ Muldoon: Trailblazing baby

Ones to watch in 2026:

1. Reid Wiseman: Mission commander Artemis II, NASA
2. Georgina Long: Medical oncologist, Melanoma Institute Australia, University of Sydney
3. Amadou Sall: Virologist, Pasteur Institute of Dakar
4. Alice Xiang: Global head of AI governance, Sony AI
5. Colette Delawalla: Chief executive and founder, Stand Up for Science

== 2024 ==
2024 awardees included:

1. Ekkehard Peik: Father time
2. Kaitlin Kharas: Fair-pay champion
3. Li Chunlai: Moon-rock guardian
4. Anna Abalkina: Fraud buster
5. Huji Xu: Daring doctor
6. Muhammad Yunus: Nation builder
7. Placide Mbala: Virus hunter
8. Cordelia Bähr: Climate crusader
9. Rémi Lam: AI weather sleuth
10. Wendy Freedman: Cosmic ranger

Ones to watch in 2025:

1. Mark Thomson: Next director-general, CERN
2. Emma Hodcroft: Co-founder, Pathoplexus
3. Donald Trump: US president-elect

== 2023 ==
2023 awardees included:

1. Kalpana Kalahasti: To the Moon
2. Marina Silva: Amazon protector
3. Katsuhiko Hayashi: Rewiring reproduction
4. Annie Kritcher: Fusion igniter
5. Eleni Myrivili: Warming warden
6. Ilya Sutskever: AI visionary
7. James Hamlin: Superconductivity sleuth
8. Svetlana Mojsov: Unsung drug developer
9. Halidou Tinto: Malaria fighter
10. Thomas Powles: Cancer explorer

Special awardee:

1. ChatGPT: Boon and burden?

Ones to watch in 2024:

1. Monica M. Bertagnolli, Director, US National Institutes of Health
2. Colin Waters, Chair, Anthropocene Working Group
3. Ilan Gur, Chief executive, UK Advanced Research and Invention Agency
4. Muhammad Masroor Alam, Molecular biologist, Pakistan National Institutes of Health

== 2022 ==
2022 awardees included:

1. Jane Rigby: Sky hunter
2. Yunlong Cao: COVID predictor
3. Saleemul Huq: Climate revolutionary
4. Svitlana Krakovska: Voice for Ukraine
5. Dimie Ogoina: Monkeypox watchman
6. Lisa McCorkell: Long-COVID advocate
7. Diana Greene Foster: Abortion fact-finder
8. António Guterres: Crisis diplomat
9. Muhammad Mohiuddin: Transplant trailblazer
10. Alondra Nelson: Policy principal

Ones to watch in 2023:

1. Sherry Rehman, Minister of climate change, Pakistan
2. Nallathamby Kalaiselvi, Indian Council of Scientific and Industrial Research
3. Sun Chunlan, Chinese Communist Party
4. Renee Wegrzyn, US Advanced Research Projects Agency for Health
5. Anthony Tyson, University of California, Davis

== 2021 ==
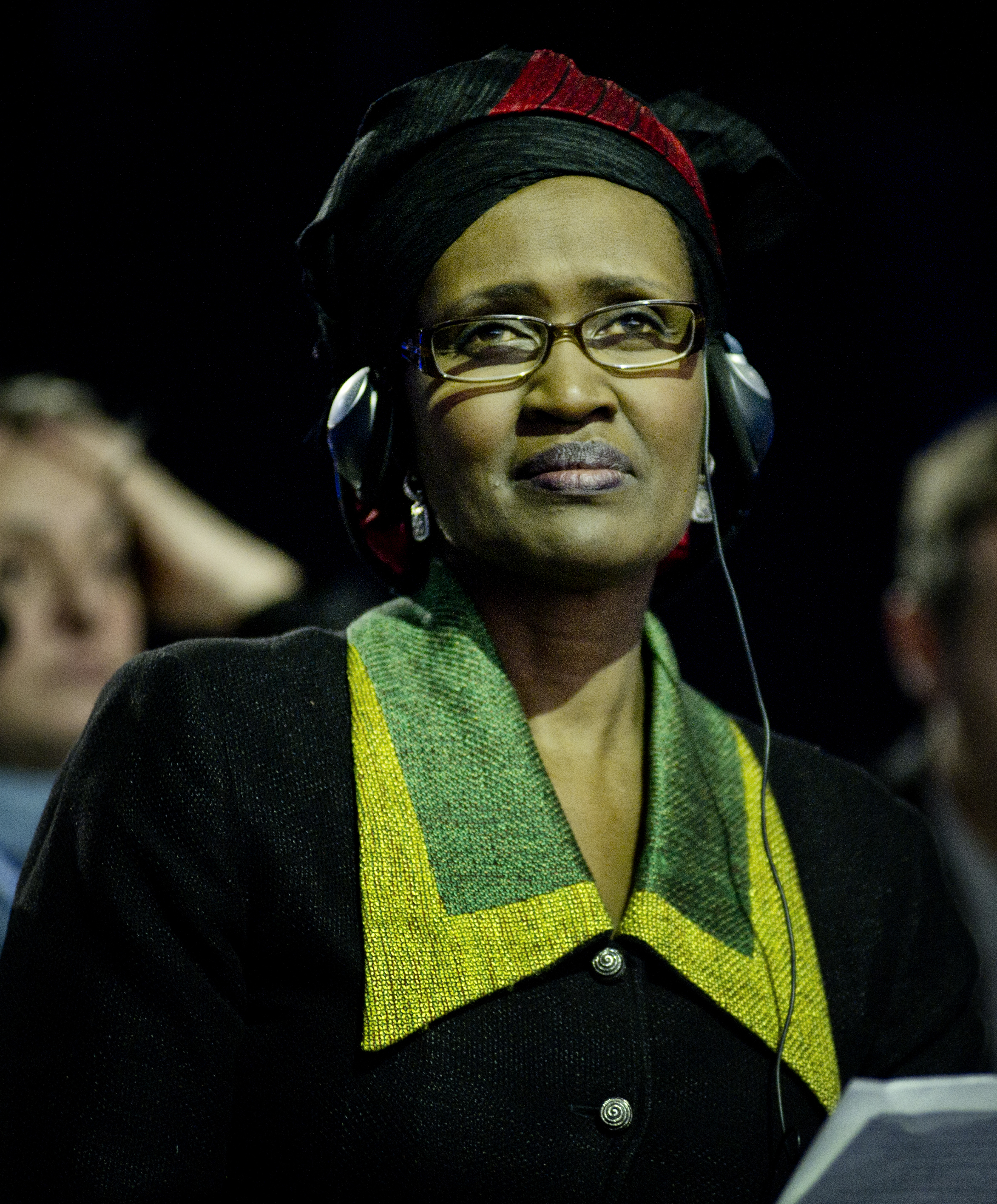
Winnie Byanyima was nominated in 2021 for her work on COVID-19 vaccine equity. She is the executive director of UNAIDS.

2021 awardees included:

1. Winnie Byanyima vaccine warrior
2. Friederike Otto, weather detective
3. Zhang Rongqiao, Mars explorer
4. Timnit Gebru, AI ethics leader
5. Tulio de Oliveira, variant tracker
6. John Jumper, protein predictor
7. Victoria Tauli-Corpuz, indigenous defender
8. Guillaume Cabanac, deception sleuth
9. Meaghan Kall, COVID communicator
10. Janet Woodcock, drug chief

Ones to watch in 2022:

1. Chikwe Ihekweazu, epidemiologist at the WHO Hub for Pandemic and Epidemic Intelligence
2. Jane Rigby, astrophysicist at the NASA Goddard Space Flight Center
3. Love Dalén, geneticist at the Swedish Museum of Natural History
4. Xie Zhenhua, China's special envoy on climate change
5. Graziano Venanzoni, physicist at the Italian National Institute for Nuclear Physics

== 2020 ==
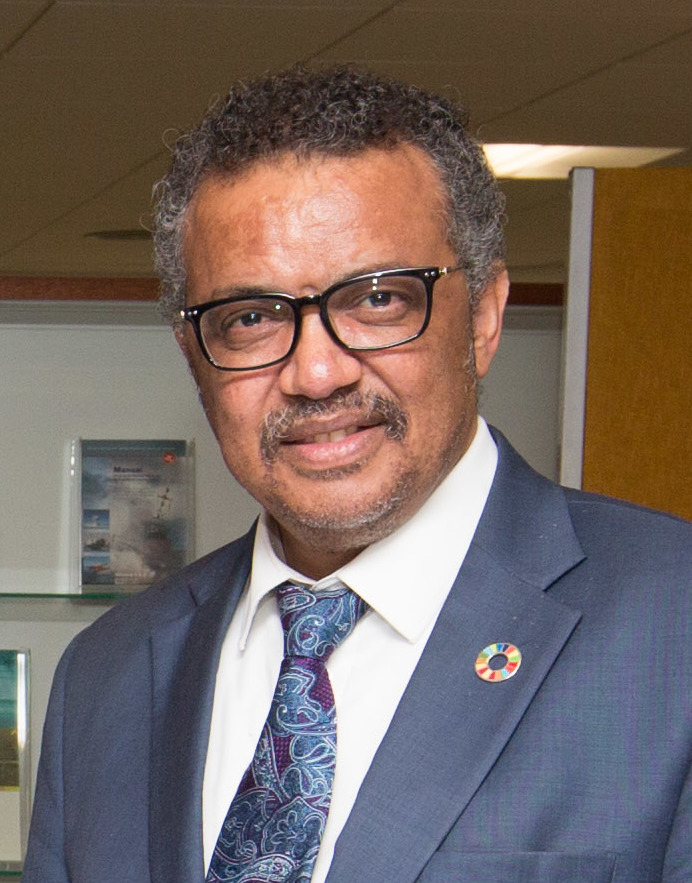
Tedros Ghebreyesus was nominated in 2020 for his work as the Director-General of the World Health Organization.

2020 awardees included:

1. Tedros Ghebreyesus, Warning the world
2. Verena Mohaupt, Polar patroller
3. Gonzalo Moratorio, Coronavirus hunter
4. Adi Utarini, Mosquito commander
5. Kathrin Jansen, Vaccine leader
6. Zhang Yongzhen, Genome sharer
7. Chanda Prescod-Weinstein, A force in physics
8. Li Lanjuan, Lockdown architect
9. Jacinda Ardern, Crisis leader
10. Anthony Fauci, Science’s defender

Ones to watch in 2021:

1. Marion Koopmans, Erasmus University Medical Center, Rotterdam, the Netherlands
2. Zhang Rongqiao, China National Space Administration
3. Karen Miga, University of California, Santa Cruz
4. Rochelle Walensky, Harvard Medical School, Boston, Massachusetts
5. Jane Greaves, Cardiff University, UK

== 2019 ==
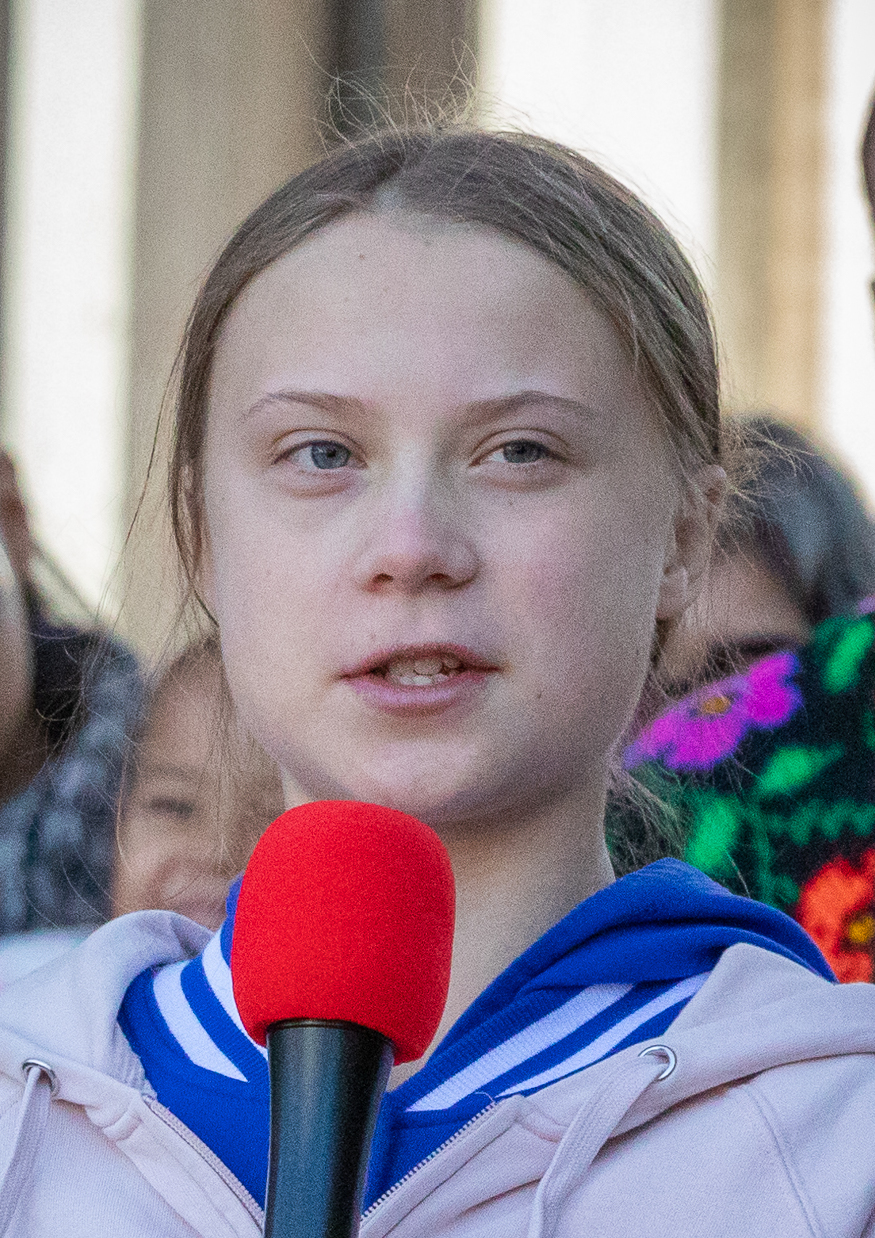
Greta Thunberg was nominated in 2019 for her work as a climate catalyst.

2019 awardees included:

1. Ricardo Galvão: Science defender
2. Victoria Kaspi: Sky sleuth
3. Nenad Sestan: Neuroscientist
4. Sandra Díaz: Biodiversity guardian
5. Jean-Jacques Muyembe-Tamfum: Ebola fighter
6. Yohannes Haile-Selassie: Origin seeker
7. Wendy Rogers: Transplant ethicist
8. Deng Hongkui: CRISPR translator
9. John M. Martinis: Quantum builder
10. Greta Thunberg: Climate catalyst

Ones to watch in 2020:

1. António Guterres: Secretary-general, United Nations
2. Denis Rebrikov: Kulakov National Medical Research Center for Obstetrics, Gynecology and Perinatology, Moscow
3. Geng Meiyu: Shanghai Institute of Materia Medica, China
4. Mariya Gabriel: European Commissioner for Innovation, Research, Culture, Education and Youth
5. Markus Rex: Alfred Wegener Institute, Germany

== 2018 ==
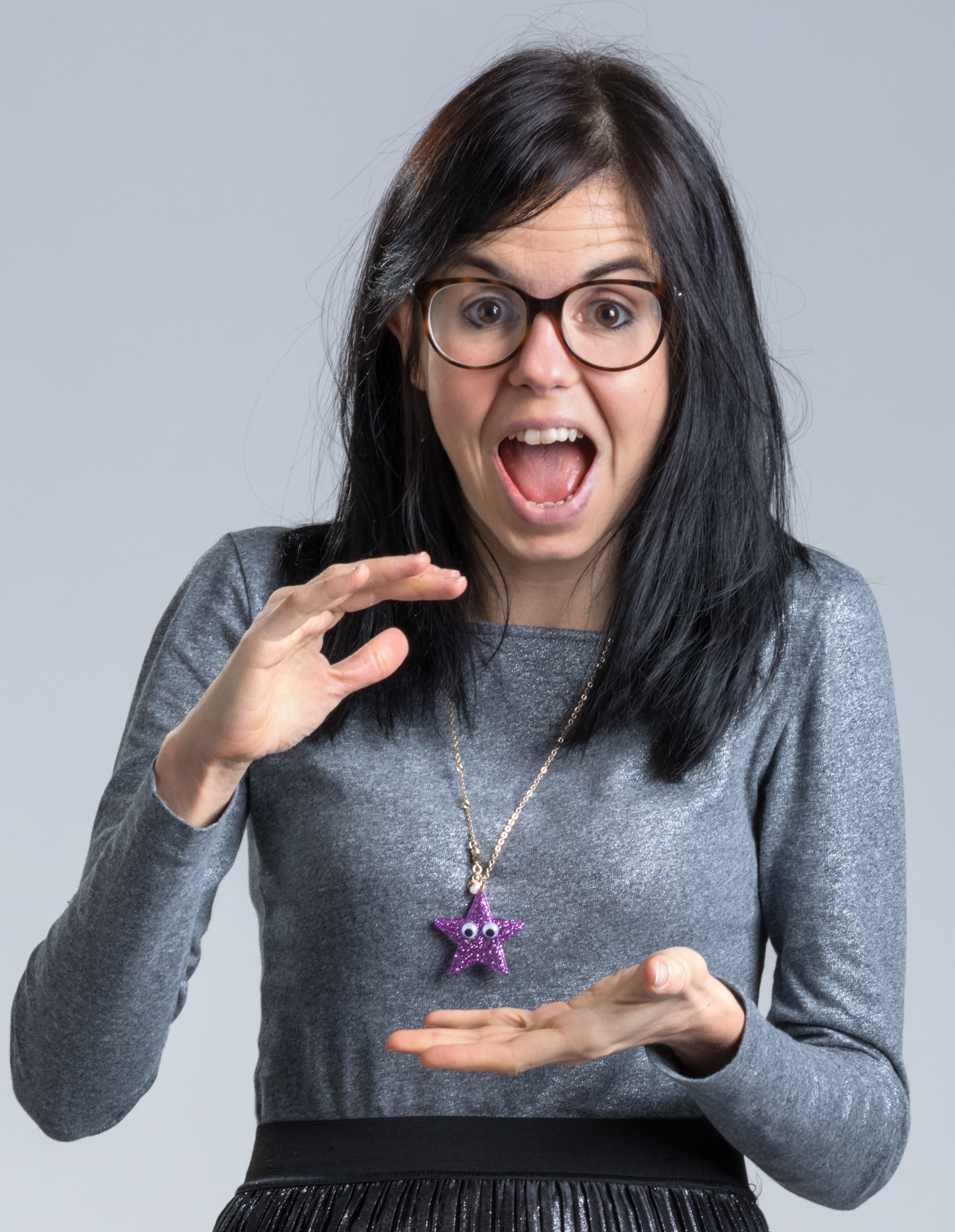
Jess Wade was nominated in 2018 for her work as a diversity champion

2018 awardees included:

1. Yuan Cao: Graphene wrangler
2. Viviane Slon: Humanity's historian
3. He Jiankui: CRISPR rogue
4. Jess Wade: Diversity champion
5. Valérie Masson-Delmotte: Earth monitor
6. Anthony Brown: Star mapper
7. Yeo Bee Yin: Force for the environment
8. Barbara Rae-Venter: DNA detective
9. Robert-Jan Smits: Open-access leader
10. Makoto Yoshikawa: Asteroid hunter

Ones to watch in 2019:

1. Jean-Jacques Muyembe-Tamfum, Director-general of the Democratic Republic of the Congo National Institute for Biomedical Research
2. Julia Olson, Co-counsel in Juliana v. United States
3. Muthayya Vanitha, Director of India's Chandrayaan-2 Moon mission
4. Maura McLaughlin, Chair at the North American Nanohertz Observatory for Gravitational Waves
5. Sandra Díaz, Co-leader of the Intergovernmental Science-Policy Platform on Biodiversity and Ecosystem Services (IPBES) Global Assessment of Biodiversity and Ecosystem Services

== 2017 ==
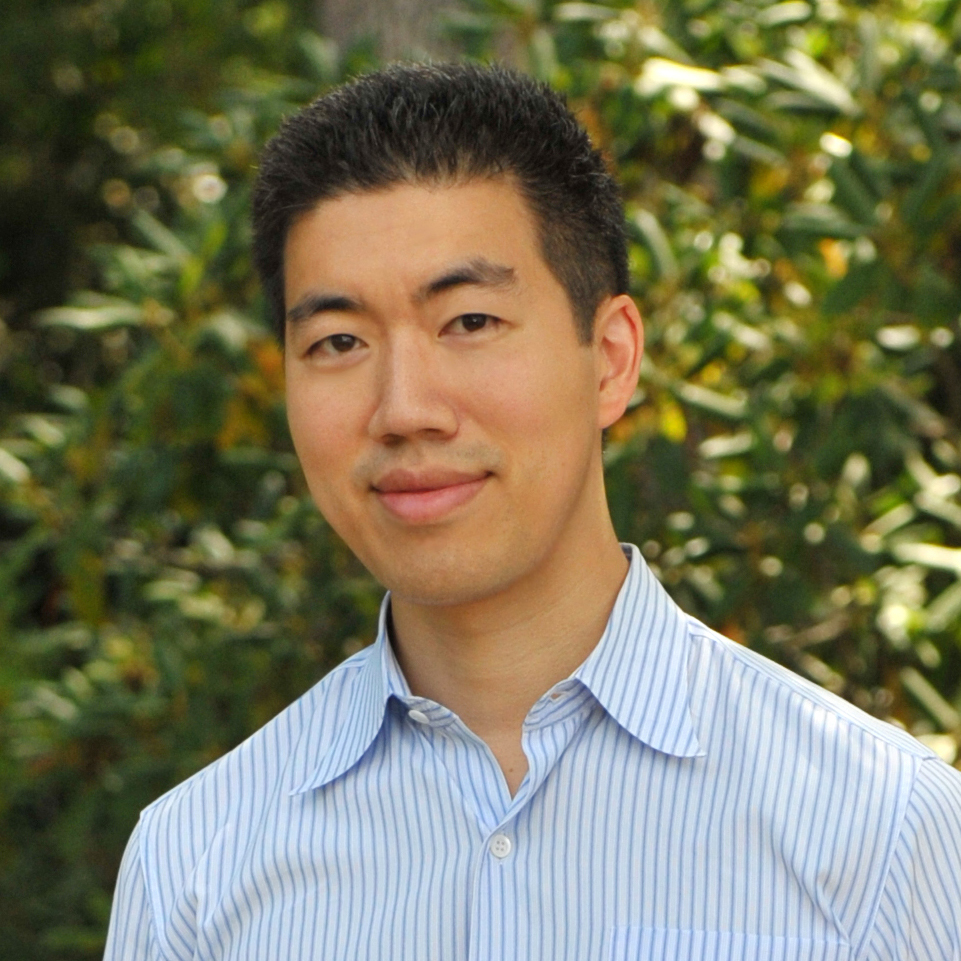
David R. Liu was nominated in 2017 for his work as a gene corrector

2017 awardees included:

1. David R. Liu: Gene corrector
2. Marica Branchesi: Merger maker
3. Emily Whitehead: Living testimonial
4. Scott Pruitt: Agency dismantler
5. Pan Jianwei: Father of quantum
6. Jennifer Byrne: Error sleuth
7. Lassina Zerbo: Test-ban tracker
8. Victor Cruz-Atienza: Quake chaser
9. Ann Olivarius: Legal champion
10. Khaled Toukan: Opening SESAME

Ones to watch in 2018:

1. Shaughnessy Naughton, President of 314 Action
2. Mark Walport, Chief executive of United Kingdom Research and Innovation (UKRI)
3. Kate Crawford, Co-founder of AI Now Institute
4. John M. Martinis, Team leader of Quantum computing at Google
5. Patricia Espinosa, Executive secretary of the United Nations Framework Convention on Climate Change (UNFCC)

== 2016 ==
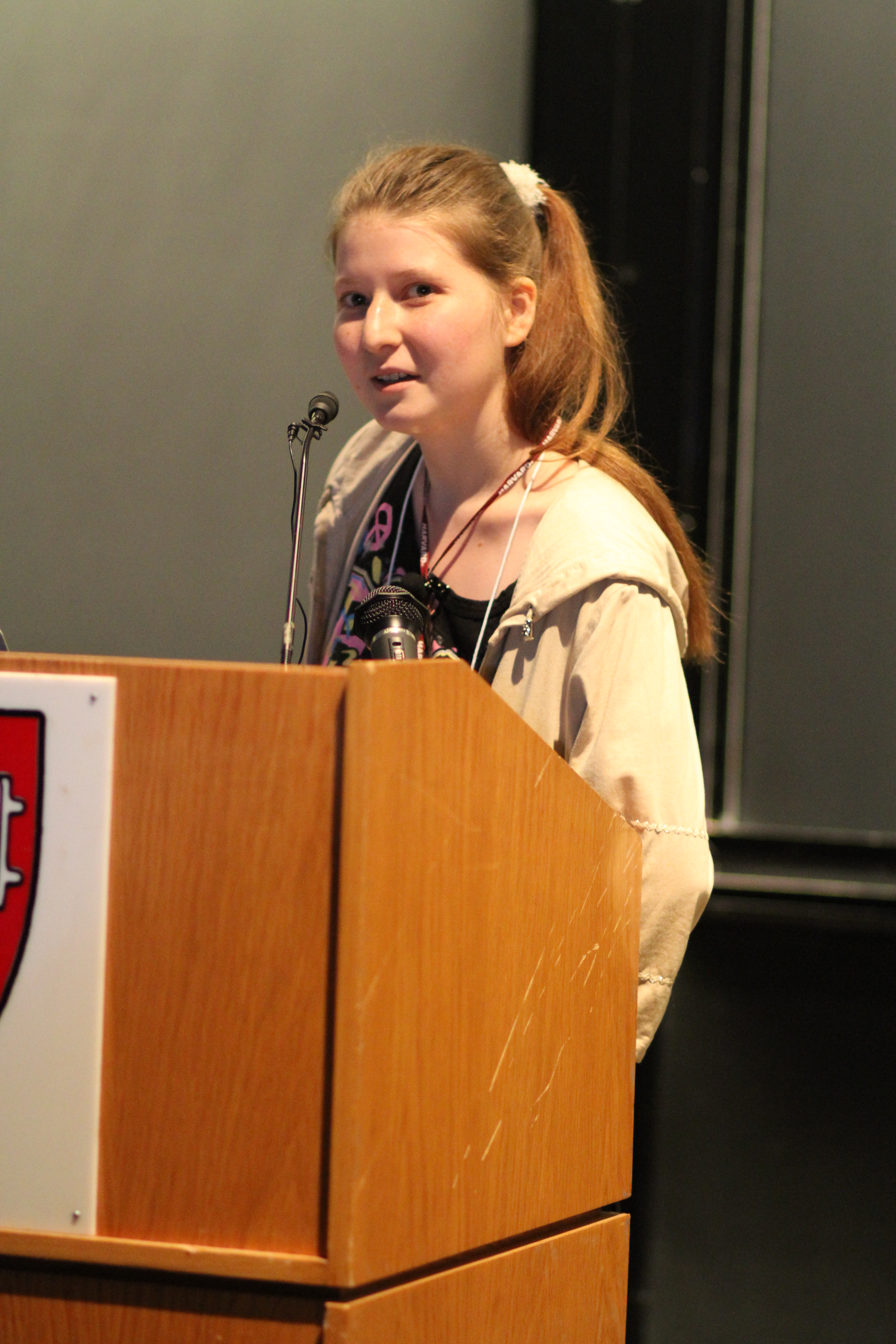
Alexandra Elbakyan was nominated in 2016 for her work on Sci-Hub

2016 awardees included:

1. Gabriela Gonzalez: Gravity spy
2. Demis Hassabis: Mind crafter
3. Terry Hughes: Reef sentinel
4. Guus Velders: Cooling agent
5. Celina M. Turchi: Zika detective
6. Alexandra Elbakyan: Paper pirate
7. John J. Zhang: Fertility rebel
8. Kevin Esvelt: CRISPR cautionary
9. Guillem Anglada-Escudé: Planet hunter
10. Elena Long: Diversity trailblazer

Ones to watch in 2017:

1. Cori Bargmann, Science president, Chan Zuckerberg Initiative
2. Robert Feidenhans’l, Chairman, European XFEL
3. Jef Boeke, Co-leader, Human Genome Project–Write
4. Wu Weiren, Chief Designer, China Lunar Programme
5. Marcia McNutt, President, National Academy of Sciences

== 2015 ==
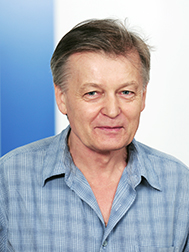
Mikhail Eremets was nominated in 2015 for his work on electrical resistance and conductance

2015 awardees included:

1. Christiana Figueres: Climate guardian
2. Junjiu Huang: Embryo editor
3. Alan Stern: Pluto hunter
4. Zhenan Bao: Master of materials
5. Ali Akbar Salehi: Nuclear diplomat
6. Joan Schmelz: A voice for women
7. David Reich: Genome archaeologist
8. Mikhail Eremets: Super conductor
9. Christina Smolke: Fermenting revolution
10. Brian Nosek: Bias blaster

Ones to watch in 2016:

1. Fabiola Gianotti, Director-general of CERN
2. Gabriela González, Spokesperson at Advanced LIGO
3. Kathy Niakan, Stem-cell biologist, Francis Crick Institute
4. Demis Hassabis, Co-founder, DeepMind
5. Yang Wei, Head of the National Natural Science Foundation of China

== 2014 ==
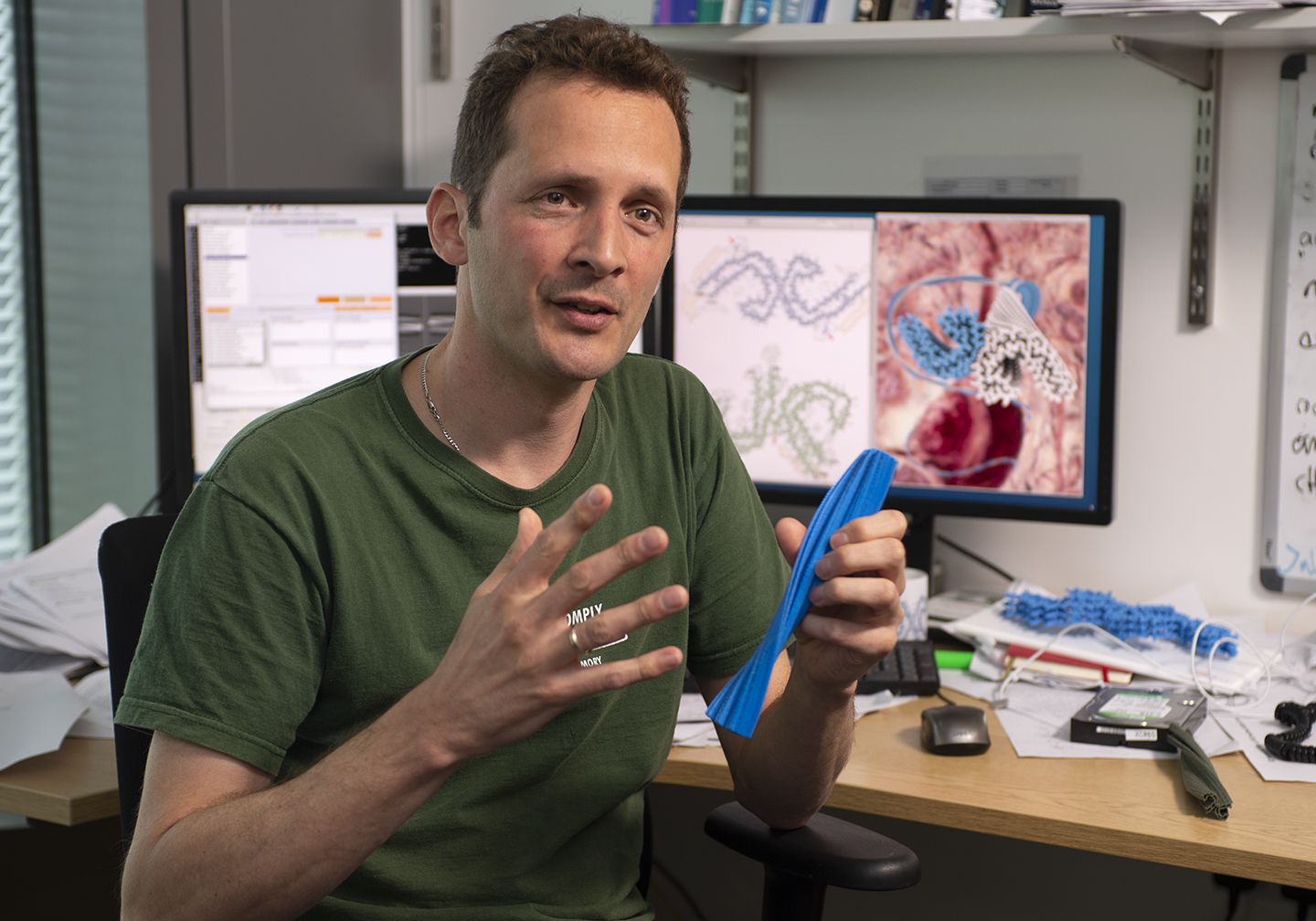
Sjors Scheres was nominated in 2014 for his work on Cryogenic electron microscopy

2014 awardees included:

1. Andrea Accomazzo: Comet chaser
2. Suzanne L. Topalian: Cancer combatant
3. Radhika Nagpal: Robot-maker
4. Sheik Umar Khan: Ebola doctor
5. David Spergel: Cosmic skeptic
6. Maryam Mirzakhani: Surface explorer
7. Pete Frates: Ice-bucket challenger
8. Koppillil Radhakrishnan: Rocket launcher
9. Masayo Takahashi: Stem-cell tester
10. Sjors Scheres: Structure solver

Ones to watch in 2015:

1. Xie Zhenhua, China's top climate official
2. Alan Stern, Principal investigator of NASA's New Horizons mission
3. Joanne Liu, International president of Médecins Sans Frontières (MSF)
4. Bernard Bigot, Nominated as next director-general of ITER
5. Rick Horwitz, Executive director, Allen Institute for Cell Science

== 2013 ==
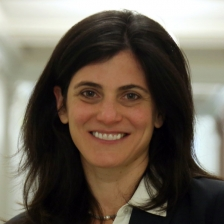
Tania Simoncelli was nominated for her work on science policy and gene patents

2013 awardees included:

1. Feng Zhang: DNA's master editor
2. Tania Simoncelli: Gene patent foe
3. Deborah Persaud: Viral victor
4. Michel Mayor: In search of sister Earths
5. Naderev Saño: Climate conscience
6. Viktor Grokhovsky: Meteorite hunter
7. Hualan Chen: Front-line flu sleuth
8. Shoukhrat Mitalipov: The cloning chief
9. Kathryn Clancy: An eye on harassment
10. Henry Snaith: Sun worshipper

Ones to watch in 2014:

1. Masayo Takahashi, RIKEN Center for Developmental Biology
2. Christopher Field of the Intergovernmental Panel on Climate Change
3. Jean-Pierre Bourguignon Incoming president, European Research Council (ERC)
4. Koppillil Radhakrishnan Chairman, Indian Space Research Organisation
5. Gordon Sanghera from Oxford Nanopore Technologies

== 2012 ==
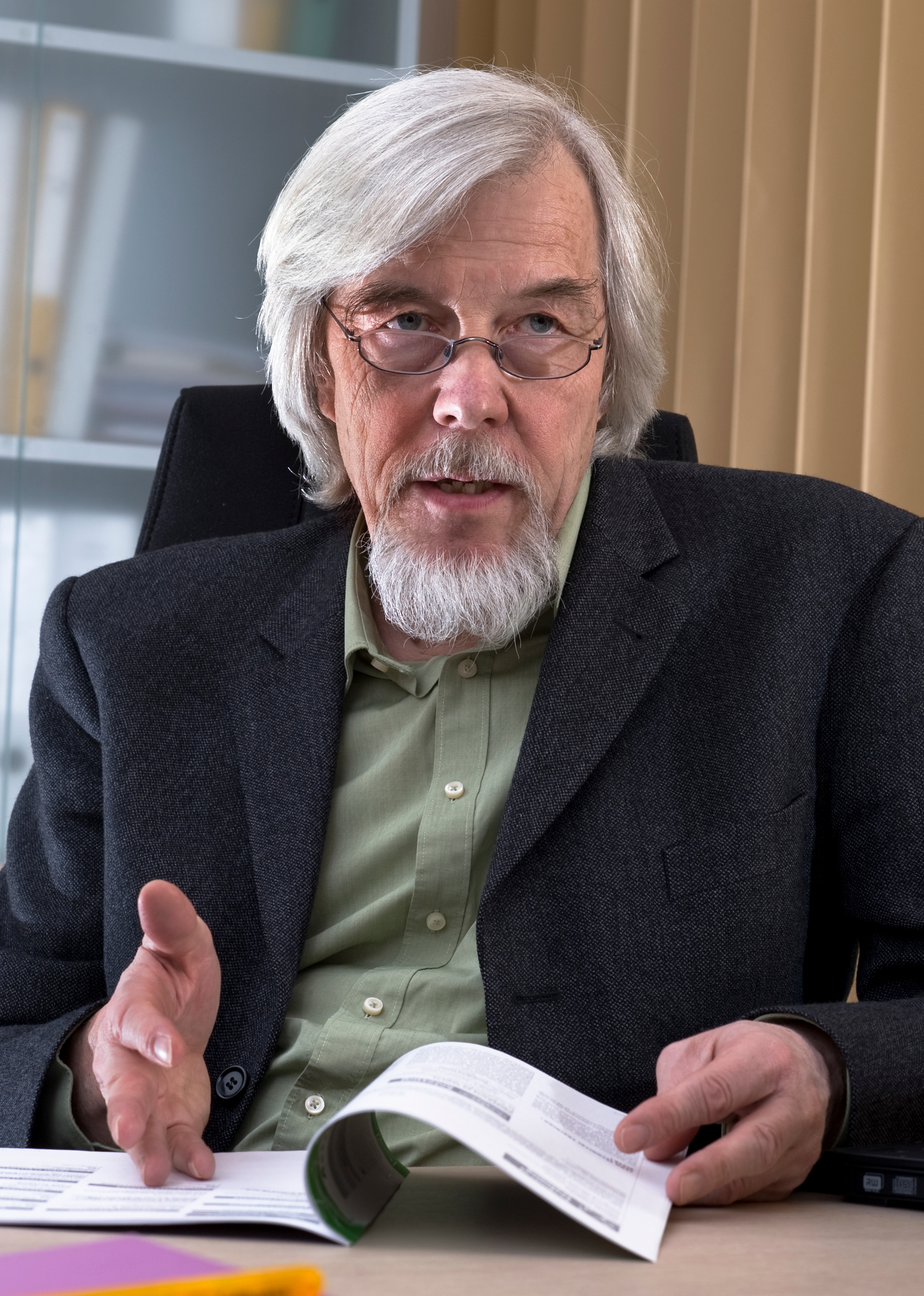
Rolf-Dieter Heuer of CERN was nominated for his work on the Higgs boson

2012 awardees included:

1. Rolf-Dieter Heuer: The Higgs diplomat
2. Cynthia E. Rosenzweig: Guardian of Gotham
3. Adam Steltzner: Our man on Mars
4. Cédric Blanpain: Cell tracker
5. Elizabeth Iorns: Replication hound
6. Jun Wang: Genome juggernaut
7. Jo Handelsman: The bias detective
8. Tim Gowers: Seed of discontent
9. Bernardo De Bernardinis: On the fault line
10. Ron Fouchier: Flu fighter

Ones to watch in 2013:

1. Anne Glover, European Commission chief science adviser
2. Thomas Stocker, of the Intergovernmental Panel on Climate Change (IPCC)
3. Chris Austin, US National Center for Advancing Translational Sciences
4. Jan Tauber, the European Space Agency’s Planck mission
5. Rafael Yuste, of Columbia University, New York

== 2011 ==
Rosie Redfield was nominated in 2011 for her work on arsenic biochemistry and open science

2011 awardees included:

1. Dario Autiero: Relativity challenger
2. Sara Seager: Planet seeker
3. Lisa Jackson: Pollution cop
4. Essam Sharaf: Science revolutionary
5. Diederik Stapel: Fallen star
6. Rosie Redfield: Critical enquirer
7. Danica May Camacho: Child of the times
8. Mike Lamont: The Higgs mechanic
9. Tatsuhiko Kodama: Fukushima's gadfly
10. John Rogers: Tech executive
