= Diana Greene Foster =

American demographer and reproductive health researcher (born 1971)

- Born: 1971 (age 54–55)
- Education: University of California, Berkeley; Princeton University (MA, PhD)
- Scientific career
- Workplaces: University of California, San Francisco
- Thesis: Contraceptive use for birth spacing in sub-Saharan Africa (1998)

Diana Greene Foster (born 1971) is an American demographer and professor of obstetrics, gynaecology and reproductive sciences at the University of California, San Francisco. She uses quantitative models to understand how reproductive health policies impact women's lives and to evaluate the effectiveness of family planning policies.

== Early life and education ==
Foster was an undergraduate student at University of California, Berkeley. After graduating from Berkeley with a BS in 1992, she moved to Princeton University for graduate studies, where she investigated contraceptive use in sub-Saharan Africa, receiving her MA and PhD from Princeton.

== Research and career ==
Foster is a demographer who uses quantitative models to understand the impact of family planning policies. She led the Turnaway Study, a longitudinal investigation that evaluated the health of women who seek abortion. The Turnaway Study involved 1,000 women, some of whom were denied an abortion because they were beyond the gestational limit of their local clinic. She found that women who received abortions experienced less chronic pain and better health outcomes than those who were denied abortion. She used credit studies to demonstrate that women who had been denied an abortion suffered financially for years. The Turnaway Study inspired a theatrical play called "The Turnaway Play" which debuted in May 2024 in Ithaca, NY and continues to be performed across the United States. She investigated the impact of California Family PACT (Planning, Access, Care, and Treatment), and showed that the long term provision of contraception reduced the amount of unintended pregnancy.

After the Supreme Court of the United States decided to overturn Roe v. Wade, Foster started investigating how people navigated the complex array of family planning provision in the United States. Her new study focused on the states in which abortions were completely banned and how that affected navigating medical emergencies, but the federal funding for it was taken away after six months. Similar recent publications responding to the 2022 ruling in Dobbs v. Jackson Women's Health Organization sought to supplement conjecture in controversial court decisions with scientific evidence uncovered by Foster and her team.

== Awards and honors ==
- 2021 Harriet B. Presser Award
- 2022 Nature's 10
- 2023 MacArthur Fellows Program

== Selected publications ==
- M Antonia Biggs; Ushma D Upadhyay; Charles E McCulloch; Foster, Diana Greene (2016). "Women's Mental Health and Well-being 5 Years After Receiving or Being Denied an Abortion: A Prospective, Longitudinal Cohort Study". JAMA Psychiatry. 74 (2): 169–178. doi:10.1001/jamapsychiatry.2016.3478. PMID 27973641. Wikidata Q39101301.
- Diana Greene Foster; M Antonia Biggs; Ralph, Lauren J.; Caitlin Gerdts; Sarah Roberts; Glymour, Maria (2018). "Socioeconomic Outcomes of Women Who Receive and Women Who Are Denied Wanted Abortions in the United States". American Journal of Public Health. 108 (3): 407–413. doi:10.2105/ajph.2017.304247. PMID 29345993. Wikidata Q89897696.
- M. Antonia Biggs; Heather Gould; Foster, Diana Greene (2013). "Understanding why women seek abortions in the US". BMC Women's Health. 13: 29. doi:10.1186/1472-6874-13-29. PMC 3729671. PMID 23829590. Wikidata Q34800194.

== Selected talks ==
Foster, Diana Greene (2024-01-11). What happens when we deny people abortions? – via www.ted.com.
