= Elena Long =

Physicist

- Born: Elena Amanda Long
- Alma mater: Juniata College; Kent State University (PhD)
- Awards: Nature's 10: Ten people who mattered (2016) oSTEM Global STEM Service Award (2014)
- Scientific career
- Workplaces: University of New Hampshire; Thomas Nelson Community College; Kent State University
- Thesis: Polarized ^{3}He(e, e′n) Asymmetries in Three Orthogonal Measurements (2012)
- Doctoral advisor: Bryon Anderson; Douglas Higinbotham
- Website: nuclear.unh.edu/~elong

Elena Amanda Long is associate professor of physics at the University of New Hampshire and is an activist for LGBT people in science. The journal Nature called her a "diversity trailblazer" in their Nature's 10: Ten people who mattered this year in 2016. Long's research on the internal structure of nucleons earned her a 2015 Jefferson Science Associates (JSA) Promising Young Scientist award. Long has made significant contributions to improve the inclusion of under-represented researchers and students by founding the LGBT+ Physics organisation and serving as a member of the American Physical Society (APS) Committee of LGBT Issues.

== Education ==
Long was educated at Kent State University where she successfully defended her PhD thesis in 2012, on Polarized ^{3}He(e, e'n) Asymmetries in Three Orthogonal Measurements which provides important tests of models that use Helium-3 as a neutron target. Long earned a bachelor's degree in Physics from Juniata College in 2006

== Research and career ==
Long's research in atomic physics focuses on understanding how the quarks inside of protons and neutrons interact to form atomic nuclei. She has worked on the deuteron structure as well as attempts to detect the first measurement on the quasi-elastic tensor asymmetry A_{zz.} The A_{zz} experiment can provide information about nucleon-nucleon calculations at the relativistic level, as well as provide new experimental constraints on decade-old questions about deuteron wavefunctions. An explanation of the A_{zz} experiment described for a six year old can be found on Long's research page.

Long's postdoctoral research at the University of New Hampshire, involved the construction of the polarised target lab in DeMeritt Hall. In 2014 Long was elected to the Jefferson Lab User's Group Board of Directors as a postdoc representative. Long held this position until 2016.

=== Public engagement ===
In 2009 Long founded the LGBT+ Physicists organisation which serves as a networking resource for gender and sexual minority (GSM) physicists as well as providing a yearly award named the Acknowledgement of Excellence Awards. Long worked with the American Physical Society for their 2012 meeting, ensuring invited speakers and participants were able to share their experiences as LGBT+ physicists in a special session which was attended by over 100 people. A summary of the discussions titled Gender and Sexual Diversity Issues in Physics: The Audience Speaks co-written by Long, is quoted as the start of a grassroots movement to produce guides for the LGBT+ scientific community.

Long has served as the Vice President of Diversity and Inclusion for Out in Science, Technology, Engineering and Mathematics (oSTEM), Inc, a 501(c)(3) organization and non-profit professional society focused on LGBTQ people in the STEM community.

In an interview with the Society of Physics Students (SPS) Observer Long spoke about the driving force behind her efforts to increase support for LGBT physicists:

"I want there to be more LGBT physicists, and I don't want young people to look at this career and find people telling them to never be themselves at their job. I don't want anyone else to have to go through what I did"

Long was honoured as one of Nature's 10: Ten people who mattered this year in 2016 as a 'Diversity trailblazer'. As part of this recognition, Long was named as one of the architects of a first-of-its-kind survey called LGBT+ Climate in Physics run by the American Physical Society (APS), gathering experiences of physicists in the LGBTQ+ community.

== Awards and honors ==
Long's awards and honors include:

- 2017: University of New Hampshire Kidder Fund
- 2017: Juniata College Young Alumni Achievement award
- 2016: Nature's 10: Ten people who mattered in 2016
- 2016: Jefferson Science Associates Postdoctoral Prize
- 2014: Jefferson Science Associates Promising Young Scientist
- 2014: oSTEM Global STEM Service Award
