= Wendy Rogers =

Wendy Rogers may refer to:

- Wendy Rogers (politician) (born 1954), American member of the Arizona State Senate
- Wendy Rogers (academic) (born 1957), Australian clinical ethicist and philosopher
