= Makoto Yoshikawa =

Japanese scientist

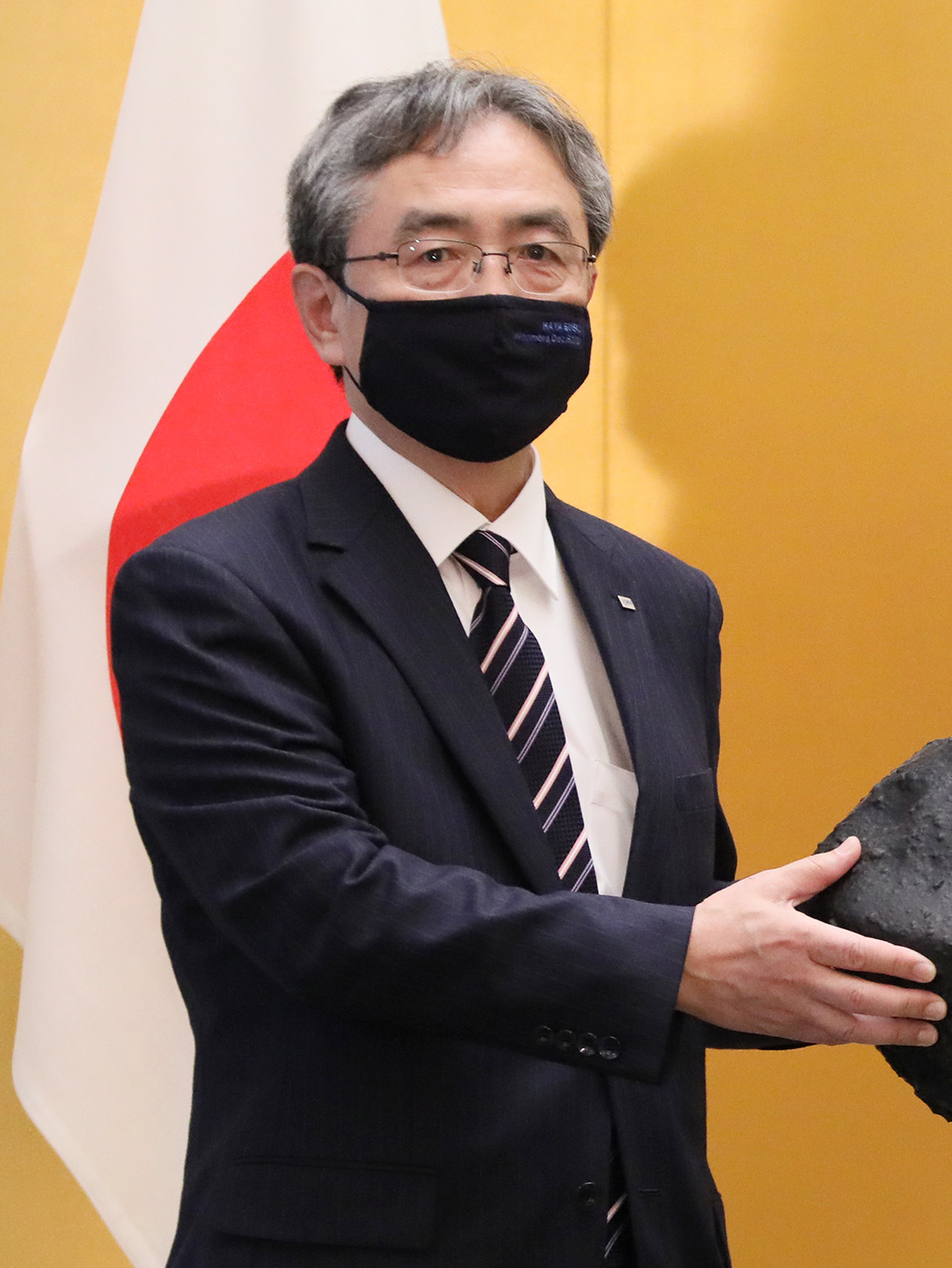
- Born: February 6, 1962 (age 64); Tochigi, Japan
- Scientific career
- Institutions: JAXA

Makoto Yoshikawa (born February 6 1962) is a Japanese scientist, most notable for being project manager and later mission manager of Hayabusa2, an asteroid sample-return mission operated by the Japanese space agency, JAXA, and in 2018 was recognized in Nature's 10, a list of "people who mattered" in science by the journal Nature.

His research specializes in celestial mechanics, particularly in orbital analysis of small Solar System bodies such as asteroids and comets.

== Career and research ==
After his doctorate, he worked as a researcher at the Japan Society for the Protection of Science and then from 1991 was senior researcher at the then Communications Research Laboratory of the Ministry of Posts and Telecommunications. He joined the Institute of Space and Astronautical Science in 1998, which since 2003 has been part of the JAXA. As part of the orbital determination group at ISAS, he was involved with the Hayabusa and Akatsuki missions.
