= Anthony Brown (scientist) =

Dutch astronomer (born 1969)

Anthony G. A. Brown
- Born: 12 May 1969 (age 57)
- Education: University of Leiden (M.S., Ph.D.)
- Scientific career
- Fields: Astronomy
- Doctoral advisor: Tim de Zeeuw

Anthony George Alexander Brown (born 12 May 1969) is a Dutch astronomer currently working at the University of Leiden most noted for leading the Gaia project's Data Processing and Analysis Consortium. He was listed in the 2018 Nature's 10 as one of the 'Ten people who mattered this year' by the scientific journal Nature.

== Biography ==
Anthony Brown obtained his Master of Science degree cum laude in Astronomy from the University of Leiden in 1991, where he also obtained his PhD in 1996 on the topic of the stellar content and evolution of OB associations. After postdoc positions at the University of Leiden, the National Astronomical Observatory (Mexico), and the European Southern Observatory (Germany), he rejoined the University of Leiden first as a research associate from 2001 to 2006, and then as faculty member.

His involvement with the Gaia mission started in 1997 with contributions to the science case for the mission. As a member of the photometric and classification working groups, he contributed to the optimization of the photometric filter system, and has been a member of the Gaia science team since 2006. He was appointed Chair of the Gaia Data Processing and Analysis Consortium (DPAC) Executive in 2012, and is the corresponding author of Gaia Data Release 1 and 2.

He delivered the prestigious Spitzer Lectures at Princeton University in 2019.

== Selected papers ==
- Brown, Anthony GA, et al. "Gaia Data Release 1-Summary of the astrometric, photometric, and survey properties." Astronomy & Astrophysics 595 (2016): A2.
