= John C. Mather =

American astrophysicist and cosmologist (born 1946)

John Cromwell Mather
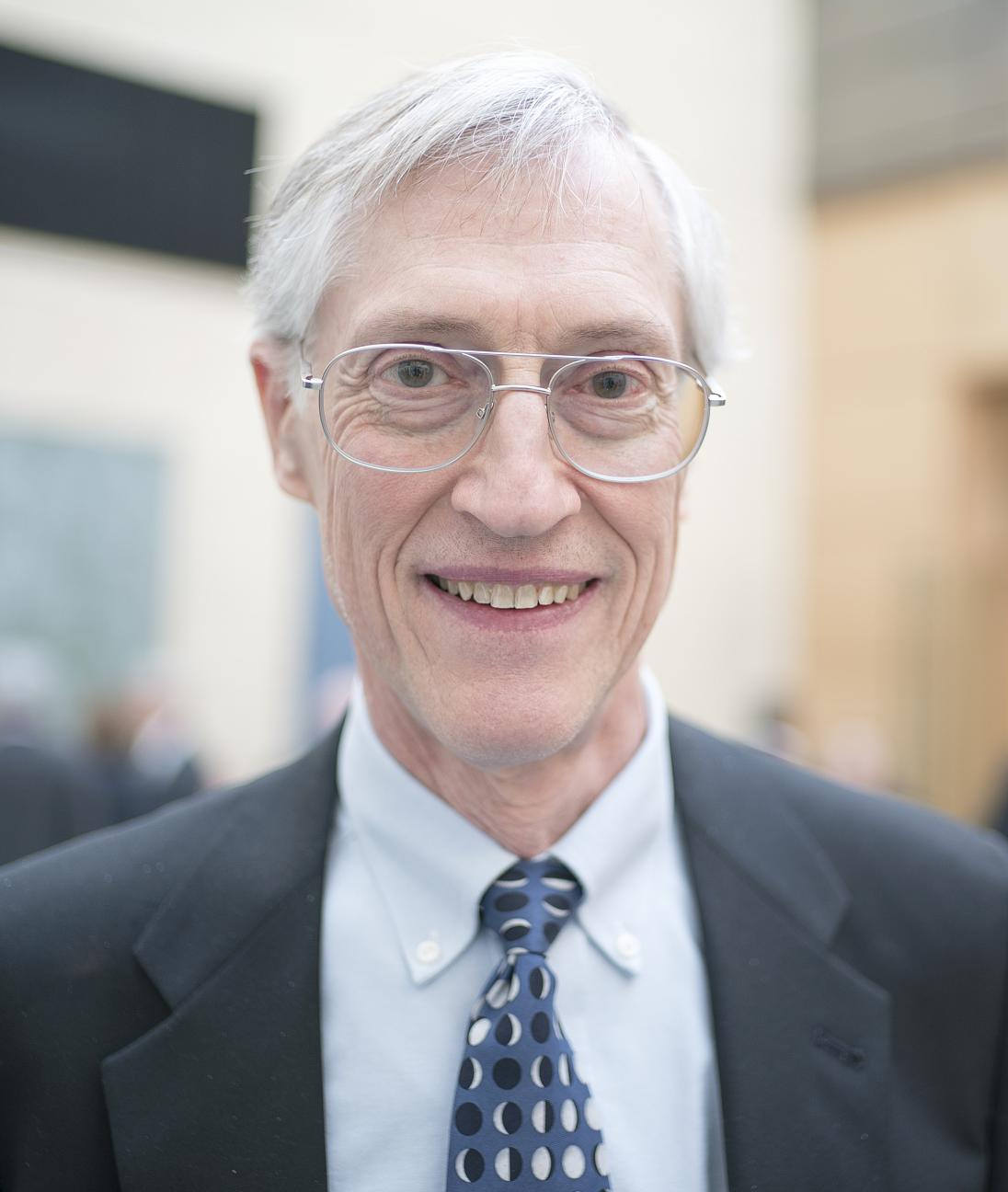
- Mather in 2015
- Born: August 7, 1946 (age 80); Roanoke, Virginia, U.S.
- Education: Swarthmore College (BS); University of California, Berkeley (PhD)
- Known for: Cosmic microwave background radiation studies
- Awards: Dannie Heineman Prize for Astrophysics (1993); Nobel Prize in Physics (2006)
- Scientific career
- Fields: Astrophysics, cosmology
- Workplaces: NASA; University of Maryland; Columbia University
- Thesis: Far Infrared Spectrometry of the Cosmic Background Radiation (1974)
- Doctoral advisor: Paul L. Richards

Signature
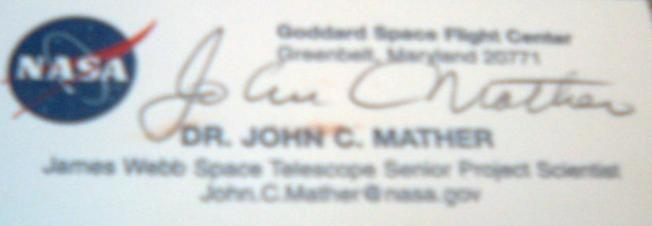

John Cromwell Mather (born August 7, 1946) is an American astrophysicist and cosmologist. He shared the 2006 Nobel Prize in Physics with George Smoot for the "for their discovery of the black body form and anisotropy of the cosmic microwave background radiation".

This work helped cement the Big Bang theory of the universe. According to the Nobel Prize committee, "the COBE-project can also be regarded as the starting point for cosmology as a precision science."

Mather is a senior astrophysicist at the NASA Goddard Space Flight Center (GSFC) in Maryland and adjunct professor of physics at the University of Maryland College of Computer, Mathematical, and Natural Sciences. In 2007, Time magazine listed Mather among the 100 Most Influential People in The World. In October 2012, he was listed again by Time magazine in a special issue on New Space Discoveries as one of the 25 most influential people in space.

Mather is one of the 20 American recipients of the Nobel Prize in Physics to sign a letter addressed to President George W. Bush in May 2008, urging him to "reverse the damage done to basic science research in the Fiscal Year 2008 Omnibus Appropriations Bill" by requesting additional emergency funding for the Department of Energy's Office of Science, the National Science Foundation, and the National Institute of Standards and Technology.

Mather served as the senior project scientist for the James Webb Space Telescope (JWST) from 1995 until 2023, when he was succeeded by Jane Rigby.

In 2014, Mather delivered an address on the James Webb Space Telescope at the second Starmus Festival in the Canary Islands.

== Education and initial research ==
- 1964 Newton High School, Newton, New Jersey
- 1968 B.S. (Physics), Swarthmore College (Highest Honors)
- 1974 Ph.D. (Physics), University of California, Berkeley
- 1974–1976 (NRC Postdoctoral Fellow), Columbia University Goddard Institute for Space Studies

== Honors and awards ==
- 1964–1968 Swarthmore College Open Scholarship (honorary)
- 1967 William Lowell Putnam Mathematical Competition, 30th place nationwide
- 1968 Highest possible score (990), physics Grad Records
- 1968–1970 NSF Fellowship and honorary Woodrow Wilson Fellowship
- 1970–1974 Fellow, Hertz Foundation
- 1974–1976 Postdoctoral Fellow, NRC
- 1990 NASA GSFC John C. Lindsay Memorial Award
- 1991 Rotary National Space Achievement Award
- 1991 National Air and Space Museum Trophy
- 1992 Aviation Week and Space Technology Laurels for Space/Missiles
- 1993 Discover Magazine Technology Award finalist
- 1993 American Institute of Aeronautics and Astronautics Space Science Award
- 1993 American Astronomical Society and American Institute of Physics Dannie Heineman Prize for Astrophysics
- 1994 Fellow, Goddard Space Flight Center
- 1994 Doctor of Science, honoris causa, Swarthmore College
- 1995 City of Philadelphia John Scott Award
- 1996 American Academy of Arts and Sciences Rumford Prize
- 1996 Fellow, American Physical Society
- 1997 Aviation Week and Space Technology Hall of Fame
- 1997 Member, National Academy of Sciences
- 1998 Marc Aaronson Memorial Prize
- 1998 Member, American Academy of Arts and Sciences
- 1999 Franklin Institute Benjamin Franklin Medal in Physics
- 2005 Society of Photo-Optical Instrumentation Engineers George W. Goddard Award
- 2006 Peter and Patricia Gruber Foundation Prize in Cosmology
- 2006 Nobel Prize in Physics
- 2007 Fellow, SPIE - The International Society for Optical Engineering
- 2007 American Academy of Achievement, Golden Plate Award
- 2007 Antoinette de Vaucouleurs Memorial Lectureship and Medal
- 2008 Robinson Prize
- 2008 Doctor of Science, honoris causa, University of Maryland
- 2008, Commencement Speaker, University of Maryland Winter Commencement
- 2010 India General President Gold Medal
- 2010 Fellow of the Optical Society of America
- 2011 Doctor of Science, honoris causa, University of Notre Dame
- 2020 Elected a Legacy Fellow of the American Astronomical Society.
- 2023 Joseph Priestley Award, Dickinson College

== Publications ==
- Mather, J. C. "Far Infrared Spectrometry of the Cosmic Background Radiation", University of California Berkeley, Lawrence Berkeley National Laboratory, United States Department of Energy (through predecessor agency the Atomic Energy Commission), (Jan. 1974).
- Mather, J. C.; Albrecht, A.; et al. "Report of the Dark Energy Task Force", Fermi National Accelerator Laboratory, United States Department of Energy, (2006).
- Mather, J. C.;Boslough, John; the very first light; 1996, 2008 Basic Books
