= Precious Matsoso =

South African public health official

Malebona Precious Matsoso is a South African pharmacist and public health official. She served as director-general of South Africa's Health Department from 2010 to 2019 and has held several leadership positions at the World Health Organization. Matsoso is best known internationally for co-chairing the Intergovernmental Negotiating Body (INB), the body that produced the WHO Pandemic Agreement—the first global treaty on pandemic prevention, preparedness, and response—formally adopted by the 78th World Health Assembly on 20 May 2025.

== Recognition and honours ==
In December 2025, Nature included Matsoso in its annual Nature's 10 list of people who shaped science that year, designating her a "pandemic negotiator." On the same day, she was named Best Negotiator of the Year 2025 by UNITAR and the Doha Forum.

In February 2026, she and fellow INB co-chair Anne-Claire Amprou were jointly named to the TIME100 Health 2026 list.
