= Katsuhiko Hayashi =

Japanese researcher

- Education: Meiji University
- Known for: Clinical application of Induced pluripotent stem cell research
- Scientific career
- Fields: Stem cell research Reproductive biology
- Workplaces: Osaka University

Katsuhiko Hayashi (林 克彥, Hayashi Katsuhiko; born 1972) is a Japanese reproductive geneticist and stem cell researcher. He achieved same-sex reproduction of male mice and thus ranked Nature's 10.
