= Meaghan Kall =

US-UK epidemiologist

- Education: University College, London
- Known for: public communication of epidemiology on Twitter
- Scientific career
- Fields: epidemiologist
- Workplaces: UK Health Security Agency
- Thesis: National longitudinal survey of healthcare needs and risk behaviours of HIV positive people
- Doctoral advisor: Richard Gilson

Meaghan Kall is an epidemiologist at the UK Health Security Agency. In 2021 the journal Nature named her in Nature's 10, their global top ten list of people who helped shape science that year.

== Early life and education ==
Kall grew up in a small, conservative town in Michigan. Kall completed a bachelor of science in nutrition science at Michigan State University and master of health science at Johns Hopkins University. She is completing her doctorate at University College London. Her doctoral thesis is National longitudinal survey of healthcare needs and risk behaviours of HIV positive people and is being supervised by Richard Gilson.

== Career ==
She worked from 2009 to 2020 as a civil servant at Public Health England tracking HIV/AIDS. In 2020 she was drafted into the UK government's COVID-19 response. Her role was as a senior epidemiologist producing data within technical briefing documents and also communicating this information, including to the public. In 2021 she attracted a following on Twitter for her threads explaining epidemiological data. Her adoption of Twitter for public science communication was seen as particularly effective even though this was not part of her official employment. In January 2021, Kall was appointed lead epidemiologist in the COVID-19 Epidemiology cell at the UK Health Security Agency.

== Recognition ==
Kall was included in a list of ten scientists who had had important roles in scientific developments in 2021 compiled by the scientific journal Nature.
