= Mikhail Eremets =

Belarusian experimental physicist (1949–2024)

- Міхаіл Ерамец
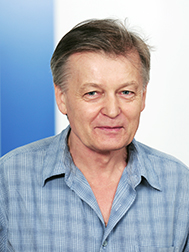
- Eremets in 2013
- Born: Mikhail Ivanovich Eremets; 3 January 1949; Pinsk Region, Byelorussian SSR, USSR
- Died: 16 November 2024 (aged 75); Mainz, Rhineland-Palatinate, Germany
- Education: National Research Nuclear University MEPhI
- Awards: Nature's 10 (2015); Bernd T. Matthias Prize
- Scientific career
- Fields: Physics, chemistry, materials science
- Workplaces: Pierre and Marie Curie University; Carnegie Institution for Science; University of Oxford; Max Planck Institute for Chemistry
- Website: www.mpic.de/en/research/further-groups/eremets-group.html

Mikhail Ivanovich Eremets (3 January 1949 – 16 November 2024) was a Belarusian experimentalist in high pressure physics, chemistry and materials science. He was particularly known for his research on superconductivity, having discovered the highest critical temperature of 250 K (-23 °C) for superconductivity in lanthanum hydride under high pressures. Part of his research contains exotic manifestations of materials such as conductive hydrogen, polymeric nitrogen and transparent sodium.

== Education and early life ==
Eremets was born in the Pinsk Region. He studied physics at the Moscow Engineering Physics Institute (National Research Nuclear University MEPhI). In 1978 he received his PhD at the Moscow Institute of General Physics of the Academy of Sciences of the USSR.

== Research and career ==
Eremets went on to work as a researcher in the High Pressure Physics Institute of the Academy of Sciences in Troitsk (Moscow region), eventually rising to the position of director of the High-Pressure Physics Department. After 1991, Eremets took on positions in several high pressure laboratories around the world, including the University of Paris VI in France, the National Institute for Materials Science in Tokyo and Osaka University in Japan, the Geophysical Laboratory at the Carnegie Institution for Science in the United States, and Clarendon Laboratory at the University of Oxford in the United Kingdom.

In 2001, Eremets joined the Max Planck Institute for Chemistry in Mainz, Germany, as a staff member and leader of the research group "High-pressure chemistry and physics".

Eremets was working on high temperature superconductivity in metallic hydrogen and hydrogen-rich compounds. Additionally he was interested in polymeric nitrogen, the synthesis of novel high energy density materials, the stability of diamonds, extending the present high static pressure limits over 500 GPa and the synthesis of molecules at pressure and temperature conditions occurring in the Earth mantle.

The core facility of the Mikhail Eremets research is a special diamond anvil cell, which can generate extreme pressures between the two diamonds anvils. This has already led to records of static pressure of 440 GPa, which corresponds to 4.4 million atmospheres and exceeds the pressure inside the Earth (360 GPa). The device can be complemented by a laser heating system, a cryostat, magnets and X-ray sources.

In a Nature paper published in summer 2015 Eremets describes how hydrogen sulfide conducts electricity without resistance at minus 70 degrees Celsius and at a pressure of 1.5 million bar. Thus, the 66-year-old researcher established with his team a temperature record for the superconductivity. In their latest experiments, Eremets and his collaborators have found the superconducting temperature of lanthanum hydride to be 250 K, being closer to room temperature by additional 47 K. However, Eremets' team declined to share their experimental data when Jorge E. Hirsch requested it in 2023.

== Death ==
Eremets died on 16 November 2024, at the age of 75.

== Honours and awards ==
- 2023: The Bragg Lecture, University College London
- 2022: Bernd T. Matthias Prize for superconducting materials
- 2020: Breakthrough Winner in Physical Sciences, Falling Walls, Berlin
- 2019: James C. McGroddy Prize for New Materials
- 2017: Bridgman Award AIRAPT
- 2016: Honorary doctorate of the University of Leipzig, Germany
- 2015: Ugo Fano Medal of the Rome International Center for Materials Science of Superstripes (RICMASS)
- 2015: Top Ten listing "People who mattered this year" magazine „Nature“ 2015
- 2015: "Top Ten Breakthroughs of 2015," Physics World magazine
- Visiting professor, Chinese Academy of Sciences.
- Visiting professor, University of Tokyo, Institute for Solid State Physics (ISSP), Japan.
- Visiting Professor, Research Center for Extreme Materials, Osaka University, Japan.
- European Research Council Advanced Grant “Exploring conductive and metallic hydrogen”
