= Celina Turchi =

Brazilian epidemiologist

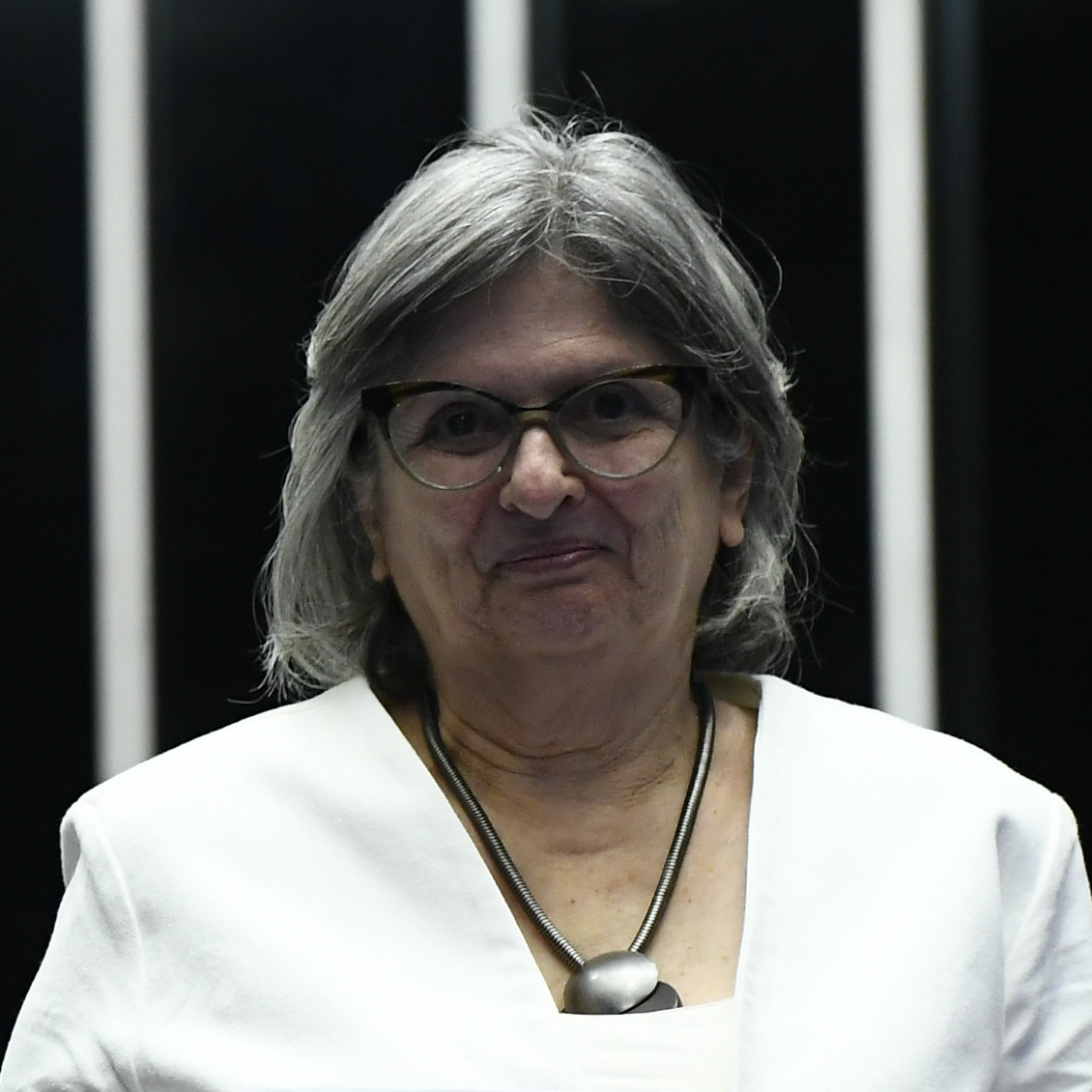
- Born: Celina Maria Turchi Martelli; 1952-1953 (64 years old); Goiás, Brazil
- Education: Federal University of Goias, London School of Hygiene and Tropical Diseases, University of Sao Paulo
- Known for: Research of mosquito-borne diseases
- Scientific career
- Fields: Infectiology
- Workplaces: Federal University of Goias, Oswaldo Cruz Foundation

Celina Maria Turchi Martelli is a Brazilian epidemiologist, graduated by Federal University of Goiás and researcher at Fundação Oswaldo Cruz in Recife. She first associated the link between zika virus and microcephaly in newborn babies during the 2015 disease outbreak in Brazil; she was listed by Nature magazine as one of the 10 most notable people in science in 2016, and by Time magazine as one of the 100 most influential people of 2017.

== Life and career ==
Turchi was born in the state of Goiás. She did her graduation in medicine at the Federal University of Goiás and her master's degree in infectology at the London School of Hygiene and Tropical Medicine and her doctorate at the University of São Paulo. She became interested in research mosquito-borne diseases in 1990, when dengue fever was spread in Goiânia. She was a professor at the Federal University of Goiás until her retirement.

In 2015 Turchi was called by the Brazilian Ministry of Health to investigate the growth of microcephaly cases in newborn babies at the state of Pernambuco. At Fiocruz's Aggeu Magalhães Institute, in Recife, she directed the Microcephaly Epidemic Research Group (MERG), a task force for defining the malformation causes. Her group found that zika virus incubated in pregnant women would have influence on the foetus' lack of cranial development.
