= Marica Branchesi =

Italian astrophysicist

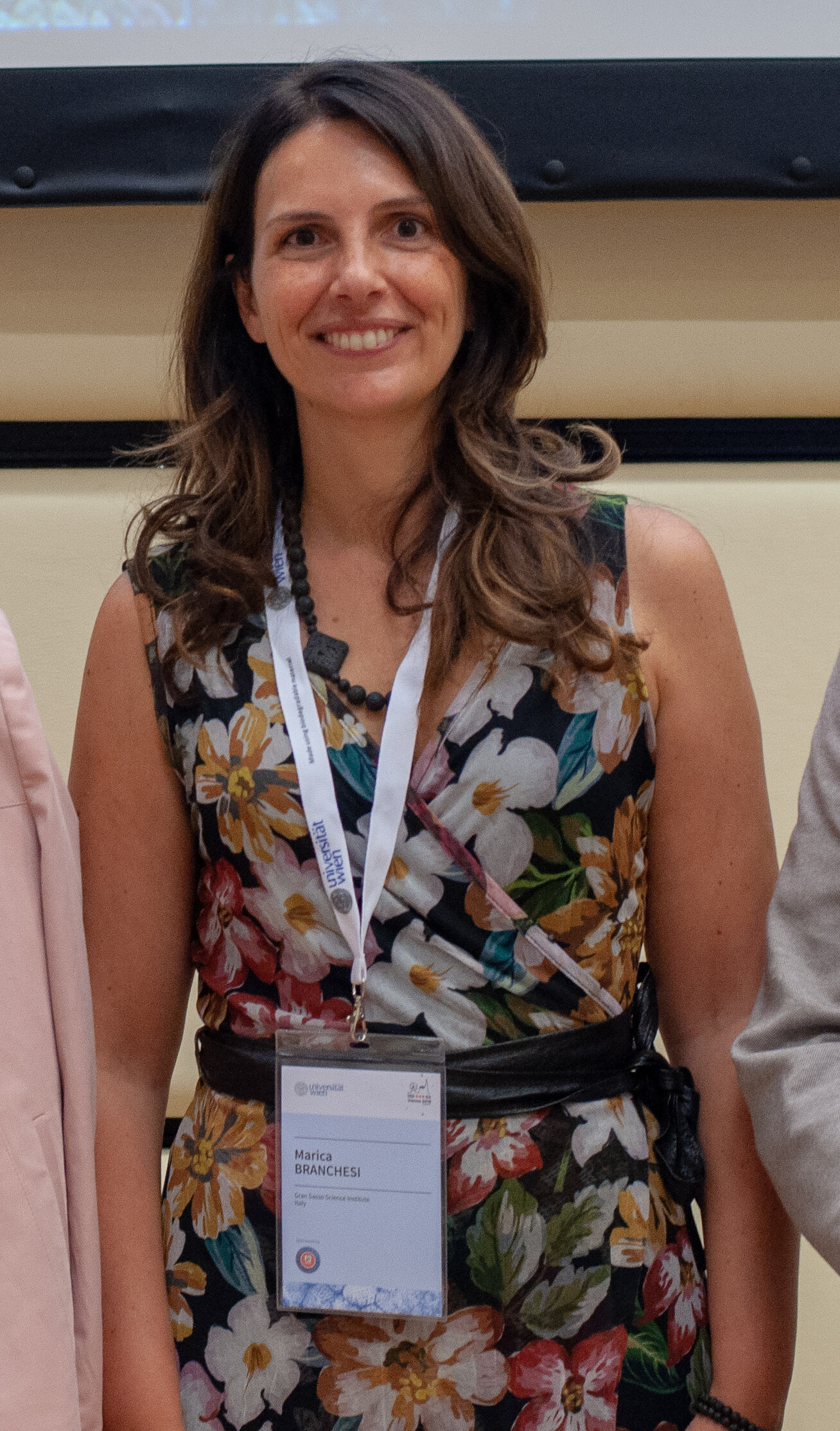
- Born: 7 March 1977; Urbino
- Occupation: Astrophysicist
- Awards: Nature's 10 (2, 2017); Time 100 (2018)
- Scientific career

Marica Branchesi (Urbino, March 7, 1977) is an Italian astrophysicist. Her leadership and scientific work was pivotal for Virgo/LIGO's discovery of gravitational waves. She is vice president of International Astronomical Union Gravitational Wave Astrophysics Commission and member of the Gravitational Wave International Committee.

== Education ==
Branchesi completed her undergraduate degree in astronomy in 2002, and obtained a Ph.D. from the University of Bologna in 2006, with a focus in radio astronomy, black holes and clusters of galaxies. She then moved to the California Institute of Technology, where she met her husband, Jan Harms, German physicist and gravitational waves expert.

== Research ==
After being awarded a grant by Italian Minister of Education in 2009, she decided to move back to Italy, where she built her own research staff at the University of Urbino. She is now an assistant professor at the Gran Sasso Science Institute, where she works as co-liaison to coordinate between LIGO's and Virgo's follow up of sending gravitational-wave alerts in low-latency. At LIGO/Virgo, she also studied gravitational waves physics and electromagnetic signals associated with gravitational signal sources.

Notably, she was named one of Nature's "Ten people who mattered this year" for her work as liaison between LIGO and Virgo in the gravitational wave collaboration. She served as a link between the physicists and astronomers, and encouraged both groups to take tentative detections more seriously and coordinated telescopes to follow up on events as soon as they were discovered.

Her current interests lie in understanding the nature of black holes and neutron stars, namely what governs their emission, formation and evolution. With her research, she aims to develop multi-messenger astronomy that uses electromagnetic and gravitational waves to probe the most energetic phenomena in the universe.

== Awards ==
- 2016 – Breakthrough Prize to Ligo/Virgo project for detection of gravitational waves 100 years after Albert Einstein predicted their existence.
- 2017 – "Ten people who mattered this year" of Nature.
- 2018 – "TIME 100 most influential people"
- 2026 – elected to Academia Europaea

== Works ==
- Branchesi, Marica; Collaboration, Ligo Scientific; Collaboration, Virgo (2012). "Electromagnetic follow-up of gravitational wave transient signal candidates". Journal of Physics: Conference Series. 375 (6) 062004. arXiv:1202.4421. Bibcode:2012JPhCS.375f2004B. doi:10.1088/1742-6596/375/1/062004. ISSN 1742-6596. S2CID 119114529.
- Ziosi, Brunetto Marco; Mapelli, Michela; Branchesi, Marica; Tormen, Giuseppe (2014-07-11). "Dynamics of stellar black holes in young star clusters with different metallicities – II. Black hole–black hole binaries". Monthly Notices of the Royal Astronomical Society. 441 (4): 3703–3717. arXiv:1404.7147. Bibcode:2014MNRAS.441.3703Z. doi:10.1093/mnras/stu824. ISSN 0035-8711.
- Patricelli, B.; Razzano, M.; Cella, G.; Fidecaro, F.; Pian, E.; Branchesi, M.; Stamerra, A. (2016). "Prospects for joint observations of gravitational waves and gamma rays from merging neutron star binaries". Journal of Cosmology and Astroparticle Physics. 2016 (11): 056. arXiv:1606.06124. Bibcode:2016JCAP...11..056P. doi:10.1088/1475-7516/2016/11/056. ISSN 1475-7516. S2CID 119205530.
- Abbott, B. P.; Abbott, R.; Abbott, T. D.; Abernathy, M. R.; Acernese, F.; Ackley, K.; Adams, C.; Adams, T.; Addesso, P. (2016-02-11). "Observation of Gravitational Waves from a Binary Black Hole Merger". Physical Review Letters. 116 (6) 061102. arXiv:1602.03837. Bibcode:2016PhRvL.116f1102A. doi:10.1103/physrevlett.116.061102. ISSN 0031-9007. PMID 26918975. S2CID 119286014.
- Branchesi, Marica (2016). "Multi-messenger astronomy: gravitational waves, neutrinos, photons, and cosmic rays". Journal of Physics: Conference Series. 718 (2) 022004. Bibcode:2016JPhCS.718b2004B. doi:10.1088/1742-6596/718/2/022004. ISSN 1742-6596.

== See also ==
- Women in science
- Multi-messenger astronomy
