= Nenad Sestan =

American professor and researcher

Nenad Šestan (born 1970 in Zadar, Croatia) is Harvey and Kate Cushing Professor of Neuroscience and professor of comparative medicine, genetics and psychiatry at the Yale School of Medicine. He received his MD from the School of Medicine, University of Zagreb in 1995 and his PhD from Yale School of Medicine in 1999.

Šestan and his research were profiled in The New York Times in July 2019. In 2019, he appeared in Nature's 10, a yearly list of "ten people who mattered in science" compiled by the scientific journal Nature. Šestan is a member of HAZU.
