= Jane Rigby =

American astrophysicist

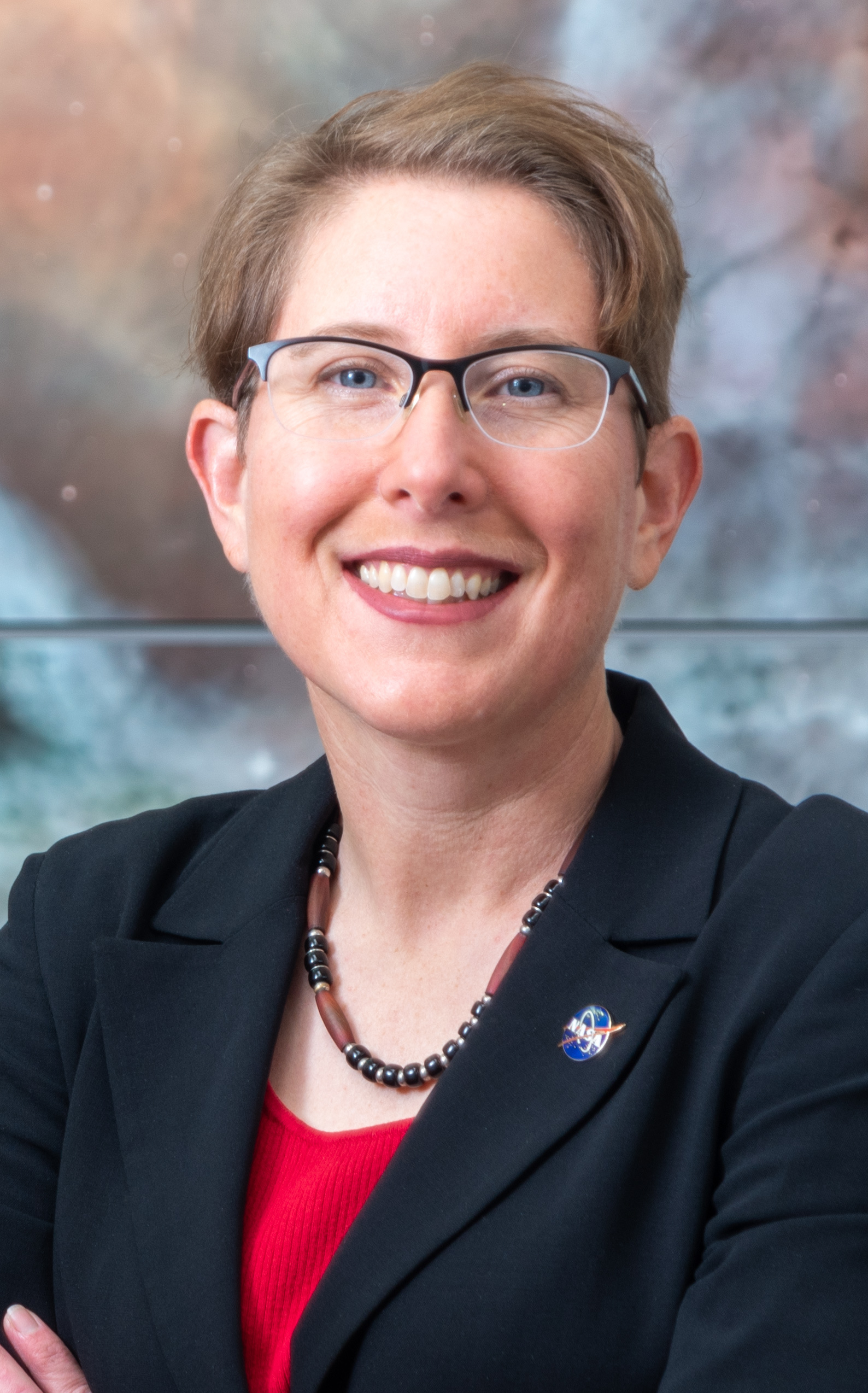
- Rigby in 2023
- Born: Seaford, Delaware, United States
- Education: Pennsylvania State University (BS, 2000); University of Arizona (MS, 2003; PhD, 2006)
- Known for: James Webb Space Telescope
- Spouse: Andrea Leistra (m. 2009; died 2025)
- Children: 1
- Awards: Presidential Medal of Freedom (2024)
- Scientific career
- Workplaces: Goddard Space Flight Center
- Doctoral advisor: George H. Rieke

Jane R. Rigby is an American astrophysicist who works at NASA's Goddard Space Flight Center (GSFC) as Senior Project Scientist of the James Webb Space Telescope (JWST). She has frequently made public appearances and is known for her association with the telescope. She has also worked to support inclusivity in science. In 2024, she was awarded the Presidential Medal of Freedom by President Joe Biden.

Originally from Seaford, Delaware, Rigby received a bachelor's degree from Pennsylvania State University, followed by a master's degree and PhD from the University of Arizona. In 2010, Rigby joined GSFC as the deputy operations project scientist of the planned JWST, which had been facing cost and schedule issues. She became the operations project scientist in 2018, which involved assessing the success of the telescope after its 2021 launch. She was involved in the publication of its first results and the release of its first images. In 2023, she succeeded John C. Mather as the telescope's senior project scientist.

== Education and personal life ==
Jane Rigby was born and raised in Seaford, Delaware. Both of her parents were teachers, and she has one sister. As a preschooler, her favorite television show was Cosmos, hosted by astronomer Carl Sagan. After attending a talk by Sally Ride, when she was about twelve years old, she wanted to become an astronaut, and she participated in Space Camp in Huntsville. However, her height was below the requirements for the Space Shuttle program, so she instead chose to pursue astronomy. She graduated from Seaford High School in 1996.

Rigby was an undergraduate student at Pennsylvania State University. She was advised by Jane Charlton, who brought her to the first telescope she worked with, at the McDonald Observatory in Texas. She gained a research interest in the growth of galaxies with supermassive black holes. She received bachelor degrees in physics and astronomy in 2000, completing an undergraduate dissertation on Magnesium II emission systems.

Rigby moved to the University of Arizona for graduate studies in 2000, where she was a National Science Foundation Graduate Research Fellow and received a master's degree in 2003. She received a PhD from the same institution in 2006, under the supervision of George H. Rieke. Rigby was then appointed as a postdoctoral fellow at the Carnegie Observatories in California.

Rigby came out as lesbian in 2000. When she joined the University of Arizona, homosexuality was against state law.

There, she met another graduate student in astronomy, Andrea Leistra, whom she married in 2009. Rigby has also participated in LGBTQ rights activism; during her postdoctoral work, she campaigned against the 2008 California Proposition 8, which would have banned same-sex marriage. Rigby and Leistra had a son, born in 2013 or 2014. Leistra died in 2025.

== Career ==
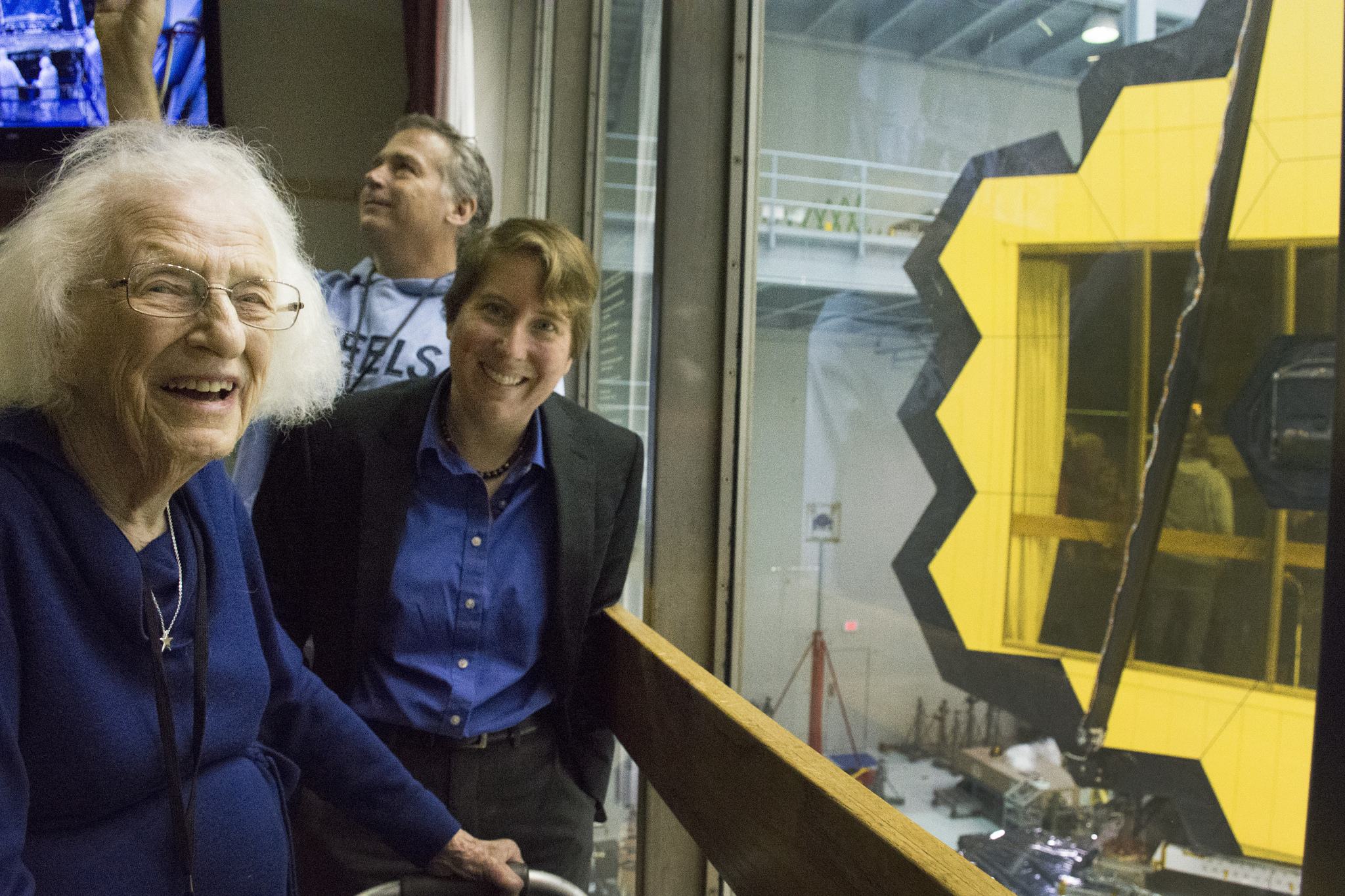
Nancy Grace Roman with Jane Rigby and the James Webb Space Telescope

Rigby has authored over 150 papers. She has worked with telescopes including the Keck Observatory and Magellan Telescopes, as well as the Hubble, Spitzer, and Chandra space telescopes.

=== James Webb Space Telescope ===
In 2010, Rigby was appointed as a civil servant at Goddard Space Flight Center, located in Greenbelt, Maryland, where she was named as the deputy operations project scientist at the James Webb Space Telescope (JWST). Upon taking the job, she read a third-party report on the telescope's delays and budget overruns. Rigby's job involved reinstating features that had been cut due to cost, ensuring the feasibility of design changes, and communicating between scientists and engineers.

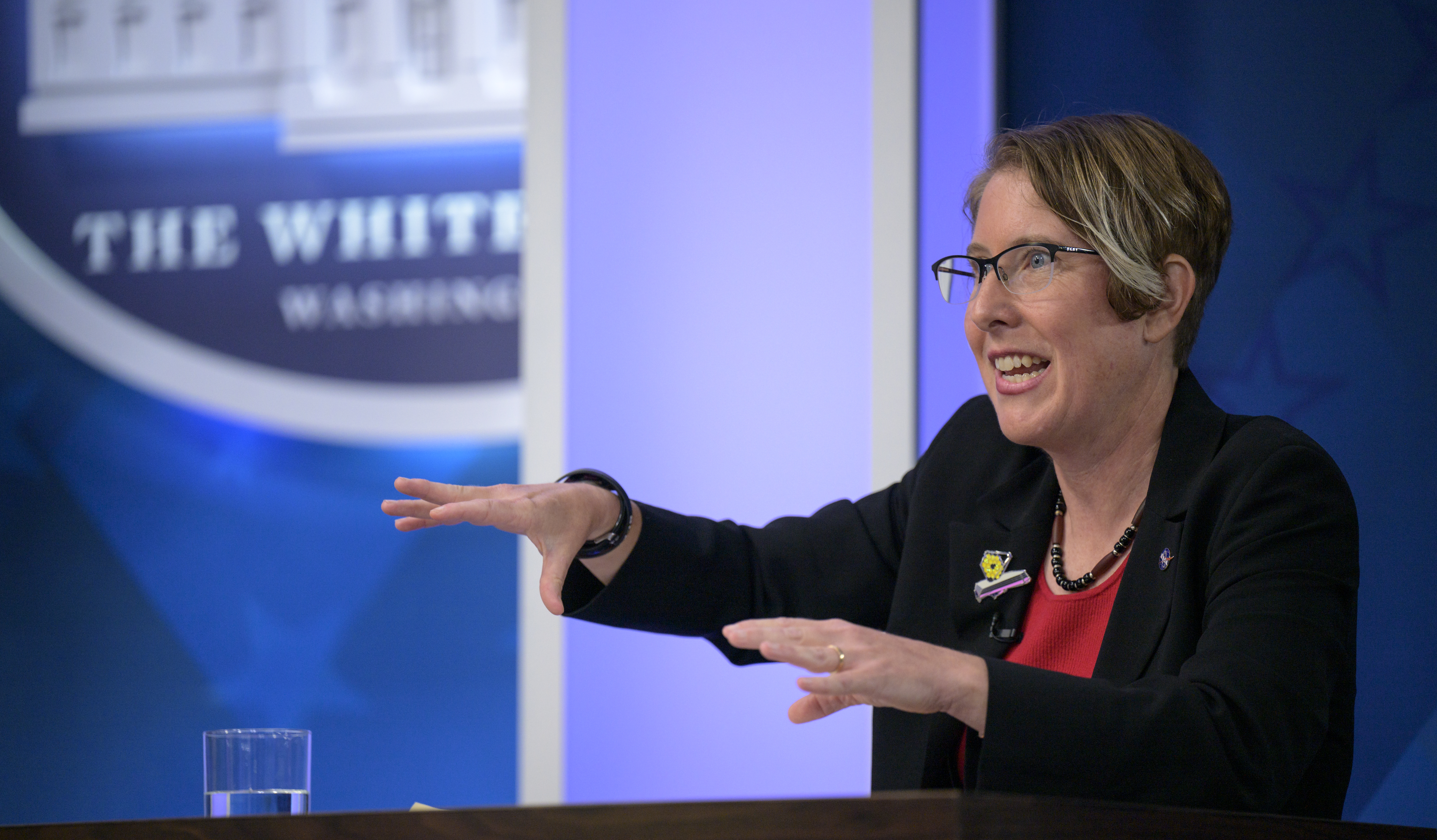
Rigby at the White House during the 2022 presentation of JWST's first images

Rigby was made JWST's project scientist for operations in 2018. In the five months after it launched on December 25, 2021, her job was to assess the performance of the telescope, such as the amount of light leak that could obscure the data. The telescope exceeded its performance metrics, including having very little light leak. Rigby and her team were the first people to observe data from JWST, after which they used infrared data to generate a deep field image of space in the distant past. In July 2022, she published the first paper about these results, and on July 11, she appeared at the White House, alongside President Joe Biden and Vice President Kamala Harris, for the unveiling of JWST's first images.

In the first year of JWST's operation, Rigby led a project researching star formation in distant galaxies whose gravitationally lensed light was not visible to any telescope before it. Rigby is also responsible for TEMPLATES (Targeting Extremely Magnified Panchromatic Lensed Arcs and Their Extended Star Formation), a project that images gravitationally lensed galaxies. She announced this project's discovery of hydrocarbons in a galaxy over twelve billion light years away in June 2023. The same month, Rigby was chosen as the senior project scientist for JWST, succeeding John C. Mather. In this position, she managed the scientific goals of the telescope.

President Biden awarded Rigby with the Presidential Medal of Freedom on May 3, 2024, in recognition of her work on JWST and support for inclusivity in science. In her acceptance speech, Rigby expressed gratitude for Ride as well as gay rights activists Harvey Milk and Bayard Rustin, all of whom were previous honorees of the award. In her hometown, the Seaford Museum planned an exhibit about JWST for the following summer.

=== Outreach and work for inclusivity ===
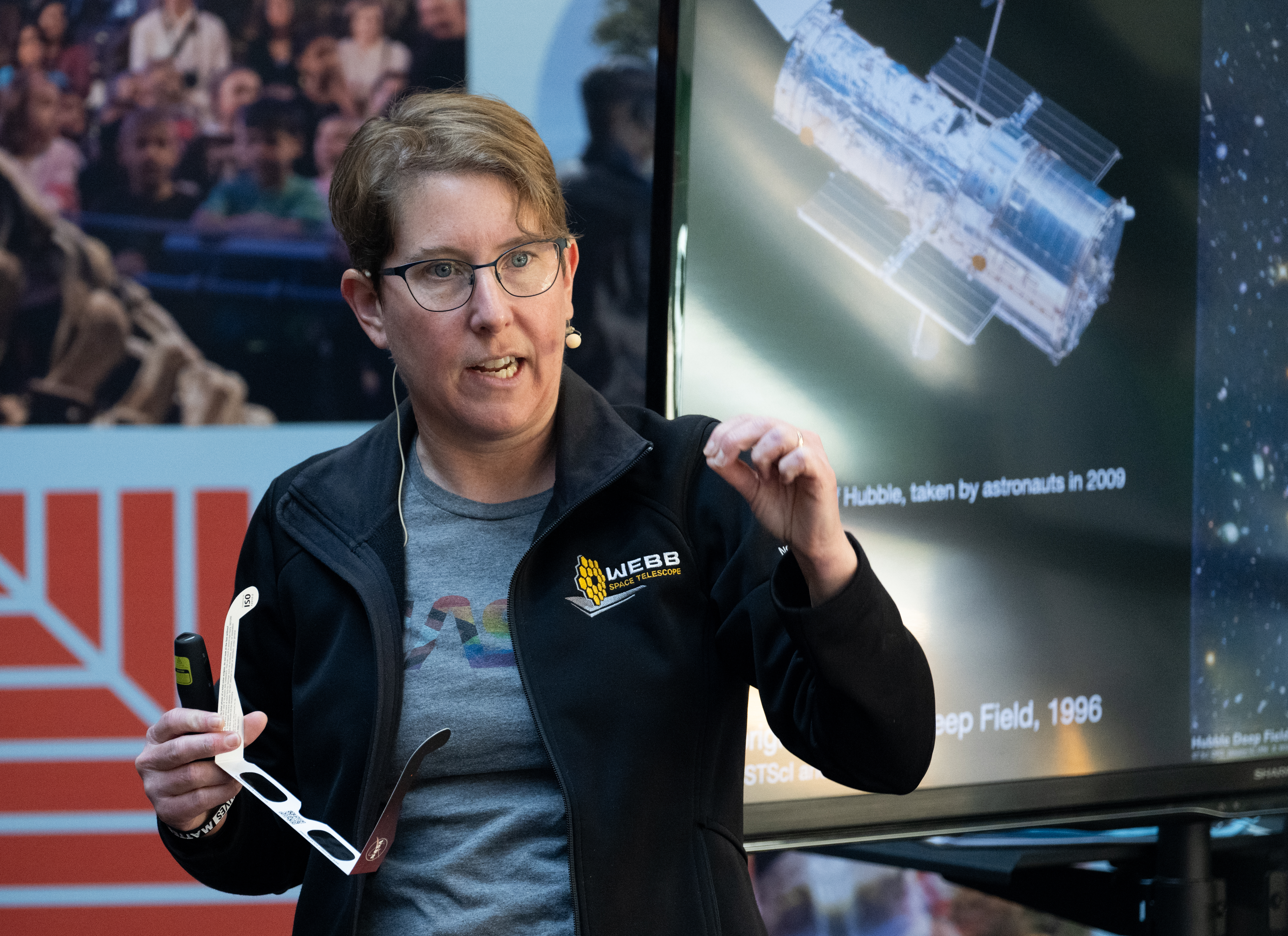
Rigby speaking at the Children's Museum of Indianapolis in 2024

Rigby has worked to engage the public with science. She has frequently made public appearances wearing JWST-themed accessories. Writing for Science News, Lisa Grossman said, "Rigby's palpable joy in discussing the success of the JWST ... has made her one of the public faces of the telescope." Rigby spoke to the publication about her popularity, "I understand the desire to humanize something that can seem really big and impersonal. But I don’t like the singling out. I try to reflect it back to the team."

Rigby has worked on supporting inclusivity in the field, including co-organizing conferences and writing a white paper about the subject. Rigby was a founding member of the American Astronomical Society Committee for Sexual-Orientation and Gender Minorities in Astronomy (originally the Working Group on LGBTQ Equality) in January 2012, and later served as the committee's Board Liaison. Rigby has said that her experience as a queer person has made her a better astronomer by influencing her leadership skills and thoughts toward community impact.

== Awards and honors ==
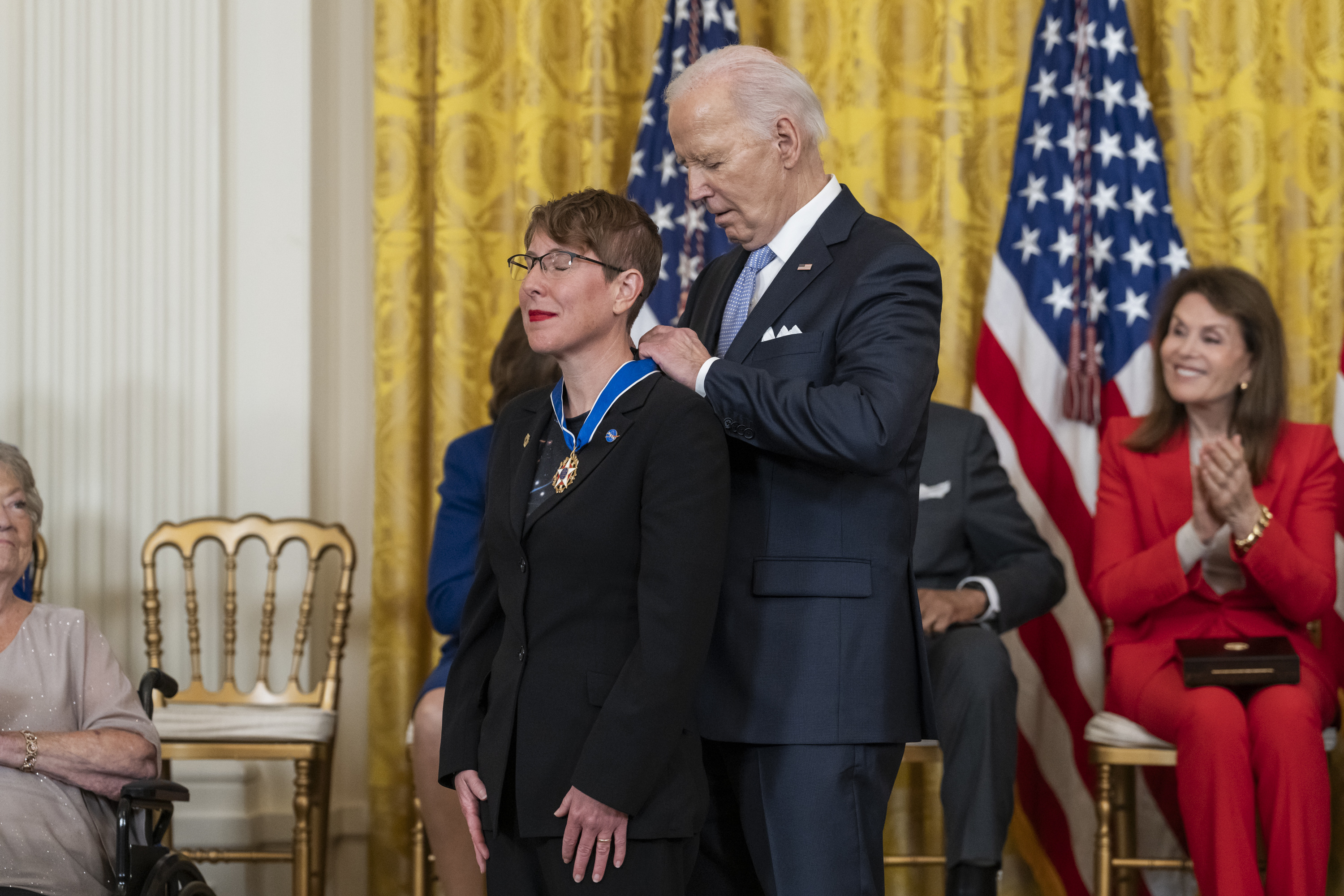
Rigby receiving the Presidential Medal of Freedom in 2024

- 2013 Eberly College of Science Outstanding Alumni Award
- 2013 NASA Robert H. Goddard Award for Exceptional Achievement for Science
- 2014 NASA Robert H. Goddard Award for Diversity and Equal Employment Opportunity
- 2018 John C. Lindsay Memorial Award for Space Science
- 2021 Nature's 10 Ones to Watch in 2022
- 2022 Out to Innovate LGBTQ+ Scientist of the Year
- 2022 BBC 100 Women
- 2022 Nature's 10
- 2023 AAS Fred Kavli Plenary Lecture
- 2024 Presidential Medal of Freedom
