= Cordelia Bähr =

Swiss lawyer (born 1980/1981)

Cordelia Bähr (born 1980 or 1981) is a Swiss lawyer best known for her lawsuits related to climate change. In 2024 she represented 2,500 elderly Swiss women in a case against their government, arguing that the state had a duty to protect its citizens from the impacts of climate change. That year, the European Court of Human Rights ruled in their favor. Afterwards, she was named to Nature's 10 list of people who mattered in science, and in 2025 she was named to the Time 100 list of most influential people.

She graduated from the University of Zurich in 2006 with a lic. iur. and from the London School of Economics in 2013 with an LL.M. in public law.

She is a partner in the law firm barh ettwein, based in Zurich.
