= Dimie Ogoina =

Nigerian infectious disease physician-scientist

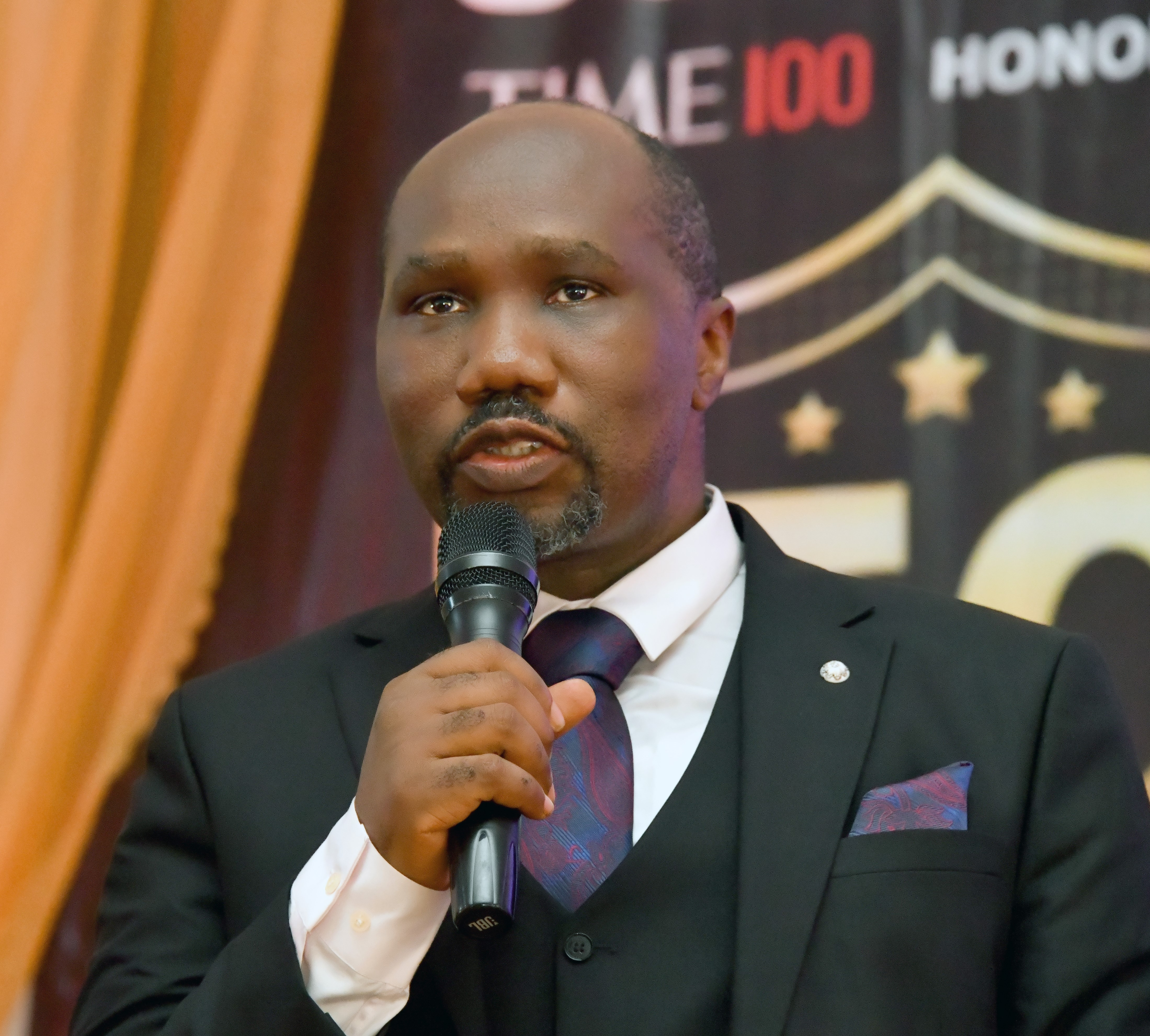
- Education: Ahmadu Bello University
- Scientific career
- Fields: Infectious diseases
- Workplaces: Niger Delta University

Dimie Ogoina is a Nigerian infectious disease physician-scientist. He is a professor of medicine at the Niger Delta University and chief medical director at its teaching hospital. He is president of the Nigerian Infectious Diseases Society. He was appointed the Vice Chancellor of Bayelsa Medical University in October 2024.

== Life ==
Ogoina attended high school in Lagos, Nigeria. He completed a Bachelor of Medicine, Bachelor of Surgery at Ahmadu Bello University where he studied under mentors Laszlo Egler and Geoffrey Onyemelukwe.

After his residency, Ogoina worked as a lecturer and consultant physician at the HIV/AIDS clinic at Bingham University Teaching Hospital in Jos. He then joined Niger Delta University (NDU) and the NDU Teaching Hospital where he has served in several roles including head of department, provost of the college of medicine, chair of the medical advisory committee, and chief medical director. He is a professor of medicine. Ogoina researches HIV/AIDS and antimicrobial resistance. In 2017, he presented on Mpox in Nigeria. As of 2023, he is the current president of the Nigerian Infectious Diseases Society. In April 2023, Ogoina was named to the Time 100 list of the most influential people in the world for his scientific contributions and global health equity efforts.
