= Yifat Merbl =

Israeli immunologist

Yifat Merbl (Hebrew: יפעת מרבל) is a professor of immunology at the Weizmann Institute of Science. Her research is at the intersection of biochemistry, proteomics, and immunology, and addresses research questions in the fields of cancer and the immune system.

== Biography ==
Marbel grew up in Givat Shmuel. In her compulsory service in the IDF, she served as an officer in the Air Force.

In 2003, she received BA in computational biology from Bar-Ilan University. In 2005, she received MA in immunology from the Weizmann Institute of Science as part of Irun R. Cohen's group from the Department of Immunology. In 2010, she received a PhD in systems biology from Harvard University under the supervision of Mark Kirschner. In 2011–2014, she continued her postdoctoral research at Harvard University. In September 2014, she returned to Israel, as head of a research group at the Weizmann Institute of Science studying the proteasome.

In parallel with her work at the Weizmann Institute of Science, as of May 2024 she is one of the three founders of the startup company Promise Bio Ltd., which uses a cloud-based artificial intelligence platform to perform large-scale epiproteomic analyses on standard mass spectrometry data to improve disease treatment.

During the Twelve-Day War, her Weizmann Institute laboratory was destroyed by a ballistic missile launched from Iran.

=== Personal life ===
Her wife is Einav Lazar, and they have three children.

== Research ==
Her research is at the intersection of biochemistry, proteomics, and immunology, and addresses research questions in the field of cancer and the immune system.

A study she led found that the proteasome can break down proteins into peptides that are effective against bacteria. This is an immune mechanism that was unknown until this study. The team of researchers working under her found more than a quarter of a million peptides with the potential for an antibacterial effect. These peptides may in the future form the basis for new drugs with a different mechanism of action than antibiotics. The study was published in early March 2025 in the journal Nature.

== Awards and recognition ==
In 2024, she was awarded the Rappaport Prize for Promising Researcher.

In 2025, the scientific journal Nature selected her as one of the ten most significant and groundbreaking researchers of 2025.
