= Wendy Rogers (academic) =

Australian bioethicist (born 1957)

Wendy Rogers FAHA
- Born: Wendy Anne Rogers; 1957 (age 68–69)
- Education: Flinders University (PhD)
- Awards: Nature's 10 (2019)
- Scientific career
- Fields: Ethics; Bioethics; Medical ethics Artificial intelligence in healthcare
- Workplaces: Macquarie University
- Thesis: The moral landscape of general practice (1998)
- Website: researchers.mq.edu.au/en/persons/wendy-rogers

Wendy Anne Rogers FAHA (born 1957) is an Australian bioethicist. She is currently professor of clinical ethics at Macquarie University in Sydney, Australia. She was named one of Nature's 10 people who mattered in 2019 for revealing ethical failures in China's studies on organ transplantation.

== Education ==
Rogers was educated at Flinders University where she was awarded a PhD in 1998 on morality in general practice.

== Career and research ==
Rogers works on practical bioethics and overdiagnosis. She has interests in medical ethics, artificial intelligence in healthcare and ethics in surgery.

== Awards ==
Rogers was named one of Nature's 10 people who mattered in 2019 for revealing ethical failures in China's studies on organ transplantation. Nature cited her report in BMJ Open, which analyzed 445 Chinese studies which described >85,000 individual transplants, and found that 99% did not adequately prove consent for the transplantation procedure. In 2019, she received the ethics award from the National Health and Medical Research Council and was named the national research leader in the field of bioethics by The Australian. She was elected a Fellow of the Australian Academy of the Humanities in 2021.
