= M. Maria Glymour =

American epidemiologist

- Born: Latimer County, Oklahoma, US

Academic background
- Education: AB, biology, 1996, University of Chicago; SM, SD, 2004, Harvard T.H. Chan School of Public Health

Medellena Maria Lee Glymour is an American epidemiologist. Her primary research interests focus on "how social factors experienced across the lifecourse, such as educational attainment and work environment, influence cognitive function, memory loss, stroke and other health outcomes in old age."

== Early life and education ==
Glymour was raised in Latimer County, Oklahoma. Following high school, she enrolled at the University of Chicago for a Bachelor of Science degree in Biology. She described her time in Chicago as being "difficult to harrowing, although that alternated with the thrill of being there." Glymour completed her Master of Science and Doctor of Science degree at the Harvard T.H. Chan School of Public Health.

== Career ==
Upon completing her Master's and Doctoral degree, Glymour became a Robert Wood Johnson Foundation Health & Society Scholar in Social Epidemiology and subsequently joined the faculty at Harvard University. Her primary research interests focus on "how social factors experienced across the lifecourse, such as educational attainment and work environment, influence cognitive function, memory loss, stroke and other health outcomes in old age." In 2008, Glymour published an article in the American Journal of Public Health which found that elderly Americans who have an active social life may have a slower rate of memory decline. She was also the first author for an article titled "Spousal Smoking and Incidence of First Stroke: The Health and Retirement Study," which found that when one partner smokes, it leads to increased stroke risk for their spouse. In 2009, Glymour and her research team analyzed census data and mortality records regarding stroke deaths from 1980, 1990 and 2000 across the United States and concluded that geographic risk factors in childhood were the likely culprit for higher stroke mortality in certain regions.

In 2014, Glymour co-published "Short- and long-term associations between widowhood and mortality in the United States: longitudinal analyses," which was a population sample study that suggested rates of death nearly double during the first three months after the loss of a spouse, and quickly taper thereafter. She also led another study on the Widowhood effect which found that spousal health starts to decline prior to the death of their partner. The following year, Glymour, Erika L. Sabbath, Iván Mejía-Guevara, and Lisa F. Berkman earned the Kalish Award from the Gerontological Society of America in the article category for "Use of Life Course Work-Family Profiles to Predict Mortality Risk among U.S. Women." She also analyzed health information from 16,178 men and women ages 50 and older to conclude that those who have persistent symptoms of depression over the age of 50 may have twice the risk of stroke as those who do not.

As a professor of Epidemiology and Biostatistics at the University of California, San Francisco, Glymour led the PhD program in Epidemiology and Translational Science. She continued to conduct research on lifecourse social factors and late life health. Work with colleagues concluded that the longer a child remains in school, the higher their reduced risk for heart disease and improvements in several cardiovascular risk factors in adulthood becomes. During the COVID-19 pandemic in North America, Glymour collaborated on a study which found that California's lockdown suppressed excess COVID-19 related deaths.
