= Zhang Rongqiao =

Chinese physicist and aerospace engineer

- 张荣桥
- Born: March 1966 (age 60); Qimen, Anhui, China
- Education: Xidian University; China Academy of Space Technology; Tsinghua University
- Scientific career
- Fields: Electromagnetic field Microwave technology
- Workplaces: Lunar Exploration Center of the Commission for Science, Technology and Industry for National Defense

Chinese name
- Simplified Chinese: 张荣桥
- Traditional Chinese: 張榮橋
Transcriptions
Standard Mandarin
- Hanyu Pinyin: Zhāng Róngqiáo

Zhang Rongqiao (Chinese: 张荣桥; born March 1966) is a Chinese physicist and aerospace engineer who is the chief designer of Tianwen-1, China's first mission to Mars.

== Biography ==
Zhang was born in the town of Anling, Qimen County, Huangshan, Anhui province in March 1966. He secondary studied at Qimen No.1 High School. In 1984, he was accepted to Xidian University and graduated with a bachelor's degree in 1988. In 1991, he graduated from China Academy of Space Technology with a Master of Engineering. He received his EMBA degree from Tsinghua University School of Economics and Management in 2002.

Zhang joined the Beijing Institute of Satellite Information Engineering. In 2004, he was transferred to the Lunar Exploration Center of the Commission for Science, Technology and Industry for National Defense, where he serves as the chief designer of Tianwen-1, China's first Mars probe. On May 30, 2021, he was elected as a member of the Standing Committee of the China Association for Science and Technology.

Zhang was included in a list of ten scientists who had had important roles in scientific developments in 2021 compiled by the scientific journal Nature.

In October 2022, Zhang was elected as an alternate member of the Central Committee of the Chinese Communist Party on the 20th Party Congress.

In 2023, Zhang was elected as an academician to the Chinese Academy of Sciences.
