= Out in Science, Technology, Engineering, and Mathematics =

oSTEM, Inc.
- Out in Science, Technology, Engineering, and Mathematics, Incorporated
- Formation: 2005
- Type: Nonprofit
- Headquarters: Michigan, USA
- Region served: International
- Executive Director and CEO: Lilian Martinez
- Interim President: Avery Cunningham
- Subsidiaries: Queer in AI
- Staff: 2
- Volunteers: 90
- Website: https://www.ostem.org/

Out in Science, Technology, Engineering, and Mathematics, Inc., abbreviated oSTEM, is a 501(c)(3) non-profit professional society dedicated to LGBTQ+ individuals within the science, technology, engineering, and mathematics (STEM) community.

== History ==
In October of 2005. IBM sponsored a focus group where students from across the United States convened at the Human Rights Campaign headquarters in Washington, D.C. These students discussed topics relevant to LGBTQ+ communities at their colleges and universities. They debated how to structure an organization that serves students in science, technology, engineering, and mathematics.

Founded in 2009, the organization was granted 501(c)(3) status in 2010. oSTEM currently consists of more than 100 chapters across the United States and the United Kingdom.

== Mission ==
oSTEM strives to identify, address, and advocate for the needs of LGBTQ+ students and professionals within the STEM fields. oSTEM fulfills these needs by providing networking opportunities, mentorship connections, strategic collaborations, and professional/leadership development, as well as an annual global conference.

== Activities ==
=== Conferences ===
oSTEM hosts annual conferences that discuss LGBTQ+ topics in STEM as well as intelligence fields. Topics discussed include inclusion, outreach, and diversity within the workplace. The goal of workshops, talks, and networking events for LGBTQ+ people is to help them integrate and move up in their fields. The fourth annual conference was hosted jointly with the National Organization of Gay and Lesbian Scientists and Technical Professionals' Out to Innovate in Atlanta in 2014.

=== LGBT STEM Day ===
On July 5, 2018, oSTEM along with Pride in STEM, House of STEM, and InterEngineering created international awareness for LGBTQ+ people in science, technology, engineering, and mathematics.

== Awards ==
oSTEM presents a variety of awards annually to individuals and organizations that demonstrate a strong dedication to advancing and empowering LGBTQ+ in STEM fields.

=== oSTEM Volunteer of the Year Award ===
According to the oSTEM website, "This award recognizes volunteers who have gone above and beyond to bring oSTEM to new heights in the last year. The Executive Board recognizes volunteers who have demonstrated their drive to achieve great things and push our organization to grow. In the past, awardees have been recognized for creating our scholarship program, spearheading the pivot to an online format for our cornerstone event during COVID, cultivating and expanding institutional support for professional members and collegiate members, and stepping into leadership roles with grace and professionalism. oSTEM is powered by the hard work and commitment of our volunteers."

Previous awardees include:

- Janine van Niekerk (2017)
- Lilian Martinez and Sindhu Sreedhar (2018)
- Christian Alonso (2019)
- AJ Bryant (2020)
- Abby Ray (2021)
- M Wittkop (2022)
- Zia Bresnahan (2023)
- Ace Harris (2024)
- Erin Bryant-Ross (2025)

=== oSTEM Global STEM Service Award ===
This award is presented to an active member, alumnus/a, chapter mentor, or organization leader of oSTEM who has demonstrated dedication towards oSTEM, LGBTQ+ people in STEM, and STEM education..

Awardees are:

- Avery Cunningham (2019)
- Cel Welsh (2020)
- Lee Trent (2021)
- Angie Gonzalez (2022)

=== oSTEM Strategic Alliance Award ===
This award is presented to a current sponsoring organization, community partner, or grant provider of oSTEM who has demonstrated a strong dedication to oSTEM, LGBTQ+ people in STEM, and STEM education. They are recognized leaders in LGBTQ+ workplace or institutional inclusion. They consistently support oSTEM, Inc. and regularly engage with and support oSTEM chapters. They are committed to and continually strive to understand the most effective methods for reaching equality for all people.

Awardees are:

- Alcoa (2015)
- US Intelligence Community (IC Pride) (2016)
- Accenture (2017)
- Boeing (2018)
- Ford Motor Company (2019)
- Lockheed Martin (2020)
- Raytheon (2021)
- Ansys (2022)

=== oSTEM Partner Excellence Award ===
This award is presented to an individual representative of a current sponsoring organization, community partner, or grant provider of oSTEM that has demonstrated a strong dedication to oSTEM, LGBTQ+ people in STEM, and STEM education. They are an outstanding role models for the oSTEM community, accomplished in their academic or professional lives, and they regularly advocate for the full inclusion of people of all marginalized identities.

Awardees are:

- Gib Murray - Raytheon (2015)
- Wolfgang Sigmund - University of Florida (2016)
- Steve Riley - NASA (2017)
- Lianna Newman - ConsenSys/Out in Tech (2018)
- Beau Williams - Boeing (2019)
- Stuart Duncan - University of Connecticut (2021)
- Casady Wyckoff - Boeing (2022)

=== Chapter of the Year ===
This award recognizes the ongoing accomplishments of established oSTEM Chapters. The guiding purpose of the oSTEM organization is to empower LGBTQ+ people in STEM to succeed personally, academically, and professionally by cultivating environments and communities that nurture innovation, leadership, and advocacy. Past awardees include:

- oSTEM at University of Kansas (2016)
- oSTEM at New York University (2017)
- oSTEM at Colorado School of Mines (2018)
- oSTEM at UC San Diego (2019)

=== Rookie Chapter of the Year ===
This award celebrates the achievements made by those chapters. The first years of any student organization can be difficult.

Awardees are:

- oSTEM at University of Michigan (2016)
- oSTEM at University of Minnesota (2017)
- oSTEM at University of Arkansas (2018)
- oSTEM at Howard University (2019)

== Chapters ==
There are over 100 chapters affiliated with the parent organization. Chapters are organized into six geographic regions (A–F) and a region that encompasses all chapters dedicated specifically to graduate students.

=== Student Chapters ===
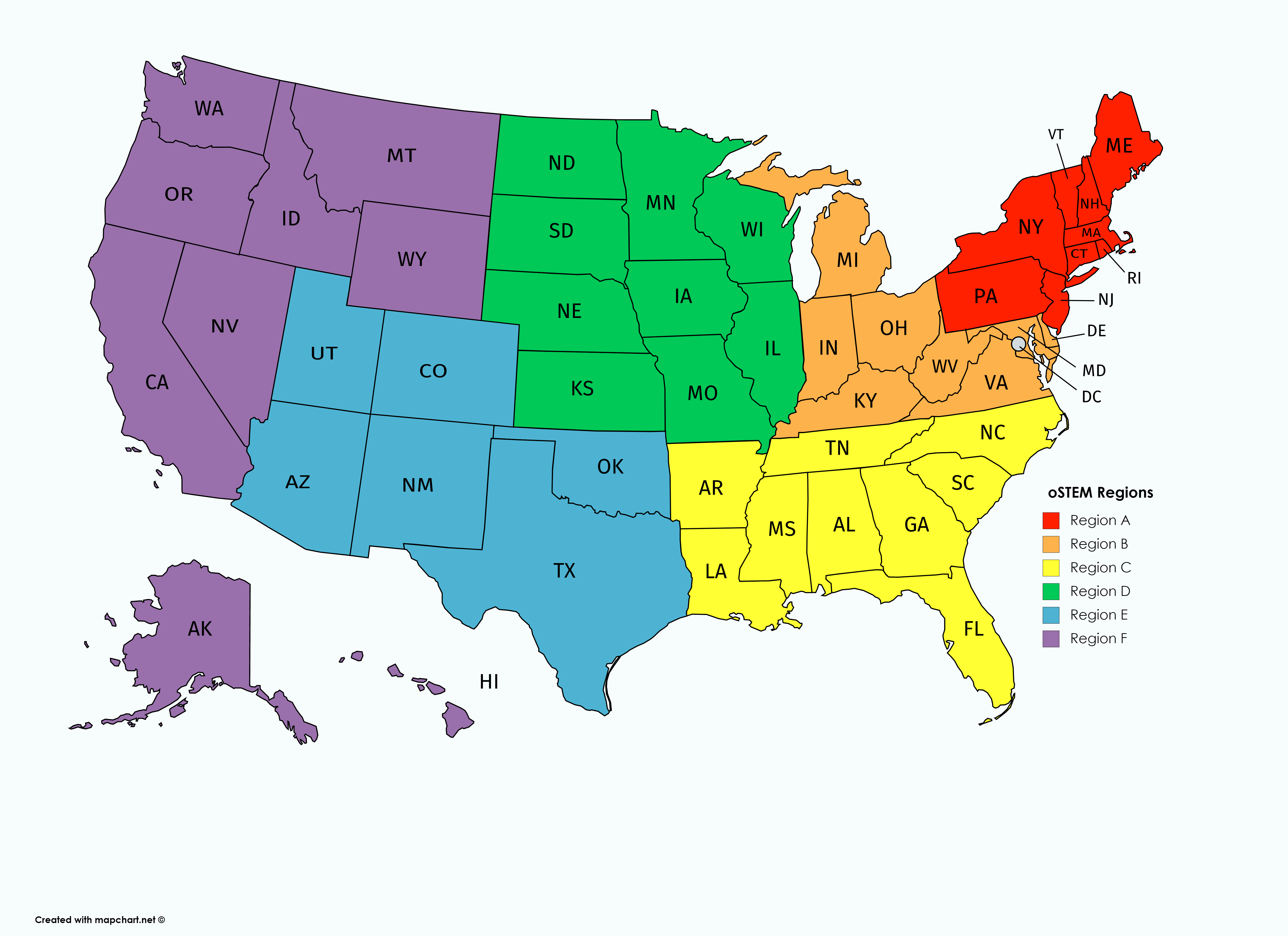
Map of the oSTEM (Out in Science, Technology, Engineering, and Mathematics) Regions in the United States.

The six regions are:

- Region A
  - New Jersey, New York (state), Pennsylvania
- Region B
  - Delaware, Indiana, Kentucky, Maryland, Michigan, Ohio, Virginia, Washington, D.C., West Virginia
- Region C
  - Alabama, Arkansas, Florida, Georgia (U.S. state), Louisiana, Mississippi, North Carolina, South Carolina, Tennessee
- Region D
  - Illinois, Iowa, Kansas, Minnesota, Missouri, Nebraska, North Dakota, South Dakota, Wisconsin
- Region E
  - Colorado, Montana, New Mexico, Oklahoma, Texas, Utah, Wyoming
- Region F
  - Alaska, Arizona, California, Hawaii, Idaho, Nevada, Oregon, Washington (state)
- Region G
  - Connecticut, Maine, Massachusetts, New Hampshire, Rhode Island, Vermont, Toronto, United Kingdom
- Grad region
  - All graduate student chapters, regardless of geographic location

=== Professional Chapters ===
Professional chapters are currently being tested. Given that the organization was founded for students, it is not yet certain that professionals will find a "good fit" within oSTEM.

== See also ==
- List of LGBT-related organizations and conferences
- List of LGBT events
