= Masayo Takahashi =

Japanese medical physician, ophthalmologist and stem cell researcher

- Born: June 23, 1961 (age 65); Osaka, Japan
- Education: Kyoto University
- Known for: Clinical application of Induced pluripotent stem cell research
- Scientific career
- Fields: Stem cell research Ophthalmology
- Workplaces: Riken Institute; Kyoto University; Salk Institute

Masayo Takahashi (高橋 政代, Takahashi Masayo; born June 23, 1961) is a Japanese medical physician, ophthalmologist and stem cell researcher.

Takahashi serves as a project research leader at the Riken Center for Developmental Biology in Kobe focusing on the clinical application of iPS Cell (induced Pluripotent Stem Cell) technology on macular degeneration. In 2014, Takahashi was named by British science journal Nature as one of "five to watch" global scientists for her groundbreaking work in regenerative medicine.

In March 2017 a team led by Takahashi completed the first successful transplant of iPS-derived retinal cells into the eye of a patient suffering from advanced wet age-related macular degeneration. During the surgery the patient received a transplant of approximately 250,000 retinal pigment epithelial cells into the eye generated from donor-derived iPSCs. Results of this landmark study were published in the New England Journal of Medicine.

== Education ==
Takahashi was born in Osaka Japan in 1961. After graduating from the Faculty of Medicine at Kyoto University in 1986 and obtaining a PhD specializing in visual pathology at the same university in 1992, Takahashi's clinical and research work has focused on ophthalmology and retinal diseases. She chose ophthalmology as her specialty because she wanted to have a family and thought the discipline would help her best balance work and life. In 1995 Takahashi commenced post-doctoral research at the Salk Institute's Laboratory of Genetics. There she was fascinated by the chances of using stem cells for eye diseases and retinal therapy. Since 2001 she has served as an associate professor at the translational research center.

== Research ==
In September 2014, her and her team at the Riken Institute’s center for developmental biology in Kobe succeeded in a world-first transplanting of cells made from induced pluripotent stem cells into a human body. The operation was conducted as a clinical study and involved creating a retinal sheet from iPS cells, which were developed by Shinya Yamanaka. iPS cells are created by removing mature cells from an individual and reprogramming these cells back to an embryonic state. The retinal sheet was transplanted into a female patient in her 70s with age related macular degeneration (AMD), an eye complication that blurs the central field of vision and can progress into blindness. The iPS cells were hoped to stop the progression of AMD. Her and her research team used iPS cells made from the patient’s own skin cells. Then in March she and her team carried out the world’s first transplant of retinal cells created from donor iPS cells. Time and cost used in the surgery has been significantly reduced by using super donor cells, cells derived from people with special white blood cell types that aren’t rejected by the immune systems of receiving patients.

== Awards and honors ==
In 2015, Takahashi was awarded the Ogawa-Yamanaka Prize in Stem Cell Biology. Nature Magazine named her as one of five “scientists to watch in 2014” and nominated her as one of ten “people who mattered in 2014.” In 2016 and 2017, Takahashi became a laureate of the Asian Scientist 100 by the Asian Scientist.

== Further prospects ==
Many challenges remain however to advance the technology and make it commercially available. One of the issues is the high cost and it is estimated that could take until around 2019 before the cost of the IPS treatment for AMD will is below ¥10 million ($95,500) The procedure is expected to set the path for more applications of IPS-cell technology, which offers the versatility of embryonic cells without their ethical talent. The future of IPSC therapy looks promising and regenerative medicine will likely become a big field in the future. IPSCs and ESCs have the potential to industrialize the cell therapy field because they can be expanded so that more cells can be made for many patients. Also photoreceptor transplantation along with IPS derived cells is to be expected within five years which should not only slow AMD but could possibly even restore some vision. In addition, the effect of regenerative medicine will not depend on the donors cells but depend on the host condition and the surgery skill.
