= Svitlana Krakovska =

Ukrainian climate scientist

- Born: Kyiv, Ukraine
- Education: Leningrad Hydrometeorological Institute
- Occupation: climatologist

Svitlana Krakovska (Ukrainian: Світлана Краковська) is a Ukrainian climate scientist and head of the Ukrainian delegation to the Intergovernmental Panel on Climate Change (IPCC). She is an applied climatologist who introduced climate models to Ukraine.

== Biography ==
She graduated from the Leningrad Hydrometeorological Institute with a degree in meteorology. Prior to joining the Antarctic station, she was in Siberia and the Arctic.

She has experience in mountaineering in the mountains of the Caucasus and Central Asia, Crimea and Karelia, skiing in the Khibiny Mountains, kayaking and catamaran rafting, and as a student she did a hydrographic vessel practice from Petropavlovsk-Kamchatsky around Chukotka, past Wrangel Island to Pevek and back to Providence Bay.

In 1997, she was one of the four Ukrainian women who first visited the Antarctic station Akademik Vernadsky. There, the scientist was engaged in meteorological observations.

Since 2013, she has been a delegate from Ukraine to meetings of the Intergovernmental Panel on Climate Change (IPCC). She is the author of more than 100 publications.

In 2021, she received an award from President of Ukraine for her longtime contribution to Antarctic and climate change research.

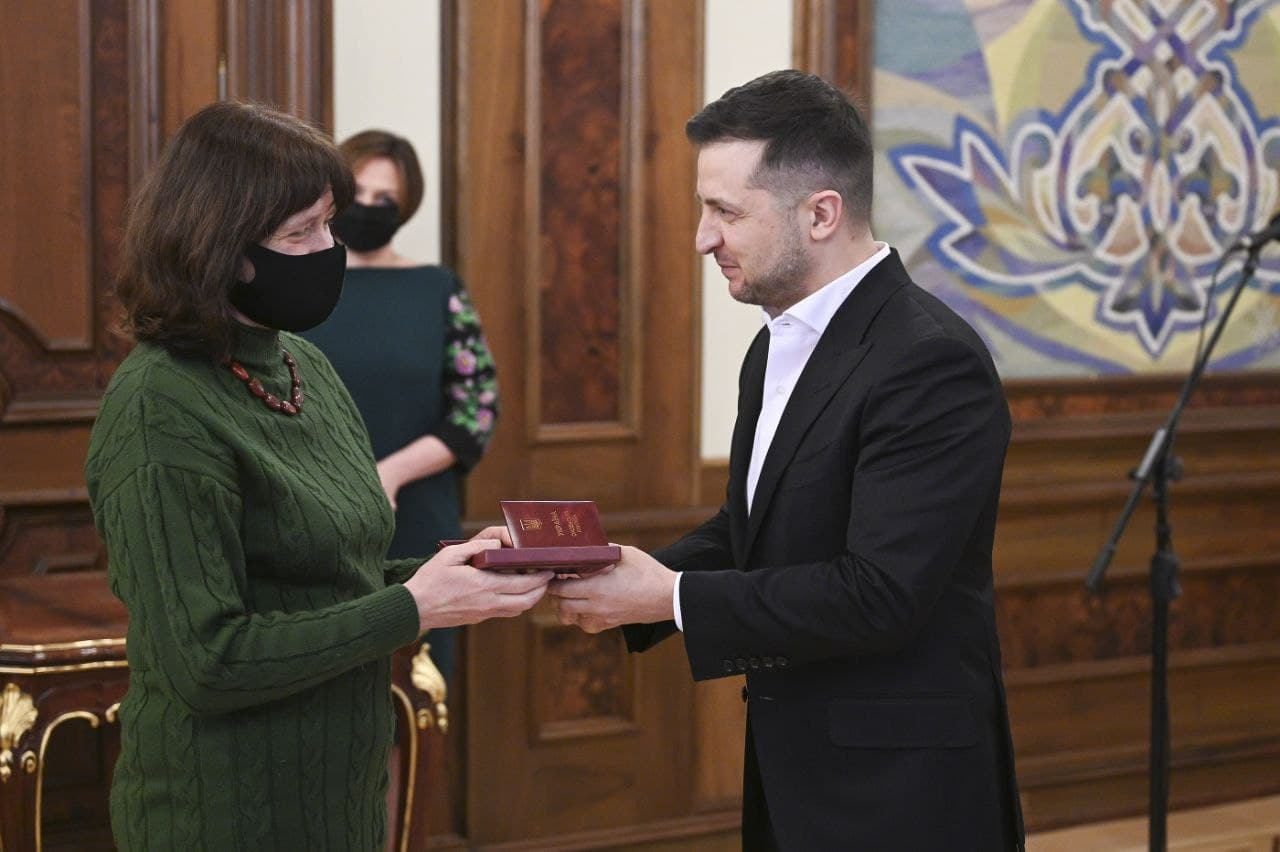
Svitlana Krakovska 2021 president award

In 2022, she appeared in Nature's 10 annual list "Ten people who helped shape science in 2022" by Nature — the leading British international weekly journal of science.

== Research & experience ==
Since 1991, Svitlana Krakovska has been a senior scientist and the Head of the Applied Meteorology and Climatology Department at the Ukrainian Hydrometeorological Institute (UHMI). Since 2018, she has also worked as a senior scientist in the Atmosphere Physics and Geospace Department at the National Antarctic Scientific Center of Ukraine (NASC).

Between 2018 and 2022, she contributed to the 6th Assessment Report (AR6) of Working Group I of the IPCC. She served as the lead author of the chapter Atlas, Interactive Atlas, and Technical Summary, as well as the Regional Fact Sheets on Europe and Asia. Additionally, she was the coordinating author of the Fact Sheet for Forestry and a contributing author for Chapters 2, 6, 10, 12, and the Summary for Policymakers (SPM).

In 2017, she worked as a review editor for Chapter 5 of the IPCC Special Report on Global Warming of 1.5°C.

From 2005 to 2006, she conducted postdoctoral research on the detailed spectral parameterization of mixed cloud microphysics in weather forecast models. This research was part of an INTAS fellowship and was carried out at EU host institutions, including MPI-M in Hamburg and Météo-France in Toulouse.

Between 1997 and 1998, she participated in the first and second Ukrainian Antarctic Overwinter Expeditions at the Ukrainian Antarctic Station Akademik Vernadsky (formerly British Faraday). During this time, she worked as a researcher, meteorologist, network administrator, and mountaineering instructor.

== Education ==
In 2004, Svitlana Krakovska earned a PhD in Geophysics from the Ukrainian Hydrometeorological Institute (UHMI). Her dissertation focused on the numerical simulation of the meso- and microstructure of frontal rainbands over target areas.

In 1991, she obtained a Master’s degree in Meteorology from the Leningrad Hydrometeorological Institute, which is now known as the Russian State Hydrometeorological University.

== International scientific projects (selection) ==
2021–2023	EuropeAid/140209/DH/SER/UA. Strengthening the capacity of regional and local administrations for implementation and enforcement of EU environmental and climate change legislation and development of infrastructure projects (APENA3); ENVIROPLAN & EGIS; Senior Climate Change Expert (local) to develop regional climate adaptation strategies for 3 pilot regions, to undertake detailed climate vulnerability assessment, including quantifiable vulnerability, risks and impacts assessment in pilot oblasts.
2021–2025	H2020-LC-CLA-2018-2019-2020. Building a low-carbon, climate resilient future: climate action in support of the Paris Agreement. Topic: LC-CLA-17-2020 EU project 101003590: Polar Regions in the Earth System (PolarRES).
2021–2024	Erasmus+ KA2: Open Practices, Transparency and Integrity for Modern Academia (OPTIMA) (618940-EPP-1-2020-1-UA-EPPKA2-CBHE-JP).
2021–2023	Enviro-PEEX(Plus) on ECMWF: Research and development for integrated meteorology – atmospheric composition multi-scales and – processes modelling for the Pan-Eurasian EXperiment (PEEX) domain for weather, air quality and climate applications. Coordinator of UHMI tasks devoted to pollution case studies and land-use change modelling.
2013–2022	Co-author of Ukraine’s 3rd, 4th, 5th and 6th National Communication under the UNFCCC, Section on Scenarios of possible climate change for Ukraine; nominated yearly by National Focal Point as a representative of Ukrainian Government to IPCC Sessions since 2013.
2020–2021	Capacity building and research on monitoring and evaluation of bioproductivity and crop forecasting using the Crop Growth Modeling System (CGMS) within the Program for Adaptation and Mitigation of Climate Change in the Aral Sea Basin (CAMP4ASB) within the cooperation between UHMI and Ecological Regional Center of Central Asia
2017	The Expert Facility Services CEEF2016-083-UA: Development of the national climate change adaptation policy concept for agriculture in Ukraine, under The ClimaEast project: Support to climate change mitigation and adaptation in the Eastern Neighboring Countries and Russia. National Expert.
2011–2013	Climate of the Carpathian Region (CARPATCLIM) on the request of EC JRC Institute for Environment and Sustainability (Italy). Rescuing and analysing daily climate data of Ukrainian meteo stations to build website Digital Climate Atlas of the Carpathians.
2012	EU project Avoidance of Greenhouse Gas Emissions by Restoration and Sustainable Management of Peatlands in Ukraine in the framework of the International Climate Protection Initiative of the German Federal Ministry for the Environment, Nature Conservation and Nuclear Safety (BMU). Scenarios analysis of climate change based on RCM multi-model projections in the region.
2011–2012	EU project Enhanced Economic & Legal Tools for Steppe Biodiversity Conservation and Climate Change Adaptation and Mitigation, at the request of EC for Nature Conservation (The Netherlands). Scenarios analysis of climate change based on RCM multi-model projections for the steppe part of Ukraine.
2011	EU project Integrating Climate Change into Vulnerable Ecosystems Management: natural parks in wetlands and forest areas (Ukraine), at the request of Association VERSeau Development (France). Estimation of current and future climate changes for Northern Ukraine based on RCM projections.
