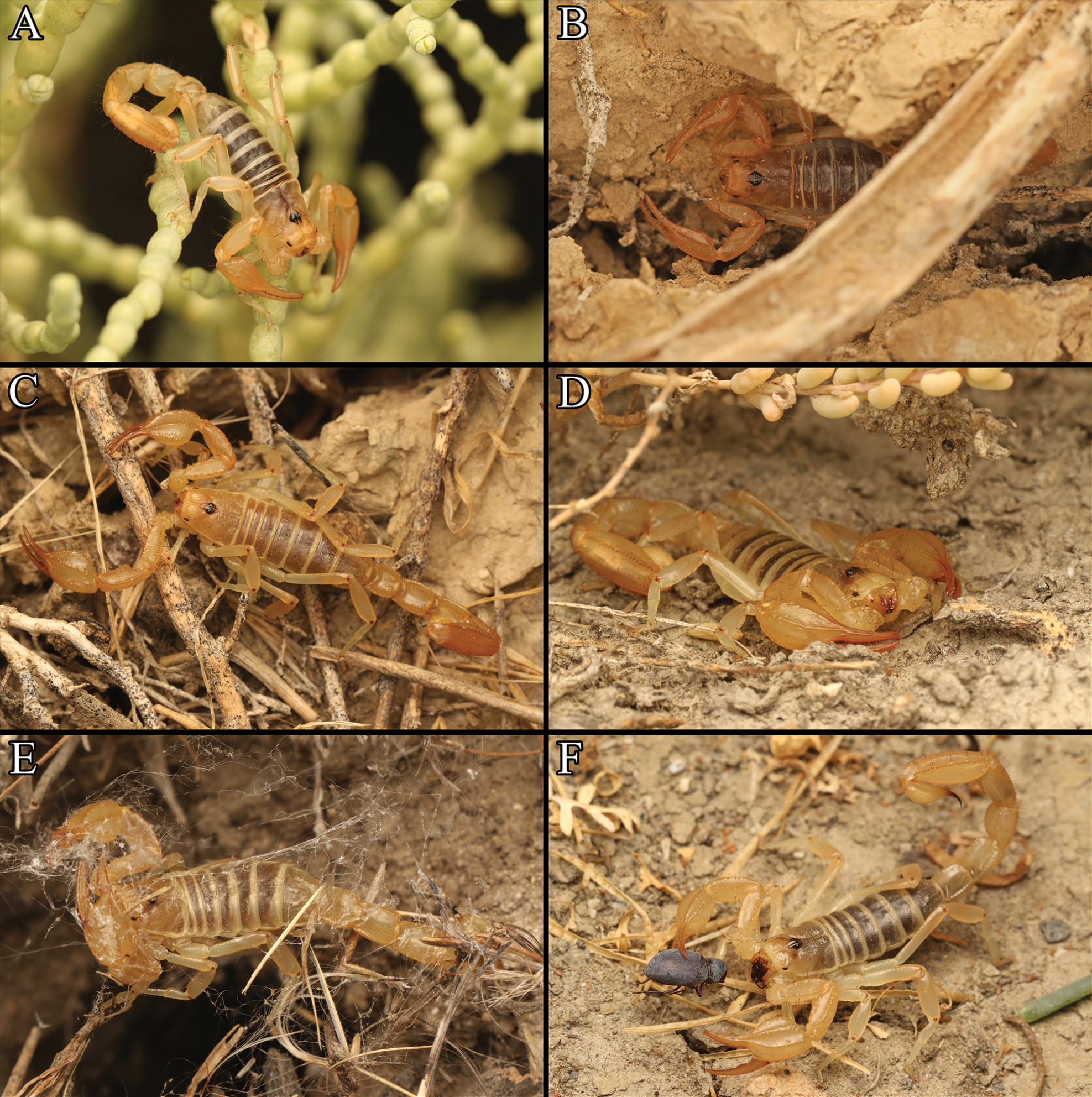
- Images of Paruroctonus tulare in the wild from the original species description.

Scientific classification
- Kingdom: Animalia
- Phylum: Arthropoda
- Subphylum: Chelicerata
- Class: Arachnida
- Order: Scorpiones
- Family: Vaejovidae
- Genus: Paruroctonus
- Species: P. tulare

Binomial name
- Paruroctonus tulare Jain, Forbes, Gorneau and Esposito, 2023
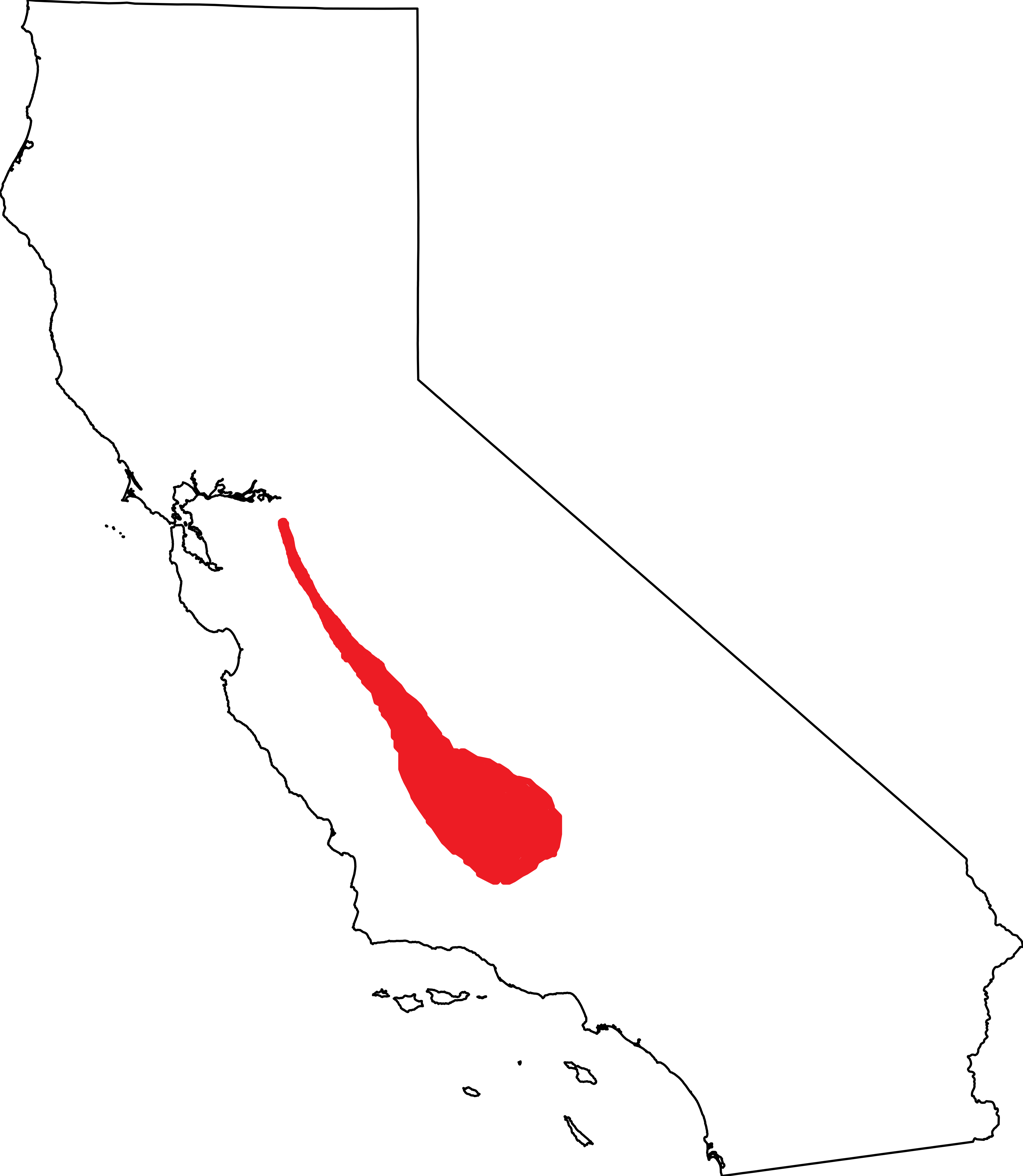

= Paruroctonus tulare =

Species of scorpion

Paruroctonus tulare is a species of scorpion in the genus Paruroctonus. It lives in the deserts of Northern and Southern California where it is found in several areas of the San Joaquin Valley. The species epithet tulare is in reference to the historically diverted Tulare Lake and associated basin around which the scorpion is now found.

== Discovery ==
Just like the previously described P. soda and P. conclusus, P. tulare was recognized by Prakrit Jain and Harper Forbes as potentially new when observations uploaded to iNaturalist could not be assigned to a known species. The pair was assisted in making a new species description by Lauren Esposito and Jacob Gorneau of the California Academy of Sciences.

== Conservation ==
According to the researchers who described the species, P. tulare meets all necessary criteria to be assessed as endangered or critically endangered under the IUCN Red List framework. It is considered an alkali sink specialist species and appears to have experience significant range and population contractions due to habitat degradation and increasing prevalence of invasive species.
