= Paruroctonus utahensis =

Scientific classification
- Domain: Eukaryota
- Kingdom: Animalia
- Phylum: Arthropoda
- Subphylum: Chelicerata
- Class: Arachnida
- Order: Scorpiones
- Family: Vaejovidae
- Genus: Paruroctonus
- Species: P. utahensis

Binomial name
- Paruroctonus utahensis (Williams, 1968)

Synonyms
- Vaejovis utahensis Williams, 1968

Species of scorpion

Paruroctonus utahensis is a species of scorpion, commonly referred to as the eastern sand scorpion. It has a range from Utah (which is where the species epithet comes from) to Chihuahua, Mexico. It feeds on many types of arthropods, with one of its most important prey items being Ammobaenetes phrixocnemoides.
