= Intrepicalcin =

Short peptide toxin

Intrepicalcin (ViCaTx1) is a short peptide toxin found in the venom of scorpion Vaejovis intrepidus. It is one of a group of short, basic peptides called calcins, which bind to ryanodine receptors (RyRs) and thereby trigger calcium release from the sarcoplasmic reticulum.

== Etymology ==
The name intrepicalcin is a combination of the species name of the organism that produces it (Vaejovis intrepidus) and the family name of short toxins that it belongs to (calcins).

== Source ==
Intrepicalcin is a toxin derived from the venom gland of the scorpion Vaejovis intrepidus . This species belongs to the family of Vaejovidae in the order of Scorpiones. Vaejovis intrepidus is endemic to central Mexico.

== Chemistry ==
=== Structure and family ===
Intrepicalcin (ViCaTx1) belongs to the scorpion calcin family. The structure of calcins is specified by the Inhibitor Cystine Knot (ICK) motif. This folding motif is found in many toxins interacting with calcium channels in spiders and snails and distinguishes them from sodium, potassium and chloride channel toxins in scorpions. All calcins are composed of 33 amino acids, among which are 6 cysteines. These cysteines are highly conserved and form three disulfide bonds that are important for the ICK motif. In intrepicalcin and some other calcins, three of these cysteines are embedded in three 𝛽 strands.

The 3D structure of intrepicalcin has not yet been solved. However, the 3D structure of imperacalcin, another member of the calcin family, has been elucidated with ^{1}H-NMR. Based on the fact that intrepicalcin and imperacalcin have a 70% sequence homology (see Homology), it is predicted that intrepicalcin has a coiled, spherical structure. The ICK motif contains three disulfide bridges embedded in 𝛽 strands. Most positively-charged residues (lysine and arginine) are located on the frontal side of the peptide. However, compared to other calcins, intrepicalcin contains two extra positively-charged basic lysines (residue 12 and 14) on its dorsal side. Therefore, its charge separation is the lowest of all calcins.

=== Homology ===
The most closely related calcin is vejocalcin, which only differs in its 14th residue (N in vejocalcin versus K in intrepicalcin) and has a matching identity of 97.0%. Imperacalcin, on the other hand, has a matching identity of only 69.7% (ten different residues) and has the lowest similarity with intrepicalcin of all currently known members of the calcin family. This suggests that within this family, intrepicalcin and imperacalcin have the smallest common evolutionary origin. Furthermore, in general the C-terminal part of the calcin peptide (residues 15-33), containing two of the cysteine-containing 𝛽 strands, is relatively conserved compared to the N-terminal part (residues 1-14). The C-terminal part thus also shows more homology across the calcin family than the N-terminal part.

== Target ==
Intrepicalcin exerts its toxic effect by binding to ryanodine receptor 1 (RyR1), which is a calcium release ion channel present in mammalian skeletal muscle cells. RyR1s can be opened by direct protein-protein interaction with dihydropyridine receptors, which are voltage-sensing L-type calcium channels (Ca_{V}1.1). When the muscle depolarizes, a conformational change in Ca_{V}1.1 activates RyR1, which then opens and allows calcium release from the sarcoplasmic reticulum. This phenomenon is called coupled gating. RyR1s seem to be able to open without this interaction as well, but the underlying mechanism is not yet fully understood. RyR1 consists of four subunits and has binding sites for several regulatory molecules, such as calcium, calmodulin, ATP and magnesium. The opening of the channel involves two hinge glycines. The receptor is expressed in mammals, but homologues exist in avian and amphibian skeletal muscles.

== Mode of action ==
Intrepicalcin stabilizes the opening of RyR1 and brings it into a reversible and long-lasting subconductance state. This subconductance state is 55% of the full conductance state of the channel and enables a constant calcium release from the sarcoplasmic reticulum. The precise binding site of intrepicalcin on RyR1 is not known. However, imperacalcin is known to bind a site within the ion conduction channel. Since all known calcins induce the same modifications, a common binding site seems likely. Intrepicalcin and calcins in general are able to cross the plasma membrane and can thus translocate between cells.

== Toxicity ==
The ryanodine receptor 1 (RyR1) is expressed in skeletal muscles in mammals. The alterations in the calcium potentials which are caused by intrepicalcin interaction with RyR1, affect these skeletal muscles and result in muscular paralysis. This can contribute to the immobilization of the predators and preys of the scorpion Vaejovis intrepidus.
