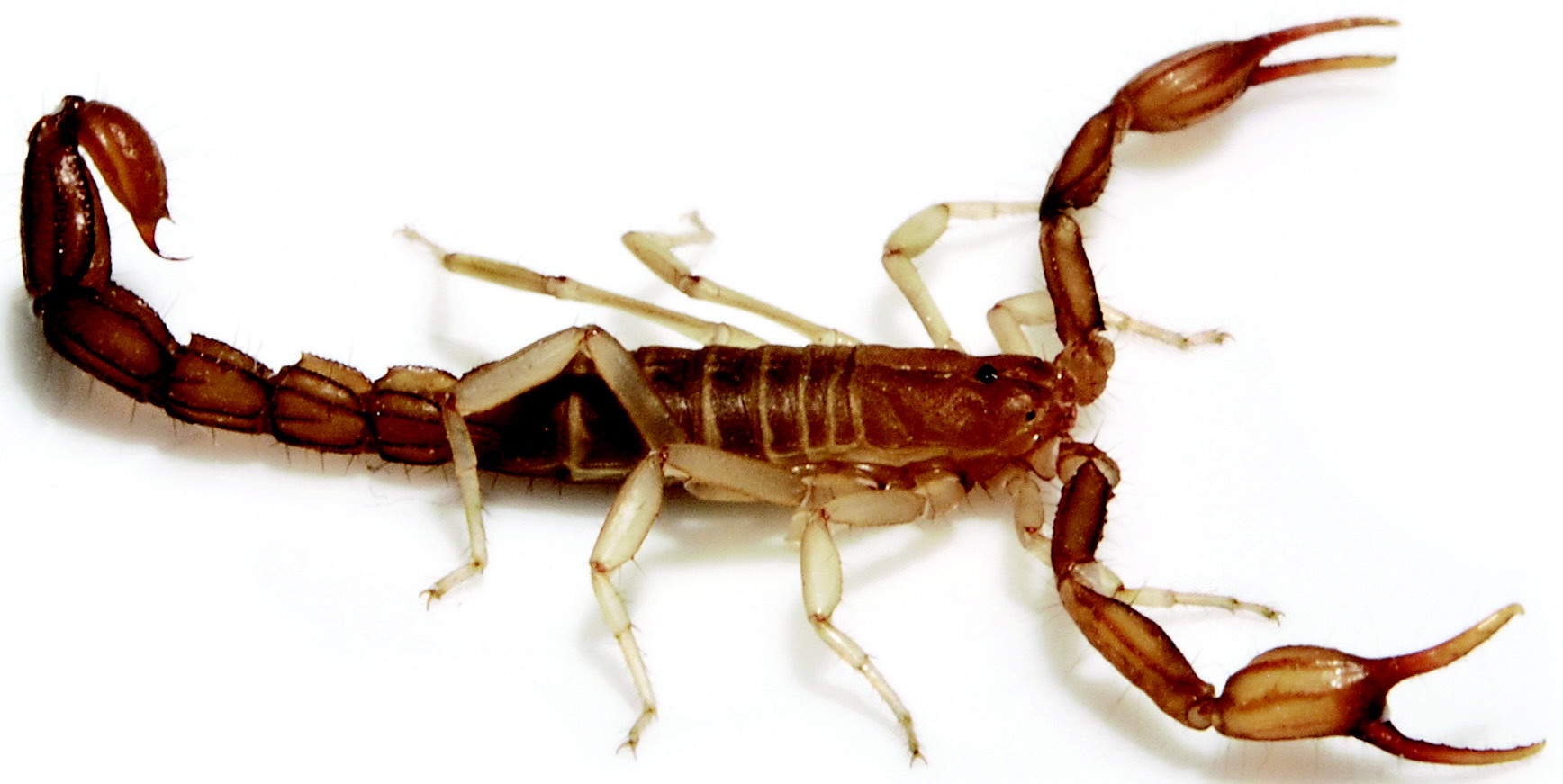
- The only specimen discovered from the species W. inyoensis

Scientific classification
- Domain: Eukaryota
- Kingdom: Animalia
- Phylum: Arthropoda
- Subphylum: Chelicerata
- Class: Arachnida
- Order: Scorpiones
- Family: Vaejovidae
- Genus: Wernerius
- Species: W. inyoensis

Binomial name
- Wernerius inyoensis Webber, Graham & Jaeger, 2012

= Wernerius inyoensis =

Species of scorpion

Wernerius inyoensis is a species of scorpion in the taxomic family Vaejovidae. W. inyoensis is the third species described in the genus Wernerius. Wernerius inyoensis lives throughout the Inyo Mountains of Death Valley National Park in the southwestern North America, eastern California just like many scorpion species discovered around the year 2009.

The species is small compared to most North American species of scorpions being 16.4 to 17 millimeters in length. W. inyoensis had a strong subaculear spine similar to other species of Wernerius (W. mumai and W. spicatus). Wernerius inyoensis had a base pigmentation of a yellow-orange (with some red pigmentation) with a darker carinae on the pedipalp appendage and the metasoma. Wernerius inyoensis is distinguished from the species Wernerius mumai by Wernerius inyoensis smaller adult body size, robust femur and the pedipalp appendage being thinner.

A single male specimen of Wernerius inoyensis had been discovered at 37.2299°N, 117.9568°W. However what makes this specimen special is that W. inoyensis was discovered 400 kilometers from other Wernerius species which are in the lower Colorado river and Joshua Tree National Park.
