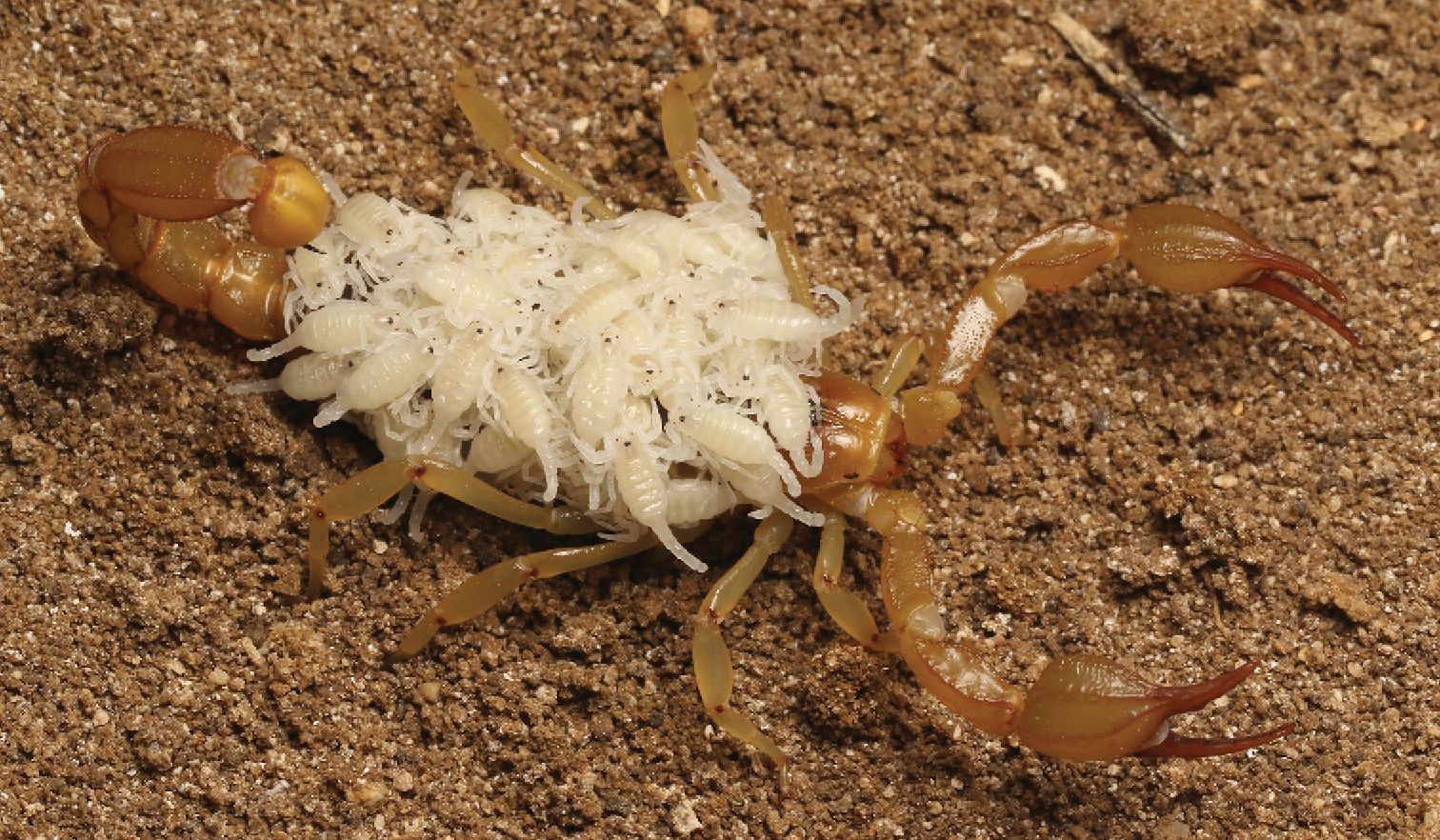
- Adult female Paruroctonus soda with 51 newly born juveniles

Scientific classification
- Domain: Eukaryota
- Kingdom: Animalia
- Phylum: Arthropoda
- Subphylum: Chelicerata
- Class: Arachnida
- Order: Scorpiones
- Family: Vaejovidae
- Genus: Paruroctonus
- Species: P. soda

Binomial name
- Paruroctonus soda Jain, Forbes, and Esposito, 2022

= Paruroctonus soda =

Species of scorpion

Paruroctonus soda is a species of scorpion in the genus Paruroctonus. It lives in the deserts of Southern California where it is found in dry lake beds and playas of Soda Lake and Koehn Lake. P. soda is an alkali sink specialist species.

== Discovery ==
Paruroctonus soda was described alongside Paruroctonus conclusus, both species having come to the attention of Prakrit Jain and Harper Forbes when observations uploaded to iNaturalist could not be assigned to a known species. They were assisted by Lauren Esposito of the California Academy of Sciences.

The species was named after Soda Lake, Southern California where it lives.
