= Paruroctonus conclusus =

Scientific classification
- Kingdom: Animalia
- Phylum: Arthropoda
- Subphylum: Chelicerata
- Class: Arachnida
- Order: Scorpiones
- Family: Vaejovidae
- Genus: Paruroctonus
- Species: P. conclusus

Binomial name
- Paruroctonus conclusus Jain, Forbes, and Esposito, 2022

Species of scorpion

Paruroctonus conclusus is a species of scorpion in the genus Paruroctonus. It lives in the deserts of Southern California where it associates with alkali clay soils in the Mojave Desert area of eastern Kern County. P. conclusus is an alkali sink specialist species with an extremely small range.

== Discovery ==
Photographs of a new unknown scorpion species were uploaded to the citizen science platform iNaturalist in 2013. Paruroctonus conclusus was described alongside Paruroctonus soda, both species having come to the attention of high school students Prakrit Jain and Harper Forbes when uploaded observations could not be assigned to a known species. They were assisted by Lauren Esposito of the California Academy of Sciences and acted as first authors when describing the new scorpions in 2022.

== Distribution and conservation ==
The specific epithet conclusus, Latin for "confined", was given to this species based upon its very limited known range. Though no formal assessments have taken place yet, P. conclusus is only known to exist in a strip of unprotected land less than 2 kilometers in length around the playa Koehn Lake. Given the small distribution, this species is extremely vulnerable to extinction via infrastructure or residential development projects. The discoverers sought to have it listed as a threatened species in their novel species publication for these reasons.
