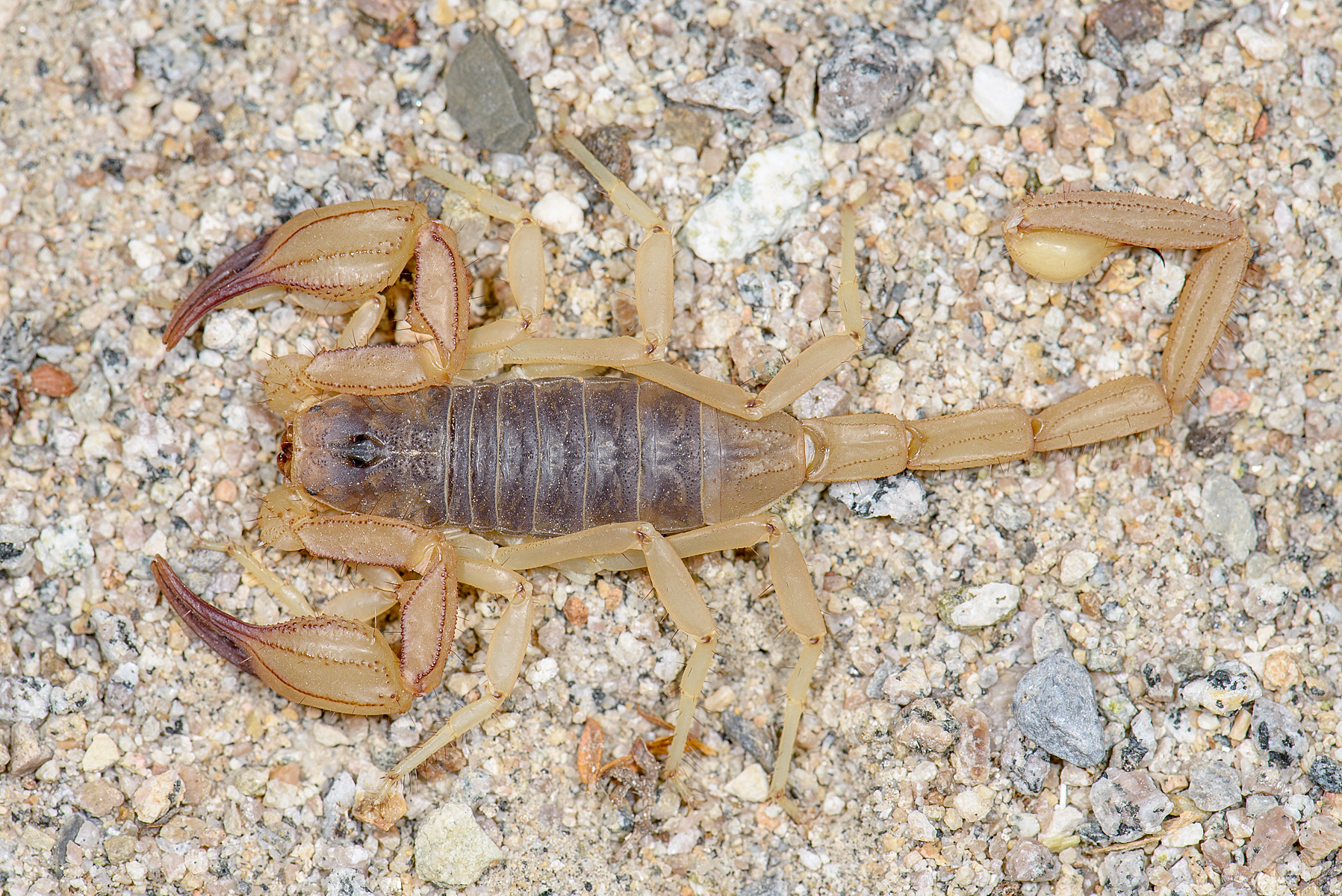
- Smeringurus vachoni

Scientific classification
- Domain: Eukaryota
- Kingdom: Animalia
- Phylum: Arthropoda
- Subphylum: Chelicerata
- Class: Arachnida
- Order: Scorpiones
- Family: Vaejovidae
- Genus: Smeringurus; Haradon, 1983

Species
- See text

= Smeringurus =

Genus of scorpions

Smeringurus is a small genus of scorpions native to Mexico and the southwestern United States within the family Vaejovidae. It is closely related to the genus Paruroctonus, of which it was formerly considered a subgenus.

== Species ==
List according to The Scorpion Files:

- Smeringurus aridus (Soleglad, 1972)
- Smeringurus grandis (Williams, 1970)
- Smeringurus mesaensis (Stahnke, 1957)
- Smeringurus vachoni (Stahnke, 1961)
