= P. silvestrii =

P. silvestrii may refer to:

- Paruroctonus silvestrii, the California common scorpion
- Paulownia silvestrii, a plant species in the genus Paulownia
- Pegoscapus silvestrii (Grandi), a fig wasp species in the genus Pegoscapus
- Philodromus silvestrii, Caporiacco, 1940, a crab spider species in the genus Philodromus and the family Philodromidae found in Somalia
- Pseudobiantes silvestrii, Mello-Leitão, 1944, a harvestman species in the genus Pseudobiantes and the family Epedanidae
- Pseudotyrannochthonius silvestrii, Ellingsen, 1905, a pseudoscorpion species in the genus Pseudotyrannochthonius and the family Chthoniidae found in Chile

== See also ==
- Silvestrii (disambiguation)
