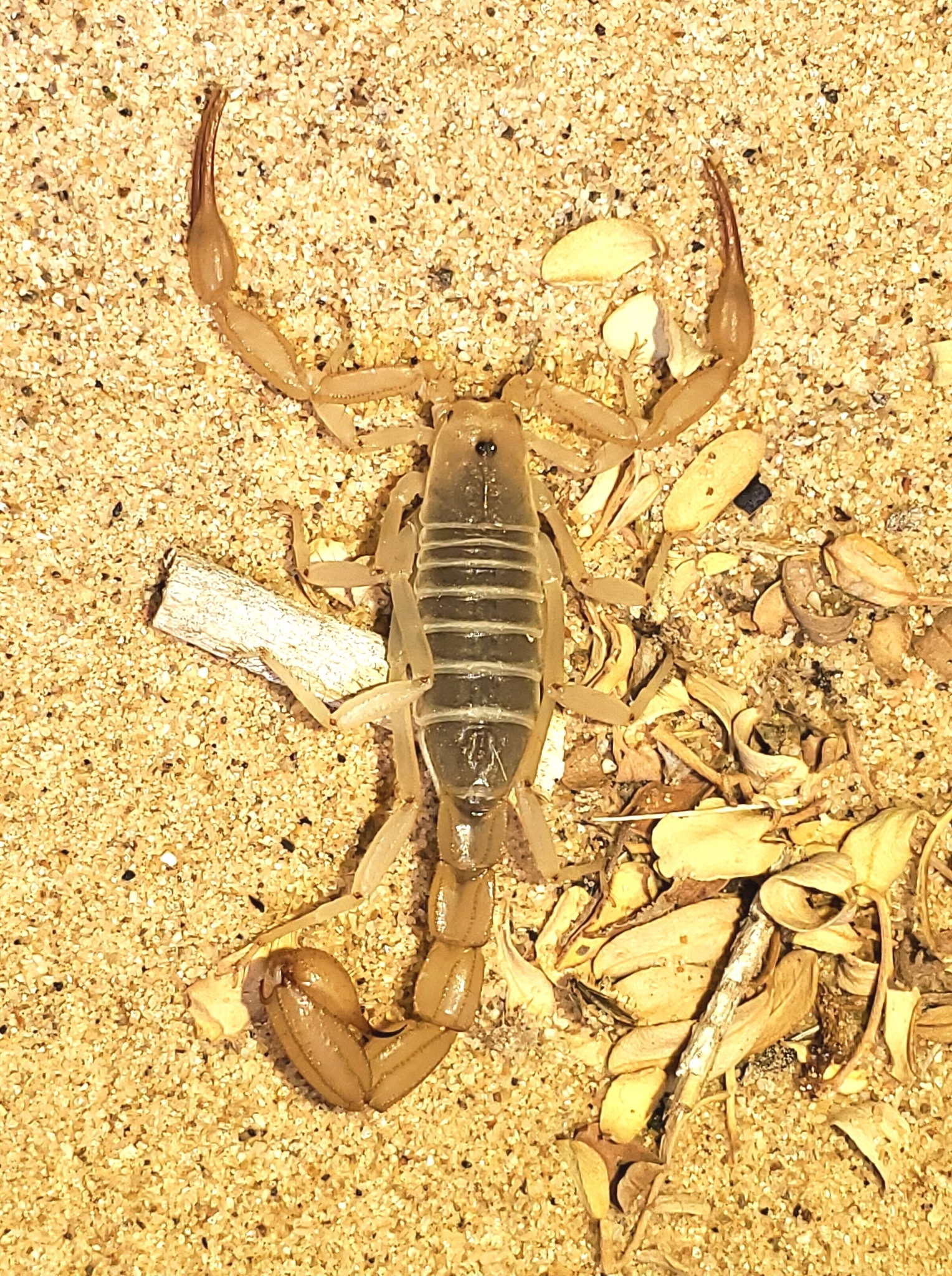

Scientific classification
- Domain: Eukaryota
- Kingdom: Animalia
- Phylum: Arthropoda
- Subphylum: Chelicerata
- Class: Arachnida
- Order: Scorpiones
- Family: Vaejovidae
- Genus: Paravaejovis
- Species: P. waeringi

Binomial name
- Paravaejovis waeringi Williams, 1970

= Paravaejovis waeringi =

Dune devil scorpion

Paravaejovis waeringi, also known as the dune devil scorpion, is a species of scorpion native to the Colorado Desert of North America.
