= Sand scorpion =

Sand scorpion may refer to:

- Black sand scorpion (Urodacus novaehollandiae)
- Giant sand scorpion or Dune scorpion (Smeringurus mesaensis)
- Yellow sand scorpion (Lychas buchari)
