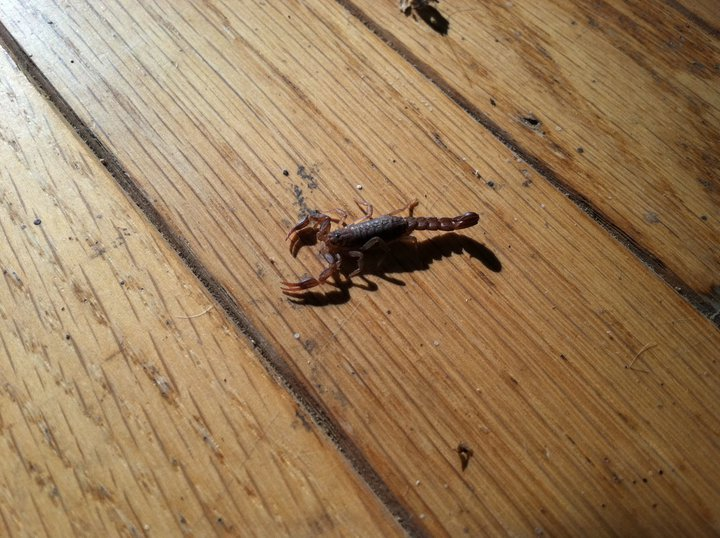

Scientific classification
- Kingdom: Animalia
- Phylum: Arthropoda
- Subphylum: Chelicerata
- Class: Arachnida
- Order: Scorpiones
- Family: Vaejovidae
- Genus: Vaejovis
- Species: V. carolinianus

Binomial name
- Vaejovis carolinianus (Beauvois, 1805)

= Vaejovis carolinianus =

Species of scorpion

Vaejovis carolinianus, the southern unstriped scorpion, also known as the southern devil scorpion, is a species of scorpion in the family Vaejovidae.

== Description ==
Vaejovis carolinianus is a small, dark scorpion native to the southeastern United States. Common within good habitat, this species can be locally abundant. Generally less than 2 inches in length with both claws and tail extended. The legs and claws may be dark reddish or brownish in color, with the carapace and abdomen presenting a dull nearly black coloration.

== Habitat and Distribution ==
Found primarily within the southern Appalachians, with most observations occurring within the Carolinas, Georgia, Alabama, Tennessee, and Kentucky. Scattered observations occur in Florida, Louisiana, and Mississippi.

Within its range this species prefers mesic mixed woodland, being readily found under logs, stones, or the bark of standing dead trees. It readily enters homes and other human structures and can fit through very fine crevices or gaps. As with all scorpions it may easily be found using blacklights due to the fluorescence of the exoskeleton.

== Ecology ==
A predator of smaller arthropods, this scorpion will feed on a wide range of prey species. In captivity it will accept termites, mealworms, and crickets, including prey nearly as large or larger than itself. It favors soft bodied species when available. May be cannibalistic on smaller specimens of its own species, and early instar young will cannibalize if confined.

== Reproduction ==
As with all scorpions this species has live birth. It may produce up to 26 young.

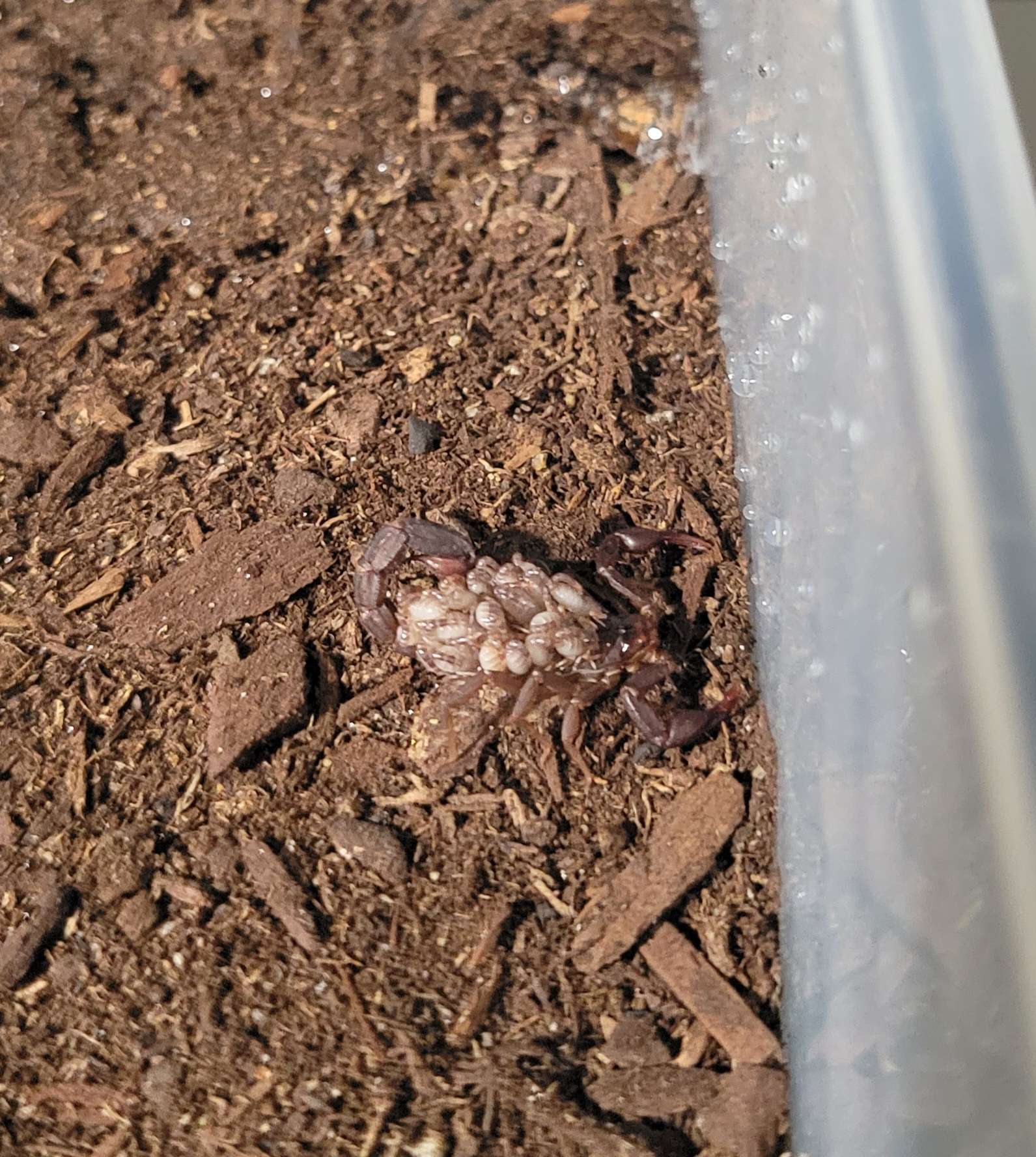
Mother V. carolinianus with neonate young, or "scorplings"
