= Vejocalcin =

Toxin

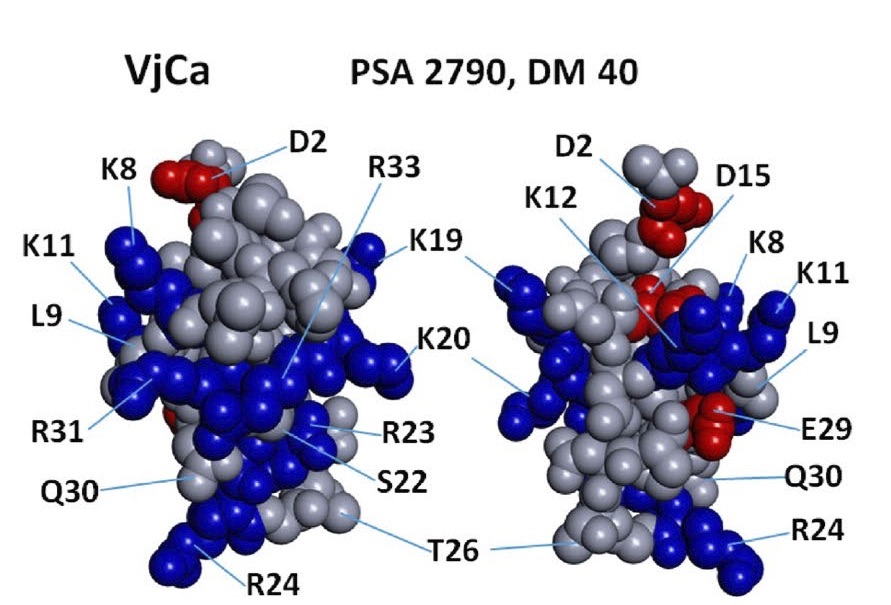
- 3-Dimensional modelling of vejocalcin toxin.

Names and Taxonomy
- Recommended name: Vejocalcin
- Short name: VjCa
- Organism: Vaejovis mexicanus
- Taxonomic Identifier: 993612 [NCBI]
- Taxonomic Lineage: Vaejovis

Family and Domains
- Domain: Knottin
- Sequence Similarities: Scorpion Calcin Family
- InterPro: IPR012632
- Pfam: PF08099
- PROSITE: PS60028

Identifiers
- UniProt: P0DPT1

Vejocalcin (VjCa, also called vejocalcine) is a toxin from the venom of the Mexican scorpion Vaejovis mexicanus. Vejocalcin is a member of the calcin family of toxins. It acts as a cell-penetrating peptide (CPP); it binds with high affinity and specificity to skeletal ryanodine receptor 1 (RYR1) of the sarcoplasmic reticulum, thereby triggering calcium release from intracellular Ca^{2+} stores.

== Source and etymology ==
Vejocalcin is produced by Vaejovis mexicanus, a scorpion endemic to North and Central America. While Vaejovis mexicanus was originally described in 1836, vejocalcin was only isolated in 2016. This toxin was named after the scorpion that produces the peptide as well as its structural similarity to other toxins of the scorpion calcin family.

== Chemistry ==
=== Homology and family ===
On the basis of its amino acid structure, vejocalcin belongs to the family of scorpion calcin toxins, a group of selective, high-affinity membrane-permeable ligands of RyRs. Vejocalcin shares significant sequence similarity with other members of this family.

=== Structure ===
Vejocalcin has a molecular mass of approximately 3.8 kDa and an isoelectric point of 9.3.

Physical and chemical characteristics of vejocalcin
Formula	Amino Acids	Molecular Mass	Molecular Volume	Negatively charged residues	Positively charged residues
C_{149}H_{254}N_{56}O_{47}S_{6}	33	3,774.4	2,692.7	3 (9%)	9 (27%)

It is a relatively small protein, consisting of only 33 amino acids:

Ala-Asp-Cys-Leu-Ala-His-Leu-Lys-Leu-Cys-Lys-Lys-Asn-Asn-Asp-Cys-Cys-Ser-Lys-Lys-Cys-Ser-Arg-Arg-Gly-Thr-Asn-Pro-Glu-Glu-Arg-Cys-Arg

Notably, two calcins produced by two closely related scorpions - vejocalcin from Vaejovis mexicanus and intrepicalcin from Vaejovis intrepidus - display a 97% similarity in their primary sequence, differing in only one amino acid at position 14 (Asn and Lys, respectively). Despite this marked similarity, vejocalcin exhibits a binding affinity to RyR1 that is 4.7-fold higher than that of intrepicalcin.

Vejocalcin shows an arrangement of charged residues, in which most of the positively charged residues are segregated on one side of the molecule, whereas neutral and negatively charged residues are clustered on the opposite side. This arrangement generates a discrete dipole moment (DM) and appears to be a prevalent feature across all toxins of the calcin family. Interestingly, vejocalcin has the smallest charge segregation among peptides in the calcin family. However, comparisons among different calcins show that, for each peptide, there appears to be no correlation between DM, binding affinity and subconductance state attributes.

Maturation of vejocalcin involves post-translational modification of its tertiary structure. Specifically, three disulfide bonds are formed between cysteine residues in positions 3–17, 10–21, and 16–32. These three disulfide bonds arrange themselves spatially to form a “disulfide through disulfide knot”, which is an evolutionary conserved structural motif known as the inhibitor cystine knot motif (ICK motif), thus defining the whole protein as a knottin. This three-dimensional arrangement confers the protein remarkable stability and builds the structural core of its pharmacological active site. ICK motifs have also been shown to be characteristic of calcium channel blocking toxins produced by snails and spiders.

== Target ==
Though the exact target of vejocalcin on RyR1 remains unclear, it is thought that calcins bind to RyR1 at a binding site different from that of ryanodine, as the combination of calcins and ryanodine can have a cumulative effect on RyR1. Like most calcins, vejocalcin shows a fast association rate, as well as a reversible effect, due to free dissociation from the binding site. Single channel experiments and modeling of the kinetics and gating of RyR1 during calcin exposure suggest that the RyR1 transits between closed and open states and a single calcin molecule binds to the channel when the channel is in the open state. It is hypothesized that globular calcins, such as vejocalcin, can affect RyR1 channels by entering the cytosolic opening and accessing the binding site in the core of the channel. The precise mechanism by which calcins bind to their target, however, remains controversial.

== Mode of action ==
Using single channel electrophysiological recordings, it was found that RyR1 channels exposed to vejocalcin move from an open state to a subconductance open state, with the latter conducting approximately 60% of the full-conductance level. Evidence from [^{3}H]ryanodine binding assays shows that vejocalcin is able to enhance [^{3}H]ryanodine binding to RyR1. This effect of vejocalcin is dose-dependent and happens at all Ca^{2+} levels, with an apparent dissociation constant K_{d}= 3.7 ± 0.4 nM. Mechanistically, vejocalcin is thought to promote this action by increasing the “openness” of the channel in a long-lasting, reversible and transient manner.

Noteworthy, vejocalcin triggers dose-dependent Ca^{2+} release from skeletal sarcoplasmic vesicles. High concentrations of vejocalcin drive incomplete, submaximal depletion of Ca^{2+} load through the process of calcium-induced calcium release (CICR) from intracellular Ca^{2+} stores. These functional effects are also characteristic of other calcins as detected in structure–function relationship assays.

== Toxicity ==
While the effects of vejocalcin have not yet been studied, in vivo toxicity testing of hemicalcin has shown that the peptide induces neurotoxic symptoms in mice, followed by death. The comparable activity of vejocalcin and hemicalcin on RyR1 suggests a similar toxicity of vejocalcin. However, given the high variability in RyR-affinity between various calcins, the LD_{50} may vary significantly.

== Therapeutic use ==
Despite their highly ionized nature, calcins are able to penetrate cell membranes with high efficiency. Thus, they act as cell-penetrating peptides (CPPs) and can transport large, membrane-impermeable cargos across the plasma membrane directly into the cell. This property of calcins, combined with their high-affinity and specificity to RyRs, may have positive implications for intracellular drug delivery, particularly for the treatment of RyR channelopathies.
