= Serradigitus miscionei =

Scientific classification
- Kingdom: Animalia
- Phylum: Arthropoda
- Subphylum: Chelicerata
- Class: Arachnida
- Order: Scorpiones
- Family: Vaejovidae
- Genus: Serradigitus
- Species: S. miscionei

Binomial name
- Serradigitus miscionei Ayrey, 2011

Species of scorpion

Serradigitus miscionei, commonly known as the Walnut Gulch scorpion, is a rare species of scorpion found only in southern Arizona, United States. This species is one of three Serradigitus species found in Arizona.

== Description ==
Serradigitus miscionei is a small reddish, brown scorpion, adult females reach an average length of only 25 millimetres (1 in). It was discovered while searching for lizards on the walls of a wash that empties into the San Pedro River. It was described on the first of February 2011 by Richard Ayrey.

== Ecology ==
Serradigitus miscionei seems to prefer vertical sand substrate, which is not commonly seen in other scorpion species. Like most scorpions, Serradigitus miscionei feeds primarily on small invertebrates. Its venom is not known to be medically significant to humans, dogs or other mammals.
