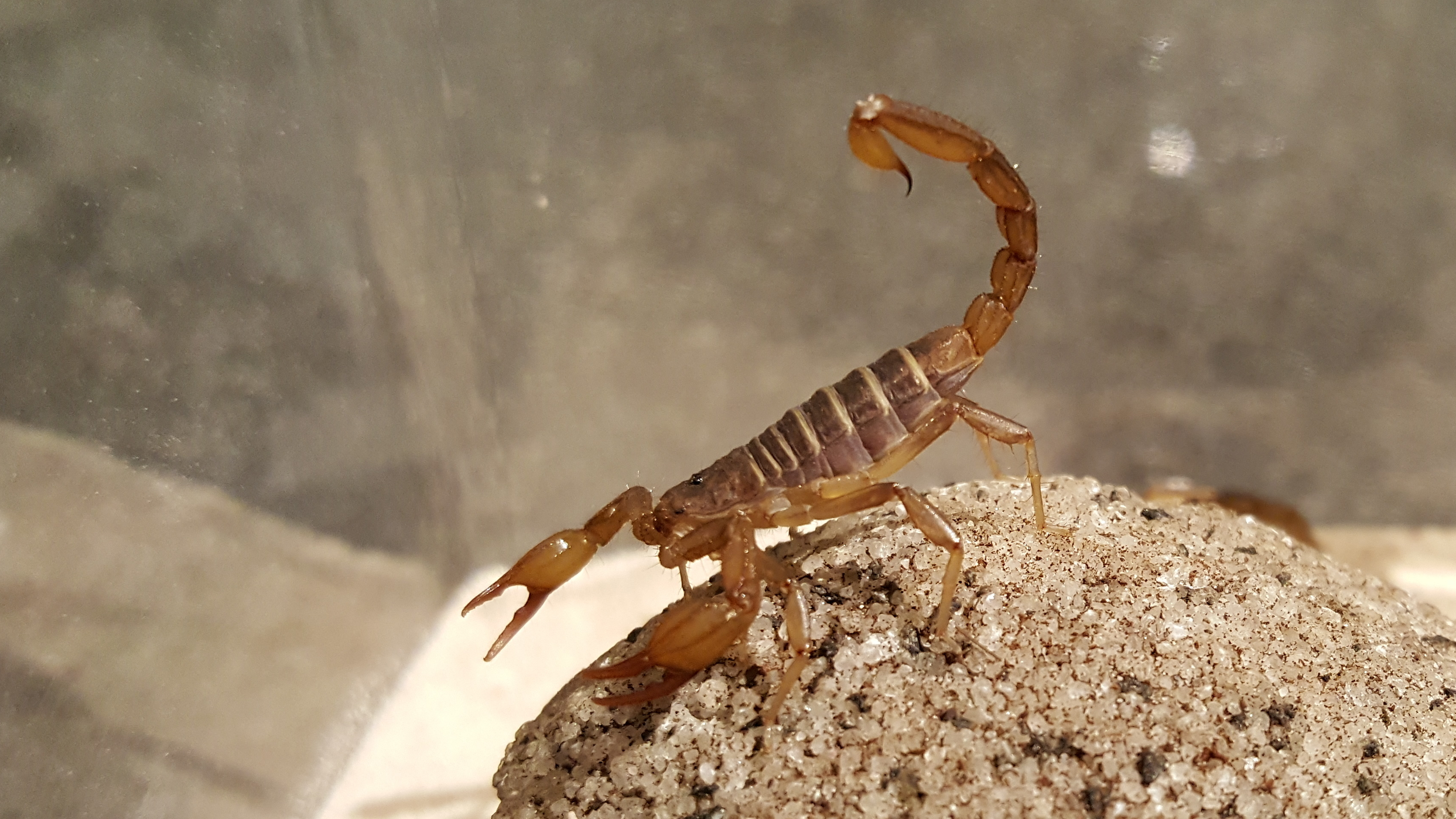

Scientific classification
- Domain: Eukaryota
- Kingdom: Animalia
- Phylum: Arthropoda
- Subphylum: Chelicerata
- Class: Arachnida
- Order: Scorpiones
- Family: Vaejovidae
- Genus: Paruroctonus
- Species: P. boreus

Binomial name
- Paruroctonus boreus (Girard, 1854)

= Paruroctonus boreus =

Species of scorpion

Paruroctonus boreus, commonly known as the northern scorpion, is a species of scorpion in the family Vaejovidae. It is the northernmost species of scorpion, the only scorpion found in Canada, and one of the scorpions with the broadest distribution over North America.

== Taxonomy and naming ==
The P. boreus species derives its name from members of a group identified as Scorpio (Telegonus) boreus by Charles Girard in 1854. On the basis of typical characteristics which distinguished members of the species from the Vaejovis genus, it was subsequently assigned the Paruroctonus genus name.

The genus name Paruroctonus is composed of the Latin pār which means "equal" or "like", followed by the term uroctonus, itself constructed from the Greek words οὐρά (ourá) meaning "tail" and κτείνω (kteínō) meaning "to kill". The Latin epithet boreus is equivalent to the Ancient Greek word Βορέᾱς (Boréās) which means "northern".

== Distribution and habitat ==
Sightings of P. boreus have been reported over broad areas of North America and it is described as one of the most widely spread scorpions on the continent. In the United States, areas where it is found include the state of Arizona in the Southwest, Nebraska, South Dakota, and North Dakota in the Midwest, and most of the West region (California, Colorado, Idaho, Montana, Nevada, Oregon, Utah, Washington and Wyoming). In Canada, it is also found in the provinces of British Columbia and Alberta, as far north as 52° N. Several anecdotal reports show them found near Medicine Hat, Alberta during dry years. It is the only scorpion found in Canada, as well as the northernmost species of scorpion in the world, with specimens collected in the Okanagan valley of British Columbia, southwestern Saskatchewan, and more widely in Alberta.

The species has been observed to inhabit various terrains typically bordered by tall mountains or low elevation valleys. In northern areas, it has a tendency to mainly occupy sagebrush and comparable dwelling places and reside at low elevations above sea level (200 m). In southern areas, it occupies a greater variety of natural environments and resides at moderate elevations (1900 m). In Idaho, it is most often collected on barren, fissured, or rocky soil on the sloping surface of hills. In the daytime, openings in the soil and stones offer it protection. Individuals are most frequently discovered lying directly on the soil surface and may also be observed on plants up to 50 cm above the soil surface. Specimen collection in 12 distinct plant communities in southeastern Idaho suggested a preference for locations with a minimum vegetation ground coverage of 85%, comprised roughly of broad-leaved plants covering 60% of the ground and grasses covering less than 5%.

== Morphology and identification ==
P. boreus has been described as moderately sized in comparison to other scorpions, with a common light yellow color. There is a black pattern forming a V which centers on the median eyes as well as dim streaks across preabdomen divisions. The adult female is consistently bigger than the male, featuring longer and wider carapace and preabdomen. Females average a total length of around 38.9 mm while the males average around 35.5 mm. Females also demonstrate a lower number of pectinal teeth than males.

== Behavior and life cycle ==
P. boreus scorpions are almost exclusively nocturnal with most movements and hunts taking place during the night. Emergence from their burrows occurs between 21:30 and 23:00, and they will not leave their burrow during rainfall or if temperatures are below 10 °C. If individuals do not emerge by 23:00, they do not seek to feed that night. They are most active within the initial two hours of nighttime with surface activity progressively diminishing thereafter. They also show increased activity in the 3–5 days following a rainfall.

There is a dramatic discrepancy between how much the males and the females move around daily—males will routinely roam up to six times as far as their female counterparts. Having identified an adequate shelter location, females tend to restrict above ground activities to the shelter's immediate surroundings. They also demonstrate more frequent surface activity than males, which may serve as a means of increasing their odds of encountering mating partners who travel to a much greater extent.

P. boreus individuals will engage in territorial fights, with the larger scorpion usually winning the fight and then cannibalizing the loser, although this is not always the case and smaller females have been observed consuming larger males. Younger P. boreus tend to be more willing to use their stingers for both defense and offense as opposed to older scorpions.

=== Reproduction ===
During the birthing process the females assume a stilting position on their rear walking legs. The young, of which there may be 10 to 40, pass through the birth opening covered in a translucent membrane. The young offspring were observed to free themselves from the membrane in 10 to 20 minutes. After freeing themselves from the birth membrane, the offspring will ascend the mother's walking legs and assume a grouped-up position on her dorsum. The young offspring will have their first molt after about 12 days and will then, about a week later, begin to roam around the mothers carapace more freely.

=== Predation ===
Juvenile P. boreus scorpions do not apprehend prey before reaching 13 days. Within the first 13 days of their existence, they feast on the membrane they exited following birth and the remains of their first exoskeleton. Once they begin to move about to a greater extent at 9 to 11 days, female scorpions eat prey without taking cover and juveniles regroup onto the mother's cephalothorax. Young scorpions make their first hunt around 13 to 14 days.

P. boreus scorpions have been observed to prey on grasshoppers, pentatomids, spiders and other scorpions. Once an individual has left its burrow, it may come across prey by chance or through active stalking. It uses Rayleigh waves to aid in prey detection and once a prey has been recognized, it charges it. After reaching its prey, the scorpion seizes it with its pedipalps. It is at this stage that it may sting its prey. A prey that has been stung generally ceases to struggle within 1 minute. Regardless of whether it received paralyzing toxins, the immobilized prey is detained in the pedipalps for a duration of 10 to 30 minutes before being brought to the chelicerae. As it departs the location where the prey was caught, the scorpion transfers it onto its own cephalothorax, with the prey's underside upturned. Unless specimens are accompanied by juveniles, preys are carried to a covered location before being eaten. Feeding duration varies between 2 and 48 hours. The scorpions feed on the head of their prey first and leave the hard exoskeleton as waste. Individuals may go through phases of fasting persisting up to 5 months. The scorpions' predation approach have been observed to be consistent across individuals independently of age and size.

=== Stinger utilization ===
P. boreus stinging behavior varies according to specimen age and the targeted organism. Scorpions aged 13 to 61 days have been observed to sting all prey, likely to maximize their odds of successful feeding and to nurture their evolution to greater size and adulthood. Once they have reached 62 days, individuals begin to leverage their stinging ability only selectively. Stronger pedipalps allow scorpions to successfully capture some varieties of prey without resorting to their stingers. Stinger utilization progressively reduces from 100% in juveniles to 30% once scorpions have reached adulthood. For adult scorpions, stinging is no longer a necessity to prey capture and consumption. After it has become selective, prey stinging occurs in accordance with the degree to which a prey struggles and the type of prey. Hardy prey offering a greater degree of resistance (e. g. grasshoppers) are stung. Captured prey with a softer build (e. g. termites) remain confined to the scorpions' pedipalps until they stop struggling. In the case of P. boreus individuals engaging each other in combat, stinger utilization is elicited without exception.
