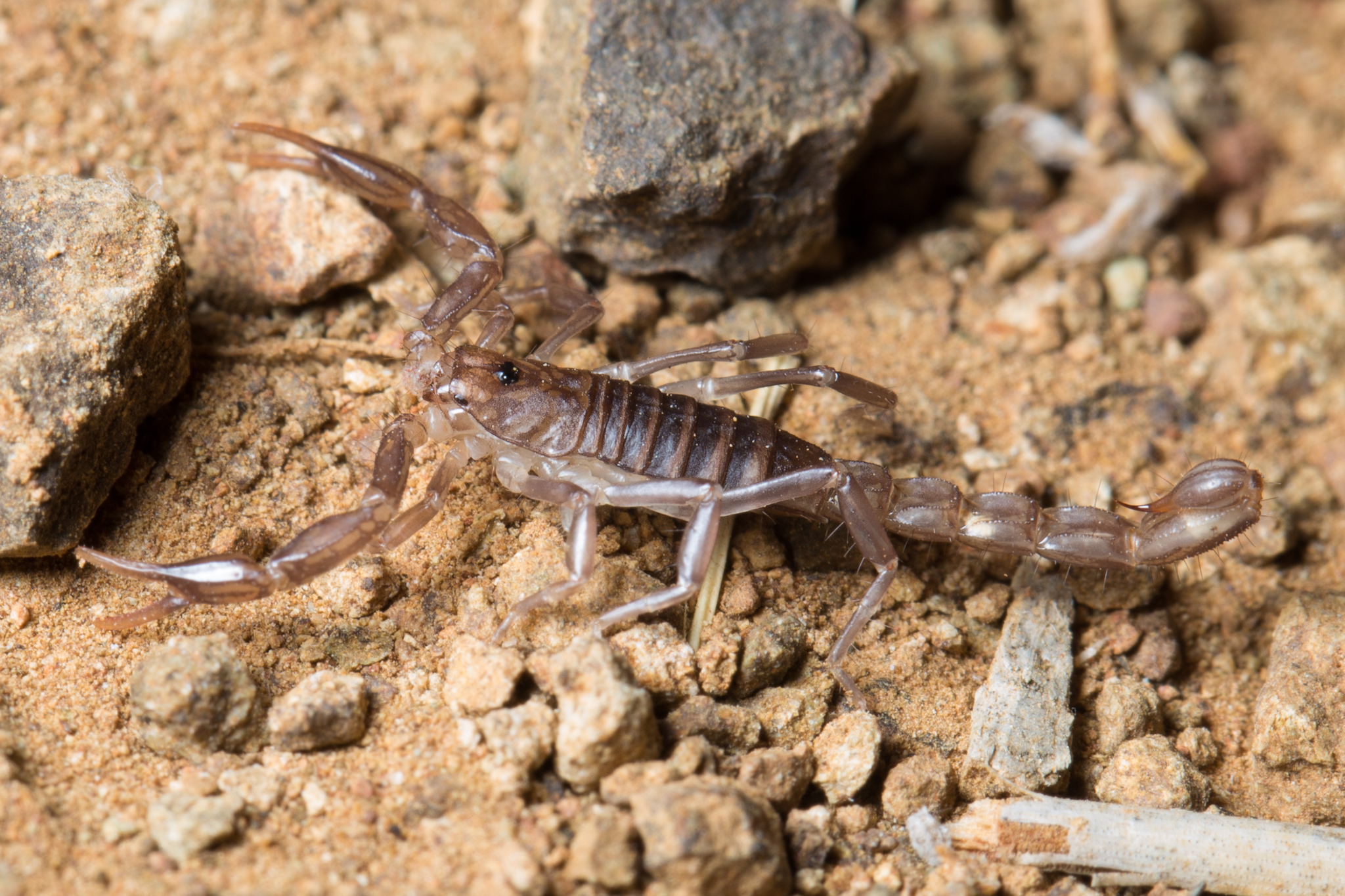
- Serradigitus gertschi, California

Scientific classification
- Domain: Eukaryota
- Kingdom: Animalia
- Phylum: Arthropoda
- Subphylum: Chelicerata
- Class: Arachnida
- Order: Scorpiones
- Family: Vaejovidae
- Genus: Serradigitus
- Species: S. gertschi

Binomial name
- Serradigitus gertschi (Williams, 1968)

= Serradigitus gertschi =

Species of scorpion

Serradigitus gertschi also commonly known as the sawfinger scorpion is a species of scorpion in the family Vaejovidae. The venom has been researched for potential medical applications.

== Distribution ==
California to Texas and southward into the Baja California peninsula and mainland Mexico.

== Subspecies ==
These two subspecies belong to the species Serradigitus gertschi:

- Serradigitus gertschi gertschi
- Serradigitus gertschi striatus
