= Pseudouroctonus maidu =

Scientific classification
- Domain: Eukaryota
- Kingdom: Animalia
- Phylum: Arthropoda
- Subphylum: Chelicerata
- Class: Arachnida
- Order: Scorpiones
- Family: Vaejovidae
- Genus: Pseudouroctonus
- Species: P. maidu

Binomial name
- Pseudouroctonus maidu Savary & Bryson Jr., 2016

Species of scorpion

Pseudouroctonus maidu is a species of scorpion from Northern California in the United States.
