= Paruroctonus baergi =

Scientific classification
- Domain: Eukaryota
- Kingdom: Animalia
- Phylum: Arthropoda
- Subphylum: Chelicerata
- Class: Arachnida
- Order: Scorpiones
- Family: Vaejovidae
- Genus: Paruroctonus
- Species: P. baergi

Binomial name
- Paruroctonus baergi Williams and Hadley, 1967

Species of scorpion

Paruroctonus baergi, commonly known as the sand swimmer scorpion, is a species of scorpion in the family Vaejovidae. It is known from the southern Mojave Desert to Puerto Peñasco.
