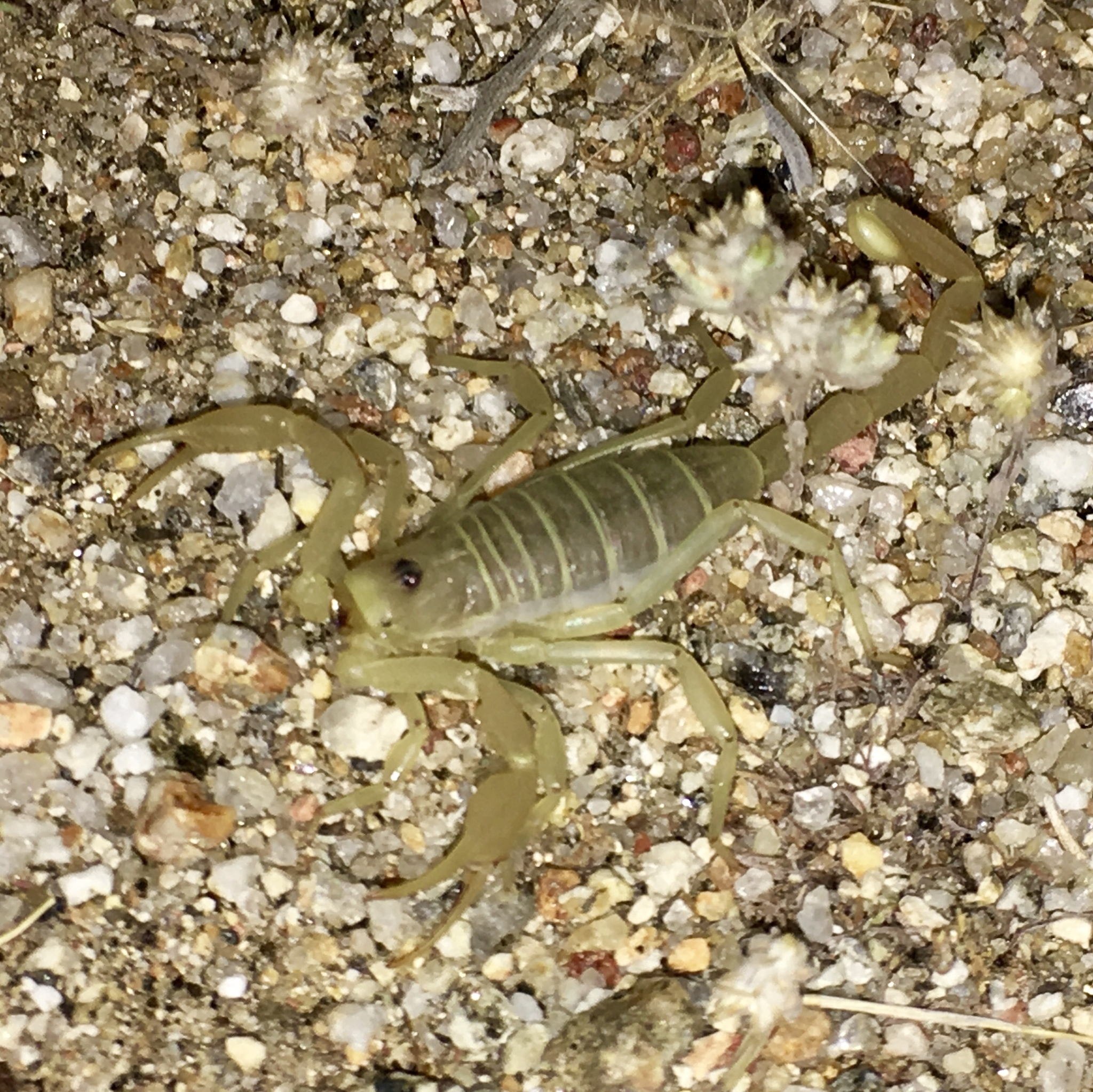

Scientific classification
- Kingdom: Animalia
- Phylum: Arthropoda
- Subphylum: Chelicerata
- Class: Arachnida
- Order: Scorpiones
- Family: Vaejovidae
- Genus: Smeringurus
- Species: S. mesaensis

Binomial name
- Smeringurus mesaensis (Stahnke, 1957)

= Dune scorpion =

Species of scorpion

Smeringurus mesaensis, also known as the dune scorpion or giant sand scorpion, is a species of scorpion in the family Vaejovidae. It is common in the deserts of the southwestern United States.

== Description ==
The dune scorpion is approximately 72 mm in length and 2.0 g in mass.

== Behaviour and ecology ==
Smeringurus mesaensis is fossorial and solitary, though young will aggregate shortly after dispersing from their mother. Females of this species are typically larger than males, with males traveling to find females during mating season. They are nocturnal creatures, active between 9 p.m. and 3 a.m., accounting for their daytime invisibility.
