= Kovarikia =

Scientific classification
- Kingdom: Animalia
- Phylum: Arthropoda
- Subphylum: Chelicerata
- Class: Arachnida
- Order: Scorpiones
- Family: Vaejovidae
- Genus: Kovarikia; Soleglad, Fet & Graham, 2014

Diversity
- About 3 species

Synonyms
- Pseudouroctonus

Genus of scorpions

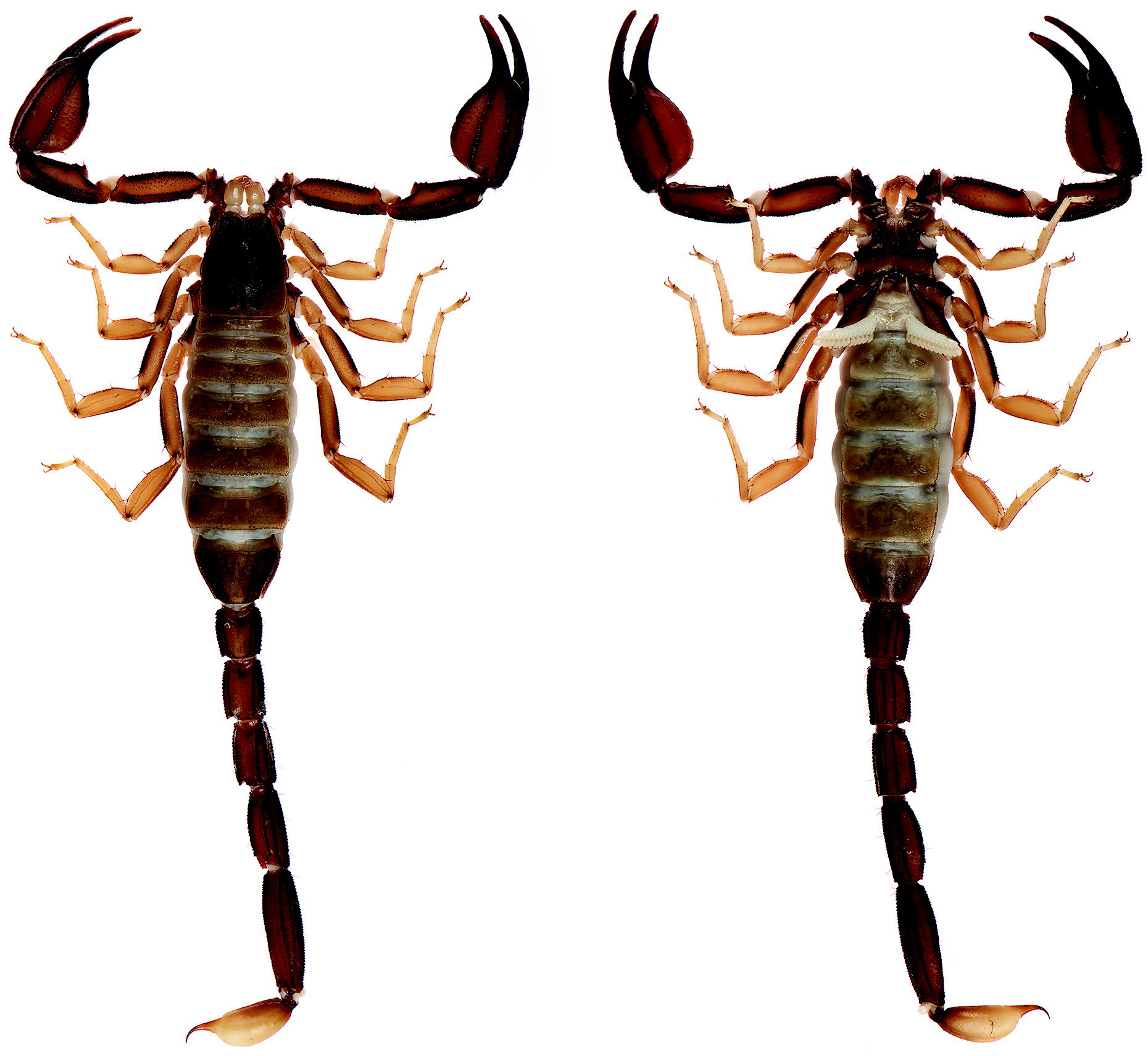
Kovarikia savaryi

Kovarikia, is a genus of scorpion belonging to the family Scorpionidae. Three species have been identified, all of which are restricted to humid rocky microhabitats of southern California.

Major identification is from unique neobothriotaxy found on the ventral surface of the pedipalp chelae. A secondary lamellar hook found on the hemispermatophore. The mating plug barb is crescent shaped.

== Species ==
- Kovarikia angelena (Gertsch & Soleglad, 1972)
- Kovarikia bogerti (Gertsch & Soleglad, 1972)
- Kovarikia williamsi (Gertsch & Soleglad, 1972)
