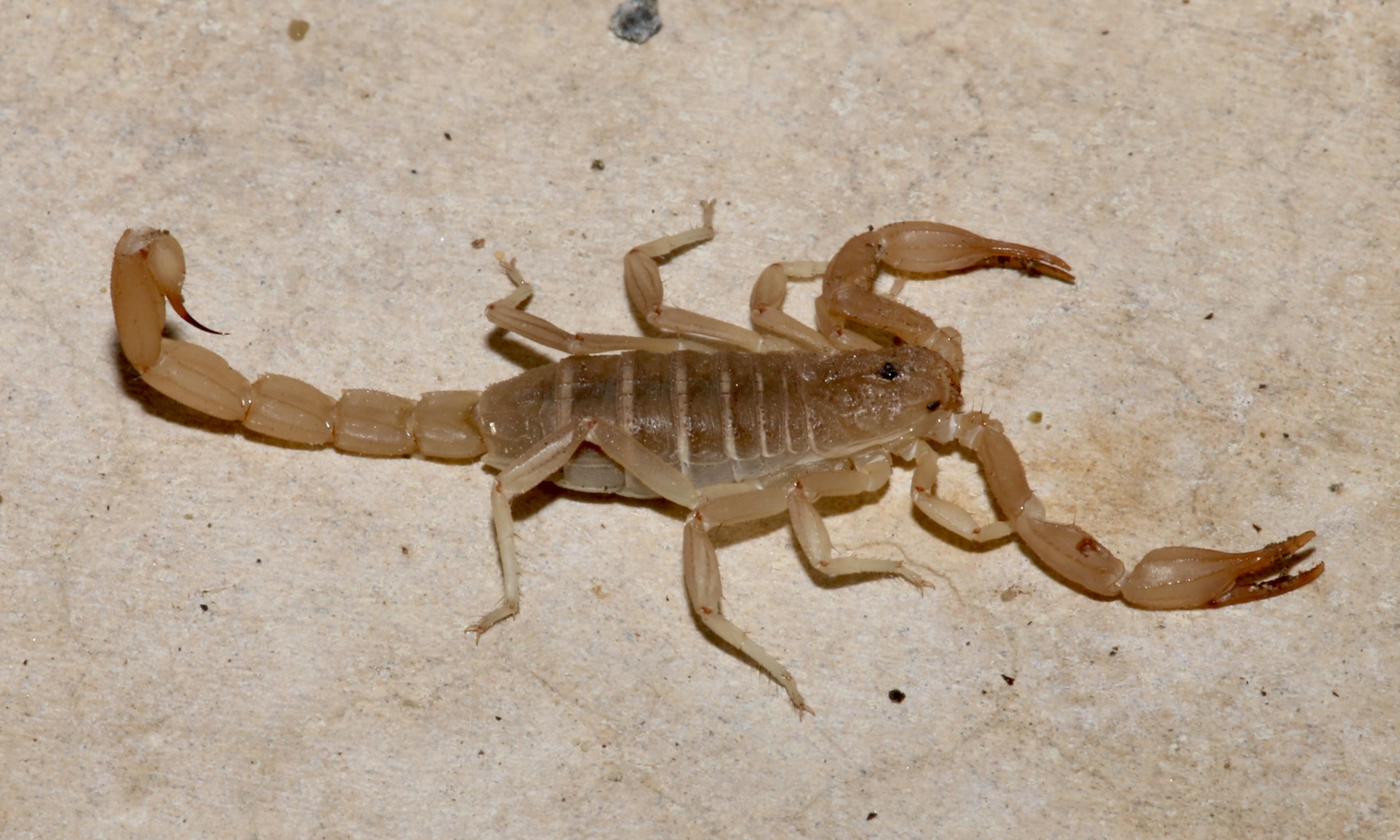
- Kochius punctipalpi, Baja California Sur, 2015

Scientific classification
- Kingdom: Animalia
- Phylum: Arthropoda
- Subphylum: Chelicerata
- Class: Arachnida
- Order: Scorpiones
- Family: Vaejovidae
- Subfamily: Syntropinae
- Genus: Kochius; Soleglad & Fet, 2008

Species
- See text

= Kochius =

Genus of scorpions

Kochius is a genus of scorpions. Kochius scorpions are found in southwestern North America. The genus was first described in 2008 by Michael E. Soleglad and Victor Fet.

== Taxonomy ==
Kochius contains the following species:

- Kochius barbatus (Williams, 1971)
- Kochius bruneus (Williams, 1970)
- Kochius cerralvensis (Williams, 1971)
- Kochius colluvius Ayrey, Jones & Myers, 2019
- Kochius hirsuticauda (Banks, 1910)
- Kochius insularis (Williams, 1970)
- Kochius magdalensis (Williams, 1971)
- Kochius punctipalpi (Wood, 1863)
- Kochius sonorae (Williams, 1971)
- Kochius villosus (Williams, 1971)
