= Ammobaenetes =

Scientific classification
- Domain: Eukaryota
- Kingdom: Animalia
- Phylum: Arthropoda
- Class: Insecta
- Order: Orthoptera
- Suborder: Ensifera
- Family: Rhaphidophoridae
- Subfamily: Ceuthophilinae
- Genus: Ammobaenetes; Hubbell, 1936

Genus of cricket-like animals

Ammobaenetes is a genus of sand-treader crickets in the family Rhaphidophoridae. There are at least three described species in Ammobaenetes.

== Species ==
These three species belong to the genus Ammobaenetes:

- Ammobaenetes arenicolus Strohecker, 1947 (white sand-treader cricket)
- Ammobaenetes lariversi Strohecker, 1944 (Nevada sand-treader cricket)
- Ammobaenetes phrixocnemoides (Caudell, 1907) (mesilla sand-treader cricket)
