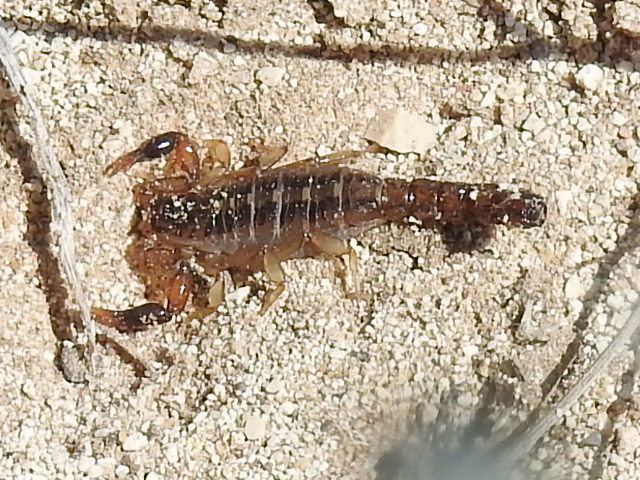
- Maaykuyak waueri

Scientific classification
- Domain: Eukaryota
- Kingdom: Animalia
- Phylum: Arthropoda
- Subphylum: Chelicerata
- Class: Arachnida
- Order: Scorpiones
- Family: Vaejovidae
- Genus: Maaykuyak; González-Santillán & Prendini, 2013

= Maaykuyak =

Genus of Vaejovidae scorpions

Maaykuyak is a genus of scorpions in the family Vaejovidae, found in Mexico and the United States (Texas).

== Species ==
Currently accepted species include:

- Maaykuyak vittatus (Williams, 1970)
- Maaykuyak waueri (Gertsch & Soleglad, 1972)
