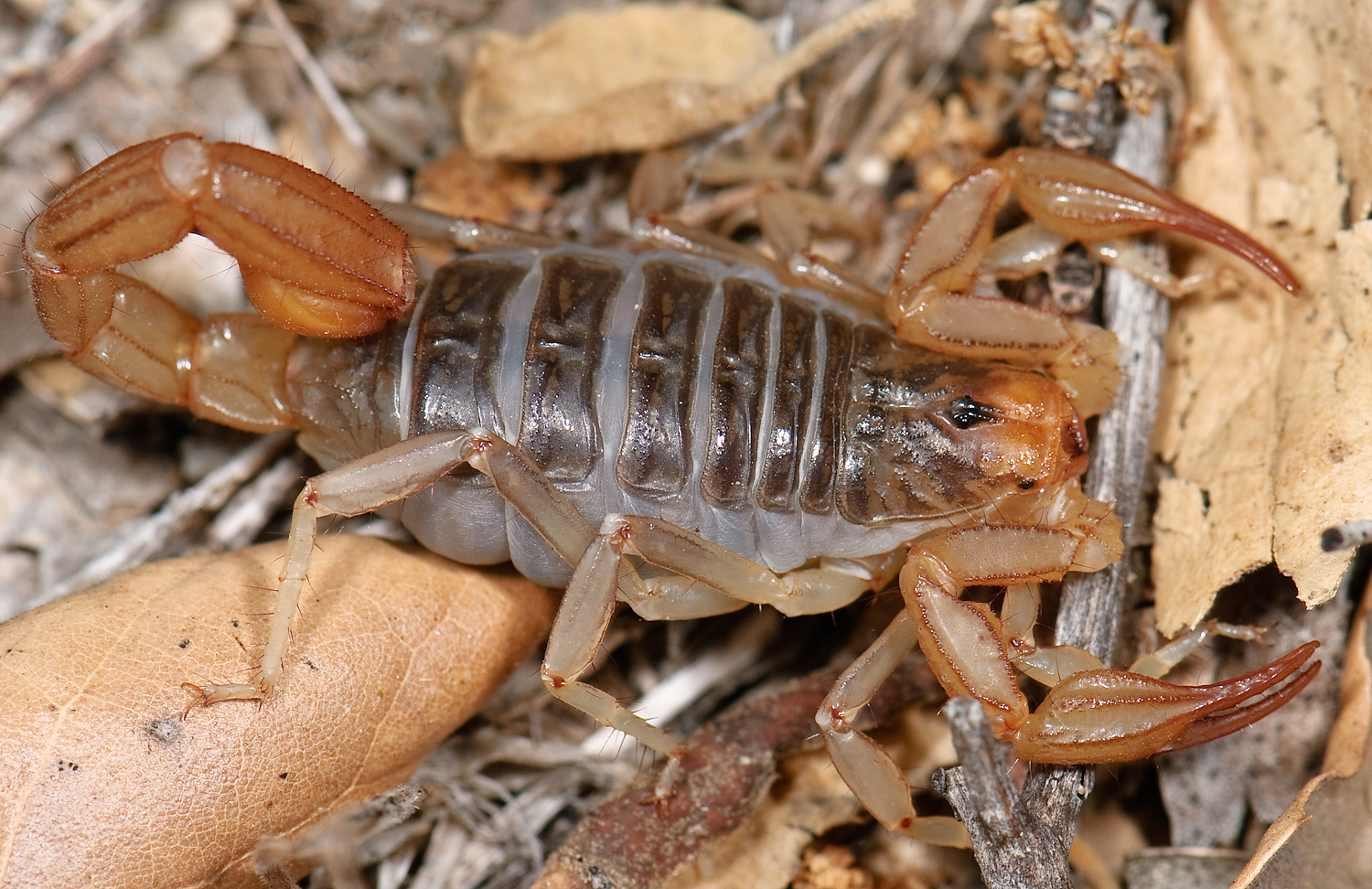

Scientific classification
- Domain: Eukaryota
- Kingdom: Animalia
- Phylum: Arthropoda
- Subphylum: Chelicerata
- Class: Arachnida
- Order: Scorpiones
- Family: Vaejovidae
- Genus: Paruroctonus
- Species: P. silvestrii

Binomial name
- Paruroctonus silvestrii (Borelli, 1909)

= Paruroctonus silvestrii =

Species of scorpion

Paruroctonus silvestrii, also known as the California common scorpion and the stripe-tailed scorpion, is a species of scorpion in the family Vaejovidae. This species is native to the coastal region of the Californias. The stripe-tailed scorpion can be found in dry areas, where it creates and dwells in burrows.

Most individuals are somewhat less than 45 mm (1.8 in) long. It has skinny pinchers, and is generally "mottled dark gray-brown". The name stripe-tailed scorpion is because it has four longitudinal brown lines on the ventral side of the tail.
