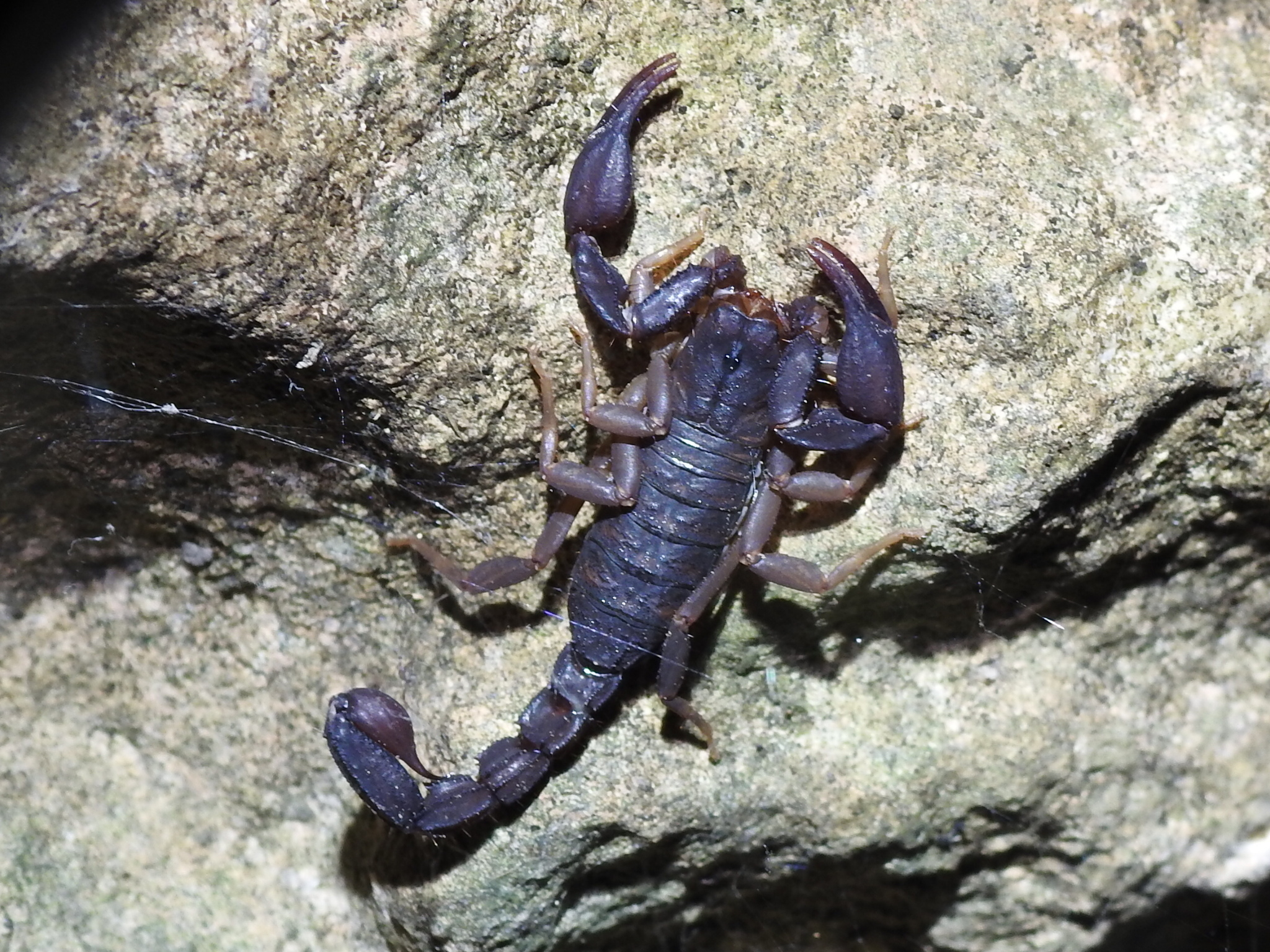
- Pseudouroctonus reddelli, Travis County, Texas, 2023

Scientific classification
- Domain: Eukaryota
- Kingdom: Animalia
- Phylum: Arthropoda
- Subphylum: Chelicerata
- Class: Arachnida
- Order: Scorpiones
- Family: Vaejovidae
- Genus: Pseudouroctonus; Stahnke, 1974

= Pseudouroctonus =

Genus of scorpions

Pseudouroctonus is a genus of scorpions found in the drylands and mountains of western North America. This genus was first named by H. L. Stahnke in 1974. Several species were added by S. A. Stockwell in 1992.

== Taxonomy ==
Pseudouroctonus contains the following species:

- Pseudouroctonus andreas
- Pseudouroctonus apacheanus
- Pseudouroctonus bogerti
- Pseudouroctonus brysoni
- Pseudouroctonus cazieri
- Pseudouroctonus chicano
- Pseudouroctonus iviei
- Pseudouroctonus glimmei
- Pseudouroctonus kremani
- Pseudouroctonus lindsayi
- Pseudouroctonus maidu
- Pseudouroctonus minimus
- Pseudouroctonus montcazieri
- Pseudouroctonus moyeri
- Pseudouroctonus peccatum
- Pseudouroctonus reddelli
- Pseudouroctonus rufulus
- Pseudouroctonus saavasi
- Pseudouroctonus santarita
- Pseudouroctonus sprousei
- Pseudouroctonus williamsi
