= Ammobaenetes lariversi =

Scientific classification
- Domain: Eukaryota
- Kingdom: Animalia
- Phylum: Arthropoda
- Class: Insecta
- Order: Orthoptera
- Suborder: Ensifera
- Family: Rhaphidophoridae
- Subfamily: Ceuthophilinae
- Genus: Ammobaenetes
- Species: A. lariversi

Binomial name
- Ammobaenetes lariversi Strohecker, 1944

Species of cricket-like animal

Ammobaenetes lariversi, the Nevada sand-treader cricket, is a species of camel cricket in the family Rhaphidophoridae. It is found in North America.
