= Lesser stripetail scorpion =

Scientific classification
- Domain: Eukaryota
- Kingdom: Animalia
- Phylum: Arthropoda
- Subphylum: Chelicerata
- Class: Arachnida
- Order: Scorpiones
- Family: Vaejovidae
- Genus: Chihuahuanus
- Species: C. coahuilae

Binomial name
- Chihuahuanus coahuilae (Williams, 1968)

Synonyms
- Hoffmannius coahuilae; Vaejovis coahuilae

Species of scorpion

The lesser stripetail scorpion (Chihuahuanus coahuilae) is a small (35-55mm) species of scorpion found in Mexico and the southwestern United States.

== Description ==
Males grow to about 35 millimetres (1.4 in). Females grow 40–45 millimetres (1.6–1.8 in), but rarely as large as 55 millimetres (2.2 in).

== Distribution and habitat ==
The lesser stripetail scorpion is generally found in Mexico and the U.S. states of Arizona, New Mexico and Texas.

It lives in a variety of habitats and elevations, from desert flats to rolling grasslands to rocky slopes in mountains to about 7,000 feet (2,100 m) or more. Because it is primarily a burrowing species, they are most easily found by using a black light and can be found under rocks and debris.

== Ecology and behavior ==
This scorpion uses a flick as its mode of defense, but they will occasionally stand their ground with a defensive posture. The sting is very painful. Sensitivity and pain can last from 15 to 30 minutes or occasionally longer, with no real medical side effects. Minor swelling and edema can be experienced during that time period depending on severity of sting.
