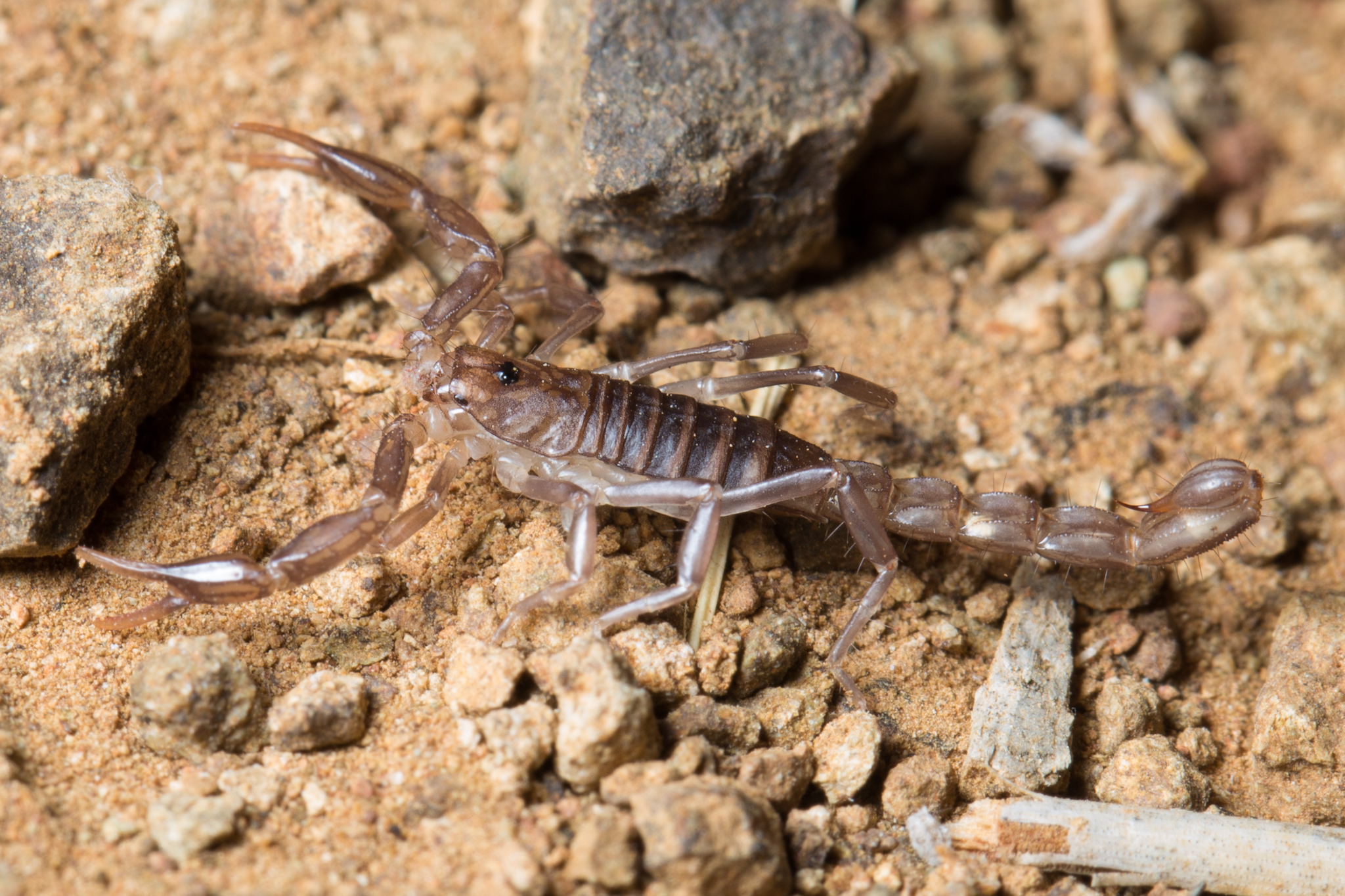
- Serradigitus gertschi, California

Scientific classification
- Domain: Eukaryota
- Kingdom: Animalia
- Phylum: Arthropoda
- Subphylum: Chelicerata
- Class: Arachnida
- Order: Scorpiones
- Family: Vaejovidae
- Genus: Serradigitus; Stahnke, 1974

= Serradigitus =

Genus of scorpions

Serradigitus is a genus of sawfinger scorpions in the family Vaejovidae. There are more than 20 described species in Serradigitus.

== Species ==
These 25 species belong to the genus Serradigitus:

- Serradigitus adcocki (Williams, 1980)
- Serradigitus agilis Sissom & Stockwell, 1991
- Serradigitus allredi
- Serradigitus armadentis (Williams, 1980)
- Serradigitus baueri (Gertsch, 1958)
- Serradigitus bechteli (Williams, 1980)
- Serradigitus calidus (Soleglad, 1974)
- Serradigitus dwyeri (Williams, 1980)
- Serradigitus gertschi (Williams, 1968)
- Serradigitus gigantaensis (Williams, 1980)
- Serradigitus gramenestris (Williams, 1970)
- Serradigitus haradoni (Williams, 1980)
- Serradigitus harbisoni
- Serradigitus hearnei (Williams, 1980)
- Serradigitus joshuaensis (Soleglad, 1972)
- Serradigitus littoralis (Williams, 1980)
- Serradigitus minutis (Williams, 1970)
- Serradigitus minutus (Williams, 1970)
- Serradigitus miscionei Ayrey, 2011
- Serradigitus pacificus (Williams, 1980)
- Serradigitus polisi
- Serradigitus subtilimanus
- Serradigitus torridus Williams & Berke, 1986
- Serradigitus wupatkiensis (Stahnke, 1940)
- Serradigitus yaqui Sissom & Stockwell, 1991
