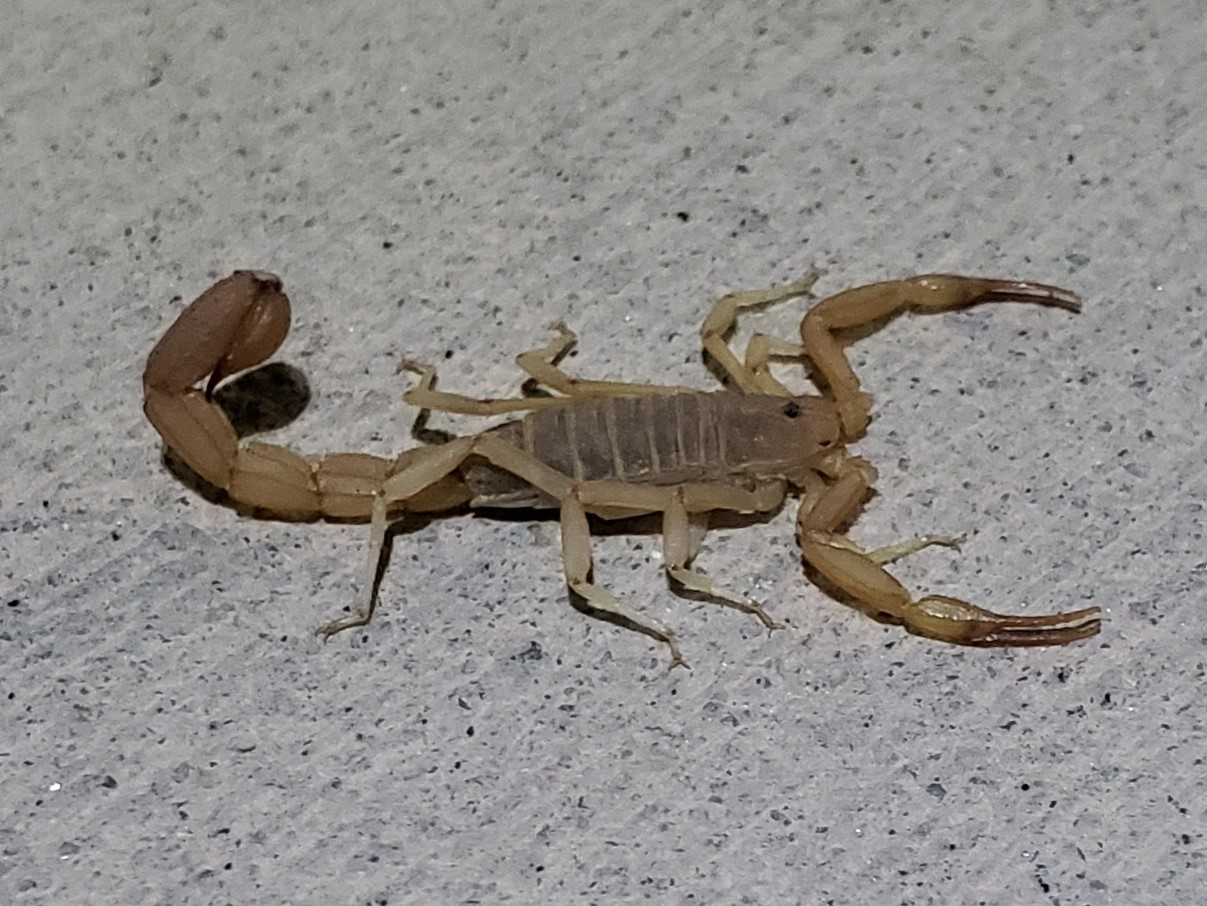
- Paravaejovis waeringi

Scientific classification
- Domain: Eukaryota
- Kingdom: Animalia
- Phylum: Arthropoda
- Subphylum: Chelicerata
- Class: Arachnida
- Order: Scorpiones
- Family: Vaejovidae
- Subfamily: Syntropinae
- Genus: Paravaejovis; Williams, 1980

Synonyms
- Hoffmannius Soleglad & Fet, 2008; Lissovaejovis Ponce Saavedra & Beutelspacher, 2001

= Paravaejovis =

Genus of scorpions

Paravaejovis is a genus of scorpions in the family Vaejovidae. There are about 11 described species in the genus Paravaejovis.

== Species ==
These 11 species belong to the genus Paravaejovis:

- Paravaejovis confusus (Stahnke, 1940)
- Paravaejovis diazi (Williams, 1970)
- Paravaejovis eusthenura (Wood, 1863)
- Paravaejovis galbus (Williams, 1970)
- Paravaejovis gravicaudus (Williams, 1970)
- Paravaejovis hoffmanni (Williams, 1970)
- Paravaejovis pumilis (Williams, 1970)
- Paravaejovis puritanus (Gertsch, 1958)
- Paravaejovis schwenkmeyeri (Williams, 1970)
- Paravaejovis spinigerus (Wood, 1863) (Arizona stripetail scorpion)
- Paravaejovis waeringi (Williams, 1970)
