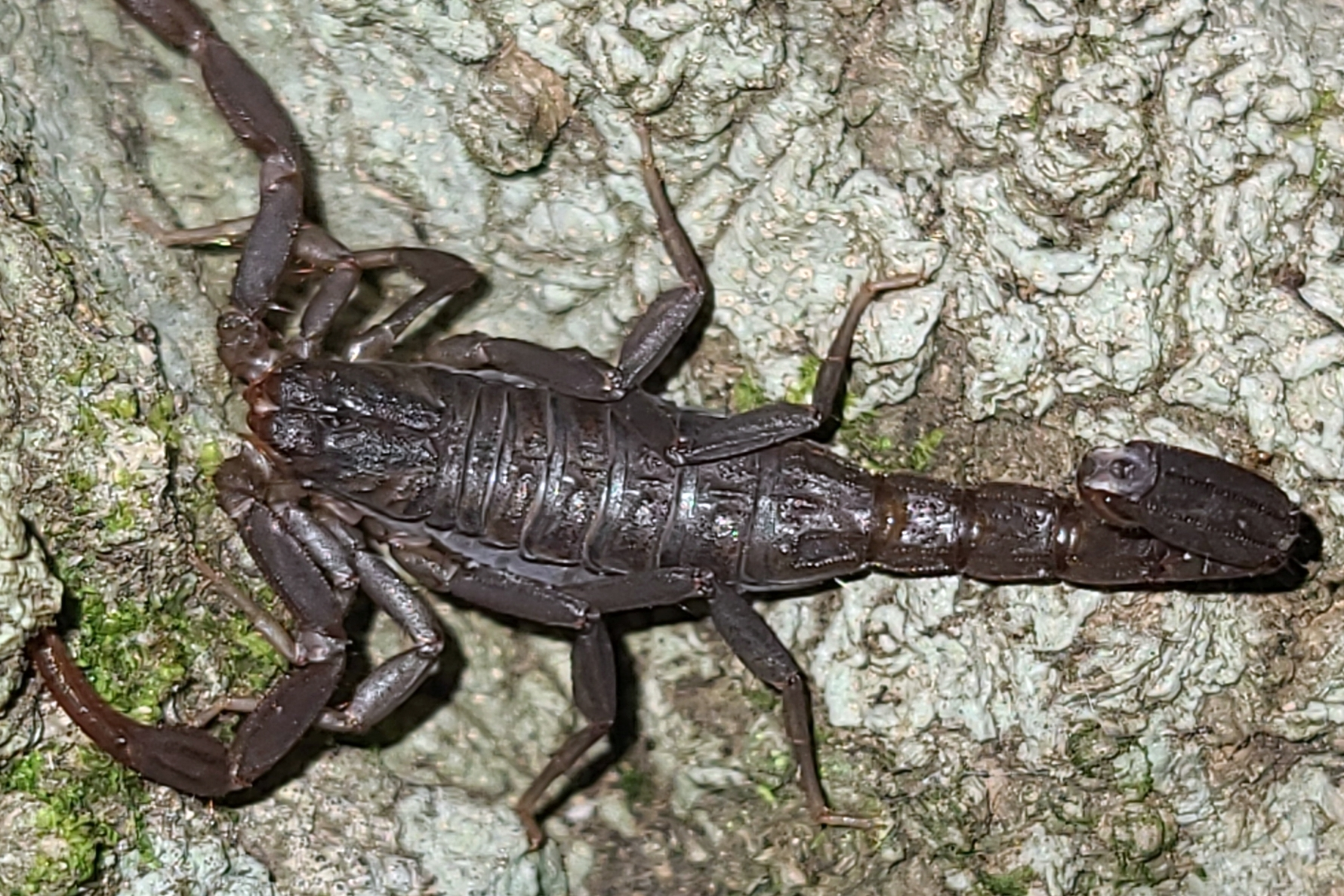

Scientific classification
- Kingdom: Animalia
- Phylum: Arthropoda
- Subphylum: Chelicerata
- Class: Arachnida
- Order: Scorpiones
- Family: Vaejovidae
- Genus: Vaejovis
- Species: V. janssi

Binomial name
- Vaejovis janssi Williams, 1980

= Vaejovis janssi =

Species of scorpion endemic to North America

Vaejovis janssi is a species of scorpion endemic to the Revillagigedo Islands in Mexico.
