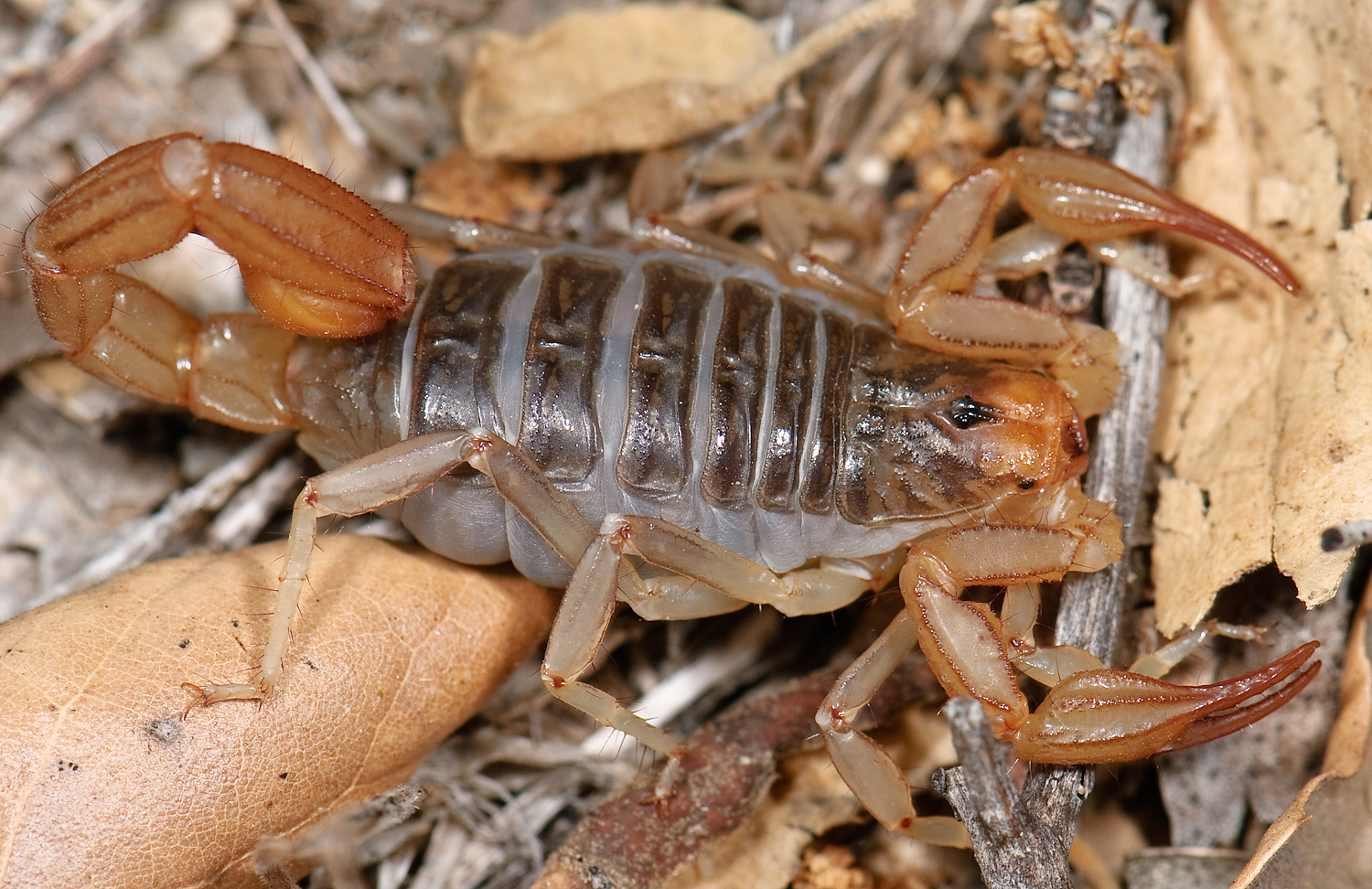
- Paruroctonus silvestrii

Scientific classification
- Domain: Eukaryota
- Kingdom: Animalia
- Phylum: Arthropoda
- Subphylum: Chelicerata
- Class: Arachnida
- Order: Scorpiones
- Family: Vaejovidae
- Genus: Paruroctonus; Werner, 1934

= Paruroctonus =

Genus of scorpions

Paruroctonus is a genus of scorpions in the family Vaejovidae. There are about 30 described species in Paruroctonus.

== Species ==
- Parauroctonus arenicola (Haradon, 1984)
- Paruroctonus baergi (Williams & Hadley, 1967)(Sand Swimmer Scorpion)
- Parauroctonus bantai (Gertsch & Soleglad, 1966)
- Paruroctonus becki (Gertsch & Allred, 1965)
- Paruroctonus boreus (northern scorpion)
- Paruroctonus conclusus Jain, Forbes & Esposito, 2022
- Paruroctonus gracilior (Hoffmann, 1931) (Chihuahuan slender-tailed scorpion)
- Parauroctonus hirsutipes(Williams & Hadley, 1967)
- Paruroctonus luteolus (golden dwarf sand scorpion)
- Parauroctonus marksi (Haradon, 1984)
- Paruroctonus pecos (Sissom & Francke, 1981)
- Parauroctonus shulovi (Williams, 1970)
- Paruroctonus silvestrii (California common scorpion)
- Paruroctonus soda Jain, Forbes & Esposito, 2022
- Paruroctonus tulare Jain et al., 2023
- Paruroctonus utahensis (Williams, 1968) (eastern sand scorpion)
- Paruroctonus variabilis Hjelle, 1982
- Parauroctonus xanthus (Gertsch & Soleglad, 1966)
