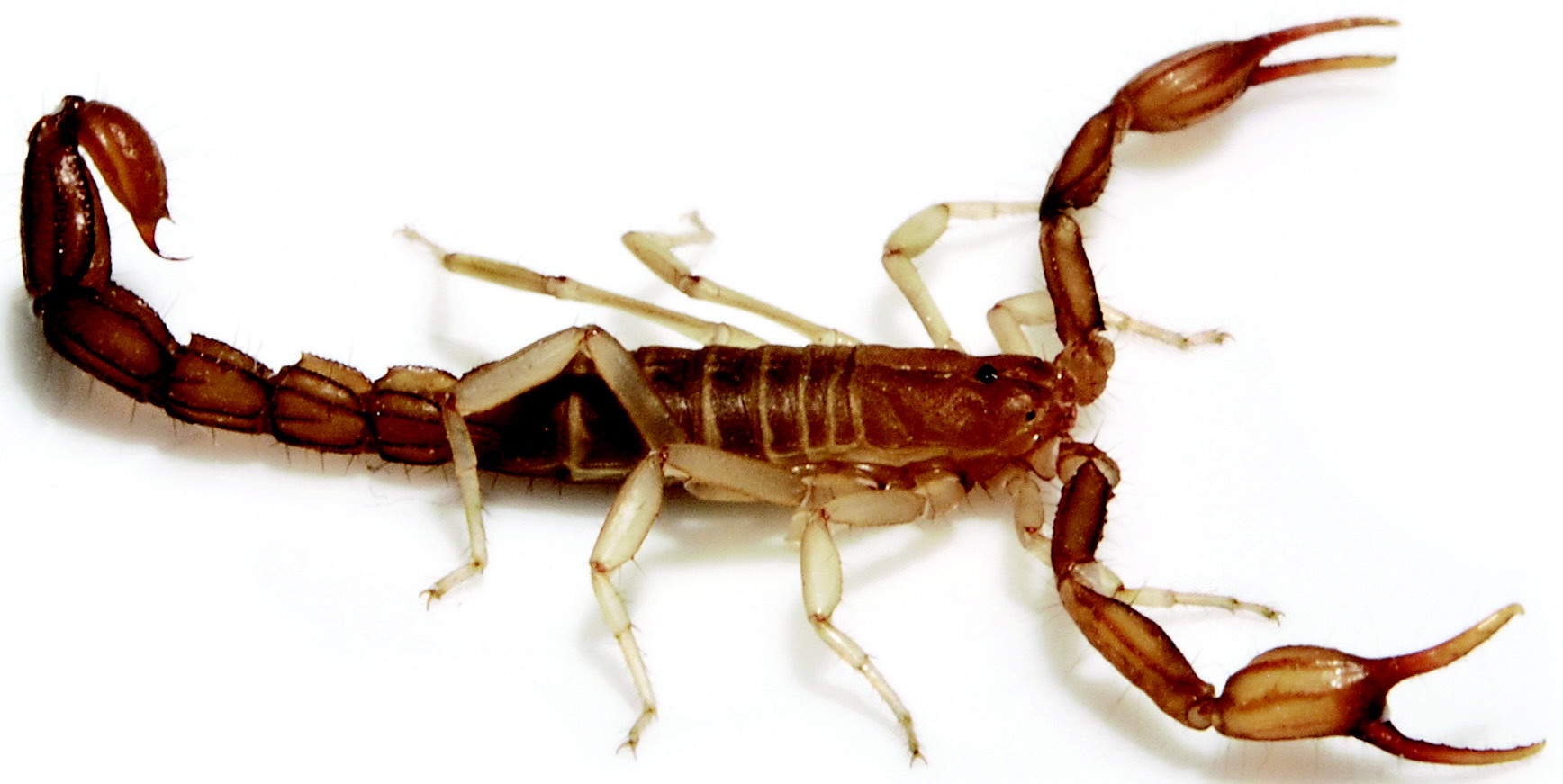
- Male Wernerius inyoensis

Scientific classification
- Domain: Eukaryota
- Kingdom: Animalia
- Phylum: Arthropoda
- Subphylum: Chelicerata
- Class: Arachnida
- Order: Scorpiones
- Family: Vaejovidae
- Genus: Wernerius; Soleglad & Fet, 2008

= Wernerius =

Genus of scorpions

Wernerius is a genus of scorpions.
