= Ammobaenetes phrixocnemoides =

Scientific classification
- Domain: Eukaryota
- Kingdom: Animalia
- Phylum: Arthropoda
- Class: Insecta
- Order: Orthoptera
- Suborder: Ensifera
- Family: Rhaphidophoridae
- Subfamily: Ceuthophilinae
- Genus: Ammobaenetes
- Species: A. phrixocnemoides

Binomial name
- Ammobaenetes phrixocnemoides (Caudell, 1907)

Species of cricket-like animal

Ammobaenetes phrixocnemoides, known generally as the mesilla sand-treader cricket or Caudell's sand-treader cricket, is a species of camel cricket in the family Rhaphidophoridae. It is found in North America.
