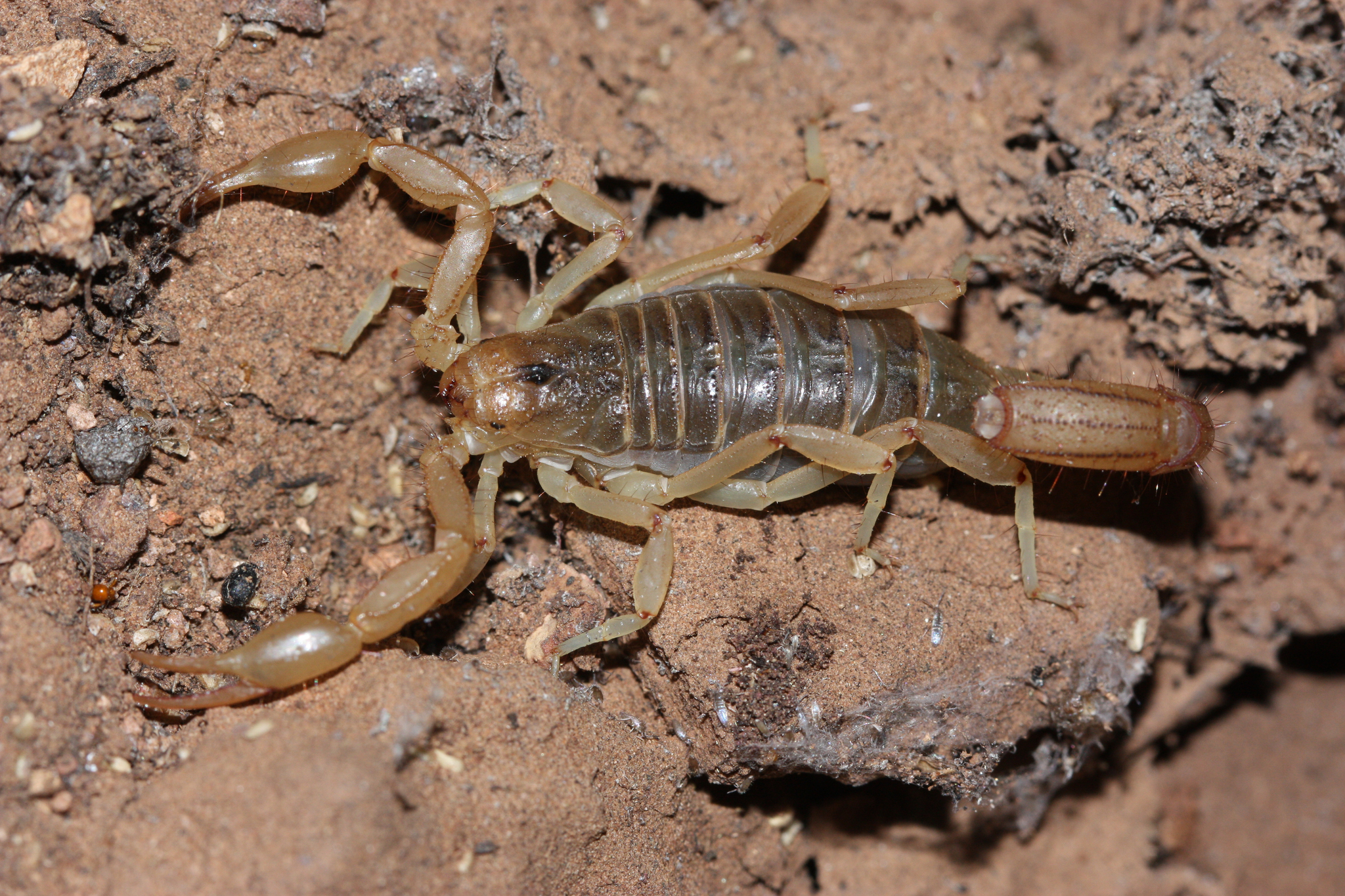

Scientific classification
- Kingdom: Animalia
- Phylum: Arthropoda
- Subphylum: Chelicerata
- Class: Arachnida
- Order: Scorpiones
- Family: Vaejovidae
- Genus: Paravaejovis
- Species: P. spinigerus

Binomial name
- Paravaejovis spinigerus (Wood, 1863)

Synonyms
- Hoffmannius spinigerus; Vaejovis spinigerus

= Paravaejovis spinigerus =

Species of scorpion

Paravaejovis spinigerus, commonly known as the stripe-tailed scorpion or devil scorpion, is a species of scorpion in the family Vaejovidae. It is found in the south-western United States and north-western Mexico.

== Description ==
Paravaejovis spinigerus is a medium-sized scorpion with large adult males and females reaching nearly 60–70 mm, weighing approximately 9.5 g. It can be differentiated from the Arizona bark scorpion (Centruroides sculpturatus) by the brownish-tan stripes on the back of its tail along the keels or ridges; the tail is typically thicker than the hands and pedipalps, both of which are quite slender in the bark scorpions. Some others may have a base color of light yellow/golden brown with variable underlying ducky markings along its tail. The name spinigerus is derived from the spiniform granules at the ends of the dorsal keels of the tail.

Paravaejovis spinigerus was formerly classified in the genus Hoffmannius prior to 2013.

== Distribution and habitat ==
Paravaejovis spinigerus is found in the Sonoran desert of north-western Mexico (Sonora, Baja California, and Baja California Sur) and the south-western United States (Arizona, New Mexico and parts of California), where it is commonly found under rocks and surface objects, such as sleeping bags or shoes, or on sandy soils in a variety of habitats, from desert floor to rocky hillsides. It seeks the most humid areas it can find.

== Ecology ==
=== Diet ===
Like most scorpions, Paravaejovis spinigerus feeds primarily on small invertebrates, including other scorpions, as well as crickets, meal worms and roaches.

=== Predators ===
Pallid bats, "sand-swimmer" snakes, spiders, centipedes, lizards, birds, mammals and other scorpions all prey on Paravaejovis spinigerus.

=== Venom ===
Like all scorpions, Paravaejovis spinigerus is venomous however the venom of this species is not medically significant for humans or other mammals and is not considered dangerous.

=== Reproduction ===
Smell and vibrations are two ways the Paravaejovis spinigerus mate with other scorpions. When a couple find each other, they may display a dance with each other that can take a few minutes to hours. After they are finished dancing with each other, they will go their separate ways. If the male stays dancing longer than the female, the female will then attack him and eat him. The offspring grows inside of the female scorpion and be born alive from her body The females posture is different from any other scorpion during this gestation period, which usually lasts for 3–8 months. Her body will look very inflexible and rigid. Around the time of birth, her front legs will be lowered, allowing the offspring to come out of her body. Some will emerge one at a time with a few minutes apart, others will emerge all at once at a constant flow. Her stiff posture will remain until all of the offspring have left her body. She will care for them and carry them on her back up until they go through the first molting period. "Scorplings" (her offspring) can range anywhere from 1- 100 at a time. Depending on the species and their environmental factors, the mothers will either care for them or eat them. The reason for this behavior is unknown.
