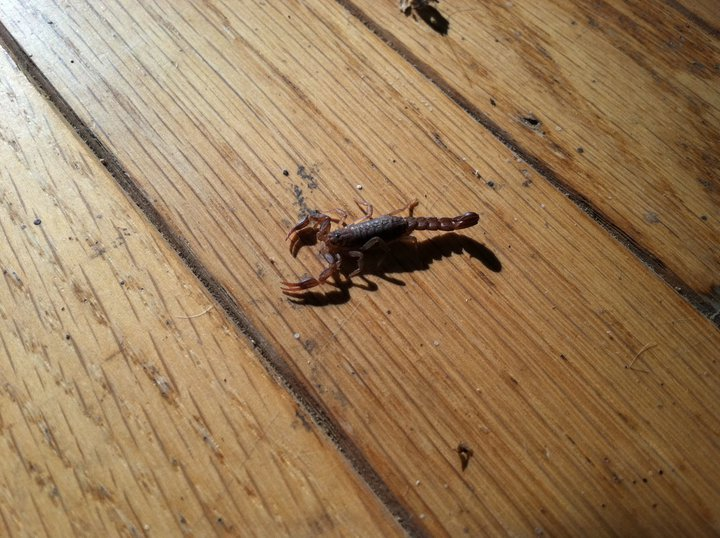
- Vaejovis carolinianus

Scientific classification
- Domain: Eukaryota
- Kingdom: Animalia
- Phylum: Arthropoda
- Subphylum: Chelicerata
- Class: Arachnida
- Order: Scorpiones
- Family: Vaejovidae
- Genus: Vaejovis; Koch, 1836

= Vaejovis =

Genus of scorpions

Vaejovis is a genus of scorpions found from central Mexico to mountains in the southwestern United States in Texas, New Mexico, and Arizona, and one species, Vaejovis carolinianus in the Appalachian region of the southeastern U.S. Many species are among the smallest scorpions in the U.S. with adults in montane species ranging in size from less than an inch (19 mm) to as large as 2.4 inches (60 mm) for the Chihuahuan Desert species, Vaejovis intermedius. As of the end of 2024, there is a total of 75 species with 21 of those occurring in the U.S., with several waiting to be described. Most of the smaller species in the American Southwest are restricted to higher elevations, most commonly in pine forests, in elevations from 5,000-9,500 feet (1500-2900 m). Their venom is relatively weak and are of no medical importance, although stings from larger species can be quite painful.

== Species ==
This is a partial list.

- Vaejovis bandido Graham, Ayrey & Bryson, 2012
- Vaejovis bigelowi Sissom, 2011
- Vaejovis brysoni Ayrey & Webber, 2013 (Currently synonymized under Vaejovis deboerae.)
- Vaejovis carolinianus Beavois, 1855
- Vaejovis cashi Graham, 2007
- Vaejovis crumpi Ayrey & Soleglad, 2011
- Vaejovis deboerae Ayrey, 2009
- Vaejovis electrum Hughes, 2011
- Vaejovis feti Graham, 2007
- Vaejovis franckei Sissom, 1989
- Vaejovis grahami Ayrey & Soleglad, 2014
- Vaejovis grayae Ayrey, 2014
- Vaejovis granulatus Pocock, 1898
- Vaejovis halli Ayrey, 2012
- Vaejovis intermedius Banks, 1910
- Vaejovis islaserrano Barrales-Alcalá et al, 2018
- Vaejovis janssi Williams, 1980
- Vaejovis jonesi Stahnke, 1940
- Vaejovis lapidicola Stahnke, 1940
- Vaejovis mexicanus Kock, 1836
- Vaejovis montanus Graham, 2010
- Vaejovis nayarit Armas & Eliezer Martin, 2001
- Vaejovis pattersoni Williams, 1980
- Vaejovis paysonensis Soleglad, 1973
- Vaejovis tenuipalpus Sissom, Hughes, Bryson & Prendini, 2012
- Vaejovis trinityae Ayrey, 2013
- Vaejovis vorhiesi Stahnke, 1940
