= Alkali sink =

Geography

An alkali sink is a salty basin land form. In these depressions, which are found only in the San Joaquin Valley, California, rainwater drains to the basin and collects in areas where it cannot penetrate the soil due to a hard layer of clay or caliche, producing a pond or lake. When the water evaporates, it leaves behind increasing amounts of salt and minerals in the soil, creating a high pH level in the water and soil.

The term may also refer to a North American desert vegetation type (biome) characteristic of that landform. Plants that tolerate the extreme salt concentrations are known as halophytes. It is generally below the saltbrush scrub vegetation type, which is typified by less salt tolerant species than alkali sink types.

Halophytes that grow in and around alkali sinks:

- Iodine Bush - Allenrolfea occidentalis
- Bush Seepweed / Inkweed - Suaeda moquinii
- Desert Saltgrass - Distichlis spicata
- Alkali Weed - Cressa truxillensis
- Alkali Heath - Frankenia salina
- Parish's Glasswort - Arthrocnemum
- Spikeweed / Tarweed - Centromadia pungens
