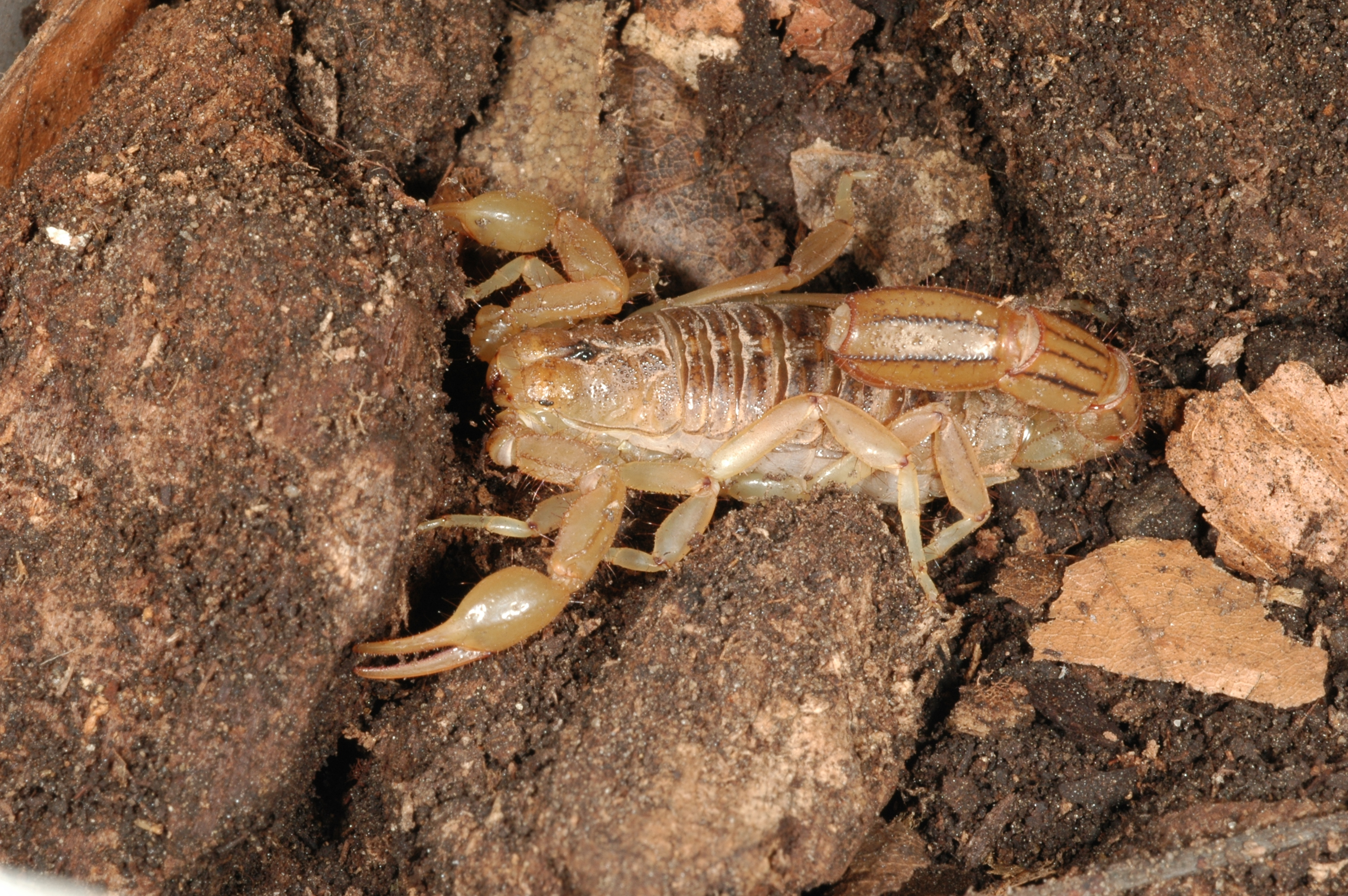
- Paravaejovis spinigerus

Scientific classification
- Kingdom: Animalia
- Phylum: Arthropoda
- Subphylum: Chelicerata
- Class: Arachnida
- Order: Scorpiones
- Superfamily: Chactoidea
- Family: Vaejovidae; Thorell, 1876

= Vaejovidae =

Family of scorpions

Vaejovidae is a family of scorpions, currently comprising 25 genera and over 230 species, found in North America. The species of the family are found from western Guatemala, throughout Mexico, and in the United States, mostly west of the 100° meridian and one species in the Appalachian Mountains. Small, montane species of the genus Vaejovis have been found in pine and spruce forests at elevations over 9,500 feet (2900 m) in New Mexico and Arizona. The northern scorpion, Paruroctonus boreus, is found from northern Arizona to the southern plains of Saskatchewan, Alberta, and British Columbia in Canada and is the northernmost known species of scorpion in the world.

- Balsateres Gonzalez-Santillan & Prendini, 2013
- Catalinia Soleglad, Ayrey, Graham & Fet, 2017
- Chihuahuanus Gonzalez-Santillan & Prendini, 2013
- Franckeus Soleglad & Fet, 2005
- Gertschius Graham & Soleglad, 2007
- Graemeloweus Soleglad, Fet, Graham & Ayrey, 2016
- Kochius Soleglad & Fet, 2008
- Konetontli Gonzalez-Santillan & Prendini, 2013
- Kovarikia Soleglad, Fet & Graham, 2014
- Kuarapu Francke & Ponce-Saavedra, 2010
- Maaykuyak González-Santillán & Prendini, 2013
- Mesomexovis González-Santillán & Prendini, 2013
- Paravaejovis Williams, 1980
- Paruroctonus Werner, 1934
- Pseudouroctonus Stahnke, 1974
- Serradigitus Stahnke, 1974
- Smeringurus Haradon, 1983
- Stahnkeus Soleglad & Fet, 2006
- Syntropis Kraepelin, 1900
- Thorellius Soleglad & Fet, 2008
- Uroctonites Williams & Savary, 1991
- Vaejovis C. L. Koch, 1836
- Vejovoidus Stahnke, 1974
- Vizcaino Gonzalez-Santillan & Prendini, 2013
- Wernerius Soleglad & Fet, 2008
