= Donald S. Coffey =

American medical professor

- Born: October 10, 1932; Bristol, Virginia, U.S.
- Died: November 9, 2017 (aged 85)
- Education: East Tennessee State University; Johns Hopkins University
- Scientific career
- Fields: Cancer Research
- Workplaces: Johns Hopkins University School of Medicine

Donald Straley Coffey (October 10, 1932 – November 9, 2017) was the Catherine Lola and J. Smith Michael distinguished professor of Urology at the Johns Hopkins University School of Medicine and subsequently professor emeritus. He had a primary appointment to urology and secondary appointments to oncology, pharmacology and pathology.

== Early life and education ==
Donald Coffey was born on October 10, 1932, in Bristol, Virginia. After failing 5th and 11th grade, he attended the King College from 1951 to 1953 but was dropped out after 2 years. In 1957, he received a BS in Chemistry from the East Tennessee State University. He received his PhD from Johns Hopkins in 1964 in Physiological Chemistry. He was married to Eula Cosby.

== Career ==
At the ETSU, he worked with the North American Rayon Company in Elizabethton, TN as a chemist. After receiving his BS, he worked as an associate chemical engineer at the Westinghouse Electronic Corporation in Baltimore, MD. After graduation, he was rejected by 23 graduate schools but attended night classes at the Johns Hopkins. There he began working nights at the Brady Urological Research Laboratory in the Johns Hopkins School of Medicine. He quit working at Westinghouse when he became the acting director in 1959. He was then allowed to enroll in a PhD program and studied under Leslie Hellerman in the Department of Biological Chemistry. After failing his comprehensive exam, he was diagnosed with dyslexia.

He was appointed assistant professor to the Department of Pharmacology and Experimental Therapeutics in 1966 and promoted to associate professor in 1970. He was appointed associate professor of Oncology in 1973 and was promoted to full professor in the Department of Pharmacology and Experimental Therapeutics in 1974. In 1975, he was made professor in Urology. From 1969 to 1974, he directed the Brady Laboratory. From 1974 to 2004, he was director of research at the Johns Hopkins.

He helped found the Johns Hopkins University Cancer Center in 1973 with the first director Albert Owens, and took over as director in 1987.

With a $500,000 grant from the Bristol-Myers Squibb, he began collaborating with the Drew Pardoll and Bert Vogelstein on the nuclear matrix where DNA is replicated.

== Awards and recognition ==
- 1984-1988 National Chairman, National Prostatic Cancer Program, National Cancer Institute
- 1988 President, Society for Basic Urological Research
- 1989 Falk Award, National Institute of Environmental Science
- 1992 Eugene Fuller Prostate Award, American Urological Society
- 1994 First Yamanouchi Award, Society of International Urology
- 1997 President of the American Association for Cancer Research
- 2001 Achievement Award, American Urological Association
- 2005 St Paul's Medal, British Association of Urological Surgeons
- 2013 Elected fellow of the AACR Academy
- 2015 Margaret Foti Award for Leadership and Extraordinary Achievements in Cancer Research, AACR

He received 2 NIH MERIT awards.

He served on several scientific advisory and directorial boards:

- 1993-1996 Board of Directors, AACR
- 1997 Board of Directors, National Coalition for Cancer Research, Washington DC
- 2006-2012 National Cancer Advisory Board

The Donald S. Coffey lectureship was established in 1991 by the Society for Basic Urologic Research. It is awarded annually at the spring SBUR meeting to a prominent cancer researcher. Awardees have included Carlo M. Croce, Philip Beachy, Kenneth Pienta, Ronald A. DePinho, William G. Nelson, Charles L. Sawyers, Frank McCormick, Angela Brodie, Peter Jones, John C. Reed, Gerald Cunha, Carol Prives, William R. Fair, Webster Cavenee, Curtis C. Harris, Harold L. Moses, Bert W. O'Malley, and Judah Folkman.
