= Michael Bloomberg =

American businessman and politician (born 1942)

- Bloomberg in 2026

109th Mayor of New York City
- In office January 1, 2002 – December 31, 2013
- First Deputy: Marc Shaw; Patricia Harris
- Preceded by: Rudy Giuliani
- Succeeded by: Bill de Blasio

Personal details
- Born: Michael Rubens Bloomberg; February 14, 1942 (age 84) Boston, Massachusetts, U.S.
- Party: Democratic (before 2001, since 2018); Republican (2001–2007); Independent (2007–2018)
- Spouses: Susan Brown-Meyer (m. 1975; div. 1993) Diana Taylor (m. 2026)
- Children: 2, including Georgina
- Education: Johns Hopkins University (BS); Harvard University (MBA)
- Website: Official website

Michael Rubens Bloomberg (born February 14, 1942) is an American businessman and politician. He is the majority owner and co-founder of Bloomberg L.P., and was its CEO from 1981 to 2001, and again from 2014 to 2023. He served as the 109th mayor of New York City from 2002 to 2013. He was a lifelong Democrat until 2001, when he switched to the Republican Party to run for mayor, and later becoming an independent in 2007. Bloomberg is the most recent mayor of New York City to serve as a Republican or independent. In 2018, he rejoined the Democratic Party, after which he ran an unsuccessful campaign for the 2020 Democratic nomination for president of the United States. Bloomberg is a centibillionaire, worth $109.4 billion as of March 2026, making him the 18th richest person in the world.

Bloomberg grew up in Medford, Massachusetts, and graduated from Johns Hopkins University in Baltimore, Maryland, and Harvard Business School in Boston, Massachusetts. He began his career at the securities brokerage firm Salomon Brothers, before forming his own company in 1981. That company, Bloomberg L.P., is a financial information, software, and media firm that is known for its Bloomberg Terminal. Bloomberg spent the next twenty years as its chairman and CEO. Bloomberg, who has signed the Giving Pledge, has given away $24.5 billion (as of 2025) to philanthropic causes in his lifetime. After a brief stint as a full-time philanthropist, he re-assumed the position of CEO at Bloomberg L.P. by the end of 2014.

Bloomberg was elected the 109th mayor of New York City in 2001. He held office for three consecutive terms, winning re-election in 2005 and 2009. Pursuing socially liberal and fiscally moderate policies, Bloomberg developed a technocratic managerial style.

As the mayor of New York, Bloomberg established public charter schools, rebuilt urban infrastructure, and supported gun control, public health initiatives, and environmental protections. He also led a re-zoning of large areas of the city, which facilitated widespread new commercial and residential construction after the September 11 attacks. Bloomberg is considered to have had far-reaching influence on the politics, business sector, and culture of New York City during his three terms as mayor. He has also faced significant criticism for the city's stop-and-frisk program, support for which he reversed with an apology before his 2020 presidential run.

In November 2019, four months before Super Tuesday, Bloomberg officially launched his campaign for the Democratic nomination for president of the United States in the 2020 election. He ended his campaign in March 2020, after having won only 61 delegates. Bloomberg self-funded $935 million for his candidacy, which set the record for the most expensive presidential primary campaign and highest spending in any political capacity by a single individual in U.S. history. In 2024, Bloomberg received the Presidential Medal of Freedom from President Joe Biden.

== Early life and education ==
Bloomberg was born on February 14, 1942, at St. Elizabeth's Hospital, in the Brighton neighborhood of Boston, to William Henry Bloomberg, a bookkeeper for a dairy company, and Charlotte (née Rubens) Bloomberg. His father never earned more than $6,000 (equivalent to $110,000 in 2026 dollars) a year. William Henry Bloomberg died suddenly when his son was in college. The Bloomberg Center at the Harvard Business School was named in William Henry's honor. Bloomberg's family is Jewish, and he is a member of the Temple Emanu-El in Manhattan. Bloomberg's paternal grandfather, Rabbi Alexander "Elick" Bloomberg, was a Polish Jew. Bloomberg's maternal grandfather, Max Rubens, was a Lithuanian Jewish immigrant from present-day Belarus, and his maternal grandmother was born in New York to Lithuanian Jewish parents.

The family lived in Allston until Bloomberg was two years old, followed by Brookline, Massachusetts, for two years, finally settling in the Boston suburb of Medford, Massachusetts, where he lived until after he graduated from college.

Bloomberg became an Eagle Scout when he was twelve years old. He graduated from Medford High School in 1960. He went on to attend Johns Hopkins University, where he joined the fraternity Phi Kappa Psi. While there, he constructed the blue jay costume for the university's mascot. He graduated in 1964 with a Bachelor of Science in Engineering degree in electrical engineering. In 1966, he graduated from Harvard Business School with a Master of Business Administration (MBA) degree.

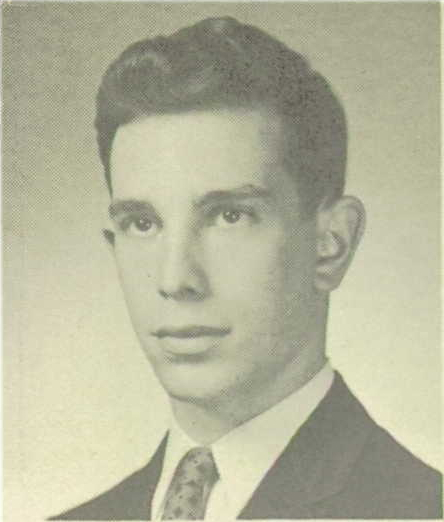
Bloomberg in Medford High School's 1960 yearbook

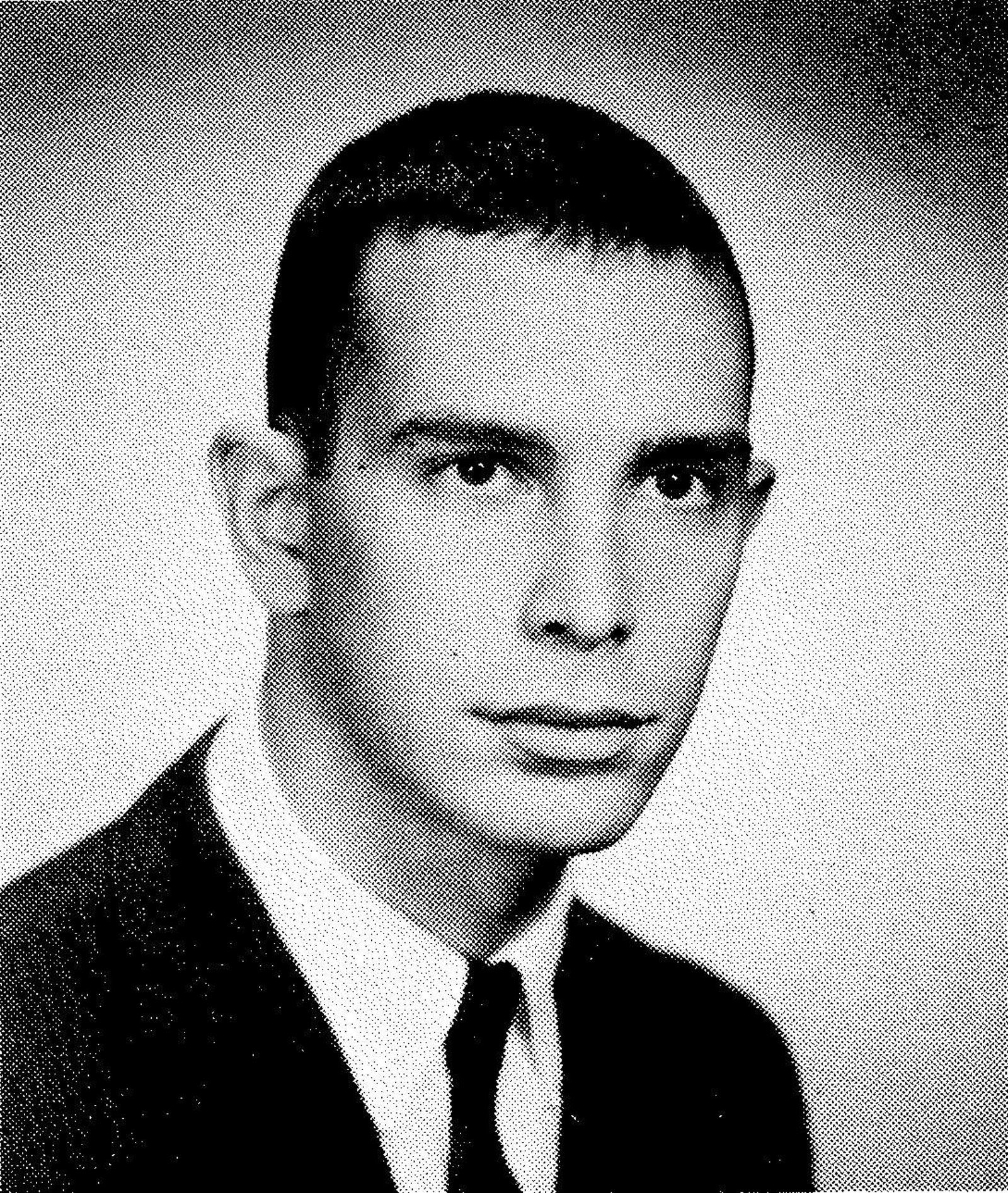
Bloomberg in Johns Hopkins University's 1964 yearbook

Bloomberg is a member of Kappa Beta Phi and Tau Beta Pi. He wrote an autobiography, Bloomberg by Bloomberg, with help from Bloomberg News editor-in-chief Matthew Winkler.

== Business career ==
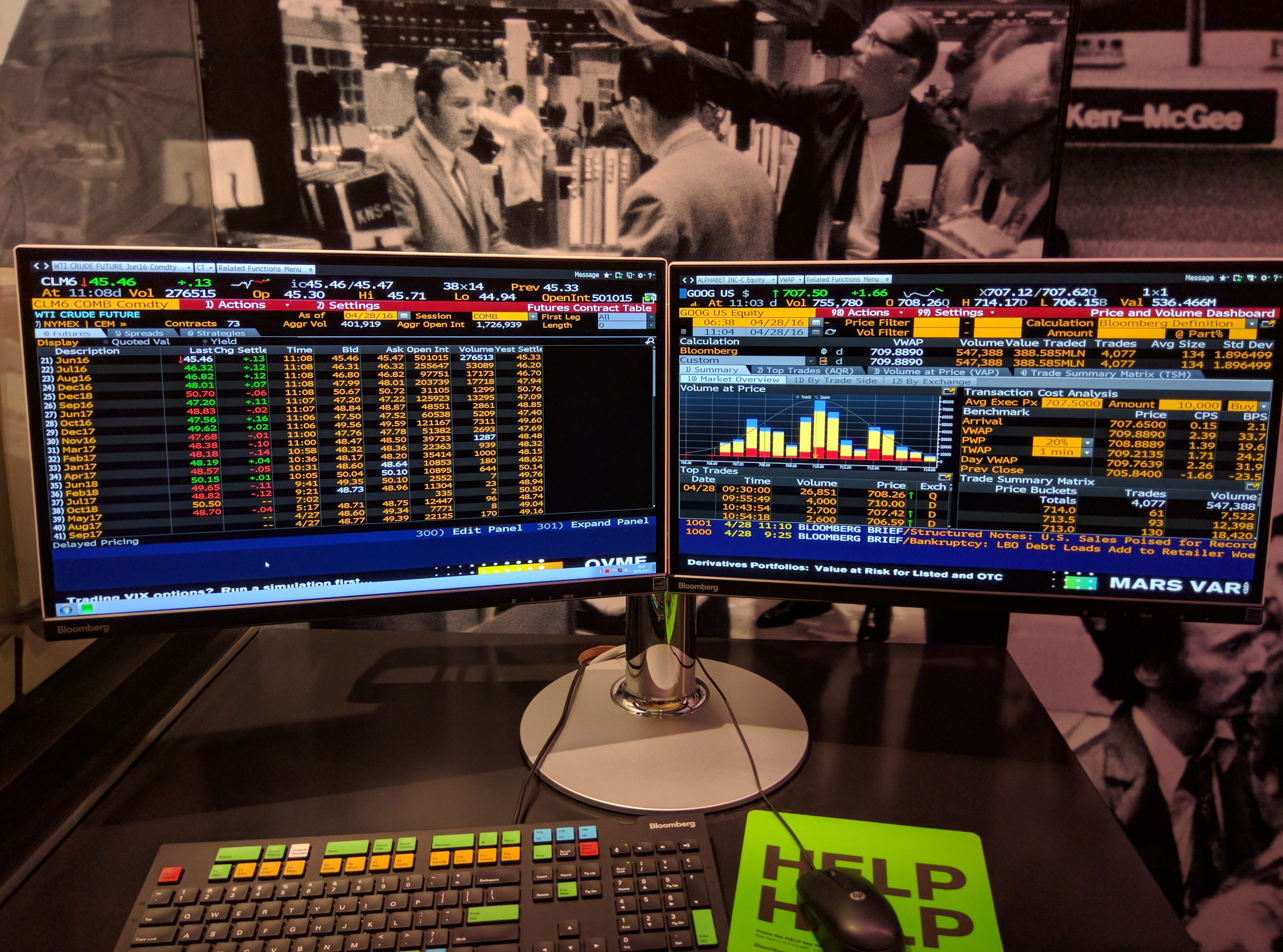
Sample Bloomberg Terminal as displayed at the Computer History Museum's permanent collection

In 1966, Bloomberg was hired for a job earning $9,000 per year at Salomon Brothers, a large Wall Street investment bank. Salomon Brothers later promoted him to the equities desk. Bloomberg became a general partner at Salomon Brothers in 1972; he headed equity trading and, later, systems development. Phibro Corporation bought Salomon Brothers in 1981, and the new management fired Bloomberg, paying him $10 million for his equity in the firm.

Using the money he received from Phibro, Bloomberg—having designed in-house computerized financial systems for Salomon—set up a data services company named Innovative Market Systems (IMS) based on his belief that Wall Street would pay a premium for high-quality business information, delivered instantaneously on computer terminals in a variety of usable formats. The company sold customized computer terminals that delivered real-time market data, financial calculations and other analytics to Wall Street firms. The terminal, first called the Market Master terminal, was released to market in December 1982.

In 1986, IMS renamed itself Bloomberg L.P. Over the years, ancillary products including Bloomberg News, Bloomberg Radio, Bloomberg Message, and Bloomberg Tradebook were launched. Bloomberg, L.P. had revenues of approximately $10 billion in 2018. As of 2019, the company has more than 325,000 terminal subscribers worldwide and employs 20,000 people in dozens of locations.

In the 1980s and 1990s, Bloomberg L.P. was compared to a fraternity, with employees bragging in the company's office about their sexual exploits. The company was sued four times by female employees for sexual harassment, including one incident in which a victim claimed to have been raped. To celebrate Bloomberg's 48th birthday, colleagues published a pamphlet entitled The Portable Bloomberg: The Wit and Wisdom of Michael Bloomberg. Among various sayings that were attributed to him, several have subsequently been criticized as sexist or misogynistic. Among the contents of the 1990 publication are a suggestion that if women wanted to be known for their intelligence, they would spend less time at Bloomingdale's and more at the library; as well as a joke that if Bloomberg terminals could provide oral sex, it would put female employees out of work. Bloomberg's staff told the New York Times that he now regrets having made such "disrespectful" remarks.

When he left the position of CEO to pursue a political career as the mayor of New York City, Bloomberg was replaced by Lex Fenwick and later by Daniel L. Doctoroff, after his initial service as deputy mayor under Bloomberg. After completing his final term as the mayor of New York City, Bloomberg spent his first eight months out of office as a full-time philanthropist. In fall 2014, he announced that he would return to Bloomberg L.P. as CEO at the end of 2014, succeeding Doctoroff, who had led the company since February 2008. Bloomberg resigned as CEO of Bloomberg L.P. to run for president in 2019.

In January 2024, John P. Angelos reached a $1.725 billion deal to sell the Baltimore Orioles to a group led by David Rubenstein. The group included Bloomberg, former Baltimore Mayor Kurt Schmoke, Cal Ripken, New York investment manager Michael Arougheti and NBA legend Grant Hill.

=== Wealth ===
In March 2009, Forbes reported Bloomberg's wealth at $16 billion, a gain of $4.5 billion over the previous year, the world's biggest increase in wealth from 2008 to 2009. Bloomberg moved from 142nd to 17th in the Forbes list of the world's billionaires in only two years. In the 2019 Forbes list of the world's billionaires, he was the ninth-richest person; his net worth was estimated at $55.5 billion. In 2021, Bloomberg's net worth was estimated at $106 billion, ranking him 12th on Forbes' list of billionaires.

== Mayor of New York City ==
=== Mayoral elections ===
==== 2001 election ====
In 2001, New York's Republican mayor Rudy Giuliani, was ineligible for re-election due to the city's limit of two consecutive terms. Bloomberg, who had been a lifelong member of the Democratic Party, decided to run for mayor on the Republican ticket. Voting in the primary began on the morning of September 11, 2001. The primary was postponed later that day, due to the September 11 attacks. In the rescheduled primary, Bloomberg defeated Herman Badillo, a former Democratic congressman, to become the Republican nominee. After a runoff, the Democratic nomination went to New York City Public Advocate Mark Green.

Bloomberg received Giuliani's endorsement to succeed him in the 2001 election. He also had a huge campaign spending advantage. Although New York City's campaign finance law restricts the total amount of contributions that a candidate can accept, Bloomberg chose not to use public funds and therefore his campaign was not subject to these restrictions. He spent $73 million of his own money on his campaign, outspending Green by a ratio of five to one.

In the wake of the September 11 attacks, Bloomberg's administration made a successful bid to host the 2004 Republican National Convention. The convention drew thousands of protesters, among them New Yorkers against George W. Bush and the Bush administration's pursuit of the Iraq War.

==== 2005 election ====
Bloomberg was re-elected mayor in November 2005 by a margin of 20 percent, the widest margin ever for a Republican mayor of New York City. He spent almost $78 million on his campaign, exceeding the record of $74 million he spent on the previous election. In late 2004 or early 2005, Bloomberg gave the Independence Party of New York $250,000 to fund a phone bank seeking to recruit volunteers for his re-election campaign.

Former Bronx Borough President Fernando Ferrer won the Democratic nomination to oppose Bloomberg in the general election. Thomas Ognibene sought to run against Bloomberg in the Republican Party's primary election. The Bloomberg campaign successfully challenged the signatures Ognibene submitted to the Board of Elections to prevent Ognibene from appearing on ballots for the Republican primary.

Bloomberg opposed the confirmation of John Roberts as Chief Justice of the United States. Bloomberg is a staunch supporter of abortion rights, and did not believe that Roberts was committed to maintaining Roe v. Wade. In addition to Republican support, Bloomberg obtained the endorsements of several prominent Democrats: former Democratic mayor Ed Koch; former Democratic governor Hugh Carey; former Democratic City Council Speaker Peter Vallone and Vallone's son, Councilman Peter Vallone Jr.; former Democratic Congressman Floyd Flake (who had previously endorsed Bloomberg in 2001), and Brooklyn Borough President Marty Markowitz.

==== 2009 election ====
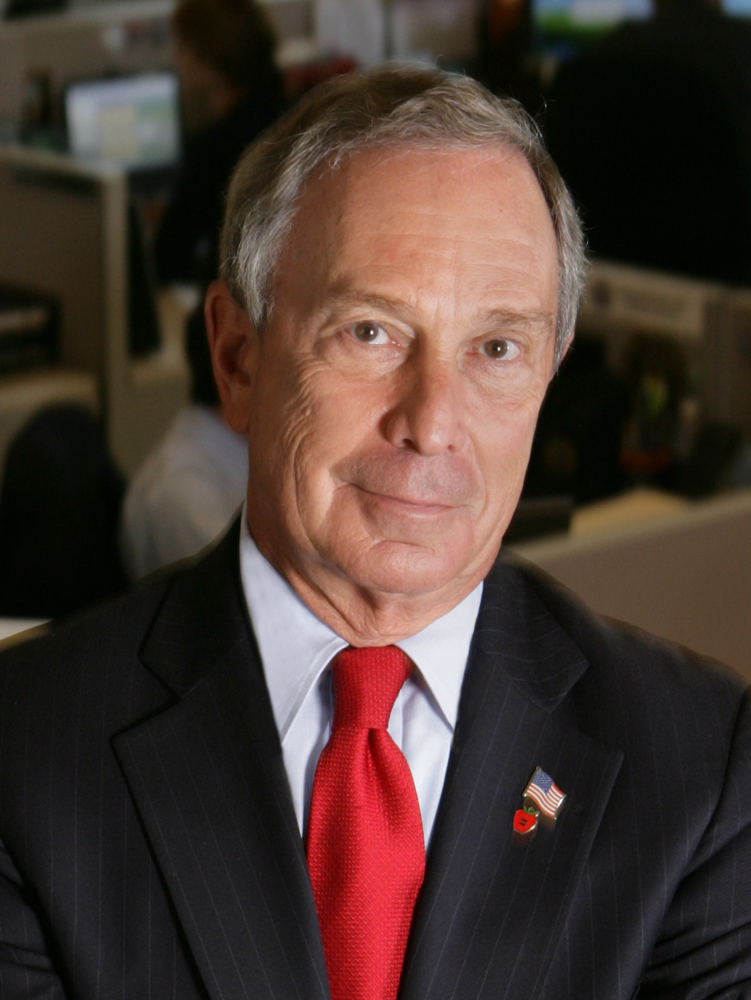
Bloomberg in 2007

On October 2, 2008, Bloomberg announced he would seek to extend the city's term limits law, and run for a third mayoral term in 2009. Bloomberg said, "Handling this financial crisis while strengthening essential services ... is a challenge I want to take on", Bloomberg said at a news conference. "So, should the City Council vote to amend term limits, I plan to ask New Yorkers to look at my record of independent leadership and then decide if I have earned another term."

Ronald Lauder, who campaigned for New York City's term limits in 1993 and spent over 4 million dollars of his own money to limit the maximum years a mayor could serve to eight years, sided with Bloomberg and agreed to stay out of future legality issues. In exchange, he was promised a seat on an influential city board by Bloomberg.

Some people and organizations objected, and NYPIRG filed a complaint with the City Conflict of Interest Board. On October 23, 2008, the city council voted 29–22 in favor of extending the term limit to three consecutive four-year terms. After two days of public hearings, Bloomberg signed the bill into law on November 3.

Bloomberg's bid for a third term generated some controversy. Civil libertarians such as former New York Civil Liberties Union Director Norman Siegel and New York Civil Rights Coalition Executive Director Michael Meyers joined with local politicians to protest the process as undermining the democratic process.

Bloomberg's opponent was Democratic and Working Families Party nominee Bill Thompson, who had been New York City Comptroller for the past eight years and before that, president of the New York City Board of Education. Bloomberg defeated Thompson by a vote of 51 percent to 46 percent. Bloomberg spent $109.2 million on his 2009 campaign, outspending Thompson by a margin of more than 11 to one.

After the release of Independence Party campaign filings in January 2010, it was reported that Bloomberg had made two $600,000 contributions from his personal account to the Independence Party on October 30 and November 2, 2009. The Independence Party then paid $750,000 of that money to Republican Party political operative John Haggerty Jr. This prompted an investigation beginning in February 2010 by the office of New York County District Attorney Cyrus Vance Jr., into possible improprieties. The Independence Party later questioned how Haggerty spent the money, which was to go to poll-watchers. Former New York State Senator Martin Connor contended that because the Bloomberg donations were made to an Independence Party housekeeping account, rather than to an account meant for current campaigns, this was a violation of campaign finance laws. Haggerty also spent money from a separate $200,000 donation from Bloomberg on office space.

==== 2013 election ====
On September 13, 2013, Bloomberg announced that he would not endorse any of the candidates to succeed him. This avoided the possibility of humiliation should any candidate reject his endorsement. The City had grown weary of Bloomberg after twelve years; polls showed he was quite unpopular at the time. Some candidates, de Blasio in particular, had grown accustomed to regularly criticizing the incumbent during campaign events. On his radio show, Bloomberg stated, "I don't want to do anything that complicates it for the next mayor. And that's one of the reasons I've decided I'm just not going to make an endorsement in the race." He added, "I want to make sure that person is ready to succeed, to take what we've done and build on that."

Bloomberg praised The New York Times for its endorsement of Christine Quinn and Joe Lhota as their favorite candidates in the Democratic and Republican primaries, respectively. Quinn came in third in the Democratic primary, and Lhota won the Republican primary. Returning fire from a fierce critic, Bloomberg criticized Democratic mayoral candidate Bill de Blasio's campaign methods, which he initially called "racist"; he was referencing a widely discussed de Blasio commercial which featured the candidate's black wife and mixed race children, in what clearly was an appeal to voters based upon race. Bloomberg later downplayed, and partially retracted, those remarks.

On January 1, 2014, de Blasio became New York City's new mayor, succeeding Bloomberg.

=== Tenure ===
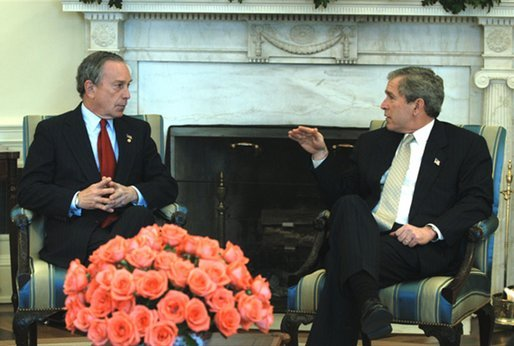
Bloomberg with President George W. Bush in 2003

Bloomberg assumed office as the 109th mayor of New York City on January 1, 2002. He won re-election in 2005, and again in 2009. As mayor, he initially struggled with approval ratings as low as 24 percent, but he subsequently developed, and maintained, high approval ratings. Bloomberg joined Rudy Giuliani, John Lindsay, and Fiorello La Guardia as re-elected Republican mayors in the mostly Democratic city.

Bloomberg stated that he wanted public education reform to be the legacy of his first term, and addressing poverty to be the legacy of his second.

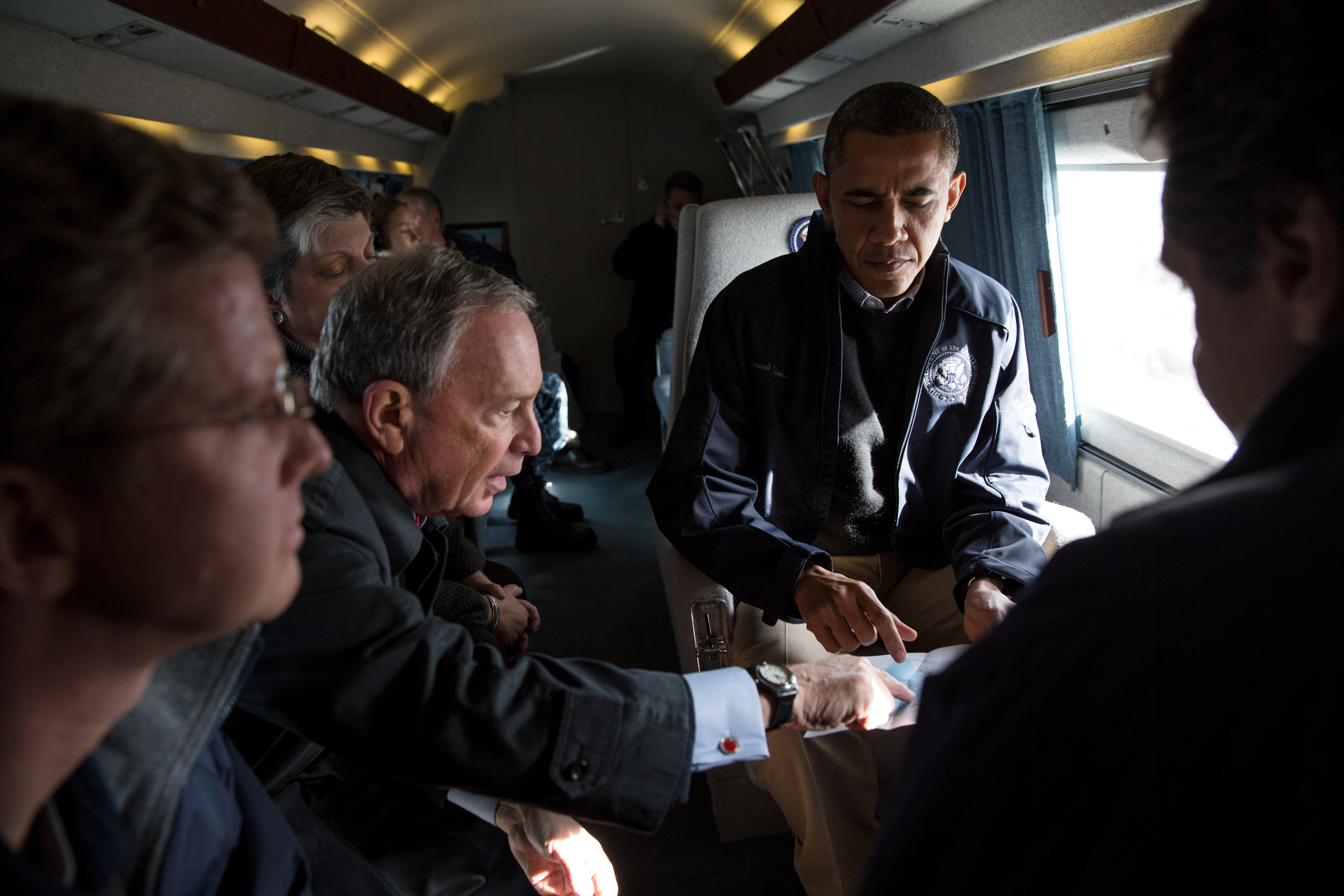
Bloomberg with President Barack Obama in 2012

Bloomberg chose to apply a statistical, metrics-based management approach to city government, and granted departmental commissioners' broad autonomy in their decision-making. Breaking with 190 years of tradition, he implemented what New York Times political reporter Adam Nagourney called a "bullpen" open office plan, similar to a Wall Street trading floor, in which dozens of aides and managerial staff are seated together in a large chamber. The design is intended to promote accountability and accessibility.

Bloomberg accepted a remuneration of $1 annually, in lieu of the mayoral salary.

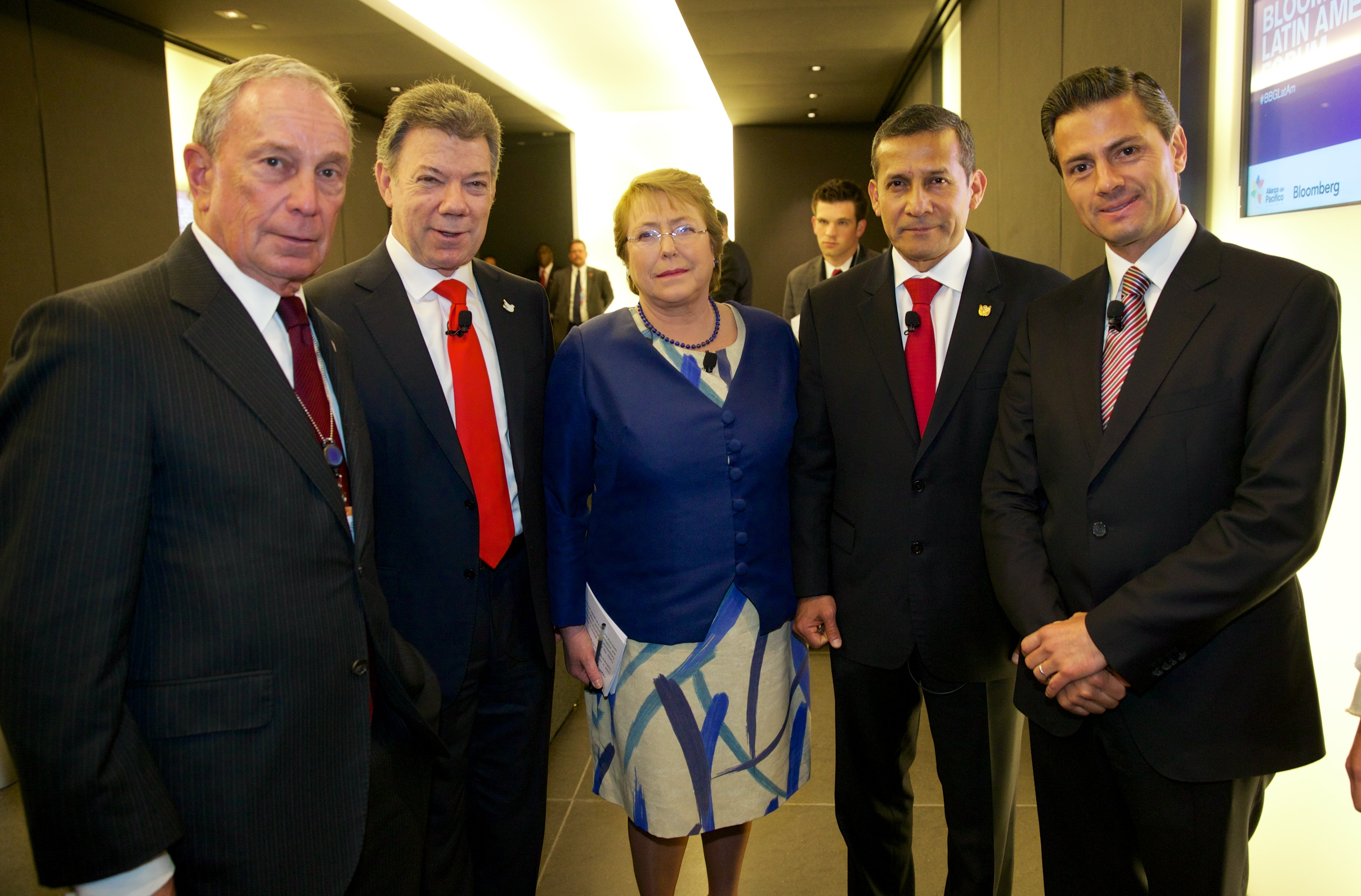
Bloomberg with presidents of Colombia, Chile, Peru, and Mexico in 2014

As mayor, Bloomberg turned the city's $6 billion budget deficit into a $3 billion surplus, largely by raising property taxes. Bloomberg increased city funding for the new development of affordable housing through a plan that created and preserved an estimated 160,000 affordable homes in the city. In 2003, he implemented a successful smoking ban in all indoor workplaces, including bars and restaurants, and many other cities and states followed suit. On December 5, 2006, New York City became the first city in the United States to ban trans-fat from all restaurants. This went into effect in July 2008, and has since been adopted in many other cities and countries. Bloomberg created bicycle lanes, required chain restaurants to post calorie counts, and pedestrianized much of Times Square. In 2011, Bloomberg launched the NYC Young Men's Initiative, a $127 million initiative to support programs and policies designed to address disparities between young Black and Latino men and their peers, and personally donated $30 million to the project. In 2010, Bloomberg supported the then-controversial Islamic complex near Ground Zero.

Under the Bloomberg Administration, the New York City Police Department greatly expanded its stop-and-frisk program, with a six-fold increase in documented stops. The policy was challenged in U.S. Federal Court, which ruled that the city's implementation of the policy violated citizens' rights under the Fourth Amendment of the Constitution and encouraged racial profiling. Bloomberg's administration appealed the ruling; however, his successor, Mayor Bill de Blasio, dropped the appeal and allowed the ruling to take effect. After the September 11 attacks, with assistance from the Central Intelligence Agency, Bloomberg's administration oversaw a controversial program that surveilled Muslim communities on the basis of their religion, ethnicity, and language. The program was discontinued in 2014.

In a January 2014 Quinnipiac poll, 64 percent of voters called Bloomberg's 12 years as mayor "mainly a success".

== Post-mayoral political involvement ==
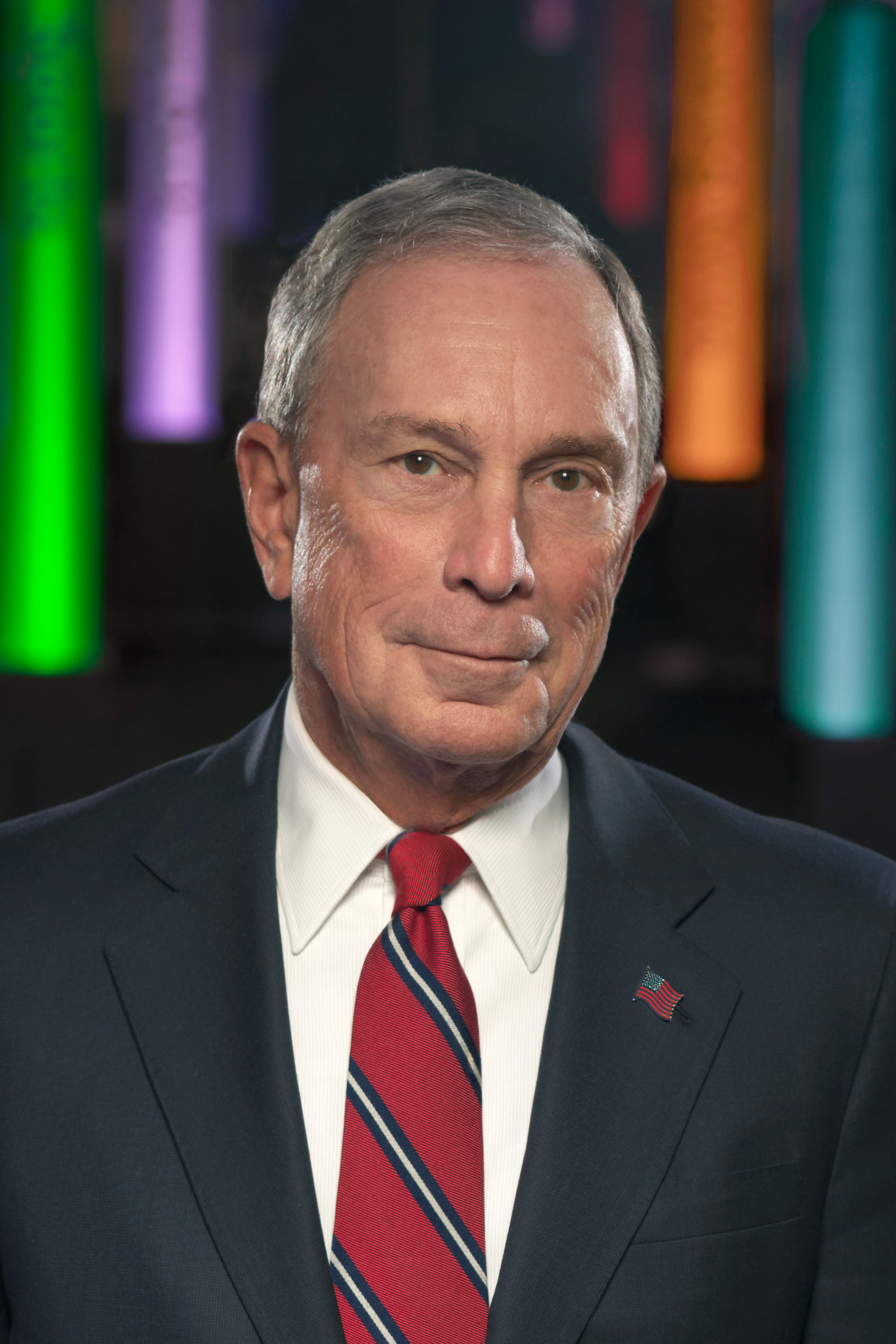
Bloomberg in 2015

Bloomberg was frequently mentioned as a possible centrist candidate for the presidential elections in 2008 and 2012, as well as for governor of New York in 2010 or vice-president in 2008.

In the immediate aftermath of Hurricane Sandy in November 2012, Bloomberg penned an op-ed officially endorsing Barack Obama for president, citing Obama's policies on climate change.

=== 2016 elections ===
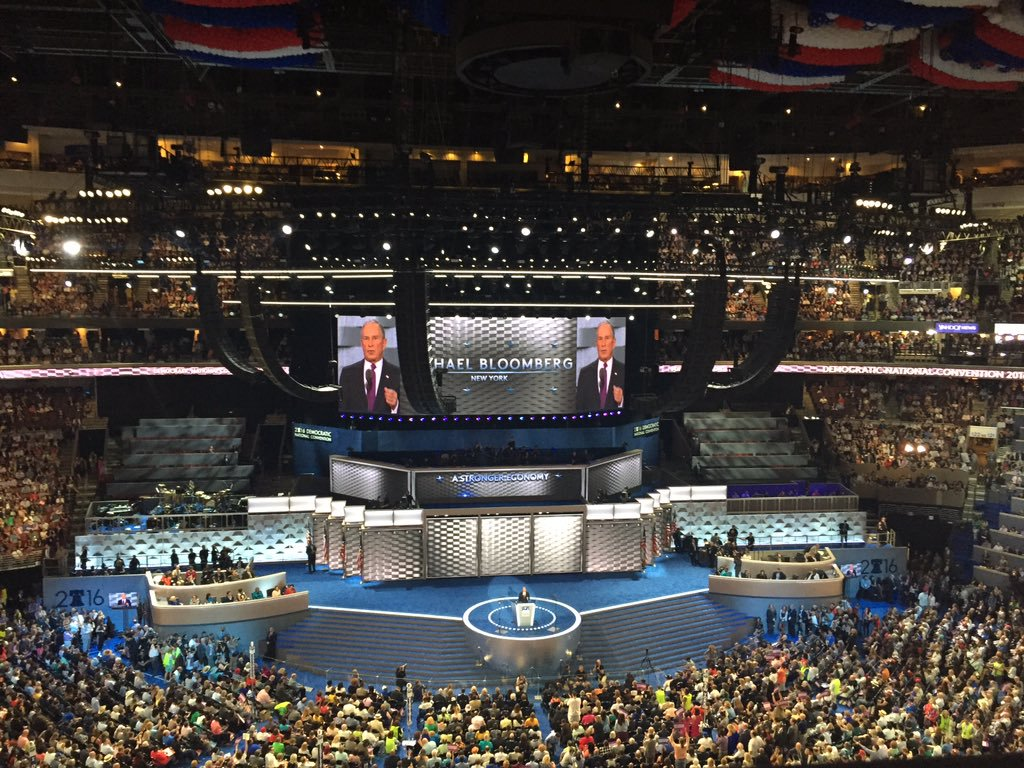
Bloomberg speaking at the 2016 Democratic National Convention

On January 23, 2016, it was reported that Bloomberg was again considering a presidential run, as an independent candidate in the 2016 election, if Bernie Sanders got the Democratic party nomination. This was the first time he had officially confirmed he was considering a run. Bloomberg supporters believed that Bloomberg could run as a centrist and capture many voters who were dissatisfied with the likely Democratic and Republican nominees. However, on March 7, Bloomberg announced he would not be running for president.

In July 2016, Bloomberg delivered a speech at the 2016 Democratic National Convention in which he called Hillary Clinton "the right choice". Bloomberg warned of the dangers a Donald Trump presidency would pose. He said Trump "wants you to believe that we can solve our biggest problems by deporting Mexicans and shutting out Muslims. He wants you to believe that erecting trade barriers will bring back good jobs. He's wrong on both counts." Bloomberg also said Trump's economic plans "would make it harder for small businesses to compete", and would "erode our influence in the world". Trump responded to the speech by condemning Bloomberg in a series of tweets.

=== 2018 elections ===
In June 2018, Bloomberg pledged $80 million to support Democratic congressional candidates in the 2018 election, with the goal of flipping control of the Republican-controlled House to Democrats. In a statement, Bloomberg said that Republican House leadership were "absolutely feckless" and had failed to govern responsibly. Bloomberg advisor Howard Wolfson was chosen to lead the effort, which was to target mainly suburban districts. By early October, Bloomberg had committed more than $100 million to returning the House and Senate to Democratic power, fueling speculation about a presidential run in 2020. On October 10, 2018, Bloomberg announced that he had returned to the Democratic Party.

=== 2020 presidential campaign ===
Bloomberg's 2020 presidential campaign logo

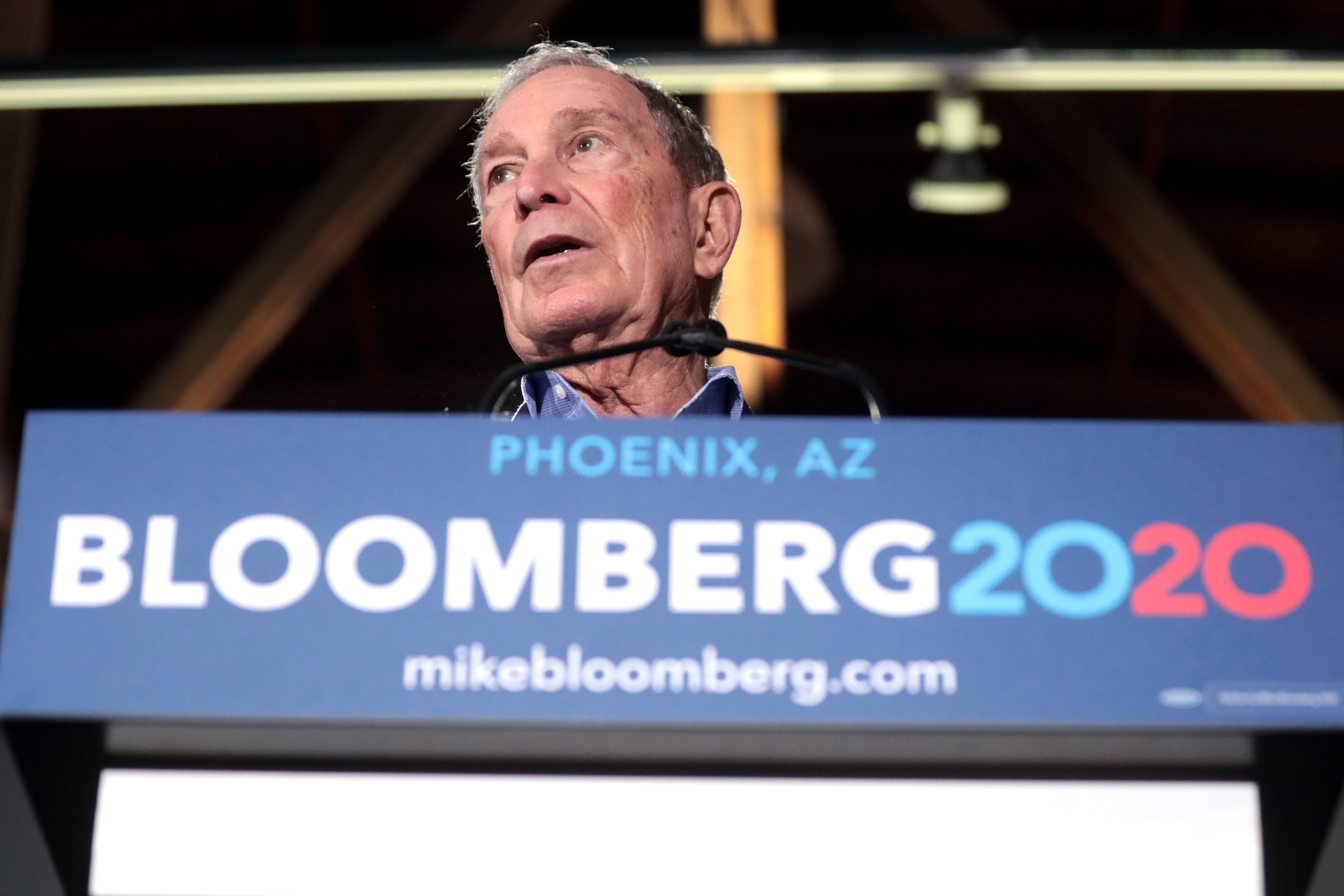
Bloomberg at a campaign rally in Phoenix, Arizona, in February 2020

On March 5, 2019, Bloomberg announced that he would not run for president in 2020. Instead, he encouraged the Democratic Party to "nominate a Democrat who will be in the strongest position to defeat Donald Trump." However, due to his dissatisfaction with the Democratic field, Bloomberg reconsidered. He officially launched his campaign for the 2020 Democratic nomination on November 24, 2019.

Bloomberg self-funded his campaign from his personal fortune and did not accept campaign contributions.

Bloomberg's campaign suffered from his lackluster performance in two televised debates. When Bloomberg participated in his first presidential debate, Senator Elizabeth Warren challenged him to release women from non-disclosure agreements relating to their allegations of sexual harassment at Bloomberg L.P. Two days later, Bloomberg announced that there were three women who had made complaints concerning him, and added that he would release any of the three if they requested. Warren continued her attack in the second debate the next week. Others criticized Bloomberg for his wealth and campaign spending, as well as his former affiliation with the Republican Party.

As a late entrant to the race, Bloomberg skipped the first four state primaries and caucuses. He spent over $1 billion of his personal fortune on the primary campaign, more than all other Democratic candidates combined at that stage. Bloomberg said he wanted to spend so much money as an "investment" into removing or at least trying to unseat President Trump from the White House. His campaign blanketed the country with campaign advertisements on broadcast and cable television, the Internet, and radio, as well as direct mail. Bloomberg also spent heavily on campaign operations that grew to 200 field offices and more than 2,400 paid campaign staffers. His support in nationwide opinion polls never exceeded 15 percent, but stagnated or dropped before Super Tuesday, while former vice president Joe Biden became the frontrunner after receiving the support of major candidates Pete Buttigieg and Amy Klobuchar. Bloomberg suspended his campaign on March 4, 2020, after a disappointing Super Tuesday in which he won only American Samoa. Multiple former campaign staffers sued Bloomberg alleging that he promised his employees to be paid through the election but they were fired instead after the candidate dropped out. Five years later, a Massachusetts man working for his campaign won $90,000 in back pay plus interest.

After dropping out from the presidential race, Bloomberg endorsed Biden. Bloomberg donated $18 million to the Democratic National Committee and publicly planned a "massive spending blitz" to support Biden's campaign. Speaking on the final night of the 2020 Democratic National Convention, Bloomberg took aim at Trump's handling of the COVID-19 pandemic and the American economy: "Would you rehire or work for someone who ran your business into the ground? Who always does what's best for him or her, even when it hurts the company, and whose reckless decisions put you in danger, and who spends more time tweeting than working? If the answer is no, why the hell would we ever rehire Donald Trump for another four years?"

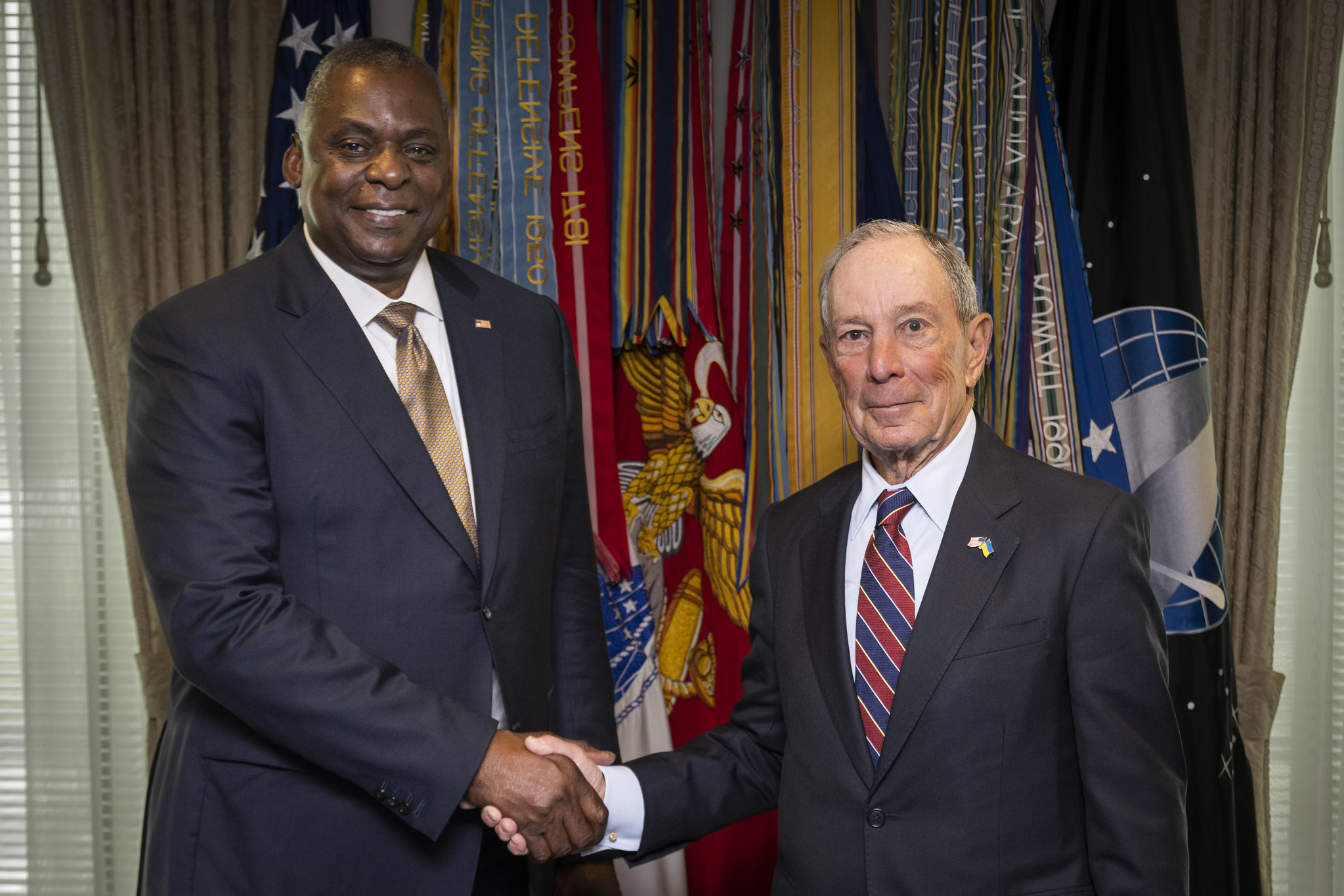
Bloomberg is sworn in as chair of the Defense Innovation Board in June 2022.

=== Defense Innovation Board ===
In February 2022, Bloomberg was nominated to chair the Defense Innovation Board, being sworn in on June 22, 2022.

=== Political contributions ===
As of August 2026, Bloomberg spent $19.8 million in support of Democratic candidates in the 2026 United States elections.

== Political positions ==
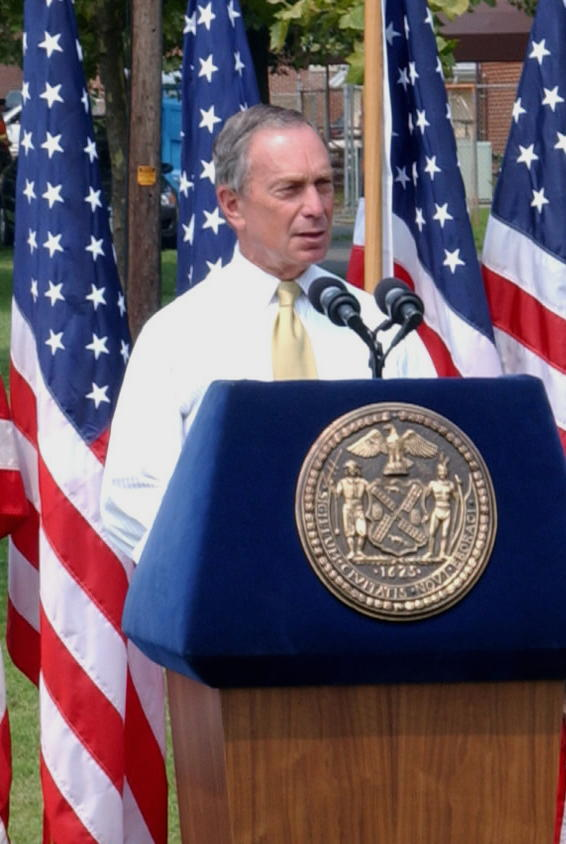
Bloomberg delivering a speech in 2004

Bloomberg was a Democrat until 2001, when he switched to the Republican Party to run for mayor. He switched to an independent in 2007, and registered again as a Democrat in October 2018. In 2004, he endorsed the re-election of George W. Bush, and spoke at the 2004 Republican National Convention. He endorsed Barack Obama's re-election in 2012, endorsed Hillary Clinton in the 2016 election, and spoke at the 2016 Democratic National Convention. In 2008, he did not make a presidential election endorsement, but he voted for Obama, according to a 2020 statement by "Stu Loeser, a Bloomberg [2020] campaign spokesman".

As Mayor of New York, Bloomberg supported government initiatives in public health and welfare. This included tobacco control efforts (including an increase in the legal age to purchase tobacco products, a ban on smoking in indoor workplaces, and an increase in the cigarette tax); the elimination of the use of artificial trans fats in restaurants; and bans on all flavored tobacco and e-cigarette products including menthol flavors. Bloomberg also launched an unsuccessful effort to ban on certain large (more than 16 fluid ounce) sugary sodas at restaurants and food service establishments in the city. These initiatives were supported by public health advocates, but were criticized by some as "nanny state" policies.

Over his career, Bloomberg has "mingled support for progressive causes with more conservative positions on law enforcement, business regulation, and school choice". Bloomberg supports gun-control measures, abortion rights, same-sex marriage, and a pathway to citizenship for illegal immigrants. He advocates for a public health insurance option that he has called "Medicare for all for people that are uncovered", rather than a universal single-payer healthcare system. He is concerned about climate change, and has touted his mayoral efforts to reduce greenhouse gases. Bloomberg supported the Iraq War, and opposed creating a timeline for withdrawing troops. Bloomberg has sometimes embraced the use of surveillance in efforts to deter crime and protect the public against terrorism.

During, and after, his tenure, he was a staunch supporter of stop-and-frisk. In November 2019, Bloomberg apologized for supporting it. He advocates reversing many of the Trump tax cuts. His own tax plan includes implementing a 5 percent surtax on incomes above $5 million a year, and would raise federal revenue by $5 trillion over a decade. He opposes a wealth tax, saying that it would likely be found unconstitutional. He has also proposed more stringent financial regulations that include tougher oversight for big banks, a financial transactions tax, and stronger consumer protections. He supported decreasing estate-tax threshold to collect more estate taxes and close tax avoidance schemes. According to ProPublica investigation, he set up multiple GRATs, thus shielding parts of his fortune for his heirs.

Bloomberg stated that running as a Democrat – not an independent – was the only path he saw to defeating Donald Trump, saying: "In 2020, the great likelihood is that an independent would just split the anti-Trump vote and end up re-electing the President. That's a risk I refused to run in 2016, and we can't afford to run it now."

In the 2020 general election, Bloomberg invested $115 million in Joe Biden's campaign in key states like Florida, Ohio, and Texas, contributed millions to various Democrats in local races, and raised over $16 million to clear court fines for nearly 32,000 Black and Hispanic Florida voters with felony convictions. Bloomberg contributed $19 million to a pro-Biden super PAC in support of Biden's reelection in 2024. In October 2024, Bloomberg contributed $50 million to support Kamala Harris's 2024 election campaign.In October 2026 Bloomberg donated 80$ million to Democratic party and their midterm elections efforts.

== Philanthropy ==
In August 2010, Bloomberg signed The Giving Pledge, whereby the wealthy pledge to give away at least half of their wealth. In his lifetime, he has given away $24.5 billion overall, including $4.3 billion in 2025. He was listed as America's highest giving philanthropist, according to Chronicle of Philanthropy, for three consecutive years 2023–2025. He has been in the top ten on the publication's list of America's biggest donors since 2004.

His Bloomberg Philanthropies foundation focuses on public health, the arts, government innovation, the environment, and education. Through the foundation, he donated or pledged $767 million in 2018, and more than $1 billion in 2019.

In 2011, recipients included the Campaign for Tobacco-Free Kids; Centers for Disease Control and Prevention; Johns Hopkins Bloomberg School of Public Health; World Lung Foundation and the World Health Organization. According to The New York Times, Bloomberg was an "anonymous donor" to the Carnegie Corporation from 2001 to 2010, with gifts ranging from $5 million to $20 million each year. The Carnegie Corporation distributed these contributions to hundreds of New York City organizations ranging from the Dance Theatre of Harlem to Gilda's Club, a non-profit organization that provides support to people and families living with cancer. He continues to support the arts through his foundation.

Bloomberg gave $254 million in 2009 to almost 1,400 nonprofit organizations, saying, "I am a big believer in giving it all away and have always said that the best financial planning ends with bouncing the check to the undertaker."

=== COVID-19 response ===
During the 2020 COVID-19 pandemic and its aftermath, Bloomberg through his foundation committed to a wide range of urgent causes including researching treatments and vaccines, leading contact tracing to root out the virus, supporting the World Health Organization, and funding global efforts to fight the spread of the disease and protect vulnerable populations. Action included:

- Cofounding a $75 million fund for nonprofits impacted by COVID-19 in New York City
- Donating $6 million to World Central Kitchen to serve meals to health care workers in New York City
- Partnering with Johns Hopkins University to train COVID-19 contact tracers through its school of public health and search for a treatment of the virus.
- Convening mayors through a partnership with Harvard College to learn and discuss their pandemic response, featuring a bipartisan roster of speakers and attendees.
- Leading New York's contact tracing effort
- Launching an information and action sharing network for cities through the National League of Cities
- Supporting international efforts to combat the spread of COVID-19 and prepare regional leaders through the International Rescue Committee, the World Health Organization, Vital Strategies and other partners

=== Environmental advocacy ===
Bloomberg is an environmentalist and has advocated policy to fight climate change at least since he became the mayor of New York City. Between 2015 and 2025, Bloomberg pledged over $3 billion to environmental efforts and policies. In September 2023, the New York Times called Bloomberg "perhaps the world's single largest funder of climate activism." At the national level, Bloomberg has consistently pushed for transitioning the United States' energy mix from fossil fuels to clean energy. In July 2011, Bloomberg Philanthropies donated $50 million to Sierra Club's Beyond Coal campaign, allowing the campaign to expand its efforts to shut down coal-fired power plants from 15 states to 45 states. In 2015, Bloomberg announced an additional $30 million contribution to the Beyond Coal initiative, matched with another $30 million by other donors, to help secure the retirement of half of America's fleet of coal plants by 2017. In July 2017, Europe Beyond Coal was established to phase out use of coal on the continent by 2030. Austria closed its final coal-fired plant in April 2020. In early June 2019, Bloomberg pledged $500 million to reduce climate impacts and shut remaining coal-fired power plants by 2030 via the new Beyond Carbon initiative. In September 2023, Bloomberg committed another $500 million to Beyond Carbon to "finish the job on coal."

Bloomberg Philanthropies awarded a $6 million grant to the Environmental Defense Fund in support of strict regulations on fracking in the 14 states with the heaviest natural gas production.

In 2013, Bloomberg and Bloomberg Philanthropies launched the Risky Business initiative with former Treasury Secretary Hank Paulson and hedge-fund billionaire Tom Steyer. The joint effort worked to convince the business community of the need for more sustainable energy and development policies, by quantifying and publicizing the economic risks the United States faces from the impact of climate change. In January 2015, Bloomberg led Bloomberg Philanthropies in a $48-million partnership with the Heising-Simons family to launch the Clean Energy Initiative. The initiative supports state-based solutions aimed at ensuring America has a clean, reliable, and affordable energy system.

Since 2010, Bloomberg has taken an increasingly global role on environmental issues. From 2010 to 2013, he served as the chairman of the C40 Cities Climate Leadership Group, a network of the world's biggest cities working together to reduce carbon emissions. During his tenure, Bloomberg worked with President Bill Clinton to merge C40 with the Clinton Climate Initiative, with the goal of amplifying their efforts in the global fight against climate change worldwide. He serves as the president of the board of C40 Cities. In January 2014, Bloomberg began a five-year commitment totaling $53 million through Bloomberg Philanthropies to the Vibrant Oceans Initiative. The initiative partners Bloomberg Philanthropies with Oceana, Rare, and Encourage Capital to help reform fisheries and increase sustainable populations worldwide. In 2018, Bloomberg joined Ray Dalio in announcing a commitment of $185 million towards protecting the oceans.

In 2014, United Nations Secretary General Ban Ki-moon appointed Bloomberg as his first Special Envoy for Cities and Climate Change to help the United Nations work with cities to prevent climate change. In September 2014, Bloomberg convened with Ban and global leaders at the UN Climate Summit to announce definite action to fight climate change in 2015. In 2018, Ban's successor António Guterres appointed Bloomberg as UN envoy for climate action. He resigned in November 2019, in the run-up to his presidential campaign. On 5 February 2021, however, he was re-appointed by Guterres as his Special Envoy on Climate Ambition and Solutions in the lead-up to the climate conference in Scotland scheduled for November 2021.

In late 2014, Bloomberg, Ban Ki-moon, and global city networks ICLEI-Local Governments for Sustainability (ICLEI), C40 Cities Climate Leadership Group (C40) and United Cities and Local Governments (UCLG), with support from UN-Habitat, launched the Compact of Mayors, a global coalition of mayors and city officials pledging to reduce local greenhouse gas emissions, enhance climate resilience, and track their progress transparently. To date, over 250 cities representing more than 300 million people worldwide and 4.1 percent of the total global population, have committed to the Compact of Mayors, which was merged with the Covenant of Mayors in June 2016.

In 2015, Bloomberg and Paris mayor Anne Hidalgo created the Climate Summit for Local Leaders. which convened assembled hundreds of city leaders from around the world at Paris City Hall to discuss fighting climate change. The Summit concluded with the presentation of the Paris Declaration, a pledge by leaders from assembled global cities to cut carbon emissions by 3.7 gigatons annually by 2030.

During the 2015 UN Climate Change Conference in Paris, Mark Carney, Governor of the Bank of England and chair of the Financial Stability Board, announced that Bloomberg would lead a new global task force designed to help industry and financial markets understand the growing risks of climate change.

Following President Donald Trump's announcement that the U.S. government would withdraw from the Paris climate accord, Bloomberg outlined a coalition of cities, states, universities and businesses that had come together to honor America's commitment under the agreement through 'America's Pledge'. Bloomberg offered up to $15 million to the UNFCCC, the UN body that assists countries with climate change efforts. About a month later, Bloomberg and California Governor Jerry Brown announced that the America's Pledge coalition would work to "quantify the actions taken by U.S. states, cities and business to drive down greenhouse gas emissions consistent with the goals of the Paris Agreement." In announcing the initiative, Bloomberg said "the American government may have pulled out of the Paris agreement, but American society remains committed to it." Two think tanks, World Resource Institute and the Rocky Mountain Institute, will work with America's Pledge to analyze the work cities, states and businesses do to meet the U.S. commitment to the Paris agreement.

In May 2019, Bloomberg announced a 2020 Midwestern Collegiate Climate Summit in Washington University in St. Louis with the aim to bring together leaders from Midwestern universities, local government and the private sector to reduce climate impacts in the region.

Expanding on the work of Beyond Coal and Beyond Carbon, Bloomberg launched Beyond Petrochemicals in September 2022. The campaign takes aim at the rapid expansion of U.S. petrochemicals and plastic pollution. The $85 million campaign aims to block the construction of 120 proposed petrochemical projects in Louisiana, Texas and the Ohio River Valley.

Bloomberg serves as global adviser to the winners of the Earthshot Prize. His foundation Bloomberg Philanthropies is a founding partner of the Prize which awards £1,000,000 to each of five winners each year whose work will achieve ambitious climate and sustainability goals by 2030. The 2023 finalists were announced at the Earthshot Prize Innovation Summit in September 2023 in New York, and the five winners were announced in November 2023 in Singapore.

=== Johns Hopkins University philanthropy ===
As of 2024, Bloomberg has given more than $4.55 billion to Johns Hopkins University, his alma mater. His first contribution, in 1965, had been $5. He made his first $1 million commitment to JHU in 1984, and subsequently became the first individual to exceed $1 billion in lifetime donations to a single U.S. institution of higher education.

Bloomberg's contributions to Johns Hopkins "fueled major improvements in the university's reputation and rankings, its competitiveness for faculty and students, and the appearance of its campus," and included construction of a children's hospital (the Charlotte R. Bloomberg Children's Center Building, named after Bloomberg's mother); a physics building, a school of public health (the Johns Hopkins Bloomberg School of Public Health), libraries, and biomedical research facilities, including the Institute for Cell Engineering, a stem-cell research institute within the School of Medicine, and the Malaria Research Institute within the School of Public Health. In 2013, Bloomberg committed $350 million to Johns Hopkins, five-sevenths of which were allocated to the Bloomberg Distinguished Professorships. In 2016, Bloomberg Philanthropies contributed $300 million to establish the Bloomberg American Health Initiative. Bloomberg also funded the launch of the Bloomberg–Kimmel Institute for Cancer Immunotherapy within the Johns Hopkins School of Medicine in East Baltimore, with a $50 million gift; an additional $50 million was given by philanthropist Sidney Kimmel, and $25 million by other donors. It will support cancer therapy research, technology and infrastructure development, and private sector partnerships. In 2016, Bloomberg joined Vice President Joe Biden for the institute's formal launch, embracing Biden's "Cancer Moonshot" initiative, which seeks to find a cure for cancer through national coordination of government and private sector resources. In 2018, Bloomberg contributed a further gift of $1.8 billion to Johns Hopkins, allowing the university to practice need-blind admission and meet the full financial need of admitted students.

In 2024, Bloomberg announced a $1 billion gift to Johns Hopkins University to make tuition free for all medical school students whose families make under $300,000 a year, beginning in the fall of 2024. The donation also increased financial aid for students enrolled in nursing, public health and other graduate programs.

=== Other educational and research philanthropy ===
In 1996, Bloomberg endowed the William Henry Bloomberg Professorship at Harvard University with a $3 million gift in honor of his father, who died in 1963, saying: "Throughout his life, he recognized the importance of reaching out to the non-profit sector to help better the welfare of the entire community."

In 2015, Bloomberg donated $100 million to Cornell Tech, the applied sciences graduate school of Cornell University on the school's Roosevelt Island campus. Through Bloomberg Philanthropies, Bloomberg established the American Talent Initiative in 2016 which is committed to increasing the number of lower-income high-achieving students attending elite colleges. Bloomberg Philanthropies also supports CollegePoint which has provided advising to lower- and moderate-income high school students since 2014. In 2016, the Museum of Science, Boston, announced a $50 million gift from Bloomberg. Bloomberg credited the museum with sparking his intellectual curiosity as a patron and student during his youth in Medford, Massachusetts. It is the largest donation in the museum's 186-year history.

Bloomberg donated $100 million to America's four Historically Black Medical Schools in 2020 as part of Bloomberg Philanthropies' Greenwood Initiative, which tackles the racial wealth gap and addresses decades of under-investment in Black communities. The gift to Meharry Medical College, Howard University College of Medicine, Morehouse School of Medicine and Charles R. Drew University of Medicine and Science provided grants to reduce debt for students, meaning many medical students enrolled at the time and for the four years to follow would graduate free of debt.

In April 2022, Bloomberg announced two separate $100 million donations, one to Harlem Children's Zone's Promise Academy and another to Success Academy Charter Schools.

In 2024, Bloomberg again made a donation to the nation's Historically Black Medical Schools — this time gifting $600 million to the four schools to support their endowments. The New York Times reported the endowments were "significantly underfunded" due to entrenched discrimination, but Bloomberg's gift was expected to increase three of the schools' endowment sizes by more than 100%. The donation also included $5 million to help Xavier University to establish a new medical school.

In 2025, Bloomberg expanded his support of HBCU education by funding a $20 million initiative to develop K-12 charter schools on HBCU campuses and establish a direct pipeline of quality educational opportunities.

=== Urban innovation philanthropy ===
In July 2011, Bloomberg launched a $24 million initiative to fund "Innovation Delivery Teams" in five cities. The teams are one of Bloomberg Philanthropies' key goals: advancing government innovation. In December 2011, Bloomberg Philanthropies launched a partnership with online ticket search engine SeatGeek to connect artists with new audiences. Called the Discover New York Arts Project, the project includes organizations HERE, New York Theatre Workshop, and the Kaufman Center.

In 2013, Bloomberg announced the Mayors Challenge competition to drive innovation in American cities. The program was later expanded to competitions in Latin America and Europe.

In 2016, Bloomberg gave Harvard $32 million to create the Bloomberg Harvard City Leadership Initiative within Harvard Kennedy School's Ash Center for Democratic Governance and Innovation; the initiative provides training to mayors and their aides on innovative municipal leadership and challenges facing cities. Since its founding, 275 mayors and more than 400 top city aides have gone through the program, prompting Time Magazine to call Bloomberg "the nation's mayoral tutor".

In March 2021, Bloomberg gave Harvard $150 million to create the Bloomberg Center for Cities to support mayors.

=== Tobacco, gun control, and public health ===
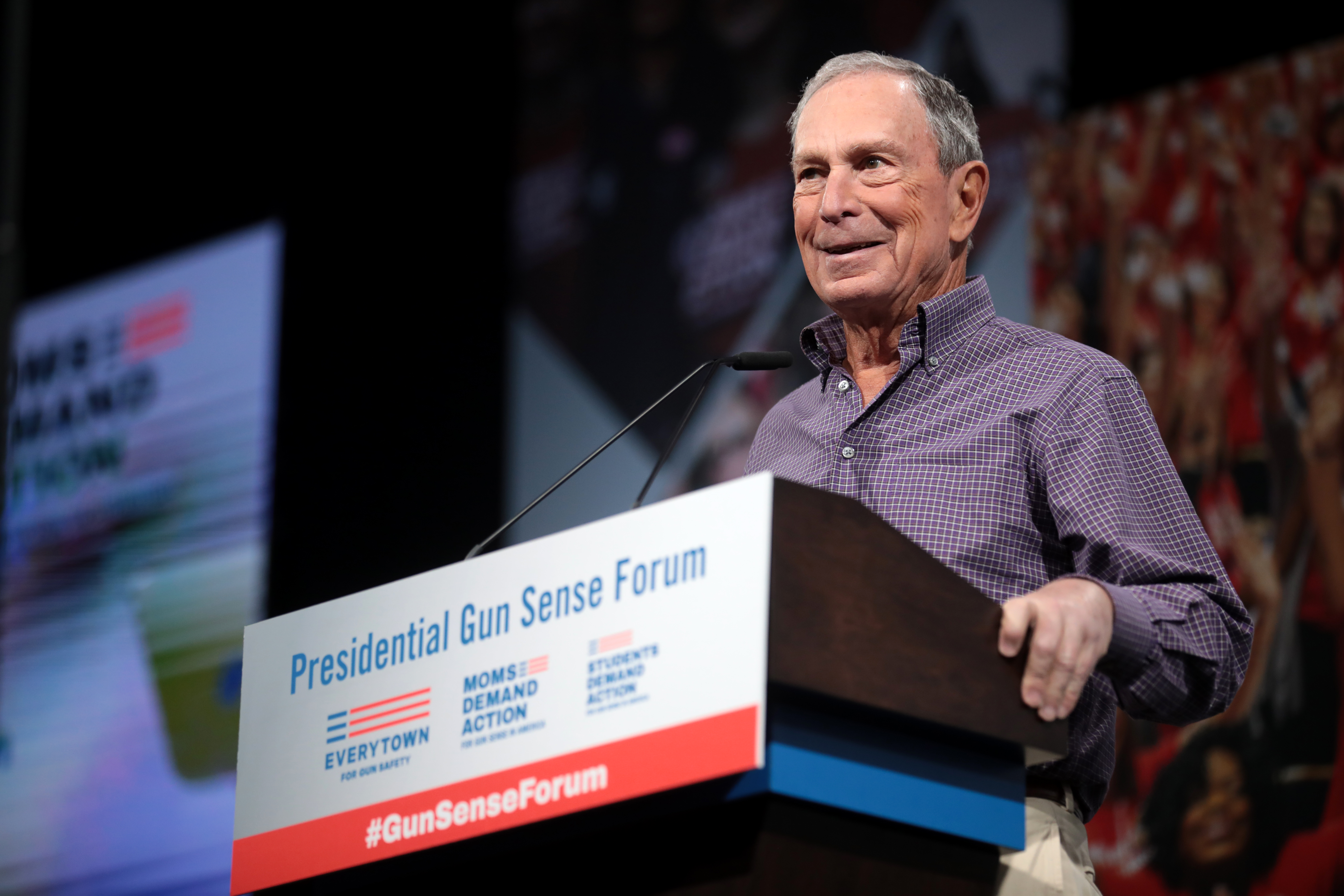
Bloomberg speaking at an Everytown for Gun Safety event in August 2019

Bloomberg has been a long-time donor to global tobacco control efforts. Bloomberg has donated close to $1 billion to the World Health Organization (WHO) to promote anti-smoking efforts, including $125 million in 2006, $250 million in 2008, and $360 million, making Bloomberg Philanthropies the developing world's biggest funder of tobacco-control initiatives. In 2013, it was reported that Bloomberg had donated $109.24 million in 556 grants and 61 countries to campaigns against tobacco. Bloomberg's contributions are aimed at "getting countries to monitor tobacco use, introduce strong tobacco-control laws, and create mass media campaigns to educate the public about the dangers of tobacco use". Bloomberg Philanthropies and the Campaign for Tobacco-Free Kids jointly launched a $160 million, three-year campaign against youth use of electronic cigarettes (vaping).

Bloomberg is the co-founder of Everytown for Gun Safety (formerly Mayors Against Illegal Guns), a gun control advocacy group.

In 2016, the World Health Organization appointed Bloomberg as its Global Ambassador for Noncommunicable Diseases.

=== National September 11 Memorial and Museum ===
In October 2006, Bloomberg became chairman of the board and chief fundraiser of the National September 11 Memorial & Museum; CBS News and Politico credited him with having resolved financial and design obstacles that delayed its completion. He was mayor during the initial planning stages of the memorial & museum. Once he assumed the Chairmanship, he sought to reduce cost increases, finalize fundraising efforts, and resume the mapping and design processes. Bloomberg has raised $450 million for the National September 11 Memorial & Museum, including a $50 million personal contribution, making him its largest single donor. Bloomberg secured donations from major corporations by saying they held some responsibility as members of the global community. One of his first acts as chairman was securing a $10 million donation from American Express. Bloomberg recruited members to the board and donations across the political spectrum, including David Koch and Jon Stewart. Bloomberg is also chairman of the Perelman Performing Arts Center in the World Trade Center complex, to which he has donated $130 million.

At the ceremony opening for the National September 11 Memorial Museum, Bloomberg said the museum was "a reminder to us and all future generations that freedom carries heavy responsibilities". He continued to lead the annual 9/11 ceremony after leaving office. In 2010 he replanted the Callery Pear tree that had been originally planted in the World Trade Center complex and was discovered in the rubble and saved after the attacks. In September 2021, marking the 20th anniversary of the attacks, Bloomberg and the museum launched The Never Forget Fund, focused on educational programming about 9/11.

=== Other philanthropy ===
Through Bloomberg Philanthropies, Bloomberg supported the Fresh Air Fund's creation of 'Open Spaces in the City' in summer 2020 to provide socially-distant areas for kids to play during the COVID-19 pandemic, as well as jobs for local teens. He donated $3 million to the construction of a new public library in his hometown of Medford and $75 million for The Shed, a new arts and cultural center in Hudson Yards, Manhattan.

In September 2023, the Perelman Performing Arts Center opened with $130 million of support from Bloomberg, who serves as its chair. The $500 million art center is the final major piece of the redevelopment of the site where the World Trade Center once stood.

Following the Hamas attack on Israel in October 2023, Bloomberg committed to matching donations to the Israeli Red Cross, known as Magen David Adom. By October 19, 2023, Bloomberg had matched $25 million in donations to the ambulance and Medivac services.

Bloomberg also endowed his hometown synagogue, Temple Shalom, which was renamed for his parents as the William and Charlotte Bloomberg Jewish Community Center of Medford.

Bloomberg hosted the Global Business Forum in 2017, during the annual meeting of the United Nations General Assembly; the gathering featured international CEOs, heads of state, and other prominent speakers.

In 2009, Bloomberg met with fellow billionaires, including Warren Buffett, Bill Gates, Ted Turner and Oprah Winfrey, to address issues ranging from the environment, health care and concerns over population growth. Although no formal organization was established, the effort was understood to be designed to help bring various philanthropic projects of the mega-donors into a more unified effort.

=== Campaign finance controversies ===
In March 2020, during Bloomberg's presidential bid, he was sued by multiple former campaign staffers alleging fraud, and claiming that as many as 2,000 campaign staffers who were promised to be paid through the election were fired instead.

== Personal life ==
=== Family and relationships ===
In 1975, Bloomberg married Susan Elizabeth Barbara Brown, a British national from Yorkshire, United Kingdom. They have two daughters: Emma Beth (born c. 1979), and Georgina Leigh (born 1983), who were featured on Born Rich, a 2003 documentary film about the children of the extremely wealthy. Bloomberg divorced Brown in 1993, but he has said she remains his "best friend". Since 2000, Bloomberg has lived with former New York state banking superintendent Diana Taylor. In 2026, the two became married. Emma Bloomberg was married to Chris Frissora, son of Mark Frissora, and they had a daughter with a hybrid surname, Frissberg.

Bloomberg's younger sister, Marjorie Tiven, has been commissioner of the New York City Commission for the United Nations, Consular Corps, and Protocol, since February 2002.

=== Relations with the Sackler family ===
During the opioid epidemic in the United States, Mortimer Sackler — son of a co-founder of the company, Purdue Pharma, and a member of its board, met with Bloomberg to "seek his help and guidance on the current issues we are facing". Purdue's head of communications, Josephine Martin, added "Any positive news or ability to get our side out is through Bloomberg. We have given them exclusives and they have treated us very well." Bloomberg also advised Mortimer Sackler to consult Stu Loeser to help manage communications.

=== Religion ===
Although he attended Hebrew school, had a bar mitzvah, and his family kept a kosher kitchen, Bloomberg today lives a mostly secular religious life, attending synagogue mainly during the High Holidays and a Passover Seder with his sister, Marjorie Tiven. Neither of his daughters had bat mitzvahs, nor does either daughter follow a religiously Jewish lifestyle, such as abiding kosher dietary restrictions or keeping the Jewish sabbath.

=== Public image and lifestyle ===
Throughout his business career, Bloomberg has made numerous statements which have been considered by some to be insulting, derogatory, sexist or misogynistic. When working on Wall Street in the 1960s and 1970s, Bloomberg claimed in his 1997 autobiography, he had "a girlfriend in every city". On various occasions, Bloomberg allegedly commented, "I'd do her", regarding certain women, some of whom were co-workers or employees. Bloomberg later said that by "do", he meant that he would have a personal relationship with the woman.

During his term as mayor, he lived at his own home on the Upper East Side of Manhattan, instead of Gracie Mansion, the official mayoral residence. In 2013, he owned 13 properties in various countries around the world, including a $20 million Georgian mansion in Southampton, New York. In 2015, he acquired 4 Cheyne Walk, a historical property in Cheyne Walk, Chelsea, London, which once belonged to writer George Eliot. Bloomberg and his daughters own houses in Bermuda, and stay there frequently.

Bloomberg stated that during his mayoralty, he rode the New York City Subway on a daily basis, particularly in the commute from his 79th Street home to his office at City Hall. An August 2007 story in The New York Times stated that he was often seen chauffeured by two New York Police Department-owned SUVs to an express train station to avoid having to change from the local to the express trains on the IRT Lexington Avenue Line. He supported the construction of the 7 Subway Extension and the Second Avenue Subway; in December 2013, Bloomberg took a ceremonial ride on a train to the new 34th Street station to celebrate a part of his legacy as mayor.

During his tenure as mayor, Bloomberg made cameos, playing himself in the films The Adjustment Bureau and New Year's Eve, as well as in episodes of 30 Rock, Curb Your Enthusiasm, The Good Wife, and two episodes of Law & Order.

Bloomberg is a private pilot. He owns six airplanes: three Dassault Falcon 900s, a Beechcraft B300, a Pilatus PC-24, and a Cessna 182 Skylane. Bloomberg also owns two helicopters: an AW109, and an Airbus helicopter; and, as of 2012, was near the top of the waiting list for an AW609 tiltrotor aircraft. In his youth, he was a licensed amateur radio operator, was proficient in Morse code, and built ham radios.

Bloomberg's fortune is managed by Willett Advisors, an investment firm that serves as his family office.

== Awards and honors ==
Bloomberg has received honorary degrees from Tufts University (2007), Bard College (2007), Rockefeller University (2007), the University of Pennsylvania (2008), Fordham University (2009), Williams College (2014), Harvard University (2014), the University of Michigan (2016), Villanova University (2017), and Washington University in St. Louis (2019).

Bloomberg was the speaker for Princeton University's 2011 baccalaureate service.

On May 27, 2010, Bloomberg delivered the commencement speech at his alma mater, Johns Hopkins University. In addition, he was invited to and delivered guest remarks for the Johns Hopkins Class of 2020. Other notable guest speakers during the virtual ceremony included Reddit co-founder and Commencement speaker Alexis Ohanian; Anthony Fauci, director of the National Institute of Allergy and Infectious Diseases and a leading member of the White House Coronavirus Task Force; and senior class president Pavan Patel In 2022, Bloomberg was awarded the Asia Game Changer Award.

Bloomberg has received the Yale School of Management's Award for Distinguished Leadership in Global Capital Markets (2003); Golden Plate Award of the American Academy of Achievement presented by Ehud Barak (2004); Barnard College's Barnard Medal of Distinction (2008); the Robert Wood Johnson Foundation Leadership for Healthy Communities' Healthy Communities Leadership Award (2009); and the Jefferson Awards Foundation's U.S. Senator John Heinz Award for Greatest Public Service by an Elected or Appointed Official (2010). He was the inaugural laureate of the annual Genesis Prize for Jewish values in 2013, and donated the $1 million prize money to a global competition, the Genesis Generation Challenge, to identify young adults' big ideas to better the world.

Bloomberg was named the 39th most influential person in the world in the 2007 and 2008 Time 100. In 2009, Bloomberg was awarded the Lasker Award. In 2010, Vanity Fair ranked him #7 in its "Vanity Fair 100" list of influential figures.

Bloomberg received a Lifetime Achievement award from the Webby Awards in 2012. In 2013, the Tony Awards gave Bloomberg the Excellence in Theatre Award.

In 2014, Queen Elizabeth II appointed Bloomberg an Honorary Knight Commander of the Order of the British Empire for his "prodigious entrepreneurial and philanthropic endeavors, and the many ways in which they have benefited the United Kingdom and the U.K.-U.S. special relationship." The League of Conservation Voters awarded Bloomberg the Lifetime Achievement Award in 2018. He was the recipient of the Heyman Service to America Medal in 2019.

In 2024, President Joe Biden awarded Bloomberg the Presidential Medal of Freedom, the Nation's highest civilian honor.

In January 2025 Bloomberg was awarded the Department of the Navy Distinguished Public Service Award.

In March 2025, Time Magazine awarded Bloomberg the Earth Award for his ongoing environmental work including the closure of 300 coal-fired power plants across America, a 20% reduction in N.Y.'s emissions, and donating over $1 billion to climate causes.

== Books and other works ==
Bloomberg, with Matthew Winkler, wrote an autobiography, Bloomberg by Bloomberg, published in 1997 by Wiley. A second edition was released in 2019, ahead of Bloomberg's presidential run. Bloomberg and former Sierra Club Executive Director Carl Pope co-authored Climate of Hope: How Cities, Businesses, and Citizens Can Save the Planet (2017), published by St. Martin's Press; the book appeared on the New York Times hardcover nonfiction best-seller list. Bloomberg has written a number of op-eds in The New York Times about various issues, including an op-ed supporting state and local efforts to fight climate change (2017), an op-ed about his donation of $1.8 billion in financial aid for college students and support for need-blind admission policies (2018); an op-ed supporting a ban on flavored e-cigarettes (2019); and an op-ed supporting policies to reduce economic inequality (2020).

== See also ==
- List of Harvard University people
- List of Johns Hopkins University people
- List of people from Boston
- List of philanthropists
- List of richest American politicians
- List of American politicians who switched parties in office
- Timeline of New York City, 2000s–2010s

Business positions
New office	Chief executive officer of Bloomberg L.P. 1981–2001	Succeeded by Lex Fenwick
Preceded by Daniel L. Doctoroff	Chief executive officer of Bloomberg L.P. 2014–2023	Incumbent
Party political offices
Preceded by Rudy Giuliani	Republican nominee for Mayor of New York City; 2001, 2005, 2009 (Endorsed)	Succeeded by Joe Lhota
Political offices
Preceded by Rudy Giuliani	Mayor of New York City; 2002–2013	Succeeded by Bill de Blasio
Other offices
Preceded by Mark Sirangelo	Chair of the Defense Innovation Board; 2022–present	Incumbent
