= Eugen Leo =

German medical research scientist (born 1965)

- Born: December 27, 1965 (age 60); Freiburg im Breisgau
- Citizenship: German
- Education: Albert Ludwigs University of Freiburg (MD), Heidelberg University (MD-PhD – "Habilitation"), Colorado State University (MBA)

Eugen Leo (born December 27, 1965) is a clinician-scientist and professor of medicine of German origin with a focus on development of novel immunotherapies for cancer.

== Early life and education ==
Leo was born in Freiburg im Breisgau and attended the Thomas-Strittmatter-Gymnasium in St.Georgen (Black Forest region). He then completed his civil service and studied medicine at the Albert-Ludwigs-University in Freiburg, where he received his medical doctor degree in 1994. Part of his studies also took place at Rheinisch-Westfälische Technische Hochschule Aachen, the University of Münster, and the University of Cincinnati. He also received a master of business administration from Colorado State University in 2006.

== Professional career ==
He began his medical residency training in the Department of Hematology and Medical Oncology at Freiburg University Medical Center in 1994. Having been awarded a scholarship for cancer research by Deutsche Forschungsgemeinschaft (DFG; German Research Foundation), he completed a postdoctoral research period at the Sanford-Burnham-Prebys Medical Research Institute between 1996 and 2000 in the lab of John C. Reed.

In 2003, Leo switched his professional focus from academia to industry-based cancer research and drug development. Between 2003 and 2005, he led as medical director and vice president at Micromet AG in Munich the clinical development of the BiTE platform, a bispecific T cell engaging immunotherapy, based upon the fundamental research work of Gert Riethmüller and Peter Kufer. Leo conceived the continuous infusion concept for BiTEs and based upon this concept blinatumomab (AMG103/MT103/Blincyto, a CD19xCD3 bispecific antibody and Micromet's lead development program) reached clinical proof-of-concept after three prior phase 1 trials had failed to do so. The data of this proof-of-concept trial were published in the journal SCIENCE in 2008. This work contributed to Micromet's acquisition by Amgen in 2012 and the accelerated approval of Blincyto in 2014 by the FDA.

In 2005, he joined Johnson & Johnson's Phase I/II clinical development group within the Research and Early Development Team (RED) as a member of the Oncology Therapeutic Area Leadership Team. In 2008, he became the global head of early clinical development oncology at Merck KGaA. From 2009 to 2017, Leo held leading roles in different biotechnology companies, working on experimental cancer (immuno-)therapies, including antibodies, antibody-drug conjugates, antisense oligonucleotides, kinase inhibitors and T-cell receptor therapies. He contributed to the development of AC220/quizartinib (Vanflyta; Ambit Biosciences, approved by FDA in 2023), ISTH-0036 (Isarna Therapeutics), and ICT01 (Imcheck Therapeutics), an anti-Butyrophilin-3A antibody that activates γ9δ2 T cells. From 2015 to 2017, he was chief medical officer of Rigontec GmbH and oversaw clinical development of the innate immune activator RGT-100, which was acquired by Merck Inc. in 2017.

From 2018 on, he led as chief medical officer the clinical development of the GDF-15 neutralizing antibody visugromab (CTL-002) at Catalym GmbH, with the first-in-human trial demonstrating that visugromab can reverse anti-PD-1/PD-L1 relapsed/refractory status in cancer patients. Treatment with visugromab, in combination with the anti-PD1 antibody nivolumab achieved in this trial in some metastatic solid tumor patients that had exhausted all their available treatment options (including prior anti-PD1/-L1 treatment) lasting, complete tumor remissions. The results of the trial (termed GDFATHER, for GDF-15 antibody-mediated human effector cell relocation) were published in the journal NATURE in 2024.

== Personal life ==
He lives in Germany and is a long-term member of SC Freiburg football club and the Freiburg Cathedral Construction Association ("Münsterbauverein"), who appointed him as a cathedral steward ("Münsterpfleger").
