= Yanxun Xu =

Chinese-American statistician

Yanxun Xu is a Chinese and American statistician. Her research applies Bayesian statistics to high-dimensional and complex data from genomics and electronic health records, and integrates generative AI with statistical analysis of this data; she has also applied statistics in materials science, to the classification of carbon nanostructures. She is a professor and Joseph & Suzanne Jenniches Faculty Scholar in the Whiting School of Engineering at Johns Hopkins University, in its Department of Applied Mathematics and Statistics, and also holds an adjunct appointment in the Division of Biostatistics and Bioinformatics of the Sidney Kimmel Comprehensive Cancer Center, part of the Johns Hopkins School of Medicine.

== Education and career ==
Xu studied mathematics and applied mathematics at Beihang University, graduating with a bachelor's degree in 2007. After a 2010 master's degree in statistics, with a minor in economics, from Texas Tech University, she continued her studies at Rice University in Texas. Her 2013 doctoral dissertation, Application of Bayesian Modeling in High-throughput Genomic Data and Clinical Trial Design, was advised by Yuan Ji.

Next, she became a postdoctoral researcher at the University of Texas at Austin from 2013 to 2015. She joined the Johns Hopkins University Department of Applied Mathematics and Statistics as an assistant professor in 2015, and was promoted to associate professor and Joseph & Suzanne Jenniches Faculty Scholar in 2022, at that time adding her affiliation with the Johns Hopkins School of Medicine. She became a full professor in 2026.

== Recognition ==
Xu was elected as a Fellow of the American Statistical Association in 2026.
