= Suzanne L. Topalian =

American physician

Suzanne Topalian
- Born: 1954 (age 71–72); Alpine, New Jersey
- Spouse: Drew Pardoll (m. 1993)
- Awards: Nature's 10 (2014)

Academic background
- Education: BA, English, Wellesley College; MD, 1979, Tufts University School of Medicine

Academic work
- Institutions: Johns Hopkins University School of Medicine; National Cancer Institute

Suzanne Louise Topalian (born 1954) is an American surgical oncologist. She is the Bloomberg-Kimmel Professor of Cancer Immunotherapy in the Bloomberg-Kimmel Institute for Cancer Immunotherapy at Johns Hopkins University School of Medicine. In this role, she studies human anti-tumor immunity.

== Early life and education ==
Topalian was born to father Malcolm F. Topalian in Alpine, New Jersey. Her father was the president of the Topalian Trading Company, a rug concern in New York. She played piano growing up and won first prize in a Tri-State competition. Upon graduating from high school, Topalian received her undergraduate degree from Wellesley College and her medical degree from Tufts University School of Medicine in 1979. She then completed her residency in general surgery at the Thomas Jefferson University Hospital in Philadelphia under the guidance of Surgical Residency Director Herbert Cohn. Following this, she held two fellowships at both the Children's Hospital of Philadelphia and National Cancer Institute (NCI).

== Career ==
Upon completing her fellowship at NCI in 1989, Topalian intended to leave but was persuaded to stay and work with tumor immunologist Steven Rosenberg. She remained at the institute's Surgery Branch for 21 years before joining the faculty at Johns Hopkins University to lead the Melanoma Program in the Sidney Kimmel Comprehensive Cancer Center. Her work with the program led to a landmark publication in 2012 showing that nivolumab (Opdivo) produced dramatic responses in people with advanced melanoma and in those with lung cancer. Following this study, Topalian also found that the drug Opdivo caused some patients to have lasting responses that continued even after stopping the drug. She was later named one of Nature's 10 in 2014 for her ability to establish immunotherapy as an important treatment modality in cancer.

As the Director of the Melanoma Program, Topalian researches modulating immune checkpoints such as PD-1 and PD-L1 in cancer therapy, and discovering biomarkers predicting clinical outcomes following treatment. In 2015, she was the recipient of the David Karnofsky Memorial Award for her contributions to the research of cancer. The following year, Topalian returned to her original research on Opdivo and found that over one-third of advanced melanoma patients were still alive five years after starting therapy with the cancer drug. While continuing to study human anti-tumor immunity, Topalian was elected to the American Association of Physicians and named the co-recipient of the Taubman Prize Awarded for Ground-Breaking Work in Cancer Immunotherapy. In October 2017, Topalian was elected to the National Academy of Medicine as someone who has "made major contributions to the advancement of the medical sciences, health care and public health."

In 2018, Topalian was appointed the Bloomberg-Kimmel Professor of Cancer Immunotherapy in the Bloomberg-Kimmel Institute for Cancer Immunotherapy. She was also elected to serve on Dragonfly Therapeutics, Inc.'s Scientific Advisory Board.

== Personal life ==
Topalian married Drew Pardoll in 1993.
