= Albert H. Owens Jr. =

American medical researcher

- Born: August 27, 1926
- Died: January 13, 2017 (aged 90)
- Education: Johns Hopkins University; Johns Hopkins University School of Medicine
- Scientific career
- Fields: oncology
- Workplaces: Johns Hopkins University School of Medicine

Albert H. Owens, Jr. (August 27, 1926 – January 13, 2017) was the director of the Johns Hopkins Oncology Center in Baltimore, MD.

Owens earned his undergraduate degree from Johns Hopkins University and graduated from Johns Hopkins University School of Medicine in 1949.

Owens joined the faculty at Johns Hopkins University School of Medicine in 1956, and focused his research on liver metabolism. In 1973, he became the first director of the Johns Hopkins Oncology Center, which was later named the Sidney Kimmel Comprehensive Cancer Center. He became president of Johns Hopkins Hospital in 1987. After a year and a half, he left this position to focus on developing the cancer center.
