= Kenneth J. Pienta =

Medical oncologist, medical researcher

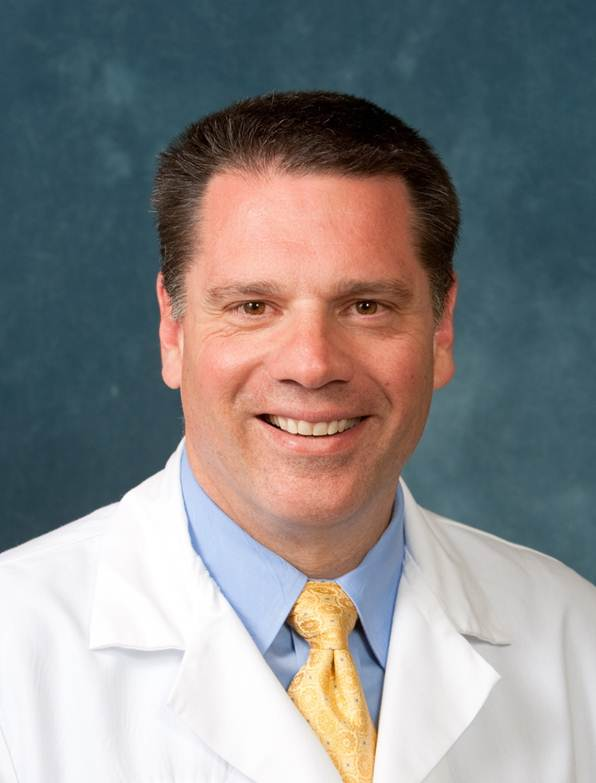
- Education: Johns Hopkins University
- Scientific career
- Workplaces: Johns Hopkins University School of Medicine

Kenneth J. Pienta is a medical doctor and the Donald S. Coffey professor of urology and professor of oncology and pharmacology and molecular sciences at the Johns Hopkins University School of Medicine. He also serves as the director of research at the Brady Urological Institute.

Pienta attended the University of Michigan as an undergraduate, before ultimately receiving a Bachelor's degree from the Johns Hopkins University in 1983. He stayed at Johns Hopkins to earn his MD in 1986. After medical school, he completed his residency at the University of Chicago Hospital.

His lab focuses on researching the tumor microenvironment and its role in metastasis.

In 2007, he was a recipient of the AACR Team Science Award for the group discovery of fusion genes in prostate cancer.

He is a member of the editorial board of the Cancer and Metastasis Reviews.
