= Political positions of Michael Bloomberg =

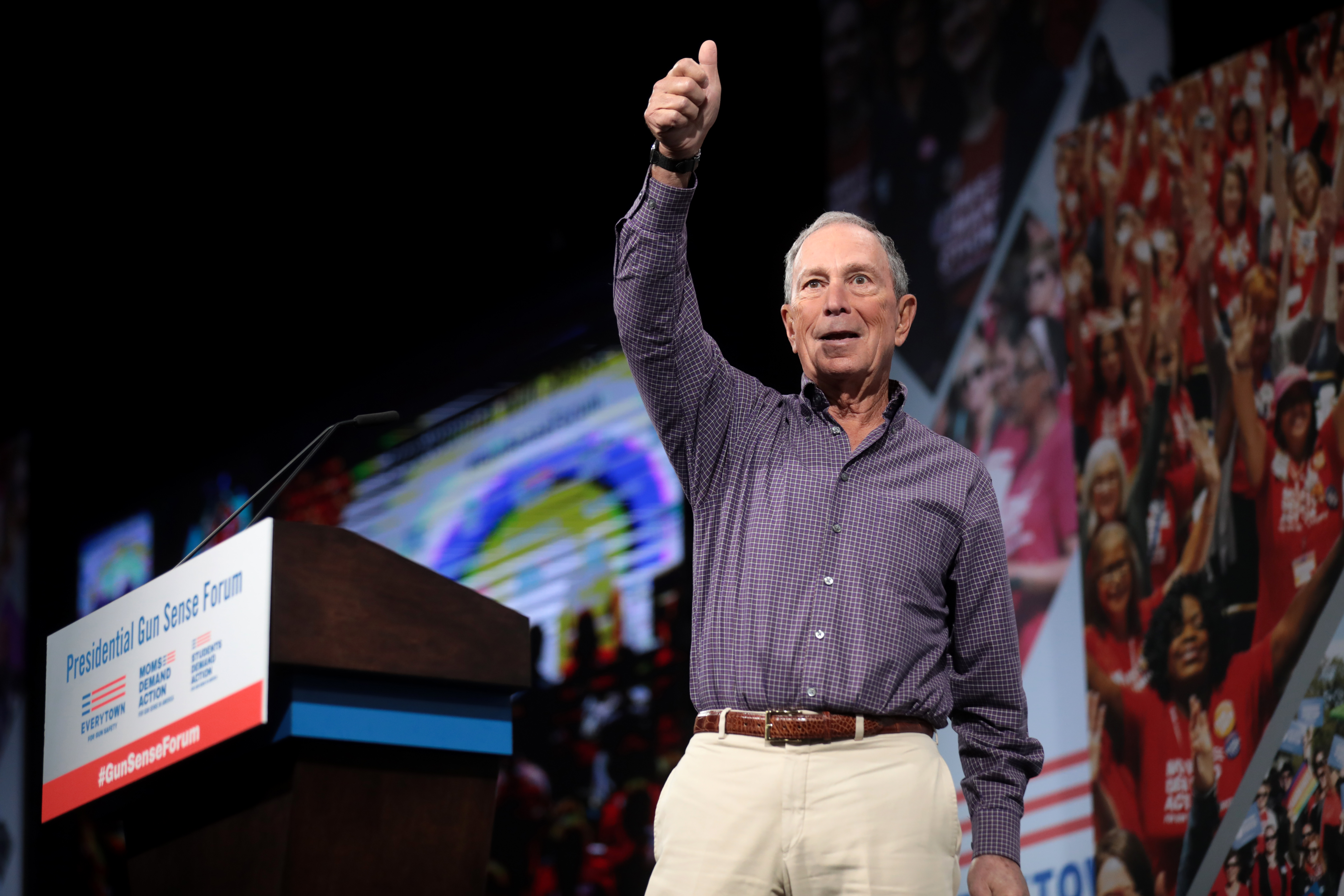
Bloomberg delivering a campaign speech during a 2019 rally

Michael Bloomberg (born February 14, 1942) is an American politician, businessman, and author. He is the co-founder, CEO, and majority owner of Bloomberg L.P. Bloomberg was the mayor of New York City from 2002 to 2013. He was a candidate in the Democratic Party primaries for the 2020 United States presidential election.

Bloomberg was a life-long Democrat until 2001, when he switched to the Republican Party before running for mayor. He became independent in 2007, and registered again as a Democrat in October 2018.

In 2004, he endorsed the re-election of George W. Bush, and spoke at the 2004 Republican National Convention. In 2012, he endorsed the re-election of President Barack Obama. Bloomberg endorsed Hillary Clinton in the 2016 election, and spoke at the 2016 Democratic National Convention. When he dropped out of the 2020 Democratic presidential primaries, he endorsed the eventual nominee, Joe Biden. Bloomberg's political stances can be defined as technocratic.

== Crime and punishment ==
=== Gun rights ===
In April 2006, along with Boston mayor Thomas Menino, Bloomberg co-founded Mayors Against Illegal Guns. A December 2013 press release by the group said the bipartisan coalition included over 1,000 mayors. In 2014, the organization merged with Moms Demand Action For Gun Sense in America to form Everytown for Gun Safety, which in 2018 in collaboration with student groups organized the March For Our Lives. When asked in an April 2014 interview why he was devoting so many of his personal resources to supporting gun control, restrictive food choice, and smoking cessation, his concern was about his mortality, replying: "I am telling you if there is a God, when I get to heaven, I'm not stopping to be interviewed. I am heading straight in. I have earned my place in heaven. It's not even close."

As mayor, Bloomberg increased the mandatory minimum sentence for illegal possession of a loaded handgun, saying: "Illegal guns don't belong on our streets, and we're sending that message loud and clear. We're determined to see that gun dealers who break the law are held accountable, and that criminals who carry illegal loaded guns serve serious time behind bars." He opposes the death penalty, saying he would "rather lock somebody up and throw away the key and put them in hard labor". He has called the death penalty "murder by the state".

=== Stop-and-frisk ===
Bloomberg was a staunch proponent of stop-and-frisk in New York City, and has argued that it lowered the murder rate. The manner in which the NYPD utilized the practice was ruled unconstitutional in 2013, but the practice itself was not deemed unconstitutional. There is no evidence that the practice reduced the crime rate. New York City did not see an increase in violent or property crime following the end of stop-and-frisk, and in fact experienced lower murder rates after the policy was scaled back in 2013.

In June 2013, Bloomberg pushed back against accusations that the stop-and-frisk practice disproportionately targeted minorities. Bloomberg argued that the demographic data of police stops should be assessed based on suspects' descriptions and not the population as a whole, saying, "it's not a disproportionate percentage of those who witnesses and victims describe as committing the [crime]. In that case, incidentally, I think we disproportionately stop whites too much and minorities too little."

In 2015, Bloomberg defended New York City's stop-and-frisk practices, saying:

Ninety-five percent of murders- murderers and murder victims fit one M.O. You can just take the description, Xerox it, and pass it out to all the cops. They are male, minorities, 16-25. That's true in New York, that's true in virtually every city (inaudible). And that's where the real crime is. You’ve got to get the guns out of the hands of people that are getting killed. So you want to spend the money on a lot of cops in the streets. Put those cops where the crime is, which means in minority neighborhoods. So one of the unintended consequences is people say, ‘Oh my God, you are arresting kids for marijuana that are all minorities.’ Yes, that's true. Why? Because we put all the cops in minority neighborhoods. Yes, that's true. Why do we do it? Because that's where all the crime is. And the way you get the guns out of the kids’ hands is to throw them up against the wall and frisk them... And then they start... ‘Oh I don't want to get caught.’ So they don't bring the gun. They still have a gun, but they leave it at home.

— Michael Bloomberg, speech to the Aspen Institute, February 2015

However, in 2018, Bloomberg walked back his stance on stop-and-frisk, saying, "The history of the decline in police stops is misunderstood. As crime hit historic lows, and more than a year before any court ruling, I pledged to a Sunday congregation in Brooklyn and to all New Yorkers that 'we must and will do better' by reforming police practices while continuing to drive down crime. And that's exactly what we did, on our own accord. We cut police stops by 94 percent, while continuing to reduce crime and incarceration." On November 17, 2019, while speaking in Brooklyn's non-denominational Christian Cultural Center, Bloomberg renounced his previous support for stop-and-frisk, and issued an apology. New York Mayor Bill de Blasio responded to Bloomberg's apology by stating: "This is LONG overdue, and the timing is transparent and cynical." Police Benevolent Association President Patrick Lynch also criticized Bloomberg's apology, noting in a statement that, "We said in the early 2000s that the quota-driven emphasis on street stops was polluting the relationship between cops and our communities", and that the "[Bloomberg] administration's misguided policy inspired an anti-police movement that has made cops the target of hatred and violence, and stripped away many of the tools we had used to keep New Yorkers safe".

== Economic issues ==
=== Agriculture ===
Bloomberg supports an increase in spending on research and development by over $100 billion through agencies including the Department of Defense and National Institutes of Health to invest in manufacturing and agriculture.

Bloomberg supports investing in federal apprenticeship programs to provide retraining for rural workers whose jobs may be affected due to the increasing reliance on technology and automation. During a 2016 appearance at a University of Oxford Distinguished Speaker Series, Bloomberg elaborated on the educational disparity and inequality between rural and white-collar workers, saying:

I could teach anybody — even people in this room, no offense intended — to be a farmer. It's a [process]. You dig a hole, you put a seed in, you put dirt on top, add water, up comes the corn. You could learn that. Then you have 300 years of the industrial society. You put the piece of metal on the lathe, you turn the crank in the direction of the arrow and you can have a job. And we created a lot of jobs. [At] one point, 98% of the world worked in agriculture, today it's 2%, in the United States. Now comes the information economy. And the information economy is fundamentally different because it's built around replacing people with technology, and the skill sets that you have to learn are how to think and analyze. And that is a whole degree level different. You have to have a different skill set, you have to have a lot more gray matter.

— Michael Bloomberg, speaking at University of Oxford Saïd Business School, November 17, 2016

=== Housing ===
As mayor, Bloomberg launched a program called Opportunity NYC, the nation's first-ever conditional cash transfer pilot program, designed to help New Yorkers break the cycle of poverty in the city. He instituted a $7.5 billion municipal affordable housing plan, the largest in the nation, that is supposed to provide 500,000 New Yorkers with housing.

Bloomberg blamed the subprime mortgage crisis and 2008 economic downturn on policies implemented by Congress. In a 2008 speech at Georgetown University, he cited government housing policies intended to reduce the effects of redlining as a contributing factor in the housing crisis, saying:

It all started back when there was a lot of pressure on banks to make loans to everyone. Redlining, if you remember, was the term where banks took whole neighborhoods and said, ‘People in these neighborhoods are poor, they’re not going to be able to pay off their mortgages, tell your salesmen don’t go into those areas.’ And then Congress got involved -- local elected officials, as well -- and said, ‘Oh that’s not fair, these people should be able to get credit.’ And once you started pushing in that direction, banks started making more and more loans where the credit of the person buying the house wasn’t as good as you would like.

— Michael Bloomberg, Speech at Georgetown University, September 2008

=== Preservation and development issues ===
Bloomberg is a proponent of large-scale development. He has repeatedly supported projects such as the Pacific Park mega-development, the Hudson Yards Redevelopment and associated rail-yard development (even supporting a subway extension to Hudson Yards), and the Harlem rezoning proposal. On smaller-scale issues, Bloomberg usually takes the side of development as well. He favors the demolition of Admiral's Row to build a supermarket parking lot. However, Bloomberg has occasionally sided with preservation, most notably in vetoing landmark revocation for the Austin Nichols warehouse. This move was widely applauded by architectural historians. The City Council overruled the veto shortly thereafter, however.

=== Taxation ===
Bloomberg has characterized himself in the past as a fiscal conservative for turning New York City's $6 billion deficit into a $3 billion surplus. He did so by raising property taxes and making cuts to city agencies.

Being a fiscal conservative is not about slashing programs that help the poor, or improve health care, or ensure a social safety net. It's about insisting services are provided efficiently, get to only the people that need them, and achieve the desired results. Fiscal conservatives have hearts too – but we also insist on using our brains, and that means demanding results and holding government accountable for producing them. To me, fiscal conservatism means balancing budgets – not running deficits that the next generation can't afford. It means improving the efficiency of delivering services by finding innovative ways to do more with less. It means cutting taxes when possible and prudent to do so, raising them overall only when necessary to balance the budget, and only in combination with spending cuts. It means when you run a surplus, you save it; you don't squander it. And most importantly, being a fiscal conservative means preparing for the inevitable economic downturns – and by all indications, we've got one coming.

— Michael Bloomberg, speech at Conservative Party Conference (UK), September 30, 2007

Bloomberg has expressed a distaste for taxes, stating, "Taxes are not good things, but if you want services, somebody's got to pay for them, so they're a necessary evil." As mayor, he did raise property taxes to fund budget projects; however, in January 2007, he proposed cuts in property taxes by five percent and cuts in sales taxes, including the elimination of taxes on clothing and footwear. Bloomberg pointed to the Wall Street profits and the real estate market as evidence that the city's economy is booming and could handle a tax break.

Bloomberg is in favor of providing tax breaks to big corporations to promote economic growth. As mayor, Bloomberg lobbied the CEO of Goldman Sachs to establish its headquarters across from Ground Zero by promising $1.65 billion in tax breaks. Regarding this deal, Bloomberg stated, "This [New York City] is where the best want to live and work. So I told him [CEO of Goldman Sachs], 'We can help with minimizing taxes. Minimizing your rent. Improving security. But in the end, this is about people.'"

=== Trade ===
Bloomberg is a staunch advocate of free trade, and is strongly opposed to protectionism, stating, "The things that we have to worry about is this protectionist movement that has reared its head again in this country. ..." He worries about the growth of China, and fears the lessening gap between the United States and other countries. "The rest of the world is catching up, and, there are people that say, surpassing us. I hope they are wrong. I hope those who think we are still in good shape are right. But nevertheless, the time to address these issues is right now."

=== Unions ===
Bloomberg had less cordial relations with unions as mayor. In 2002, when New York City's transit workers threatened to strike, Bloomberg responded by riding a mountain bike through the city to show how the city could deal with the transit strike by finding alternate means of transportation and not pandering to the unions. Three years later, a clash over wages and union benefits led to a three-day strike. Negotiations led to the end of the strike in December 2005.

In 2013, Bloomberg compared the leadership of the United Federation of Teachers to the National Rifle Association of America (NRA), saying "The NRA's another place where the membership, if you do the polling, doesn't agree with the leadership." The same year, he made a similar comparison to the NRA and the New York Civil Liberties Union when defending the city's stop-and-frisk policy, saying "We don't need extremists on the left or the right running our police department, whether it's the NRA or the NYCLU."

== Education ==
Bloomberg replaced New York City's school board set up by the state of New York with a set-up providing direct mayoral control over public education. This was criticized by some, such as former U.S. Assistant Secretary of Education Diane Ravitch, who has argued that mayoral control led to further privatization of education. Bloomberg states that he raised the salaries of teachers by fifteen percent while boosting test scores and graduation rates. Some, such as the United Federation of Teachers, dispute these claims, criticizing Bloomberg for including things that do not show up on a paycheck, such as increased spending on teachers' pensions and healthcare, which they say inflate the amount teachers' salaries were raised; they also accuse him of exaggerating the boost in graduation rates and the role his administration played in it, pointing out that New York City's graduation rates still far lagged behind the rest of New York State.

Bloomberg opposes social promotion, stating that students should be promoted only when they are adequately prepared for the next grade level. Some educators disagree, however, arguing that leaving children behind stigmatizes them as failures, only to face failure again as they repeat the grade. He favors after-school programs to help students who are behind. As mayor, Bloomberg strengthened the cellphone ban in schools. In Los Angeles, Bloomberg waded into the controversy over the proliferation of charter schools, donating over $1 million to elect pro-charter school board candidates opposed by United Teachers of Los Angeles (UTLA).

== Environment ==
During his second term as the mayor of New York City, Bloomberg unveiled PlaNYC: A Greener, Greater New York on April 22, 2007, to fight global warming, protect the environment and prepare for the projected 1 million additional people expected to be living in the city by the year 2030.

Under PlaNYC, in just six years New York City reduced citywide greenhouse gas emissions by 19% since 2005 and was on track to achieve a 30% reduction ahead of the PlaNYC 2030 goal. In October 2007, as part of PlaNYC, Bloomberg launched the Million Trees NYC initiative, which aimed to plant and care for one million trees throughout the city in the next decade. In November 2015, New York City planted its one millionth tree, two years ahead of the original 10-year schedule.

In 2008, Bloomberg convened the New York City Panel on Climate Change (NPCC), an effort to prepare the city for global warming (climate change). Bloomberg has been involved in motivating other cities to make changes and has spoken about reducing carbon dioxide emissions, using cleaner and more efficient fuels, using congestion pricing in New York City, and encouraging public transportation.

Bloomberg unveiled the Special Initiative for Rebuilding and Resiliency (SIRR) in June 2013, after the city was affected by Hurricane Sandy in October 2012. The $20 billion initiative laid out extensive plans to protect New York City against future effects of global warming. The plan was cultivated by Cisco DeVries, the chief of staff to Berkeley's mayor and then-CEO of RenewableFunding and Matthew Brown of Lestis Private Capital Group. On September 26, 2013, Bloomberg announced that his administration's air pollution reduction efforts had resulted in the best air quality in New York City in more than 50 years. The majority of the air quality improvement was attributed to the phasing out of heavy polluting heating oils through New York's "Clean Heat" program. As a result of the improved air quality, the average life expectancy of New Yorkers had increased three years during Bloomberg's tenure, compared to 1.8 years in the rest of the country.

By 2017, Bloomberg donated $100 million to the campaign Beyond Coal, that helped close over half of the US coal power stations, since 2011 when it was expanded due to his financial help. In 2017 he donated $64 million more, the day after EPA head Scott Pruitt began to abolish President Barack Obama's Clean Power Plan.

In 2019, Bloomberg, with the Sierra Club and other organizations, launched "Beyond Carbon," an initiative to complete the USA's transition to non-fossil energy sources. Bloomberg and former California Governor Jerry Brown launched and are leading America's Pledge, a coalition of cities, businesses, states and more in the US to reduce greenhouse gas emissions. The organization covers 68% of the GDP and 65% of the population of the United States. In COP25 it presented a report named "ACCELERATING AMERICA'S PLEDGE," in which it stated that already existing commitments can cut USA greenhouse gas emissions by 19% by 2025 and by 25% by 2030. Accelerating local action can lower emissions by 37% by the year 2030, and if federal support will be adjusted, by 49% by the same year relative to the level of the year 2005.

== Foreign policy ==
As mayor, Bloomberg made trips to Mexico, the United Kingdom, Ireland, and Israel in the first four months of 2007. In late 2007, he conducted an Asia trip that brought him to China, where he called for greater freedom of information to promote innovation. He attended the 2007 United Nations Climate Change Conference in Bali.

=== China ===
In September 2019, Bloomberg said that the autocratic ruling party of China, the Communist Party, "listens to the public" on issues such as pollution. In January 2020, Bloomberg came out in favor of sanctions on Chinese officials for "human rights violations in both Hong Kong and Xinjiang".

=== Iraq ===
In 2003, Bloomberg strongly supported the war in Iraq, and the rationale for going in. He stated, "Don't forget that the war started not very many blocks from here", alluding to Ground Zero. In regard to the global war on terrorism, including Iraq, he said: "It's not only to protect Americans. It's America's responsibility to protect people around the world who want to be free." During the 2004 presidential election campaign, New York City hosted the Republican National Convention where Bloomberg endorsed President George W. Bush for President of the United States. In 2005, Bloomberg spoke out against creating a timeline for withdrawing troops from Iraq, calling Congressional Democrats who supported withdrawing troops "irresponsible". Later in 2005, he said: "I think everybody has very mixed emotions about the war that was started to find weapons of mass destruction, and then they were not found."

== Health ==
=== Health insurance ===
Bloomberg supports adding a public health insurance option for those who do not have access to insurance. In 2009, Bloomberg wrote an op-Ed for the New York Daily News in support of a public option. In 2010, Bloomberg criticized the Affordable Care Act, saying that it would do "absolutely nothing to fix the big health care problems". Bloomberg has since advocated for preserving and expanding the program. In a 2017 interview, Bloomberg praised the concept of single-payer health care, but conceded that "the politics of single payer do not work at the moment, but maybe someday people will look at it differently".

=== Public health regulations ===
On December 5, 2006, New York City under Bloomberg became the first city in the United States to ban trans fat from all restaurants. This went into effect in July 2008.

In 2012, the NYC Board of Health approved Bloomberg's proposal to ban the sale of many sweetened drinks more than 16 ounces (473ml) in volume. The limit would have applied to businesses such as restaurants and movie theaters but did not apply to grocery stores, including 7-Eleven. Diet varieties of sweetened drinks were unaffected.

On March 12, 2013, hours before the ban was scheduled to take effect, State Supreme Court Justice Milton Tingling struck it down, ruling that the Board of Health lacked the jurisdiction to enforce it and that the rule was "arbitrary and capricious". The city appealed the decision. On July 30, the Appellate Division upheld the lower court's ruling, stating the Board of Health "failed to act within the bounds of its lawfully delegated authority" and the ban was a violation of the separation of powers doctrine, which reserves legislative power to the legislature and does not allow the board to "exercise sweeping power to create whatever rule they deem necessary". Bloomberg announced that the city would appeal the decision.

Bloomberg has been criticized for some of his policies which have been described by many as facilitating the creation of a nanny state. Comedian Bill Maher, while on Jimmy Kimmel Live, said that Bloomberg's soda ban "gives liberals a bad name". In response to the soda ban, The Center for Consumer Freedom ran a full-page ad in The New York Times featuring an image of Bloomberg's face superimposed on an elderly female body wearing a dress and scarf, with the title "The Nanny", and the tagline "New Yorkers Need a Mayor, Not a Nanny." Others have pointed out that the smoking rate dropped quickly during Bloomberg's time in office (which has involved the banning of smoking in certain areas).

Criticism of Bloomberg's attempt to ban the sale of large soft drinks was picked up, mostly by Republican and libertarian commentators and politicians, as a line of attack in political campaigns around the United States. In one example, Virginia Attorney General Ken Cuccinelli and Kentucky Senator Rand Paul brought Big Gulps to a joint appearance for Cuccinelli's ultimately unsuccessful 2013 gubernatorial campaign to symbolize Bloomberg's efforts to restrict soft drink sales, criticizing the mayor for wanting "to buy the governor's office down here", a reference to pro-gun control advertisements his political action committee was running in the state. Republican legislators in Wisconsin reacted to the ban by inserting language to prohibit communities from restricting the sale of large soft drinks throughout the state in a 2013 budget bill.

In 2013, as New York mayor, Bloomberg launched a number of anti-tobacco and anti-smoking initiatives, including making cigarettes more expensive through taxation and attempted provisions that stores which sell cigarettes hide them out of sight of consumers. In September 2019 Bloomberg Philanthropies announced a $160 million initiative to "end the youth e-cigarette epidemic". In 2020, Bloomberg said that he would like to ban the sale of flavored electronic cigarettes, raise taxes on cigarettes, push to reduce levels of nicotine in these products to "non-addictive levels", and require that health insurance companies cover counseling and smoking cessation medicines for smokers trying to quit without copays or limits on treatment if he became president.

== Immigration ==
Bloomberg has criticized those who advocate for mass deportation of illegal immigrants, calling their stance unrealistic: "We're not going to deport 12 million people; so, let's stop this fiction. Let's give them permanent status." He supports a federal ID database that uses DNA and fingerprint technology, to keep track of all citizens and to verify their legal status. Bloomberg has held that illegal immigrants should be offered legalization, and supported the congressional efforts of John McCain and Ted Kennedy in their attempt at immigration reform in 2007.

Regarding border security, he compared it to the tide, stating: "It's as if we expect border control agents to do what a century of communism could not: defeat the natural market forces of supply and demand ... and defeat the natural human desire for freedom and opportunity. You might as well as sit in your beach chair and tell the tide not to come in. As long as America remains a nation dedicated to the proposition that 'all Men are created equal, endowed by their Creator with certain unalienable Rights, that among these are Life, Liberty, and the pursuit of Happiness', people from near and far will continue to seek entry into our country."

In 2006, Bloomberg stated on his weekly WABC radio show that illegal immigration does not strain the financial resources of New York City, since many immigrants are hard-working and "do not avail themselves of services until their situation is dire".

== National security ==
=== Surveillance ===
Bloomberg supported the use of surveillance to combat terrorism. In 2008, Bloomberg spearheaded the Lower Manhattan Security Initiative, a security and surveillance network designed to detect terrorist threats. The initiative spearheaded the installation of over 3,000 new security cameras in Lower Manhattan, as well as 100 automatic number plate recognition devices which are intended to scan plates and compare the numbers with information in a database. Bloomberg acknowledged advocacy groups' concerns about privacy, but insisted that the surveillance network was necessary to boost safety, saying: "We just have to do something here to make the city safer. Sadly, it is a little bit of an infringement on your rights."

Following the Boston Marathon bombing, Bloomberg said that laws and the interpretation of the United States Constitution have to change to provide greater security against such attacks, "the people who are worried about privacy have a legitimate worry, but we live in a complex world where you're going to have a level of security greater than you did back in the olden days, if you will ... our laws and our interpretation of the Constitution, I think, have to change."

In 2014, Bloomberg voiced support for the National Security Agency, and said that he does not have a problem with apps selling their user's personal data, explaining:

Look, if you don't want it to be in the public domain, don't take that picture, don't write it down. In this day and age, you've got to be pretty naive to believe that the NSA isn't listening to everything and reading every email. And incidentally, given how dangerous the world is, we should hope they are, because this is really serious, what's going on in the world.

— Michael Bloomberg, Speech at Vanity Fair New Establishment Summit, October 8, 2014

As mayor, Bloomberg oversaw a surveillance program that tracked Muslims in places of worship, schools, and public places in New York City. In 2020, Bloomberg defended the intelligence-gathering program, saying that it was part of a larger effort to keep the city safe from terrorism:

We sent some officers into some mosques to listen to the sermon that the imam gave... We had just lost 3,000 people at 9/11. Of course we're supposed to do that. It does not, incidentally, mean that all Muslims are terrorists or all terrorists are Muslim. But, the people that flew those airplanes came from the Middle East, and some of the imams were urging more of the same.

— Michael Bloomberg, Interview with PBS NewsHour, February 27, 2020

=== Terrorism ===
Bloomberg believes that the September 11, 2001 attacks were not intended to be solitary events. When he assumed office, he set up a Counterterrorism Bureau which works along with the NYPD intelligence division to gather information about worldwide terrorism affecting New York City. He believes that funding for Homeland Security by the federal government should be distributed by risk, where cities that are considered to have the highest threat for a terrorist attack would get the most money. Bloomberg is also a supporter of the USA PATRIOT Act.

== Social issues ==
=== Abortion ===
Bloomberg supports abortion rights, stating: "Reproductive choice is a fundamental human right, and we can never take it for granted. On this issue, you're either with us or against us." He has criticized "pro-choice" politicians who support "pro-life" candidates.

=== Circumcision ===
In September 2012, Bloomberg spearheaded a New York City law regulating the practice of circumcision among ultra-Orthodox Jews. The legislation requires that at each event, the mohel receives signed consent forms from the parents, acknowledging that they were notified of health risks associated with cleaning the wound by sucking blood from the male baby's genitalia. This regulation caused an outcry among certain Haredi Jewish communities on this alleged infringement of their religious freedom, and the matter was taken to federal court.

=== Contraception ===
In January 2011, Bloomberg introduced a pilot program in New York City schools which allowed girls over 14 years old to be provided with Plan B emergency contraception without parental consent, unless parents opt out in writing. Beginning with five schools, the pilot was expanded to thirteen schools by September 2012.

=== Drug laws ===
Bloomberg has supported the strict drug laws of New York City. He has stated that he smoked marijuana in the past, and was quoted in a 2001 interview as saying, "You bet I did. I enjoyed it." This led to a reported $500,000 advertising campaign by NORML, featuring his image and the quote. Bloomberg stated in a 2002 interview that he regretted the remark, and did not believe that marijuana should be decriminalized. In 2012, Bloomberg backed an effort by New York Governor Andrew Cuomo to decriminalize the possession of small amounts of marijuana in the state. In January 2019, Bloomberg said, "Last year, in 2017, 72,000 Americans OD'd [overdosed] on drugs. In 2018, more people than that are OD-ing on drugs, have OD'd on drugs, and today, incidentally, we are trying to legalize another addictive narcotic, which is perhaps the stupidest thing anybody has ever done." In December 2019, Bloomberg came out in favor of marijuana decriminalization, and allowing states to legalize it without federal intervention.

=== Inequality ===
Bloomberg has expressed concern about poverty and growing class divisions, stating, "This society cannot go forward, the way we have been going forward, where the gap between the rich and the poor keeps growing."

In 2011, in conjunction with the New York City Department of Youth and Community Development, Bloomberg launched the "Young Men's Initiative", a public-private initiative to provide educational, employment, and mentoring opportunities for young African-American and Latino men in New York City. In an interview with PBS NewsHour about the initiative, Bloomberg said:

The blacks and Latinos score terribly in school testing, compared to whites and Asians. If you look at our jails, it's predominantly minorities. If you look at where crime takes place, it's in the minority neighborhoods. If you look at who the victims and the perpetrators are, it's virtually all minorities. This is something that has gone on for a long time. There's this enormous cohort of black and Latino males, let's say 16 to 25, that don't have jobs, don't have any prospects, don't know how to find jobs, don't know what their skill sets are, don't know how to behave in the workplace where they have to work collaboratively and collectively.

— Michael Bloomberg, Interview with PBS NewsHour, August 2011

=== LGBT rights ===
Bloomberg supports same-sex marriage, and supported legalizing same-sex marriage in New York in 2011. Bloomberg has said that "government shouldn't tell you whom to marry".

In April 2002, Bloomberg signed a law to protect "gender identity and expression" under New York City Human Rights Law. Bloomberg has spoken out against the Trump administration's ban on transgender individuals serving in the military.

In 2016, at a panel discussion at Oxford University, Bloomberg argued that many people in the Midwest oppose transgender rights, and that it would be difficult to convince them otherwise, saying:

We, the intelligentsia, the people who could make it into this room, we believe a lot of things in terms of equality and protecting individual rights that make no sense to the vast bulk of people. They're not opposed to you having some rights, but there's a fundamental disconnect between us believe the rights of the individual come first and the general belief around the world, I think it's fair to say, that the rights of society comes first. I don't know how many of you are familiar with the bathroom issue in the United States. Anybody know what I'm talking about? If you want to know if somebody is a good salesman, give them the job of going to the Midwest and picking a town and selling to that town the concept that some man wearing a dress should be in a locker room with their daughter. If you can sell that, you can sell anything. I mean, they just look at you, and they say, 'What on earth are you talking about?' And you say, 'Well, this person identifies his or her gender as different than what's on their birth certificate.' And they say, 'What do you mean? You're either born this, or you're born that.'"... "But it's so many things that we are nuanced and the social issues that we're very proud of achieving aren't believed by the vast bulk of the people."

— Michael Bloomberg, speech at Oxford University, December 2016

In March 2019, he questioned the effectiveness of Democratic politicians campaigning on transgender rights, saying: "If your conversation during a presidential election is about some guy wearing a dress, and whether he, she, or it can go to the locker room with their daughter, that's not a winning formula for most people."

=== Stem cell research ===
Bloomberg supports governmental funding for embryonic stem cell research, calling the official Republican position on the issue "insanity".
