= William G. Nelson =

Professor at Johns Hopkins University

- Education: Yale University, Johns Hopkins University
- Known for: Prostate Cancer
- Scientific career
- Fields: Urology; Oncology
- Workplaces: Johns Hopkins University
- Website: William Nelson

William G. Nelson is the Marion I. Knott Professor of Oncology, Urology, Pharmacology, Pathology, and Medicine at the Johns Hopkins School of Medicine. He earned his B.A. in Chemistry from Yale University in 1980 and his M.D. and Ph.D. in Pharmacology from Johns Hopkins School of Medicine in 1987. His research is focused on cancer epigenetics and on new strategies for prostate cancer and prevention. He serves on the boards of the V Foundation, the Break Through Cancer Foundation, and Armis Biopharma, and on the scientific advisory boards of the Prostate Cancer Foundation, Stand Up to Cancer, and Cepheid. He was appointed as the Director of the Sidney Kimmel Comprehensive Cancer Center in 2008.
