= Drew Pardoll =

Researcher

Andrew Mark Pardoll is Director of the Bloomberg-Kimmel Institute for Cancer Immunotherapy and Abeloff Professor of Oncology, Medicine, Pathology and Molecular Biology and Genetics at Johns Hopkins University, School of Medicine. He is also Director of the Cancer Immunology Program at the Sidney Kimmel Comprehensive Cancer Center.

He was educated at Johns Hopkins University (BA, MD, PhD). He was made a fellow of the American Association for Cancer Research in 2020.

He has an h-index of 166 according to Google Scholar.

== Personal life ==
Pardoll married Suzanne L. Topalian in 1993.
