= Leadership for Healthy Communities =

American medical foundation

Based in Washington, D.C., Leadership for Healthy Communities is a $10-million national program of the Robert Wood Johnson Foundation designed to engage and support local and state government leaders nationwide in their efforts to advance public policies that support healthier communities and prevent childhood obesity. The program places an emphasis on policies with the greatest potential for increasing sustainable opportunities for physical activity and healthy eating among children at highest risk for obesity, including African-American, Latino, American Indian and Alaska Native, Asian-American and Pacific Islander children living in lower-income communities. The foundation's primary goal is the reversal of the childhood obesity epidemic by 2015.

The program awards grants to influential policy-maker organizations that provide technical assistance to state and local policy-makers who are poised to prevent childhood obesity through public policy levers. Current grantees of the national program include the American Association of School Administrators, International City/County Management Association, Local Government Commission, Council of State Governments, National Association of Counties, National Association of Latino Elected and Appointed Officials Educational Fund, National Association of State Boards of Education, National Conference of State Legislatures, National League of Cities, National School Boards Association and the U.S. Conference of Mayors. Leadership for Healthy Communities also has worked with the Congressional Black Caucus Foundation and the National Congress of American Indians to address childhood obesity in the African-American and American Indian and Alaska Native communities.

== Philosophy ==
Leadership for Healthy Communities believes that policy action can help expand opportunities for physical activity and access to healthy foods in schools and communities. The guiding principle of this program is that initiatives led by policy-makers and community leaders at all levels play an important role in supporting healthy children. By highlighting policies and programs that can impact the health of children in schools and communities, Leadership for Healthy Communities and grantees of the program encourage policy-makers to collaborate to reverse the childhood obesity epidemic and create healthier environments.

== Leadership ==
Since 2007, the Leadership for Healthy Communities national program has been led by Dr. Maya Rockeymoore Cummings. She is the CEO of the Washington, DC–based social-change policy firm, Global Policy Solutions.

== History ==
Previously known as Leadership for Active Living and then Active Living Leadership, the Leadership for Healthy Communities national program started in 2002 and was originally managed at San Diego State University. Initial support during 2002-2003 focused on five states: California, Colorado, Kentucky, Michigan and Washington. At that time, the program was primarily a partnership effort among the International City/County Management Association, the National Association of Counties, the Local Government Commission, the National Conference of State Legislatures, the National Governors Association Center for Best Practices, and the United States Conference of Mayors.

== The childhood obesity epidemic ==
Over the past four decades, obesity rates have increased rapidly among all age groups. Today, nearly one third of children and adolescents in the United States are either overweight or obese. According to a national poll, parents now rank childhood obesity as the number one potential threat to their children's health—topping drugs, alcohol and tobacco use.

Other studies have found that obese children and adolescents are much more likely to become obese adults. In fact, an obese 4-year-old has a 20 percent chance of becoming an obese adult, and an obese older teenager has up to an 80 percent chance of becoming an obese adult. In addition, obese children and adolescents are often targets of social discrimination and at greater risk for a host of other serious illnesses, including heart disease, asthma and type 2 diabetes. As more children become obese, type 2 diabetes—a disease that was once called "adult-onset diabetes" and can lead to blindness, loss of feeling and circulation in the extremities, amputations and death—is found in younger and younger age groups.

The financial consequences also are significant—obesity costs the United States $117 billion each year in direct medical expenses and indirect costs, such as lost productivity.

The medical costs of obesity outweighs the cost of eating healthy, maintaining physical activity, and educating the population for this increasing problem occurring in today's' society.

== Environmental factors that influence childhood obesity ==
Research has found that many children do not have regular opportunities to be physically active or access to healthy foods. Moreover, the environmental barriers to healthy behaviors are even larger in lower-income areas. Lower-income communities are significantly less likely to have places where people can be physically active, such as parks, green spaces, and bicycle paths and lanes. And although easy access to supermarkets that offer fresh fruits and vegetables is associated with lower body mass index, many neighborhoods in racial and ethnic minority, lower-income and rural areas tend to have more fast-food restaurants and convenience stores and fewer grocery stores than predominantly white, higher-income areas. Consequently, although obesity affects people of all demographics, the prevalence rates are more alarming for racial and ethnic minorities, lower-income families and people in the Southeast region of the United States (seven of the states with the highest poverty rates are also in the top 10 states with the highest obesity rates).

Other important factors that researchers say have contributed to the childhood obesity epidemic are fewer hours of physical activity and an increase of junk foods in schools. Fewer than 4 percent of elementary schools provide the weekly recommended 150 minutes of physical education to all students for the full school year. At the same time, while most schools that sell à la carte and snack foods offer some nutritious food and beverage options, less nutritious alternatives also are common. For example, in one study, 70 percent of the beverage options available in vending machines were high in sugar, only 12 percent of the beverage slots were for water, and only 5 percent were for milk.

== Leadership for Healthy Communities Action Strategies Toolkit ==
The national program office and its grantees have publish a variety of fact sheets, policy briefs, reports, tools and other documents and databases dealing with childhood obesity issues, model policies and health disparities among vulnerable populations. The Leadership for Healthy Communities Action Strategies Toolkit was released during Leadership for Healthy Communities' 2009 Childhood Obesity Prevention Summit in Washington, D.C. The toolkit is a collection of policy options and resources designed to help state and local policy-makers prevent childhood obesity by developing healthier environments. The strategies within the toolkit—which focus on increasing opportunities for physical activity and access to healthy foods in schools and communities—have been identified, evaluated and selected by Leadership for Healthy Communities and 11 participating policy-maker organizations representing state, local and school district decision-makers.
