= Sidney Kimmel Comprehensive Cancer Center =

US cancer research center

Coordinates: 39.289545°N 76.547909°W

The Sidney Kimmel Comprehensive Cancer Center at Johns Hopkins University is an NCI-Designated Comprehensive Cancer Center in Baltimore, MD. It was established in 1973 and received its NCI designation that same year as one of the first designated cancer centers in the country.

SKCCC is a member of the National Comprehensive Cancer Network, an alliance of 27 comprehensive cancer centers in the US.

The current director of SKCCC is William G. Nelson, who has been at JHU since 1992 and specializes in prostate cancer. Past directors have included Albert H. Owens Jr. and Martin Abeloff.

== Research ==
SKCCC conducts cancer research through more than 100 laboratories affiliated with specialized research programs, including Brain Cancer, Breast & Ovarian Cancer, Cancer Biology, Cancer Chemical & Structural Biology, Cancer Immunology, Cancer Molecular & Functional Imaging, Cancer Prevention & Control, Hematologic Malignancies & Bone Marrow Transplant, Prostate Cancer, and SPORE.

The Bloomberg~Kimmel Institute for Cancer Immunotherapy was founded with in 2016 two $50 million gifts from Michael R. Bloomberg and Sidney Kimmel, both of whom have made extensive donations to the university in the past, and an additional $25 million by additional supporters. Drew Pardoll is the founding director.

== Faculty ==
There are many notable faculty at the SKCCC. Among these are winners of the Lasker Award, Nobel Prize, and Wolfe Prize.

- Lasker Award 2006 and Nobel Prize 2009 – Carol Greider, Professor and Director of Molecular Biology and Genetics in the Johns Hopkins Institute for Basic Biomedical Science
- Lasker Award 2016 and Nobel Prize 2019 – Gregg L. Semenza, Professor of Genetic Medicine, Pediatrics, Medicine, Oncology, Radiation Oncology, and Biological Chemistry
- Breakthrough Prize in Life Sciences – Bert Vogelstein, Clayton Professor of Oncology and Pathology and director of the Ludwig Center for Cancer Genetics and Therapeutics
- Daniel Nathans Research Award- Mark J. Levis, Professor of Oncology at the Johns Hopkins University School of Medicine, Director of the Adult Leukemia Service.

== Facilities ==
SKCCC is spread across several facilities. Research is mainly done in two buildings. The Bunting Blaustein Cancer Research Building opened in 1999 and is a ten-story laboratory building housing the programs for research in cancer biology, hematological malignancies, urological oncology, gastrointestinal cancer, solid tumor research, pharmacology, and experimental therapeutics, and cancer prevention and control. The Koch Cancer Research Building (CRB) opened in 2006 and is connected to the Bunting Blaustein Building and houses the prostate, brain, pancreas, skin, lung, and head and neck cancer research programs.

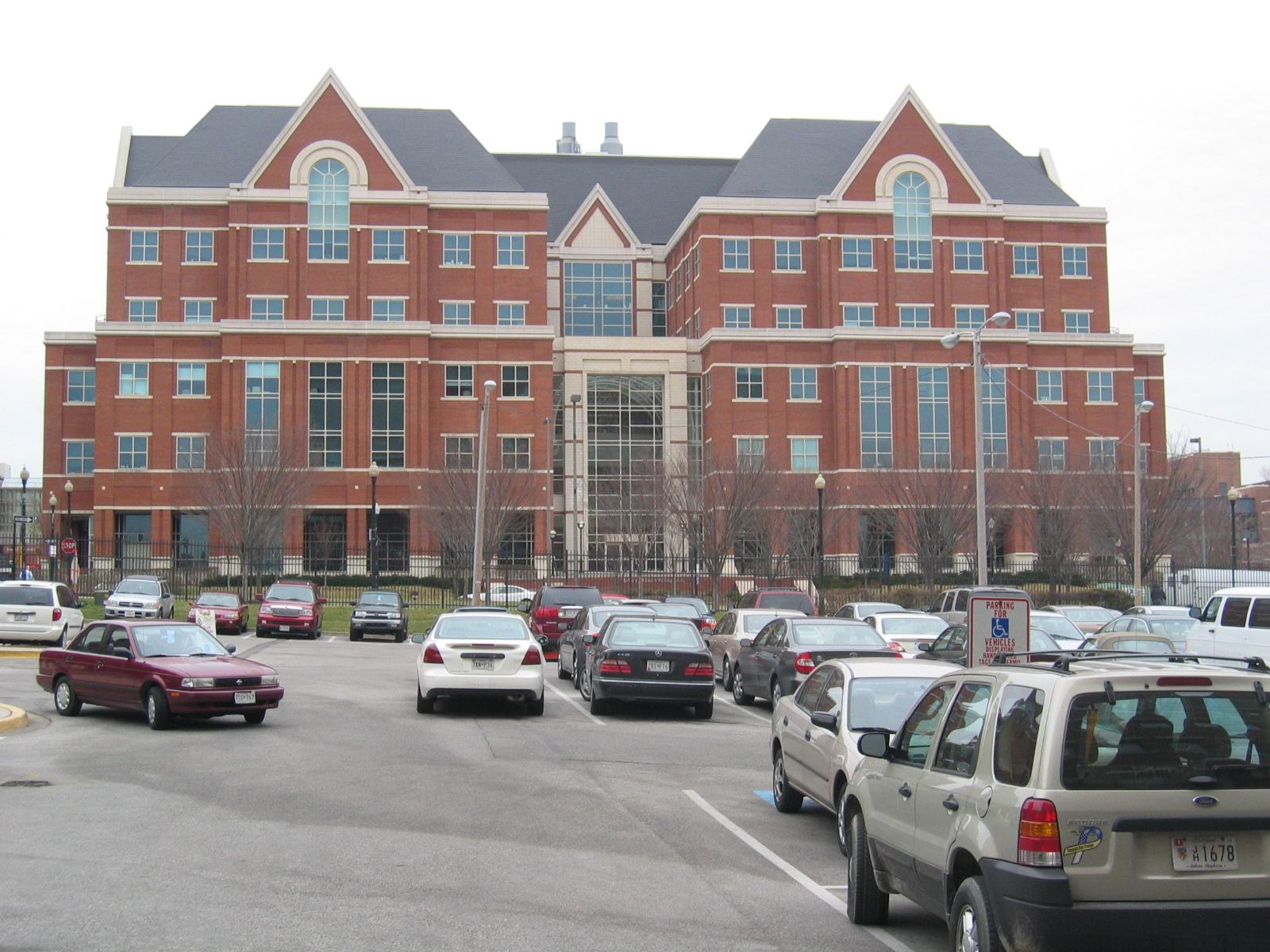
The Harry and Jeanette Weinberg Building

Patient care is given in the Harry and Jeanette Weinberg Building, a 350,000 sq ft, 9-floor building connected to the main hospital by an enclosed walkway. It has 62 medical beds, 72 surgical beds, and 20 ICU beds. The Cancer Counseling Center is located in the Hackerman-Patz Patient and Family Pavilion and offers information about early detection and prevention, palliative care, and programs for survivors.

The Skip Viragh Outpatient Cancer Building is expected to open in Spring 2018. Named after Albert P. “Skip” Viragh Jr, a mutual fund investor who died of pancreatic cancer in 2003, this new building will provide services to over 180 patients with solid tumor daily and enable the Harry and Jeanette Weinberg Building to expand its services to leukemia and myeloma.

It is designated as a Magnet hospital. SKCCC was featured in the 2015 Ken Burns documentary Cancer: The Emperor of All Maladies.
