= John C. Reed =

American biologist

John C. Reed (born October 11, 1958) is executive vice president of pharmaceutical research and development at Johnson & Johnson. He was previously the executive vice president and global head of research and development of Sanofi, the global head of pharmaceutical research and early development at Roche, and the chief executive of the Sanford-Burnham Medical Research Institute in La Jolla, San Diego, California. He was a pioneer in the field of apoptosis particularly with regard to cancer; he was studying oncogenes and discovered that some of them appeared to regulate cell death rather than cell division.

== Research ==
Reed earned his B.A. at the University of Virginia and his M.D. Ph.D. at University of Pennsylvania School of Medicine and then did his postdoctoral fellowship at the Wistar Institute of Anatomy and Biology. He was elected a fellow of the American Association for the Advancement of Science in 2011.
