= 500 Queer Scientists =

US LGBTQ+ campaign

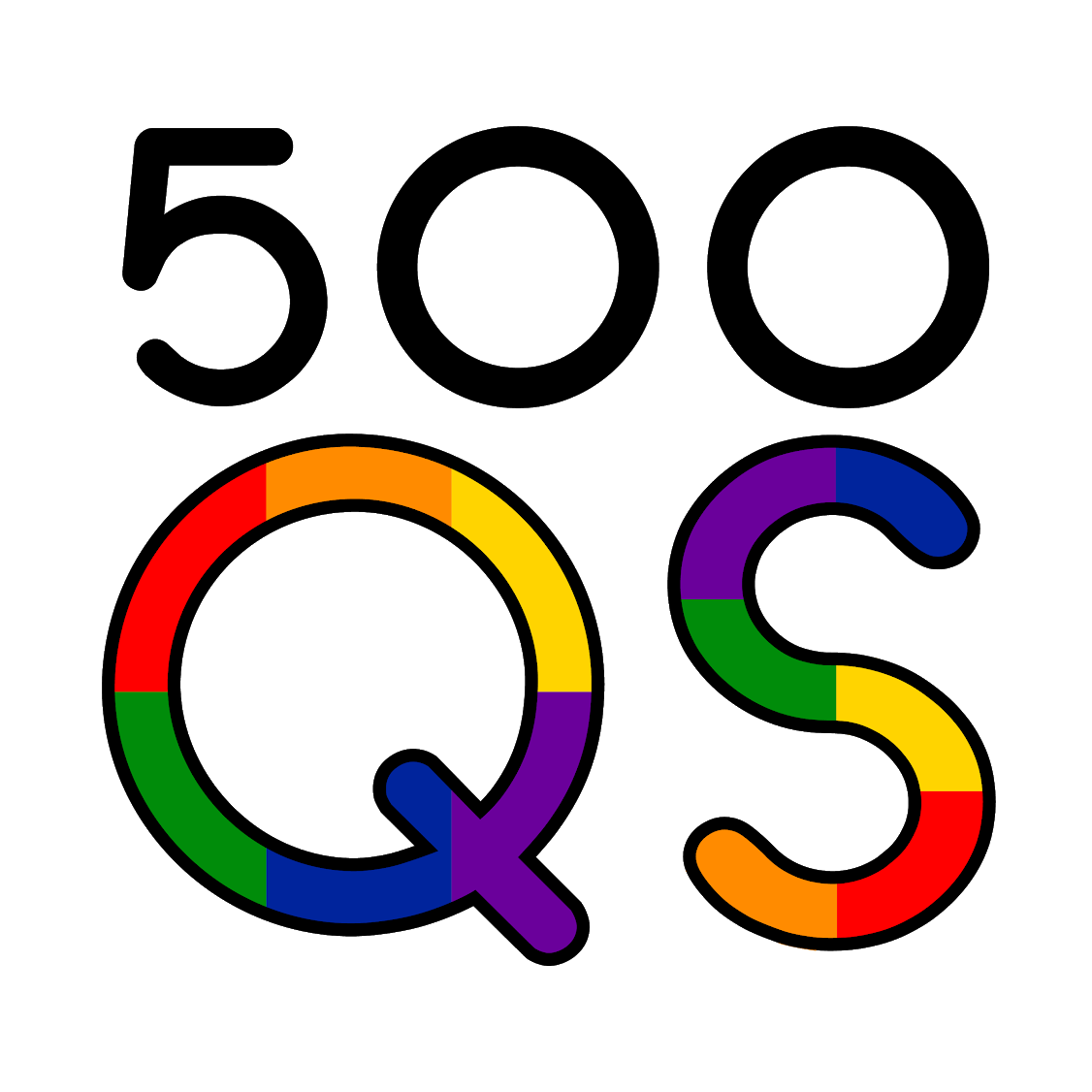
- Founded: 4 June 2018
- Founders: Lauren Esposito, Sean Vidal Edgerton
- Website: 500queerscientists.com

500 Queer Scientists is a visibility campaign for LGBTQ+ people working in the sciences. Queer scientists submit short descriptions of their lives to the organization; these are manually checked and proof-read before being posted to the group's website. In collating submissions, the organization intends to show queer people currently working in science that there are others like them, to provide role models for future generations of researchers, and to create a database that can be used when planning events to ensure representation.

== History ==
The group was founded in San Francisco on 4 June 2018, by Lauren Esposito, an arachnology professor at the California Academy of Sciences and Sean Vidal Edgerton, a science illustrator and evolutionary virologist at the academy. In the press release announcing its foundation, the organization referenced, as part of its motivation, a 2016 paper in the Journal of Homosexuality that found that, in 2013, more than 40% of respondents to a survey who identified as LGBTQ+ had not revealed that they were to their colleagues. The campaign was inspired by the group 500 Women Scientists; the two groups are separate, but consider themselves to be "informally partnered". At launch, the site contained 50 scientists' stories; within a week this had reached 250, and by 26 June there were 550. The first stories were all written in English.

In June 2019, they held an event with publisher Elsevier to mark World Pride. The site had over 900 profiles by July 2019; in that month, the group was involved in organizing the second LGBTSTEM Day.

== Recognition ==
For founding 500 Queer Scientists, the National Organization of Gay and Lesbian Scientists and Technical Professionals awarded the 2019 Walt Westman Award to Lauren Esposito.

== Notable people included ==
- David Adger
- Clara Barker
- Cynthia Bauerle
- Alex Bond
- Ben Britton
- Peter Coles
- Lynn Conway
- Rochelle Diamond
- Jan J. Eldridge
- Lauren Esposito
- Michael Francis Fay
- Jon Freeman
- Sam Giles
- Abhik Ghosh
- Lisa Graumlich
- Renée Hložek
- J. David Jentsch
- Arya Jeipea Karijo
- Autumn Kent
- Nathan H. Lents
- Katie Mack
- Anson W. Mackay
- Jessica Mink
- Shaun O'Boyle
- Jonathon Rendina
- David K. Smith
- Jessica Ware
- Tristram Wyatt
- Jeremy Yoder

== See also ==
- LGBT people in science
- 500 Women Scientists
