= LGBTQ people in science =

Overview of LGBT people in science

Mona Lisa, one of Leonardo da Vinci's most famous works

LGBTQ people in science are students, professionals, hobbyists, and anyone else who is LGBTQ+ and interested in science. The sexuality of many people in science is debated by historians, largely due to the unaccepting cultures in which many of these people lived. For the most part, it is not possible to know for certain how people in the past would have labelled their sexuality or gender because many individuals lived radically different private lives outside of the accepted gender and sexual norms of their time. One such example of a historical person in science that was arguably part of the LGBTQ+ community is Leonardo da Vinci, whose sexuality was later the subject of Sigmund Freud's study.

In modern times, LGBTQ+ individuals in science still navigate a landscape shaped by discrimination, social exclusion, and professional devaluation, but increased visibility and advocacy have led to growing efforts for inclusion and equity. Numerous organizations now work to support LGBTQ+ scientists, while companies and institutions are implementing policies aimed at fostering diversity and reducing barriers for underrepresented groups in STEM. Issues such as the "glass closet," where individuals feel pressure to conceal their identities for career advancement, continue to highlight the ongoing need for systemic change in the scientific community.

== History of LGBTQ+ people in science ==
Magnus Hirschfeld, a German physician and sexologist, was one of the first advocates for homosexual and transgender rights. Hirschfeld was most well known for his sexual theories and for activism. In 1897 Hirschfeld created the first sexual rights organization, the Scientific Humanitarian Community, which aimed to explore and defend the rights of homosexuals. As one of the first advocates for homosexual rights, Hirschfeld faced a great amount of backlash from newspapers claiming, for example, that "abnormal propensities" should be distanced from "mainstream medicine". Hirschfeld was attacked by Nazis for being gay and Jewish, and he was beaten, sacked, and had his books burned. He was eventually forced into exile in France.

John Maynard Keynes, an English economist, changed the ideology and practice of macroeconomics, and his ideas formed the school of thought known as Keynesian economics. Keynes's romantic relationships early in his life were only with other men. He had many sexual encounters with other men and he was open about these affairs. Several communities, in which Keynes was involved with, such as the Bloomsbury Group, and the Cambridge Apostles were accepting towards Keynes's homosexuality. People who opposed Keynes's ideas used his sexuality to attack his work. In Keynes's later years he began to pursue affairs with women. In 1925, Keynes married well-known Russian ballerina, Lydia Lopokova.

Writer, physician, tubercular radiologist, and transsexual Alan L. Hart made great strides in tuberculosis detection after earning his master's degree in radiology from the University of Pennsylvania in 1928. Hart sought psychiatric help from his professor, J. Allen Gilbert, for his "abnormal" attraction to women previous to his transition. The treatment of Hart was documented in the case study "Homosexuality and Its Treatment" in 1920. Hart requested a full hysterectomy, claiming he felt that he deserved to be sterilized for his "abnormal inversions".

Alan Turing was a mathematician, computer scientist, logician, cryptanalyst, philosopher, and theoretical biologist. A key figure in twentieth-century science, Turing led a group of cryptanalysts during World War II that successfully cracked the German Enigma machine, an achievement that significantly contributed to the Allied victory. His work not only helped shorten the war but also laid the foundation for modern computing and artificial intelligence.

Despite his monumental contributions, Turing faced persecution due to his sexuality. In 1952, Turing was charged with "gross indecency" when his homosexuality was revealed—an offense under British law at the time. Rather than face imprisonment, Turing accepted hormone therapy, a form of chemical castration, which severely impacted his health and well-being. Two years later, in 1954, Turing died from cyanide poisoning, widely believed to be suicide. Much of his wartime work remained classified under the Official Secrets Act, and his scientific achievements were largely overshadowed by his prosecution during his lifetime.

At the height of the Lavender Scare, astronomer Frank Kameny was fired by the US Army Map Service in 1957, shortly after his PhD from Harvard University. In 1958, he was barred from future employment in the federal government. Subsequently, radicalized, he became "one of the most significant figures" in the American gay rights movement. According to chemist Abhik Ghosh, the legendary porphyrin chemist Martin Gouterman, only a few years Kameny's junior, managed to escape similar persecution and was able to pursue a successful scientific career at the University of Washington.

Computer scientist Lynn Conway worked at IBM and invented a method for issuing multiple out-of-order instructions per machine cycle. She was also a pioneer of microchip design with many high-tech companies today using her work as the foundations for their technology. Conway suffered from gender dysphoria and underwent a gender transition in 1968. After Conway revealed her intent to transition to IBM, she was fired. After her transition, Conway kept her transition a secret with only a few close friends who knew. In 2000 when her story went public, she began to work in transgender activism to advocate for more transgender rights and transgender equality.

George Washington Carver was an agricultural scientist who developed several plant-based products and promoted the start of peanut farming. Although Carver did not make any comments on his sexuality a previous partner suggested that he was bisexual, and it is known that he lived the remainder of his life with Curtis Austin Jr.

Sara Josephine Baker was a physician known by the name Doctor Jo who developed many programs for disease prevention. She created the Federal Children's Bureau which significantly contributed to the improvement of hygiene. As a leader in public health Baker is known for tracking down and quarantining Mary Mallon aka "Typhoid Mary", helping prevent the further spread of the typhoid fever.

Baker was also an early advocate for women's leadership in medicine and was one of the first women to make significant strides in the field. She focused on the link between poverty and poor health, working to provide universal access to medical care. An openly gay woman, Baker lived with author Ida Alexa Ross Wiley for the later part of their lives. Despite the challenges she faced, her hard work saved countless lives and left a lasting legacy in public health.

Sally Ride was an astrophysicist known for being the first American woman in space. She developed a foundation in her name dedicated to improving science education, particularly for young girls. After she died, it was announced that she and Tam O'Shaughnessy, who she had lived with for 27 years, were partners. This made Ride the first LGBTQ+ astronaut as well.

Ben Barres, a neurobiologist, was one of the first openly transgender scientists and the first to be inducted into the prestigious US National Academy of Sciences. He was a passionate advocate for trans and women's rights, challenging the systemic injustices within both science and academia. Barres made significant contributions to our understanding of the brain, particularly through his research on glial cells. His life and experiences are further explored in his autobiography, The Autobiography of a Transgender Scientist.

Lauren Esposito is a prominent figure in the LGBTQ+ community and a champion for diversity in STEM. As the only woman scorpion expert in the world, Esposito has made numerous contributions to the field of arachnology while advocating for queer visibility in science. Coming from a family deeply rooted in STEM, she followed her passion for biology but faced significant challenges as an openly queer individual navigating academia. Esposito's experience with gendered harassment and microaggressions fueled her commitment to creating a more inclusive space for LGBTQ+ scientists. In 2018, she founded the initiative 500 Queer Scientists, a global visibility campaign to highlight the stories of LGBTQ+ professionals in STEM. With over 1,500 stories shared, Esposito continues to inspire others by fostering a supportive, connected community for queer scientists worldwide.

Ruth Gates was a marine biologist and a passionate advocate for coral reef conservation. As the Director of the Hawaiʻi Institute of Marine Biology, she dedicated her career to studying coral-algal symbiosis and developing strategies to help corals adapt to climate change. A proud member of the LGBTQ+ community, Gates married her wife Robin in 2018, just months before her death. Known for her groundbreaking research on heat-resistant corals, Gates aimed to safeguard coral reefs from the devastating effects of ocean warming and acidification.

Beyond her scientific achievements, Gates was deeply committed to public outreach, using documentaries like Chasing Coral to raise awareness about the urgent need for climate action. Her legacy continues through her lab, the Coral Resilience Lab, and through initiatives like the Ruth Gates Coral Restoration Innovation Grant, ensuring her mission to protect coral ecosystems lives on. Dr. Gates' work not only transformed reef studies but also inspired others to believe in the possibility of changing the narrative around climate change, making her an influential figure for both the scientific and LGBTQ+ communities.

Richard Summerbell is a leading figure in mycology, most notably for his research on fungi and their impact on human and environmental health. Summerbell was a prominent advocate for the LGBTQ+ community, actively participating in the liberation movement in the 70s and 80s. He co-hosted the Canadian show Coming Out, which talked about topics such as AIDS, sexuality, and religion.

== Challenges for LGBTQ+ people in science ==
There are traditions and expectations that LGBTQ+ people should not study or have careers in science, according to Manil Suri. In 2016 the American Physical Society published a list of ways in which LGBTQ+ physicists have a more difficult career experience than their non-LGBTQ+ counterparts. Additionally, the Institute of Physics, the Royal Astronomical Society and the Royal Society of Chemistry published a report called "Exploring the Workplace for LGBT+ Physical scientists" in 2019. This report highlights the current situation, relevant issues for academics in physical sciences as well as areas for increased action.

Studies have shown that many LGBTQ+ faculty and researchers are not out in their departments, and coming out may negatively affect retention. Additionally, the percentage of individuals being out at their workplace varies across different members of the LGBTQ+ community. For example, only 14% of bi- and pansexual individuals reported to be out, while 44% of gay individuals reported to be out according to the British study from 2019. This is of particular issue in the STEM field as the work cultures and professional environments within this field of work can often exclude or alienate the existence of the LGBTQ+ community and the individuals within it.

LGBTQ+ professionals in STEM face a variety of challenges that make their work environments more hostile than those of their non-LGBTQ+ colleagues. A 2021 study identified various systemic inequalities for LGBTQ+ people in science, for example, career limitations and harassment. They are more likely to leave their jobs due to higher levels of social exclusion, professional devaluation, and harassment rates up to 30% higher than their peers. LGBTQ+ individuals also report fewer opportunities for skill development, less access to resources, and less confidence about whistleblowing without retaliation. These issues contribute to higher levels of stress, insomnia, and depression, often linked to workplace marginalization.

A report on a 2015 survey of United States undergraduate students found that gay students of science were more likely to change their major to a subject outside of science than non-LGBTQ+ students. Various studies suggest that social barriers, harassment, and professional devaluation contribute to higher turnover rates among LGBTQ professionals in STEM fields. LGBTQ scientists of color, transgender and nonbinary individuals, and LGBTQ women face compounded disadvantages, with higher levels of exclusion, devaluation, and health challenges.

Chemist David Smith speculated that the visibility of more LGBTQ+ role models in science would make it easier for other LGBTQ+ students to join the sciences, and conducted a survey which seemed to support this view.

Unique challenges for transgender and nonbinary scientists further complicate the picture. They report higher rates of both physical and mental health difficulties, as their gender identity is often more visible than sexual orientation, making them more vulnerable to discrimination. In the UK 20% of trans respondents considered leaving their workplace often compared to 28% of LGBT+ respondents stating they consider leaving sometimes. Further, non-binary respondents reported the lowest perception on how supportive institutional policies are towards LGBT+ people.

Dylan Baker, a transgender software engineer at Google, noted that gender nonconformity or transitioning impacts all interactions in ways that sexual orientation does not, as the latter can be more easily concealed if desired.

Some academic commentators who study LGBTQ+ issues commented that LGBTQ+ students face social barriers to studying science which non-LGBTQ+ people do not experience. Various activist organizations used this study as supporting evidence that social changes could bring equal opportunity for LGBTQ+ people to study and have careers in science.

=== The "glass closet" ===
The "glass closet" represents a pervasive yet often understated barrier that LGBTQ+ individuals face in the workplace. It encapsulates the challenges of being visible while simultaneously encountering implicit biases, microaggressions, or overt discrimination. In science, academia, and industry, these challenges are magnified by systemic structures that have historically excluded LGBTQ+ voices.

Breaking free from this metaphorical closet is crucial not only for personal authenticity but also for fostering innovation, equity, and diversity across all professional fields. Historically, the risks associated with coming out in professional settings were profound.

Efforts to foster inclusivity in the workplace have made significant strides in recent years. Progressive organizations, such as Out & Equal Workplace Advocates, have been instrumental in creating safer spaces for LGBTQ+ employees. Similarly, companies like Genentech have implemented comprehensive policies to support LGBTQ+ professionals, including offering domestic partnership benefits and establishing employee resource groups. These initiatives are steps toward dismantling the systemic barriers that perpetuate the glass closet. However, progress is not uniform. Inconsistent federal protections and varying state-level policies leave many LGBTQ+ individuals vulnerable to discrimination. For instance, the lack of universal domestic partnership benefits creates significant inequities, particularly for those living in conservative regions. Addressing these systemic gaps requires sustained advocacy at both the organizational and governmental levels.

The importance of dismantling the glass closet extends beyond individual empowerment. Research shows that diverse teams outperform homogenous ones, fostering innovation and creativity. Organizations like NOGLSTP and SACNAS have helped this movement, providing mentorship, networking opportunities, and resources for LGBTQ+ professionals and their allies. These efforts are crucial for building supportive communities that amplify marginalized voices.

== Organizations and campaigns ==
=== United States ===
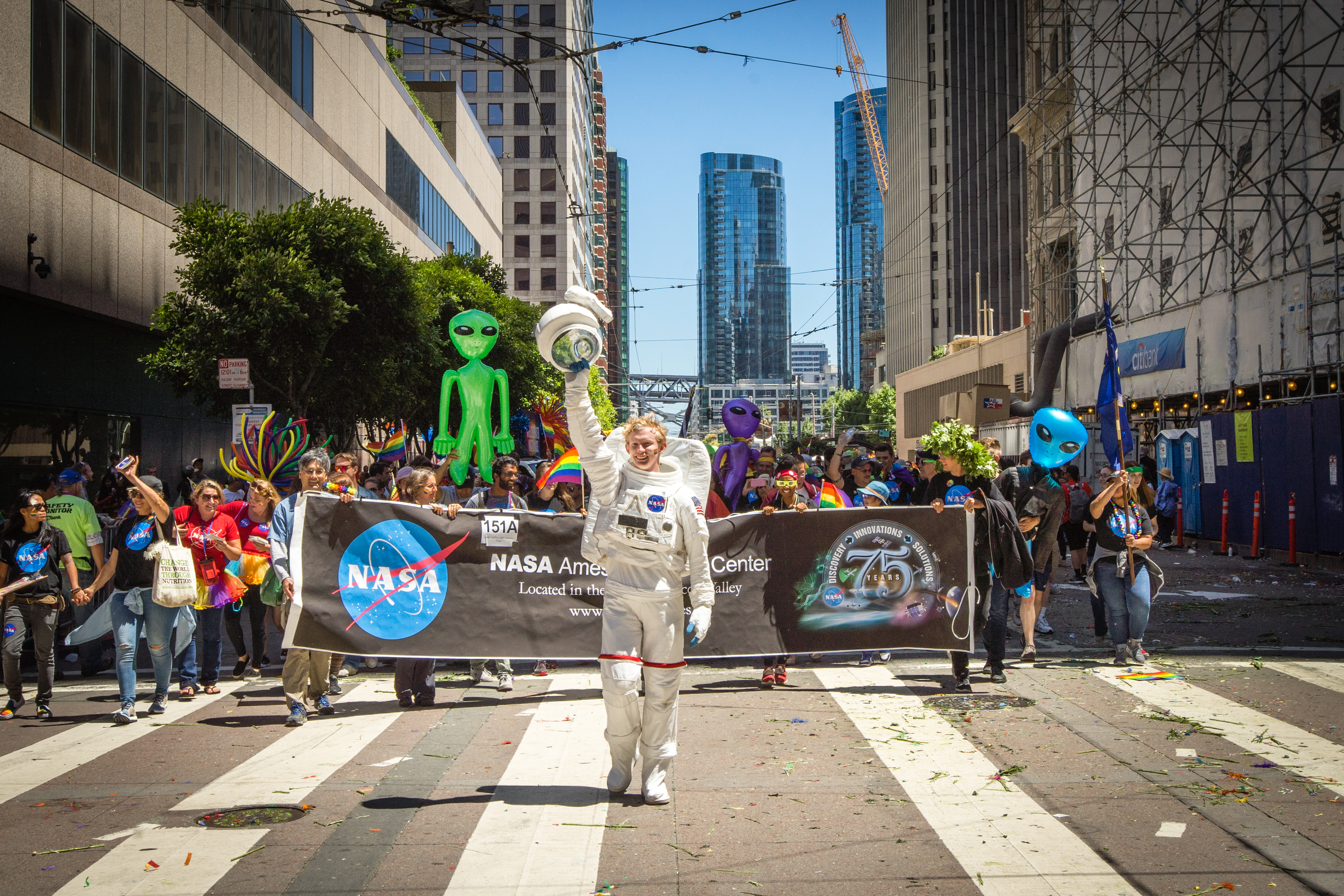
NASA pride parade in Silicon Valley

In recognition that LGBTQ+ people are underrepresented in the sciences, various universities have programs to encourage more LGBTQ+ students to join their science programs. The organization is oSTEM (Out in Science, Technology, Engineering, and Mathematics) has a network of about 120 student chapters at universities and professional chapters across the United States. oSTEM has an annual conference and aims to provide a place for LGBTQ+ science students to gather, whether they are out or not.

Other professional organizations for LGBTQ+ people in science include the Out to Innovate. Out to Innovate educates professional communities about LGBTQ+ issues and offers two scholarships annually. In 2018, Lauren Esposito, curator of arachnology at the California Academy of Sciences, created the campaign 500 Queer Scientists, which aims to promote inclusivity in science. NASA employees annually holds LGBT pride parade events.

Additional LGBTQ-focused organizations in tech and STEM include Lesbians Who Tech, a global network that promotes visibility, leadership, and opportunities for LGBTQ+ women and non-binary individuals in tech. Maven Youth focuses on empowering LGBTQ+ youth through tech education, mentorship, and leadership development, helping them prepare for careers in STEM. Out for Undergrad (O4U) connects high-achieving LGBTQ+ undergraduates with professional opportunities and mentorship in industries like technology and engineering.

QueerTech offers a platform for LGBTQ+ professionals in tech to network and increase representation in the field. TransTech Social Enterprises supports trans and gender non-conforming individuals through tech training and job opportunities. StartOut is dedicated to fostering entrepreneurship within the LGBTQ+ community by providing resources, mentorship, and networking for LGBTQ+ entrepreneurs, especially in the tech sector.

=== United Kingdom and Europe ===
Pride in STEM, a charitable organization based in the United Kingdom, co-founded the International Day of LGBTQ+ People in Science, Technology, Engineering and Maths. In Germany, a similar movement was founded under the name LGBTQ STEM Berlin.

The Proud Science Alliance is a collective organisation made up of representatives from LGBTQ+ networks from across the healthcare and life sciences sector.

The first interdisciplinary conference in the UK for LGBTQ+ people working in STEM fields was the LGBTSTEMinar hosted at the University of Sheffield in 2016. It has been hosted annually since then and in 2020 the Royal Society Athena Prize was awarded for this work.

The European Geoscience Union (EGU), which is an academic non-profit organization, also features an EGUpride working group. Since 2019, the EGUpride group has organizes social and networking events and workshops during the general assembly.

== Corporate policies & inclusion efforts ==
Corporate policies aimed at promoting LGBTQ+ inclusion have become important for diversity, equity, and innovation in the modern workplace. Achieving true inclusion requires more than surface-level commitments; it involves embedding equity into policies, practices, and cultural norms. Generally, the areas for increased action can be split into three levels: individual, employer and learned society.

=== The value of inclusive corporate policies ===
Inclusive policies serve as both a moral imperative and a strategic advantage. Research consistently demonstrates that diverse workplaces outperform less inclusive ones by fostering creativity, improving problem-solving, and enhancing employee satisfaction. The 2021 Corporate Equality Index by the Human Rights Campaign illustrates that workplaces supportive of LGBTQ+ employees experience higher productivity, retention, and employee engagement. Despite this, LGBTQ+ employees in many parts of the U.S. remain vulnerable due to inconsistent federal protections, necessitating proactive efforts by individual companies.

=== Examples of inclusive practices for institutions ===
Several key practices exemplify the commitment to inclusion, from equitable benefits to creating safe spaces for gender expression. Therefore, institutions should act proactive in developing and advancing best practices on LGBT+ issues.

Gender-neutral bathrooms, for instance, offer essential dignity and inclusivity for nonbinary and transgender employees. By removing binary constraints, these facilities help mitigate daily stressors for gender-diverse employees.

Similarly, respecting preferred pronouns is another cornerstone of an inclusive workplace. The recognition of self-identified names and pronouns fosters a culture of respect and reduces microaggressions. Additionally, encouraging everyone to include their pronouns in email signatures erases a spotlight on individuals. Inclusive dress codes further empower employees by eliminating outdated gender norms and allowing for authentic self-expression.

Equitable leave policies are particularly vital for LGBTQ+ families, who have historically been excluded from benefits such as parental leave and family health insurance.

=== Inclusive practices within academic publishing ===
One obstacle in academic publishing for transgender scientists can be changing their legal name, which can result in losing their publication record. This loss can be prevented by using, for instance, ORCID, which is a unique number to identify authors and contributors of scholarly communication. Nevertheless, this still means that the former name, also called deadname, is accessible. To alleviate this problem, different academic publishing houses have announced "name change policies". For instance, Copernicus Publications, IOP Publishing and ACS Publishing from the American Chemical Society.

=== Industry examples in LGBTQ+ inclusion ===
Apple is a leader in promoting diversity, with initiatives such as Pride@Apple, a resource group for LGBTQ+ employees. Apple's workforce reflects significant representation from underrepresented communities, and its openly gay CEO, Tim Cook, serves as a visible advocate for equity.

AT&T, a pioneer in LGBTQ+ inclusion, was among the first companies to implement anti-discrimination policies based on sexual orientation. Its LGBTQ+ employee network, League at AT&T, has been a model for workplace resource groups since its founding in 1987. The company also actively supports LGBTQ+ visibility through sponsorships like the LOVELOUD music festival.

Google demonstrates its commitment through extensive philanthropic efforts, such as donating millions to LGBTQ+ organizations and initiatives like OutRight Action International. The company's platform amplifies LGBTQ+ visibility through features such as LGBTQ-friendly business attributes and Pride-themed doodles.

Since 1996, IBM has offered domestic partner benefits and collaborated with organizations such as Out & Equal to advance workplace equity. The company has also advocated for legislative measures, including personal appeals to Congress for the Equality Act.

Salesforce similarly prioritizes LGBTQ+ inclusion through equality groups such as Outforce and targeted diversity recruiting initiatives. In 2021, the company launched gender-inclusive benefits, including support for transgender employees and their families, during Transgender Awareness Week.

PayPal has taken bold stances against discriminatory policies, such as withdrawing plans for a headquarters in North Carolina after the state passed anti-LGBTQ+ legislation. Its partnerships with organizations like Out in Tech demonstrate a broader commitment to advocacy and digital equity.

Pinterest stands out for publishing its own gender transition guide and earning top scores in the Human Rights Campaign's Corporate Equality Index. The company provides resources and benefits aligned with the World Professional Association for Transgender Health, reinforcing its dedication to inclusivity.

=== Broader impact ===
Corporate efforts to support LGBTQ+ employees extend beyond internal policies. By leveraging their platforms, these companies influence societal norms and advance broader conversations about equality. For example, public support for the Equality Act and partnerships with advocacy organizations amplify the fight for federal anti-discrimination protections. Furthermore, initiatives like diversity resource groups provide critical networking and mentorship opportunities, enabling LGBTQ+ professionals to advance their careers. While significant progress has been made, challenges remain. Companies must continually evaluate and adapt their policies to address emerging needs and ensure all employees feel empowered. The ongoing advocacy of industry leaders sets a promising precedent for workplaces of the future, where diversity and inclusion are integral to corporate success. By adopting and expanding these practices, businesses can drive meaningful change for their employees, industries, and society at large.

== See also ==
- 500 Queer Scientists
- LGBTQ people
- LGBTQ (term)
- Pride (LGBTQ culture)
- LGBTQ history
