= Sally Aitken =

Sally Aitken may refer to:

- Sally Aitken (academic), Canadian academic and specialist in forestry genetics
- Sally Aitken (director), Australian film director
