= Bauerle =

Bauerle is a surname. Notable people with the surname include:

- Amelia Bauerle (1873–1916), British painter, illustrator, and etcher
- Cynthia Bauerle, American molecular biologist and college administrator
- Jack Bauerle (born c. 1952), American swimming coach
