= Sean Whelan =

Sean Whelan may refer to:

- Sean Whelan (journalist), Irish journalist
- Sean Whelan (scientist), British-American virologist
