= Shaun O'Boyle =

- Citizenship: Ireland
- Education: NUI Galway
- Scientific career
- Thesis: (2008)
- Academic advisors: Lucy Byrnes and Maura Grealy
- Website: www.shaunoboyle.org

Shaun O'Boyle is a science communicator, podcast producer and activist, best known for his work to promote science and to improve representation of LGBTQ+ scientists. He was the chair and one of the organisers of the Irish March for Science and also founded House of STEM which aims to connect LGBTQ+ scientists in Ireland.

== Early life and education ==
O'Boyle grew up in County Donegal, Ireland, and completed a BSc in Physiology at NUI Galway. He also carried out his PhD in Developmental Biology from 2003-2008 there, where he investigated the first genes to be 'switched on' in developing zebrafish embryo.

== Career ==
O'Boyle completed a postdoctoral research position between 2009-2010 at University College Dublin, working with Kay Nolan on the evolution of genomic imprinting. He subsequently worked at Science Gallery Dublin from 2011-2016 in a variety of roles and also produced Futureproof for Newstalk radio station from 2010-2013.

O'Boyle set up the audio producing partnership Bureau with artist Maurice Kelliher in 2013. Bureau have made radio documentaries and podcasts, on a diverse range of subjects, for: BBC Radio 4, Documentaries on Newstalk, Science Gallery Dublin/International, Irish Design 2015, LGBT History Month UK, Inspirefest, Festival of Curiosity, UCD/Science Foundation Ireland, and BBC World Service. Their documentaries and podcasts feature a diverse range of voices and issues and have been widely commended.

He established House of STEM in 2017 to connect and to address issues facing LGBTQ+ scientists in Ireland. In 2018 he helped set up LGBT STEM Day - in which a group of national and international organisations collaborated to create an initiative to raise awareness for LGBT+ people working in Science, Technology, Engineering and Maths. LGBT STEM Day falls on 5 July annually. He also co-curated The Queer Variable, a collection of interviews with LGBT+ people in STEM, with Alfredo Carpineti, chair of Pride in STEM.

O'Boyle joined Dublin City University in 2021, where he works as a Research Fellow and part time Diversity and Inclusion Engagement Lead at the ADAPT Centre. His work there includes the Irish Sign Language STEM Glossary, which seeks to address gaps in Irish Sign Language for technical terms in STEM, and co-creating art and science frameworks for engaging deaf people with sign language technologies.

== External sources ==
- Shaun O'Boyle speaking at Inspirefest 2018.
