= Sara Brownell =

American biology education researcher

Sara Elaine Brownell
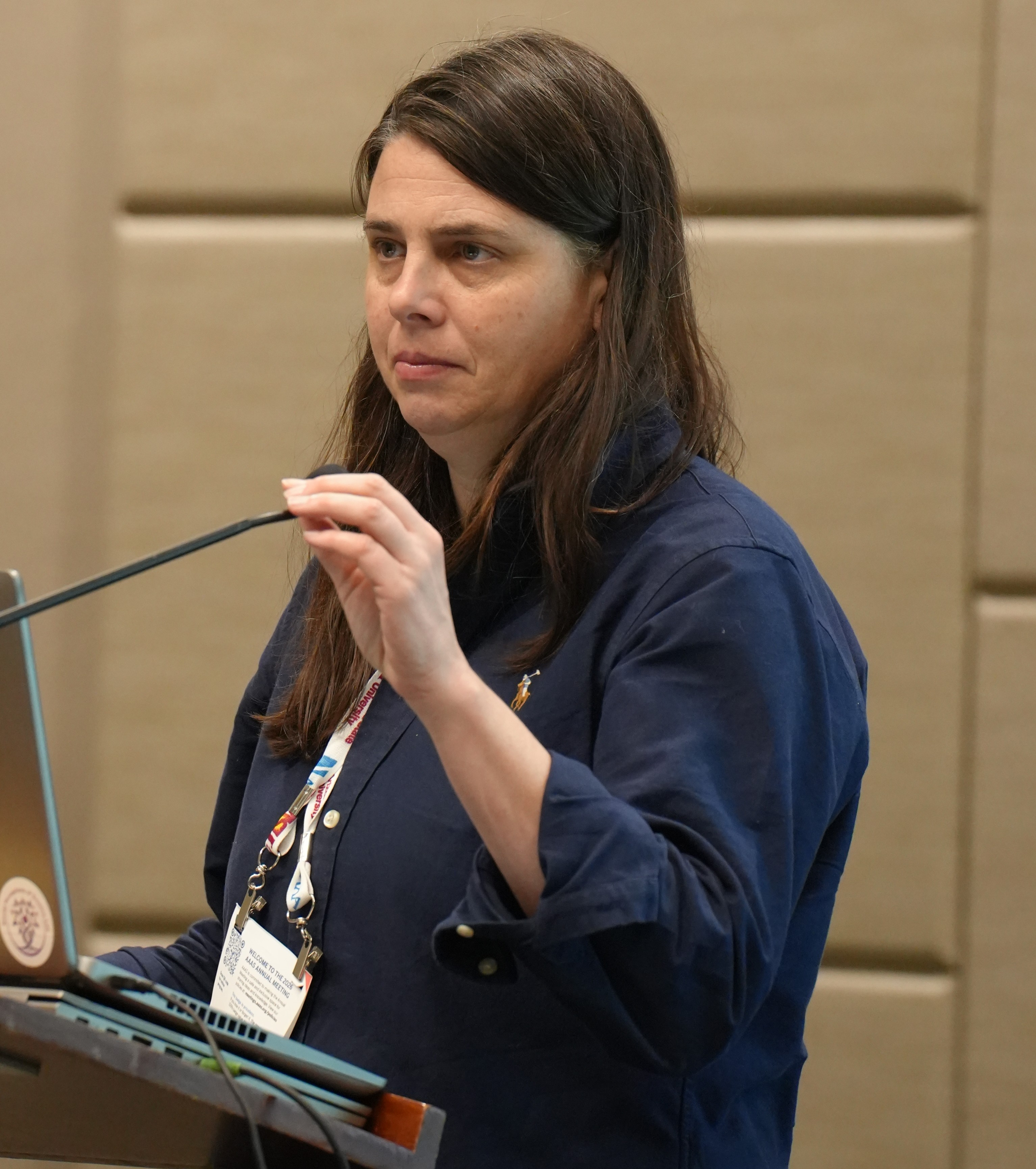
- Education: Cornell University; The Scripps Research Institute; Stanford University
- Scientific career
- Workplaces: Arizona State University; San Francisco State University; University of Washington
- Thesis: Small heat shock proteins as novel anti-inflammatory therapeutics for neurological diseases : multiple sclerosis and stroke (2011)

Sara Elaine Brownell is an American biology education researcher who is a President's Professor at Arizona State University. Her research looks to make undergraduate science teaching more inclusive. She was elected a Fellow of the American Association for the Advancement of Science in 2022.

== Early life and education ==
Brownell was an undergraduate student in biology at Cornell University. She moved to The Scripps Research Institute, where she worked toward a master's degree. She joined Stanford University as a doctoral researcher, studying small heat shock proteins (sHSPs) as anti-inflammatory therapeutics. She found that certain sHSPs were protective in mouse models of multiple sclerosis and stroke. In particular, deficiency of Alpha B crystallin (CRYAB) is associated with worse disease outcome in stroke patients. She simultaneously earned a master's degree in education at Stanford University. After completing her doctorate, Brownell joined the faculty at Stanford as a lecturer in biology and developed inquiry-based lab courses. She worked at both the San Francisco State University and University of Washington as a postdoctoral researcher in science education.

== Research and career ==
Brownell studies biology education: how biology students learn and how biology educators can develop more effective and inclusive ways to teach. She was appointed an assistant professor at Arizona State University in 2014. She was promoted to associate professor in 2018, full Professor in 2021, and President's Professor in 2023. In 2020, she founded the university's Research for Inclusive STEM Education Center where her research focuses on concealable stigmatized identities in science.

Brownell has investigated the origins of the gender gaps in science, with a specific focus on achievement and participation in biology. Her research has shown that male students are more self-confident than their female counterparts in their science classes. These differences in self-perception can impact motivation and participation. She identified that undergraduates who experience a positive lab environment are considerably more likely to complete a degree in STEM. She has investigated how students from marginalized groups experience active learning, and why educators from underrepresented groups may disclose their identities to students. In particular, Brownell showed that active learning forces students to interact with one another, which can make LGBTQ+ students feel like they have to "come out".

Brownell identified that there is a cultural disconnect between secular college educators and often more religious college students. Together with PhD student Elizabeth Barnes, Brownell developed strategies to help educators reduce any conflicts between the teaching of evolution and holding of religious beliefs. Barnes and Brownell showed that it was possible to acknowledge that theological questions being with "why", whilst science attempts to answer "how".

== Awards and honors ==
- 2020 Arizona State University Committee for Campus Inclusion Catalyst Award
- 2020 National Organization of Gay and Lesbian Scientists and Technical Professionals LGBTQ+ Educator of the Year
- 2021 National Association of Biology Teachers Evolution Education Award
- 2022 John A. Moore Lectureship
- 2022 Elected Fellow of the American Association for the Advancement of Science

== Selected publications ==
- Sara E Brownell; Kimberly D Tanner (1 January 2012). "Barriers to faculty pedagogical change: lack of training, time, incentives, and...tensions with professional identity?". CBE: Life Sciences Education. 11 (4): 339–346. doi:10.1187/cbe.12-09-0163. ISSN 1931-7913. PMC 3516788. PMID 23222828. Wikidata Q36452077.
- Gita Bangera; Sara E. Brownell (1 January 2014). "Course-based undergraduate research experiences can make scientific research more inclusive". CBE: Life Sciences Education. 13 (4): 602–606. doi:10.1187/cbe.14-06-0099. ISSN 1931-7913. PMC 4255347. PMID 25452483. Wikidata Q34629457.
- Sara E. Brownell; Jordan V. Price; Lawrence Steinman (15 October 2013). "Science Communication to the General Public: Why We Need to Teach Undergraduate and Graduate Students this Skill as Part of Their Formal Scientific Training". Journal of undergraduate neuroscience education : JUNE : a publication of FUN, Faculty for Undergraduate Neuroscience. 12 (1): E6–E10. ISSN 1544-2896. PMC 3852879. PMID 24319399. Wikidata Q37367739.
- Carly Busch, Katelyn Cooper, Sara Brownell (20 July 2023) "Women drive efforts to highlight concealable stigmatized identities in U.S. academic science and engineering" PLOS One
