= Lisa Graumlich =

American paleo-ecologist (born 1952)

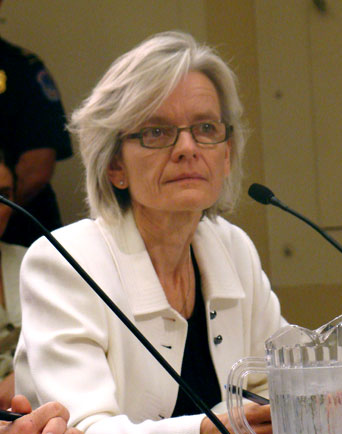
- Lisa Graumlich at the United States Senate Select Committee on Energy Independence and Global Warming in 2010
- Education: University of Wisconsin–Madison; University of Washington
- Scientific career
- Workplaces: University of Washington; The University of Arizona; Montana State University

Lisa J. Graumlich (/ˈɡrɒmlɪk/ GROM-lik; born 1952) is an American paleoclimatologist who studies the interactions between the climate, ecosystems and humans. She is the inaugural dean of College of the Environment at the University of Washington. Graumlich is a Fellow of the American Association for the Advancement of Science and the Ecological Society of America, and served as president of the American Geophysical Union.

== Education and early career ==
Graumlich is from Toledo, Ohio. She studied Botany at the University of Wisconsin–Madison, earning a bachelor's degree in 1975 and a master's degree in Geography. She earned a PhD in 1985 from Forest Resources at the University of Washington. Graumlich worked with Margaret Davis as a postdoctoral fellow at the University of Minnesota in 1986. She joined the American Geophysical Union in 1992.

== Research ==
Graumlich pioneered the use of dendrochronology to understand the impacts of climate change on mountain ecosystems. Her academic career began at University of California, Los Angeles as an assistant professor in the Department of Geography. While at UCLA, she initiated a series of studies in the Sierra Nevada to study Foxtail Pine trees that she continued when she joined the Laboratory of Tree-Ring Research at The University of Arizona.

Graumlich's work has ranged from an examination of the impact of carbon dioxide on subalpine tree growth to a 1,000 year-old reconstruction of temperature and precipitation for the Sierra Nevada. Graumlich discovered that between 1000 and 1375 A.D there were consistently high temperatures, one of the important expressions of the so-called Medieval Climate Anomaly in California . In collaboration with Professor Andrea Lloyd at Middlebury College, Graumlich documented 1000 years of changes in treeline in the Sierra Nevada, noting that the response of high-elevation tree lines to global warming will depend on the water supply. Together with Professor Andy Bunn from Western Washington University, she was able to refine the critical role of topography in mediating temperature-growth relationships in high elevation forests. The paleoclimate record puts the 20th century into context. For example, she found that between 1937 and 1986 the Western United States experienced significantly wet weather. The time corresponds with the greatest years of Immigration to the 'golden' states.

Graumlich and Professor Paul Sheppard, The University of Arizona, were the first North American scientists to collaborate with Chinese tree-ring scientists to establish long-term records of climate variability in Western China. Analysis of cores from ancient juniper trees and archeological wood revealed relatively dry years during 74–25 BC, AD 51–375, 426–500, 526–575, 626–700, 1100–1225, 1251–1325, 1451–1525, 1651–1750 and 1801–1825. Periods with a relatively wet climate occurred during AD 376–425, 576–625, 951–1050, 1351–1375, 1551–1600 and the present. A key feature of precipitation record is an apparently direct relationship between interannual variability in rainfall with temperature, whereby increased warming in the future might lead to increased flooding and droughts.

Reflecting her commitment to interdisciplinary research and learning, Graumlich was named the inaugural director of the Institute for the Study of Planet Earth at The University of Arizona. Graumlich moved to Montana State University in 1998, where she served as director of the Mountain Research Center and executive director of the Big Sky Institute. While at MSU, she continued her tree-ring research while expanding her work to more explicitly incorporate human interactions. In 2006 she published Sustainability or Collapse? An Integrated History and Future of People on Earth with MIT Press. The book covered the Maya civilization, the Roman Empire and El Niño.

In 2007 Graumlich returned to The University of Arizona to lead the School of Natural Resources and the Environment . Her research concentrated on climate change and natural resource management, in particular severe and persistent droughts. She continued to focus on the impacts of severe and persistent droughts in the Western US, including studies large scale tree mortality.

Graumlich was appointed as the inaugural Dean of the University of Washington College of the Environment in 2010. She is the Mary Laird Wood Professor at the University of Washington. Here she has appointed Sally Jewell as a distinguished fellow with the College of the Environment and chair of the advisory council for EarthLab.

In 2010 she testified before the United States House of Representative Select Committee on Energy Independence and Global Warming. She presented evidence from tree ring data that demonstrated that in the late 20th century the world was the warmest it had been for the past 1000 years. She served on the Lord Oxburgh inquiry panel that studied the Climatic Research Unit email controversy with the University of East Anglia. She has written for the Huffington Post. In 2017 she was elected to the American Geophysical Union board of directors.

Graumlich has a career-long commitment to increasing diversity, equity and inclusion in STEM. At the University of Washington she works with the President's Race and Equity Initiative to improve academic culture and to combat the racism and inequities, both individual and institutional, that persist in academia and throughout our society. Graumlich is outspoken on the need to embrace and support LGBTQIA scientists and students, and is a member of 500 Queer Scientists.

== Awards ==
- 2004 Fellow of American Association for the Advancement of Science
- 2013 Fellow of the Ecological Society of America

== Personal life ==
Graumlich lives in Seattle with her wife, who is a mathematician, and her two daughters. In Seattle she serves on the board of directors of the Woodland Park Zoo and the Seattle Aquarium.
