= Jeremy Yoder =

American evolutionary ecologist and biologist

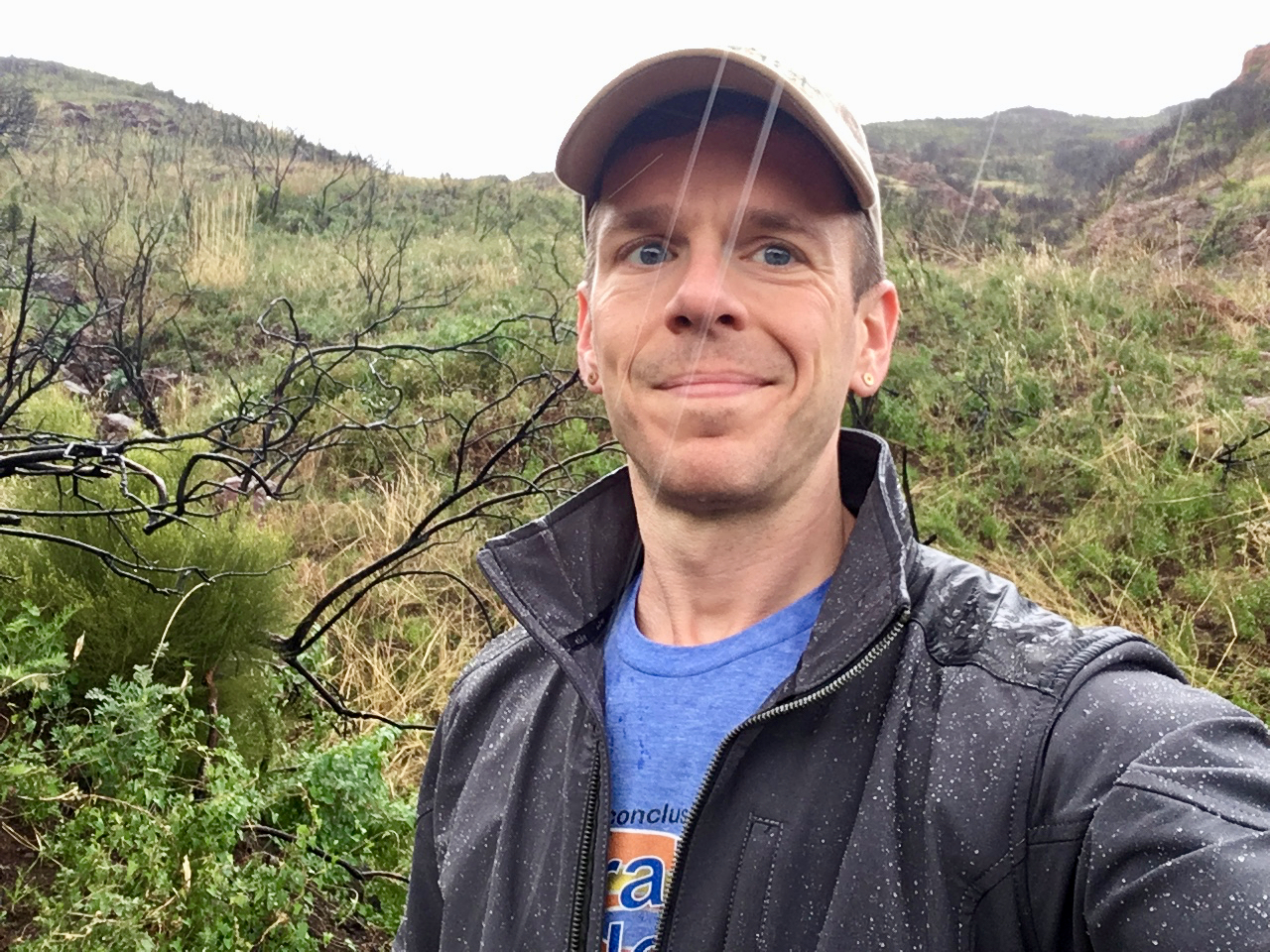
- Yoder in 2020
- Education: Eastern Mennonite University (B.S.); University of Idaho (Ph.D.)
- Scientific career
- Fields: Coevolution, population genomics
- Workplaces: California State University, Northridge
- Thesis: Species interactions and the origins of biological diversity (2011)
- Doctoral advisor: Olle Pellmyr
- Website: jbyoder.org

Jeremy B. Yoder is an American evolutionary biologist, science communicator and LGBTQIA+ advocate. He is an associate professor of biology at California State University, Northridge.

== Education ==
Yoder completed a B.S. at Eastern Mennonite University in 2004.

He earned a Ph.D. from University of Idaho in 2011. His doctoral advisor was Olle Pellmyr. Yoder's dissertation was titled Species interactions and the origins of biological diversity.

He completed a postdoc at University of Minnesota with Peter Tiffin, and conducted further postdoctoral studies at University of British Columbia under Sally Aitken.

== Career and research ==
Yoder is an evolutionary biologist, science communicator and LGBTQIA+ advocate. He joined California State University, Northridge as an assistant professor of biology in 2017. Yoder studies "coevolution and the population genomics of local adaptation, particularly in mutualisms." He researches how the ecological impacts of different climates, biological communities, and habitats relate to biodiversity by conducting field studies and using mathematical modelling and population genomic data. Through the analysis of a global database, Yoder and his colleagues have studied pollination interactions of zygomorphic flowers. He discovers that plants with zygomorphic flowers have fewer visitor species possibly because of their manipulations of pollinator behaviors. His finding suggests that plant taxa with zygomorphic flowers are more susceptible to extinction due to pollinator loss. In 2013, Yoder collaborated with Allison Mattheis on research investigating the experiences of LGBTQIA+ identifying individuals in STEM. He is a collaborator with the Joshua Tree Genome Project and the Queer in STEM study of LGBTQ experiences in scientific careers. He has written for the website of Scientific American, the LA Review of Books, the Chronicle of Higher Education, The Awl, and Slate.

== Personal life ==
Yoder is gay. He is an advocate for LGBTQIA+ individuals in STEM.
