= David Adger =

Scottish linguist and professor

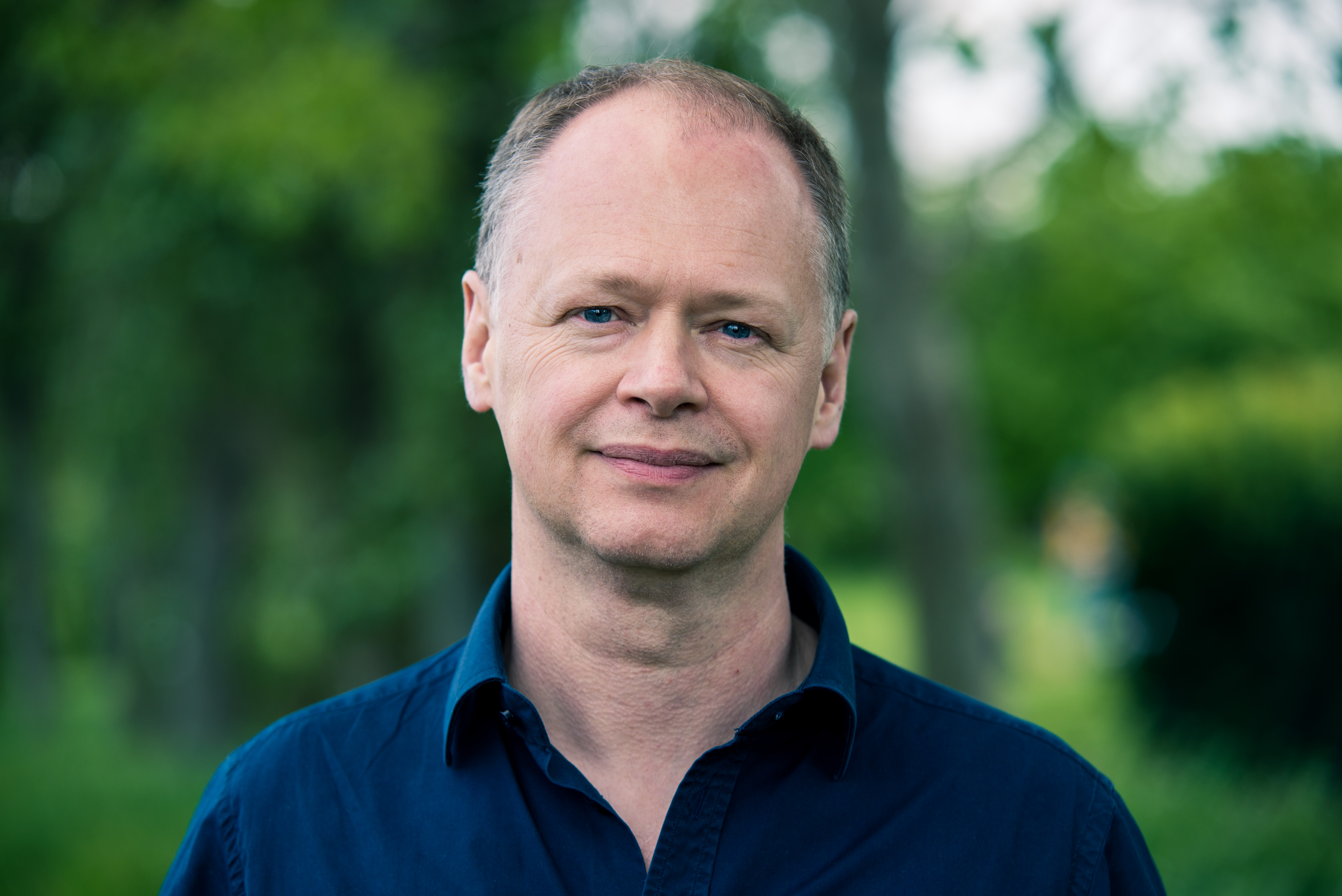
- Born: 23 September 1967 (age 59)
- Spouse: Anson W. Mackay

Academic background
- Education: University of Edinburgh
- Thesis: Functional heads and interpretation (1994)
- Doctoral advisor: Elisabet Engdahl

Academic work
- Discipline: Linguist
- Sub-discipline: Syntax
- Institutions: Queen Mary University of London

David Adger FBA (born 23 September 1967) is a professor of Linguistics at Queen Mary University of London. Adger is interested in the human capacity for syntax. Adger served as president of the Linguistics Association of Great Britain from 2015 to 2020.

== Early life and education ==
Adger was born on 23 September 1967 in Kirkcaldy, Fife, Scotland. At the age of eleven Adger became fascinated by language, reading Ursula K. Le Guin's A Wizard of Earthsea. At the age of sixteen, Adger won a school competition coordinated by the University of St Andrews and spent the money on copies of Noam Chomsky's Aspects of the Theory of Syntax. He studied linguistics and artificial intelligence at the University of Edinburgh. Adger has described the undergraduate teaching he received as one of the "exhilarating experiences of my life". He remained in Edinburgh for his graduate studies, working toward a master's in cognitive science. He completed a doctorate under the supervision of Elisabet Engdahl in 1994. During his doctorate he visited the University of Massachusetts Amherst as a research student. His doctoral research examined the syntax-semantics interface and how syntactic agreement relates to semantic specificity.

== Research and career ==
Adger became a lecturer at the University of York in 1993. In 2002 Adger moved to the Queen Mary University of London, where he had been appointed Reader in Linguistics. He was appointed Professor of Linguistics in 2006.

His research considers the science of language, and whether human brains create language because of our ability to recognise patterns or because of a specifically linguistic ability. He has investigated the nature of grammatical structure and the relationship between sociolinguistic theories and syntactic structure.

From 2006 to 2009 Adger held a Leverhulme Major Research Fellowship investigating “The Grammar-Meaning Connection”.

In 2015, Adger was elected as the seventeenth president of the Linguistics Association of Great Britain. He visited the University of Maryland, College Park in 2016, where he delivered a series of lectures discussing minimalist syntax, semantics and merge.

From 2020 to 2022 Adger held a Leverhulme Major Research Fellowship for his project "Simplifying and Restricting Syntax".

In July 2020, Adger was a notable signee on a petition for the removal of Steven Pinker from the Linguistic Society of America’s honorary status as Fellow of the society.

Adger has created fictional languages for several television productions, including Beowulf: Return to the Shieldlands and Nautilus.

== Selected publications ==
=== Papers ===
- Adger, David; Harbour, Daniel (2007). "Syntax and Syncretisms of the Person Case Constraint". Syntax. 10: 2–37. doi:10.1111/j.1467-9612.2007.00095.x.
- Adger, David; Ramchand, Gillian (16 March 2006). "Predication and Equation" (PDF). Linguistic Inquiry. 34 (3): 325–359. doi:10.1162/002438903322247515. S2CID 17029000.
- Adger, David; Ramchand, Gillian (13 March 2006). "Merge and Move: Wh-Dependencies Revisited". Linguistic Inquiry. 36 (2): 161–193. doi:10.1162/0024389053710729. S2CID 30519402.

=== Books ===
- Adger, David (2003). Core Syntax: A Minimalist Approach. Oxford: Oxford University Press. ISBN 978-0199243709.
- Adger, David; Harbour, Daniel; Watkins, Laurel (2009). Mirrors and Microparameters: Phrase Structure beyond Free Word Order. Cambridge University Press. ASIN B004YXU63U.
- Adger, David (2012). A Syntax of Substance. MIT Press. ASIN B00MHAUYNE.
- Adger, David (2019). Language Unlimited: The Science Behind Our Most Creative Power. Oxford University Press. ASIN B07SC3ZXMY.

From 2007 to 2013 Adger served as editor of Syntax.

== Personal life ==
Adger is married to Anson W. Mackay, a geographer at University College London. He is a member of 500 Queer Scientists, an organisation that champions LGBT scientists and engineers. Adger was listed as one Queen Mary University of London LGBT+ role models in 2018.
