= Anson W. Mackay =

British geography professor

Anson Mackay
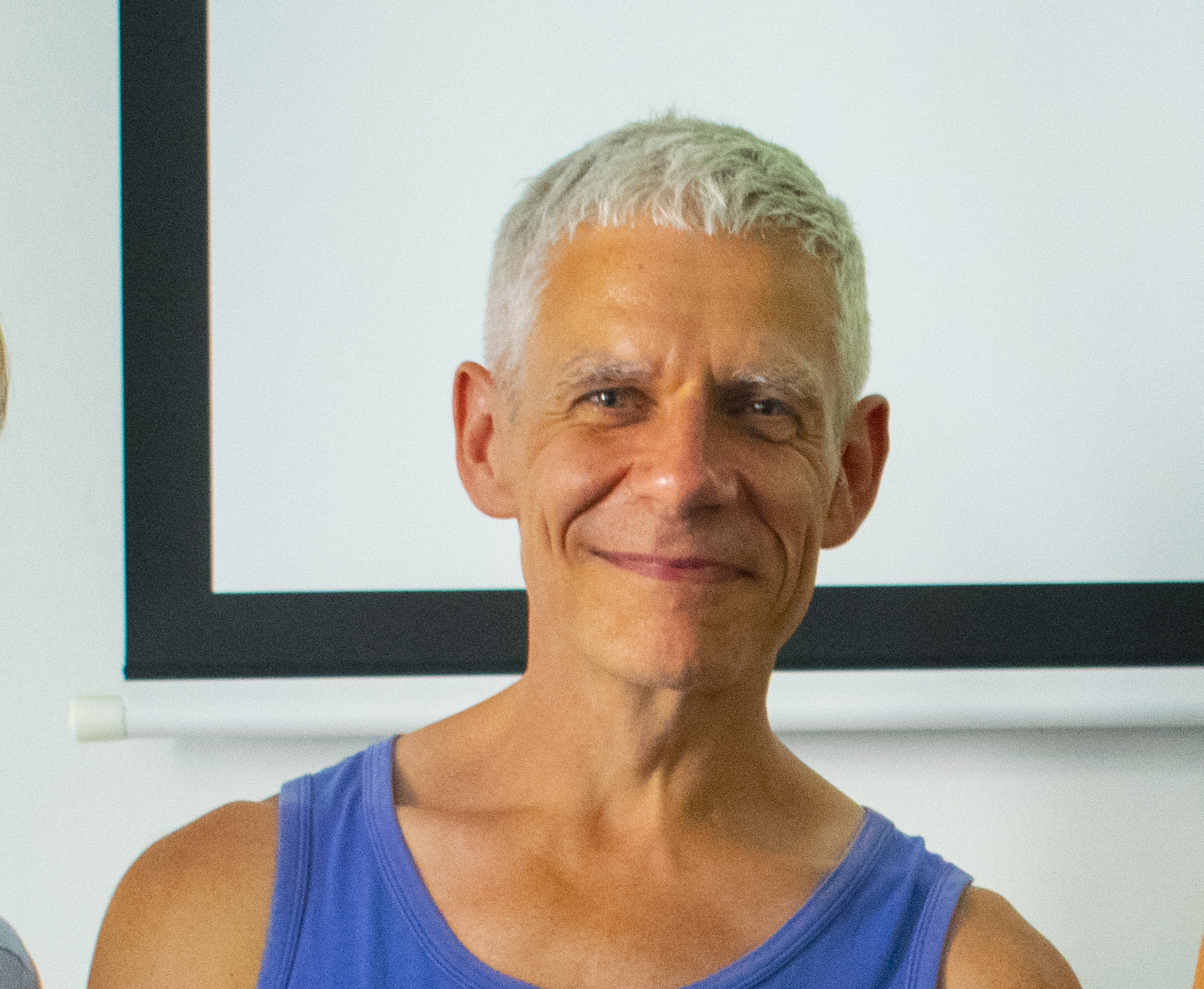
- Born: 1967 (age 58–59); Tongue, Scotland
- Education: University of Edinburgh (BSc); University of Manchester (PhD)
- Known for: Freshwater ecology
- Spouse: David Adger
- Scientific career
- Workplaces: University College London

Anson W. Mackay is an emeritus Professor of Geography in the Environmental Change Research Centre at University College London, having retired in April 2022 because of ill health. They work on the impact of climate change on freshwater ecosystems. Mackay was editor-in-chief of the Royal Geographical Society journal Geo: Geography and Environment (2015–2020) and is on the board of the South African Geographical Journal.

== Life and education ==
Mackay was born to crofters in the village of Tongue on the north coast of Scotland. They studied Biological Science at the University of Edinburgh and graduated in 1989. They moved to Manchester for their doctorate, and earned a PhD in palaeoecology in 1993. They were appointed a Leverhulme fellow at University College London.

While at Edinburgh, Mackay came out as gay and began a relationship with David Adger, who they are still with. Since 2022 Mackay has identified as non-binary. They are a keen and regular runner of marathons and ultramarathons, despite having stage-4 HPV-related cancer.

== Research and career ==
Mackay was appointed a lecturer at University College London in 2000 and promoted to professor in 2013. They have extensively investigated the impact of pollution on Lake Baikal, as well as the Aral Sea and Okavango Delta.

They have reconstructed the climate history of Lake Baikal for the past 800,000 years. Lake Baikal is the world's deepest and oldest lake, and is home to one fifth of the world's fresh water. Over 75% of the species exist nowhere else in the world. Mackay has studied the numbers of the microalgae diatoms in Lake Baikal, and showed that they have declined as the lake gets warmer. Some diatoms are more sensitive than others, which lets Mackay and colleagues look at the impact of pollution in the past. They study the populations of diatoms by studying silicon isotopes, which form the base of the diatom food chain. Mackay believes that the water quality has deteriorated due to inadequate sewage treatment. Additionally, the nearby Baikal Paper and Pulp Mill generates sulphates, organic chlorine and hundreds of thousands of tonnes of bleached pulp, which make their way into the lake. Mackay has shown that these changes have also impacted phytoplankton and zooplankton.

== Prizes ==
UCL Inclusion Awards: Sir Stephen Ward 'Inspiring Role Model' and EDI Team Award for 'Inspirational Engagement' (2022)

Royal Geographical Society's Victoria Medal (2023) for 'their transformative impact on the discipline of geography'.

== Academic service ==
Mackay was editor-in-chief of the Royal Geographical Society journal Geo: Geography and Environment (2015-20) and sat on the board of Open Quaternary. They have written for The Conversation. They have been nominated for Student Choice awards, including Inspiring Teaching, Equality & Diversity and Exceptional Feedback. In 2017 Mackay established the LGBTQ+ network Out Geography. They are part of the network 500 Queer Scientists, and has been part of a successful parliamentary inquiry into the impact of scientific funding on equality and diversity.

== Books ==
Mackay, Anson (2014). Global Change in the Holocene. Routledge. pp. 2019–07–04. ISBN 978-0340812143.
