= Jan J. Eldridge =

New Zealand theoretical astronomer

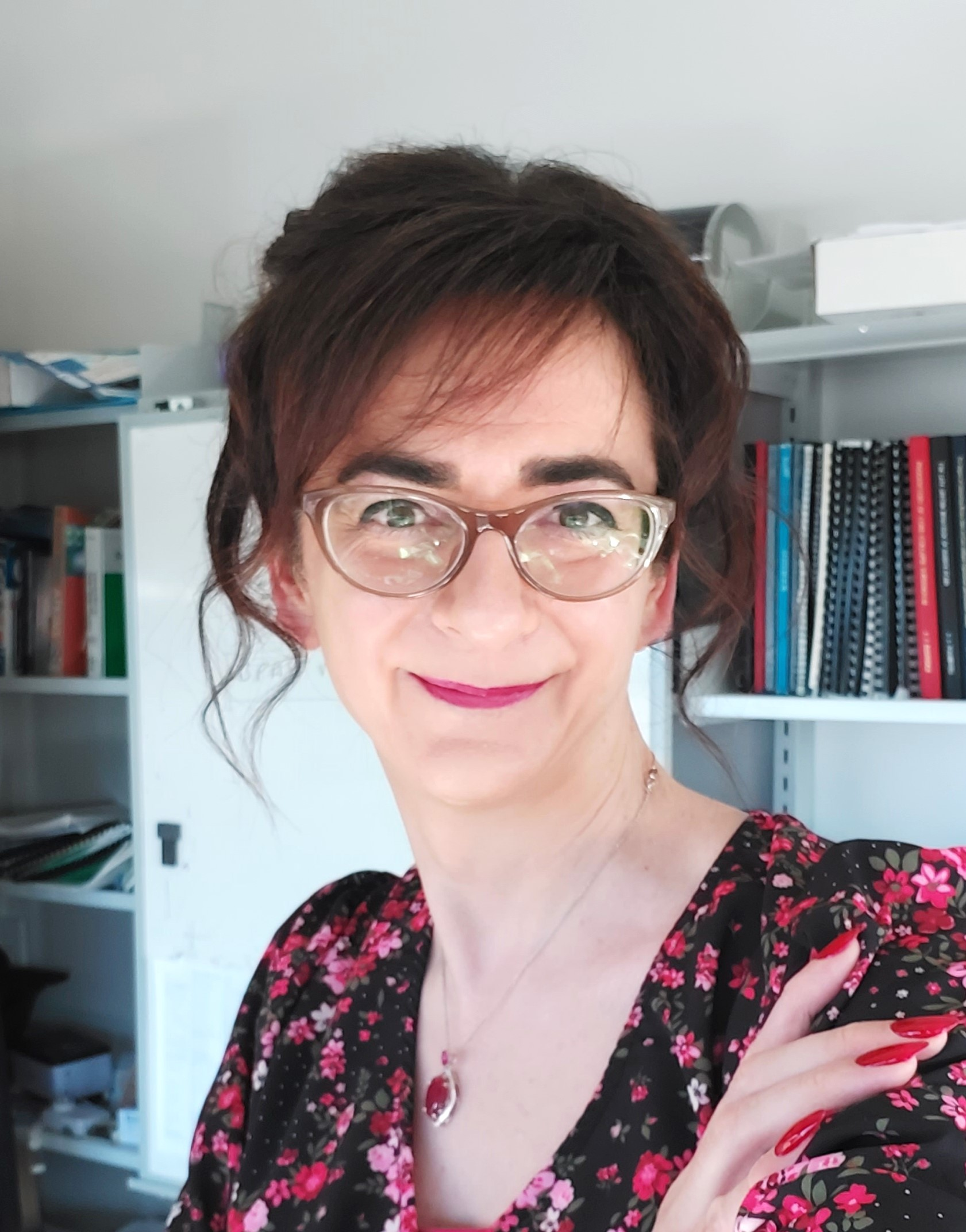
- Eldridge in 2023
- Citizenship: New Zealand
- Education: University of Cambridge
- Known for: Research on evolution of binary star systems, co-developing Binary Population and Spectral Synthesis models (BPASS)
- Awards: Anne Green Prize for Mid-Career Scientist, awarded by the Astronomical Society of Australia (2020); Faculty of Science Award for Sustained Excellence in Teaching, awarded by the University of Auckland (2019)
- Scientific career
- Fields: Theoretical astrophysics
- Workplaces: Institut d'Astrophysique de Paris, Queen's University Belfast, Institute of Astronomy, Cambridge, University of Auckland
- Thesis: Progenitors of Core-Collapse Supernovae (2002)
- Website: https://jjeldridge.blogs.auckland.ac.nz/

Jan J. Eldridge is a New Zealand theoretical astrophysicist based in the Department of Physics at the University of Auckland in New Zealand, and co-author of The Structure And Evolution Of Stars.

== Education and research ==
Eldridge obtained their MA and MSci from the University of Cambridge, England. They also obtained their PhD in astrophysics at Cambridge, in the Institute of Astronomy, with a thesis titled 'Progenitors of Core-Collapse Supernovae'. They worked as a postdoctoral researcher at the Institut d'astrophysique de Paris and Queen's University in Belfast, before returning to the Institute of Astrophysics at Cambridge. In 2011 they were appointed lecturer in astrophysics at the University of Auckland in New Zealand.

Eldridge studies the evolution of binary stars using numerical models. At the University of Auckland, together with Elizabeth Stanway, they co-developed the Binary Population and Spectral Synthesis (BPASS) models to study the evolution of stars. They used these models to show that globular clusters were younger than previously thought.

Together with Christopher Adam Tout, they wrote The Structure And Evolution Of Stars, published in 2019 by World Scientific Europe.

Eldridge has been acknowledged numerous times for their teaching skills. They were the Physics Department Teacher of the Year in both 2012 and 2016, and received a Faculty of Science Award for Sustained Excellence in Teaching from the University of Auckland in 2019. They are also a Fellow of the Royal Astronomical Society and Fellow of the Astronomical Society of Australia and were awarded the Anne Green Prize in 2020.

== LGBTQIA+ advocacy ==
Eldridge is a non-binary trans woman, and uses they/them and she/her pronouns. They are a strong advocate of LGBTQIA+ inclusion. They sit on the Equity committee in the Faculty of Science at the University of Auckland. They also lead the Trans on Campus and Rainbow Science groups at the university. Their efforts have been recognized as key in winning the Pleiades Bronze Award by the Department of Physics at the University of Auckland. They also work with the Australian Society of Astronomy (ASA) on the Inclusive, Diverse, Equitable Astronomy (IDEA) group. For their work in LGBTQIA+ inclusion they were shortlisted for the New Zealand LGBTI Hero of the Year Award.

== See also ==
- LGBT people in science
