= Daniele Cherniak =

Geochemist

Daniele Jean Cherniak
- Born: October 24, 1961
- Education: University at Albany, State University of New York
- Scientific career
- Workplaces: Rensselaer Polytechnic Institute
- Thesis: A particle accelerator based study of major and trace element diffusion in minerals (1990)

Daniele Cherniak is an American geochemist known for her work on using particle beams for geochemical analysis on small scales. She was elected a fellow of the American Geophysical Union in 2021.

== Education and career ==
Cherniak grew up in Cohoes, New York and went to Keveny Memorial Academy. In 1983, Cherniak received her undergraduate degree from Union College and went on to earn her Ph.D. in physics at the University at Albany, SUNY in 1990. As of 2021, she is a research professor at Rensselaer Polytechnic Institute and works at the Ion Beam Lab at the University at Albany.

== Research ==
Cherniak is known for her research on rock-forming minerals, specifically on atomic diffusion in these minerals. She established the use of ion implantation to place lead into minerals followed by the use of Rutherford backscattering spectrometry to obtain diffusion profiles, which she first applied to measurements in apatite and zircon, and has subsequently applied to other minerals. She has also examined the diffusion of rare-earth elements, tetravalent cations, and oxygen into zircon. Her work on argon showed that the degassing of Earth is slower than expected. Much of her work is collaborative projects with E. Bruce Watson. In 2020, she began a project working with scientists Union College on a study of radioactive decay which will improve both disposal of nuclear waste and increase precision of dating material that is billions of years old.

== Selected publications ==
- Cherniak, Daniele J.; Watson, E. Bruce (December 1, 1994). "A study of strontium diffusion in plagioclase using Rutherford backscattering spectroscopy". Geochimica et Cosmochimica Acta. 58 (23): 5179–5190. Bibcode:1994GeCoA..58.5179C. doi:10.1016/0016-7037(94)90303-4. ISSN 0016-7037.
- Cherniak, D. J.; Hanchar, J. M.; Watson, E. B. (May 1, 1997). "Diffusion of tetravalent cations in zircon". Contributions to Mineralogy and Petrology. 127 (4): 383–390. Bibcode:1997CoMP..127..383C. doi:10.1007/s004100050287. ISSN 1432-0967. S2CID 96293255.
- Hanchar, John M.; Finch, Robert J.; Hoskin, Paul W. O.; Watson, E. Bruce; Cherniak, Daniele J.; Mariano, Anthony N. (May 1, 2001). "Rare earth elements in synthetic zircon: Part 1. Synthesis, and rare earth element and phosphorus doping". American Mineralogist. 86 (5–6): 667–680. Bibcode:2001AmMin..86..667H. doi:10.2138/am-2001-5-607. ISSN 1945-3027. S2CID 94098626.
- Cherniak, D.J; Watson, E.B (2001). "Pb diffusion in zircon". Chemical Geology. 172 (1–2): 5–24. Bibcode:2001ChGeo.172....5C. doi:10.1016/S0009-2541(00)00233-3.
- Cherniak, Daniele J.; Watson, E. Bruce (January 2, 2003). "Diffusion in Zircon". Reviews in Mineralogy and Geochemistry. 53 (1): 113–143. Bibcode:2003RvMG...53..113C. doi:10.2113/0530113. ISSN 1529-6466.

== Awards and honors ==
- Fellow, Geochemical Society (2010)
- Fellow, American Geophysical Union (2021)
- Walt Westman Award, National Organization of Gay and Lesbian Scientists and Technical Professionals (2021)

== Personal life ==
Cherniak started running cross country while in high school and continued to run while at Union College. Cherniak runs in ultramarathons and has earned team bronze medals in 1998 and 2000 in the IAU 100 km World Championships. Her local running club, Hudson Mohawk Road Runners Club, elected her to their hall of fame for her running accomplishments, the first woman to receive this honor.

Cherniak also volunteers for the Spindle City Historic Society in Cohoes, New York and has been recognized for her work in historic preservation in the area, especially in the restoration of parts of the Erie Canal.
