= Jonathon Rendina =

American social and health psychologist

- Education: Pennsylvania State University (BPhil); CUNY Graduate Center (MA, PhD); Hunter College and CUNY Graduate School of Public Health and Health Policy (MPH)
- Scientific career
- Fields: Social and health psychology
- Workplaces: Hunter College
- Thesis: Hot and bothered: the role of arousal and rejection sensitivity in dual process sexual decision making for gay and bisexual men (2014)
- Doctoral advisor: Sarit Golub
- Other academic advisors: Anthony D'Augelli

H. Jonathon Rendina is an American social and health psychologist. He is an Assistant Professor of Psychology at Hunter College and the Director of the Applied Intersectionality & Minority Stress Lab (AIMS Lab) in the PRIDE Health Research Consortium. His research focuses on intersectionalities sexual minority stress, LGBT health disparities, and the stigma of living with HIV.

== Education ==
Rendina completed a B.Phil in interdisciplinary studies with a focus on sexuality and health and minors in psychology and human development and family studies at the Schreyer Honors College at Pennsylvania State University in 2008. His thesis was titled Predictors of high risk sexual behavior among young gay and bisexual males. Rendina's thesis supervisor was Anthony D'Augelli. He earned a M.A. in psychology at the CUNY Graduate Center in 2012. His master's thesis was titled Concealing and revealing: The nature and function of possible selves for HIV status disclosure. In 2013, Rendina completed an M.P.H. in epidemiology and biostatistics at Hunter College and CUNY Graduate School of Public Health and Health Policy. His thesis was titled Stigma and sexual compulsivity in a community-based sample of HIV-Positive Gay and Bisexual men. He completed a Ph.D. in basic and applied social psychology in 2014 at the CUNY Graduate Center. His dissertation was titled Hot and bothered: the role of arousal and rejection sensitivity in dual process sexual decision making for gay and bisexual men. His doctoral advisor was Sarit Golub.

== Career ==
Rendina joined Hunter College in 2016 as a full-time faculty member. He is an assistant professor of psychology at Hunter College and the director of the AIMS Lab, which is part of the PRIDE Health Research Consortium. In 2017, he became the principal investigator of a $3.6 million NIH grant to study stigma and HIV-related health outcomes. Co-investigators include Sarah Feldstein Ewing. Rendina's lab studies the intersectionalities of sexual minority stress, LGBT health disparities, and the stigma of living with HIV.

== Personal life ==
Rendina is gay.
