= Virginia Uribe =

American educator and LGBTQ advocate (1933–2019)

- Born: December 20, 1933; Los Angeles, California, U.S.
- Died: March 30, 2019 (aged 85); Los Angeles, California, U.S.
- Occupations: Educator, advocate for LGBTQ+ youth

Virginia Uribe (December 20, 1933 – March 30, 2019) was an American educator, counselor and LGBTQ youth education outreach advocate. She was best known for founding the Los Angeles Unified School District's Project 10 program, an educational support and drop-out prevention program for LGBT youth, and the nonprofit arm of the Project 10 program, Friends of Project 10 Inc.

== Early life and education ==
Uribe was born in Los Angeles, and lived her entire life in Pasadena, California. She grew up in an Italian family, living with parents and her grandparents in the same household. Her grandparents were immigrants and "intensely" patriotic. Uribe felt that her family was supportive of her throughout her childhood, which gave her the mindset and strength needed to advocate for youth.

Uribe attended Catholic schools throughout elementary school, high school, and college. She graduated from Immaculate Heart College in 1955, earned a master's degree there in 1962, and completed doctoral studies in psychology at Sierra University in 1988.

== Career ==
During her career as a science teacher and counselor at Fairfax High School, Uribe became interested in youth LGBT outreach. She decided to form the program after hearing student concerns about a gay African-American male who had been kicked out of his family's home and dropped out of four high schools due to being sexually harassed. She founded Project 10 in 1984, as a drop-out prevention program for students who were LGBT. The program gained notoriety in the media following attacks on the program by Rev. Lou Sheldon and the Traditional Values Coalition, and people from around the country began sending money to Project 10. With that, she formed the nonprofit arm in 1986, Friends of Project 10 Inc.

=== Project 10 and Friends of Project 10 Inc. ===
Uribe founded Project 10 in 1984 to help schools curtail harassment of homosexual students, therefore reducing the LGBT dropout rate. Project 10, Los Angeles Unified School District program, provides support services and education for gay, lesbian, transgender, bisexual, and questioning students. Project 10's main goal was to establish voluntary, confidential, peer support groups led by trained facilitators. The support groups provided a safe environment for discussing the coming out process, family relationships, harassment, and health.

The organization also worked to educate young people, educators, and parents on important issues such as HIV/AIDS, STDs, teenage pregnancy prevention, school dropout, depression, and substance abuse. Services were provided to elementary and secondary advisers and district staff for at-risk youth. According to the organization's mission statement, "[Project 10] works to assure that public schools are in compliance with state and federal laws regarding sexual orientation and gender identity, and that academic achievement should not be limited by being part of a marginalized social group."

Project 10 received backlash from conservative politician Marian La Follette in March 1988, who led the GOP caucus in voting to withhold new funds from the Los Angeles Unified School District until it stopped supporting the program. Despite this, then District Supt. Leonard Britton and school board members voiced strong support for Uribe, the program, and homosexual students. On September 24, 1990, a session to teach some San Diego Unified School District staffers how to help students with the "curiosity, depression and fear that can surround homosexuality" drew a crowd outside of about 25 people, many of whom protested the program.

Friends of Project 10 Inc., became a resource for educators, students, parents, and community groups throughout the country. The organization contributed to the ultimate passage of AB 537, the California Student Safety and Violence Prevention Act 2000, which prohibits discrimination and harassment on the basis of sexual orientation or gender identity in California public schools. Friends of Project 10 Inc., produced Youth Lobby Days, the Make It Real Conference, the LGBTQ Youth Prom, the Models of Excellence Scholarship competition, and the annual Models of Pride Conference.

=== Awards and honors ===
Uribe received recognition for her work from the California State Assembly and State Senate, the Mayor's office of the City of Los Angeles, National Education Association, the LA Gay & Lesbian Center, GLADD, the Stonewall Scholarship Committee of United Teachers Los Angeles, 1999 Liberty Award from Lambda Legal Defense, Southern California Women for Understanding, the LA Gay and Lesbian Chamber of Commerce, the City of West Hollywood, Long Beach Pride, the LA County Human Relations Commission, the Los Angeles Unified School District, Vox Femina LA. Uribe was awarded the NOGLSTP GLBT Educator of the Year Award in 2009. One of her proudest moments was when she was informed by the White House, during President Obama's tenure, that she was a finalist for the Presidential Citizens Medal.

== Personal life and legacy ==
Uribe felt her deepest attractions towards women. During her time as a student, she found herself sexually attracted to nuns at the Catholic schools she attended. She eventually married a man, but the marriage ended in divorce. She was the mother to two children and a grandmother to two children. Later in life, she met Gail Rolf in 1988, and they were later married in October 2008, and remained together until her death.

Uribe died in March 2019, at the age of 85. In June 2019, Uribe was one of the inaugural fifty American “pioneers, trailblazers, and heroes” inducted on the National LGBTQ Wall of Honor within the Stonewall National Monument (SNM) in New York City’s Stonewall Inn. The SNM is the first U.S. national monument dedicated to LGBTQ rights and history, and the wall's unveiling was timed to take place during the 50th anniversary of the Stonewall riots.
