= Donna Riley =

Researcher

Dr. Donna Riley
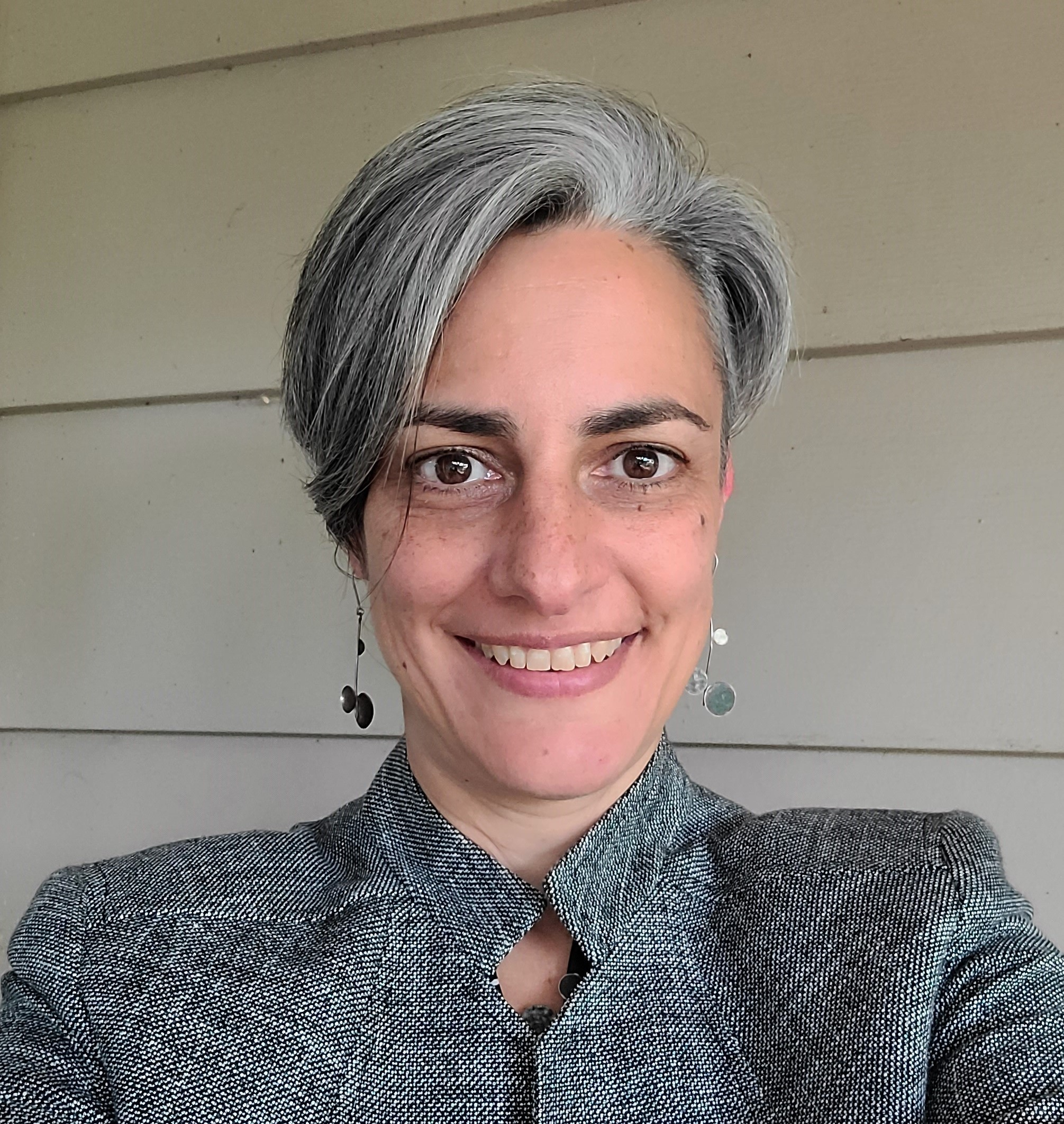
- Education: Carnegie Mellon University; Princeton University; Westridge School for Girls
- Occupations: Jim and Ellen King Dean of Engineering and Computing and Professor
- Engineering career
- Discipline: Chemical Engineering; Engineering and Public Policy
- Employer(s): University of New Mexico; Purdue University; ASPIRE Research Center; Virginia Tech; National Science Foundation; Smith College; USEPA; Princeton University
- Awards: Alfred N. Goldsmith Award; Fellow of the American Society of Engineering Education; Sterling Olmsted Award; GLBTA Educator of the Year Award

Donna Riley is currently the Jim and Ellen King Dean of Engineering and Computing at University of New Mexico. Riley is known for her work in challenging traditional notions of engineering education. Riley has worked to incorporate a intersectional approach to engineering and uses STS (science and technology studies) as a framework for understanding how engineering affects society in a social and political way.

== Education ==
Donna Riley attended middle and high school at the Westridge School for Girls from 1982 to 1989. She started her higher education career by receiving a B.S. in chemical engineering from Princeton University. She then went on to receive a M.S. and Ph.D. in engineering and public policy from Carnegie Mellon University.

== Early life ==
Riley grew up in Los Angeles and became interested in environmental and social justice issues after attending different events and workshops on different topics. When deciding on what to study in college her father, a chemical engineer, suggested engineering. Going from an all girls high school to Princeton, Riley was shocked to realize that many of her peers felt that women didn’t belong in engineering. This, along with other experiences of sexist microaggressions led Riley the get involved in the Woman’s center at Princeton.

At Princeton Riley also noticed a difference in the way her engineering classes were taught compared to classes in other disciplines. This would end up being a catalyst for her future teaching styles.

== Career ==
=== Princeton University ===
Riley started her professional career as a clayton postdoctoral fellow in industrial ecology at Princeton University. For 2 years she worked with electronic markets for second-hand goods, and on the industrial ecology of mercury, as well as its cultural and religious uses.

=== Environmental Protection Agency ===
Riley then worked for a year as an AAAS (American Association for the Advancement of Science) Science and Technology Policy Fellow for the US Environmental Protection Agency where she continued her work with mercury.

=== Smith College ===
Riley then moved on to be an associate professor at Smith College. In her 13 years at Smith she taught many core engineering classes and conducted research in engineering education with a focus on the intersections of engineering with ethics, gender studies, and science and technology studies. Riley was also a founding faculty member of the Picker Engineering Program.

=== National Science Foundation ===
After Smith Riley became the program director at the National Science Foundation for 2 and a half years. Here she managed funding for engineering education programs that focused on “informing the creation of a more agile engineering education ecosystem that offers diverse pathways to engineering careers to all members of society and that dynamically and rapidly adapts to meet the changing needs of society and the nation's economy.”

=== Virginia Tech ===
After leaving the NSF in 2015, Riley moved on to be a professor of engineering education at Virginia Tech. Here she continued her research in engineering education and the ways that it intersects with science and technology studies. From June 2016- June 2017 Riley also served as the interim department head of the department of engineering education at Virginia Tech.

=== Purdue University ===
In 2017 Riley left Virginia Tech to become the Kamyar Haghighi Head of the School of Engineering Education at Purdue University.

=== University of New Mexico ===
On 15 November 2022, the University of New Mexico named Dr. Riley as the dean of the UNM School of Engineering, effective on 1 April 2023.

== Beliefs ==
Riley has criticized the concept of rigor in engineering because "its sexual connotations and links to masculinity in particular are undeniable".

== Major publications ==
Dr. Riley has published 2 books; Engineering and Social Justice (2008), and Engineering Thermodynamics and 21st century energy problems (2011). Engineering and social justice is a book aimed at introducing engineers to social justice theories and practices, and how engineering intersects with science and technology studies. Engineering Thermodynamics and 21st-century energy problems is meant to serve as a companion book to other thermodynamics textbooks and aims to place thermodynamics and its applications in a broader social context.

Dr. Riley is also published in the Journal of Women and Minorities in Science and Engineering, NWSA Journal, and Engineering Studies. Her articles explore authority in the classroom, feminism in engineering, and the role of rigor in shaping culture in STEM fields.

== Other publications ==
- Employing liberative pedagogies in engineering education (2003)
- Resisting neoliberalism in global development engineering (2007)

== Awards and recognition ==
Riley was awarded the NOGLSTP GLBTA Educator of the Year for 2010.
