= Arya Jeipea Karijo =

Kenyan human rights activist

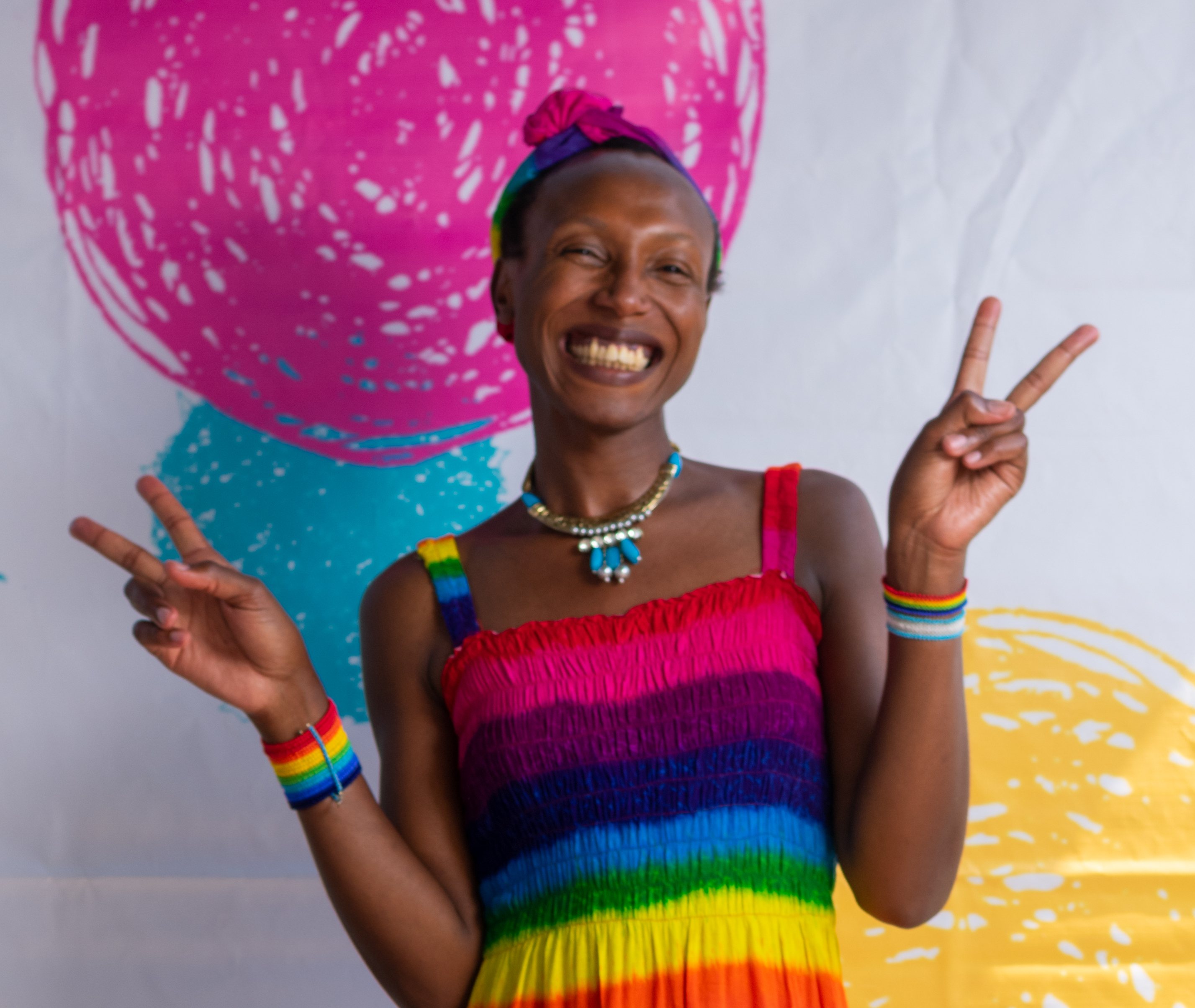
- Born: 1981 (age 44–45)
- Occupations: Activist, journalist, user experience designer

Arya Jeipea Karijo (born 1981) is a human rights activist, journalist and user experience designer from Kenya. She has written on how legacies of British colonisation negatively impact LGBTQ+ communities in Kenya. Karijo began to explore her gender identity whilst at university and has described how she did not have the language to describe her gender and transition for many years. She is a member of 500 Queer Scientists.
