= Walter Emil Westman =

American ecologist, researcher, and activist

- Born: Walter Emil Wieselmann; 5 November 1945; New York City
- Died: 3 January 1991 (aged 45); California
- Scientific career
- Fields: Ecology

Walter Emil Westman (5 November 1945 - 3 January 1991) was an American ecologist, researcher, and activist. He founded the National Organization of Gay and Lesbian Scientists and Technical Professionals (NOGLSTP) in 1980.

== Early life and education ==
Walter Emil was born to the Wieselmann family in 1945. The family changed their name to Westman in late 1949 when they moved to Puerto Rico, hoping to avoid antisemitism. He attended the Commonwealth School and excelled there. The family were forced to return to the US in 1955 when their glove factory failed.

Westman attended Swarthmore College, obtaining a bachelor's degree in botany in 1966. He moved to Australia shortly after completing his first degree as the recipient of a Fulbright Scholarship. He later received a master's degree from Macquarie University. He then returned to the US in order to complete his PhD at Cornell University under the supervision of Robert Whittaker, on the subject of pygmy forest ecosystems along the northwestern Californian coasts.

== Research and career ==
After completing his PhD in 1971, Westman participated in the American Political Science Association Congressional Fellowship Programme in Washington DC, during which time he helped draft amendments to the 1972 Water Pollution Control Act.

Westman held a number of academic appointments. He was a lecturer in ecology between 1972 and 1974 at the University of Queensland, Brisbane, Australia. He then moved back to the US in 1965 to take up an appointment in the School of Architecture and Urban Planning, UCLA, before moving to the Department of Geography UCLA, where he was promoted from Assistant to Full Professor between 1976 and 1984. At UCLA, he used his academic training in biology and geography to develop an international reputation on Californian coastal sage ecosystems, especially in relation to biogeography, ecology and responses to disturbance and environmental management. He was also one of the first academics responsible for training North American biogeographers in the geography / biology hybrid tradition.

In 1984, Westman left UCLA and joined the Office of Ecosystem Science and Technology at the NASA/Ames Research Center, San Francisco, as a research scientist. Through this appointment, he helped pioneer the use of remote sensing into the study of plant communities.

His transdisciplinary approach to coastal ecosystems drew together human and physical geography techniques, culminating in the influential book Ecology, Impact Assessment, and Environmental Planning, which integrated theoretical and applied ecology with impact assessment and policy development.

In addition to his interest in plant ecology, Westman was influential in the field of environmental policy. In addition to his book, he produced articles such as "How much are Nature's services worth?", which advised on the environmental policies of the US government at the time.

Westman left academia for a period of five years before his death in 1991, in order to focus on advisory roles and activism. However, he continued to work in science as a staff scientist in Ecology and Environmental Policy at the Lawrence Berkeley Laboratory at the University of California, Berkeley, where he continued to apply remote sensing techniques to detect tropical deforestation and vegetation stress, and work on ecological restoration.

== Activism ==
As an openly gay man, Westman was an advocate for LGBT rights and AIDS awareness. He founded the National Organization of Gay and Lesbian Scientists (NOGLS) (which is now known as the National Organization of Gay and Lesbian Scientists and Technical Professionals (NOGLSTP)) during a meeting of the American Association for the Advancement of Science (AAAS) in 1980. This meeting was his professional coming out, and was convened to discuss the problem of homophobia.

Westman ultimately resigned from his role on the board of directors in 1988, in order to focus on his work in AIDS activism. He promoted gay rights and campaigned for further research to find a cure for AIDS, right up until the end of his life.

== Legacy ==
Westman's papers are held at the Hargrett Rare Book and Manuscript Library, The University of Georgia Libraries.

The Walt Westman Award, awarded by the Out to Innovate professional society, is the highest recognition given to a member of the organization formerly known as NOGLSTP, in recognition of their significant contributions to the organisation's mission, and what it means to be an LGBTQ+ role model.
