= March for Science (disambiguation) =

The March for Science was a series of rallies held on Earth Day in 2017. March for Science may also refer to:

- March for Science Portland
- March for Science 2018
