= Autumn Kent =

American mathematician

- Education: B.A., University of North Carolina at Asheville, 1999; Ph.D., University of Texas at Austin, 2006
- Awards: 2019 Simons Fellow; Vilas Associate (2018–2019); von Neumann Fellow at the Institute for Advanced Study (2015–2016); National Science Foundation CAREER Award (2014); Frank Gerth Dissertation Award (1999)
- Scientific career
- Fields: Geometry, Topology
- Workplaces: University of Wisconsin–Madison
- Thesis: Geometry and algebra of hyperbolic 3-manifolds (2006)
- Doctoral advisor: Cameron Gordon

Autumn Kent is an American mathematician specializing in topology and geometry. She is a professor of mathematics and Vilas Associate at the University of Wisconsin. She is a transgender woman and a promoter of trans rights.

== Education ==
Kent received her B.A. from the University of North Carolina at Asheville in 1999. Originally, she had planned to become a high-school English teacher, but she switched to mathematics, majoring in it and in literature. She earned her Ph.D. under the advising of Cameron McAllan Gordon at the University of Texas at Austin in 2006; her dissertation was entitled Geometry and Algebra of Hyperbolic 3-manifolds. After a four-year position as the Tamarkin Assistant Professor of Mathematics at Brown University, she joined the faculty of University of Wisconsin–Madison in 2010. She became associate professor in 2016, and a full professor in 2020.

== Career ==
Kent has published over 20 papers in various journals, mostly regarding low dimensional topology and knot theory. Many of these were published under her former name, or deadname, before she came out as transgender.

Kent served on the Policy and Advocacy Committee for the Association for Women in Mathematics from February 2019 through January 2022. In addition, she served on the Association for Women in Mathematics Panel Discussion Promoting Inclusion in STEM at the 2019 Joint Mathematics Meeting. With Harrison Bray, she organized the LG&TBQ+ conference at the University of Michigan to foster collaboration between LGBTQ+ mathematicians working in geometry, topology, and dynamical systems with funding from Kent's NSF Career Award. She gave the Spectra Lavender Lecture at the 2022 Joint Mathematics Meeting.

== Recognition ==
In 1999, Kent won the Frank Gerth Dissertation Award. In 2014, she was awarded an NSF Career Award to study moduli of Riemann surfaces. In 2015 and 2016, she was a von Neumann Fellow at the Institute for Advanced Study. She was named as a Vilas Associate at the University of Wisconsin–Madison for 2018 and 2019. In 2019, she received a Simons Fellowship.

She was elected as a Fellow of the American Mathematical Society in the 2024 class of fellows.
