= Rochelle Diamond =

American biologist

- Born: Rochelle Anne Diamond; 1951 (age 74–75); Phoenix, Arizona
- Education: University of California, Santa Barbara
- Known for: Flow cytometry, cell sorting, activism
- Scientific career
- Workplaces: University of California, Los Angeles; California Institute of Technology

Rochelle Anne "Shelley" Diamond is a research biologist, queer activist, and chair emeritus of Out to Innovate, formerly known as National Organization of Gay and Lesbian Scientists and Technical Professionals. She was the Director of California Institute of Technology's Flow Cytometry and Cell Sorting Shared Resource Laboratory 1982-2024 and also the Lab Manager for Ellen Rothenberg's research lab (1982–present).

== Early life and education ==
Diamond grew up in Phoenix, Arizona and was a tomboy as a child. After college, Diamond married a man who was a friend. Her husband was aware that she was lesbian, but was somewhat accepting. They divorced after 10 years of marriage.

Diamond came out to her family as lesbian in her 20s. Diamond earned a dual bachelor's degree in biochemistry and molecular biology from the University of California, Santa Barbara in 1974.

== Career ==
Diamond was the applications specialist and Director of the flow cytometry and cell sorting shared resource laboratory at the California Institute of Technology in Pasadena, California (1982–2024). She also is the lab manager for Ellen Rothenberg (scientist)'s research lab. The lab studies immature cells in the immune system and the signals that influence what specialist roles the cells take on.

She is a Fellow of the American Association for the Advancement of Science (AAAS) (elected 2008).

== Activism ==
Diamond became interested in activism after experiencing homophobia in her personal and professional life. In 1981, she was forced out of City of Hope Research Institute where she worked because a coworker discovered she was gay and began sabotaging her lab experiments.

Diamond helped start the National Organization of Gay and Lesbian Scientists and Technical Professionals (NOGLSTP), now called Out to Innovate, an organization that enables young queer scientists to network with each other. She is now the chair emeritus of the organization. Diamond has devoted her work with NOGLSTP to empowering LGBTQ+ people in STEM and fighting against discrimination that LGBTQ+ individuals face in the workplace. She believes that "scientists and engineers are more productive when they can be themselves". Part of her work to increase the visibility of queer people in STEM includes keep a running list of "queer scientists of historical note" and supporting a mentoring program for young students and scientists to meet older people in their careers of choice.

== Personal life ==
Diamond married chemist Barbara Belmont after they met in the queer activist community in Los Angeles. They have been married for more than 30 years.
