= Anthony D'Augelli =

Anthony Raymond D'Augelli is Associate Dean for Undergraduate Programs and Outreach, as well as Professor of Human Development and Family Studies, at Pennsylvania State University. He is best known for his LGB identity development theory, as well as his research on LGB youth, rural LGB populations, and the impact of anti-gay victimization on LGB mental health.

== Education ==
D'Augelli earned his bachelor's degree in psychology/social sciences from Hofstra University in 1968. He then earned his master's degree in clinical/community psychology at the University of Connecticut at Storrs in 1970, then completed his Ph.D. in clinical/community psychology at the University of Connecticut at Storrs in 1972.

== Career ==
In 1977, D'Augelli worked as the director of evaluation of the Community Helpers Project established by Pennsylvania State University to provide preventive mental health services for rural communities. Since then he had worked as a director of intervention programs, a psychologist, and a psychology professor. In 2004 he was hired by the Department of Human Development and Family Studies of Pennsylvania State University to teach undergraduate and graduate students, as well as to conduct research. In 2006 he accepted the position of Associate Dean for Undergraduate Programs and Outreach at Pennsylvania State University, but continues his work as professor in the department as well.

D'Augelli's research and publication agenda originally focused on helping, the training of mental health professionals, interventions, preventive mental health disorders, and eating disorders. He began to focus on sexuality and lesbian, gay, and bisexual populations in rural, higher education, and urban settings the 1980s. D'Augelli was one of the first researchers to publish scholarly articles on the experiences of LGB college students, as well as perceptions of LGB people by heterosexual students, and made an effort to capture the experiences of LGB and straight populations of color in his research.

D'Augelli serves on the editorial boards of Journal of LGBT Youth, Journal of GLBT Family Studies, Sexuality Research and Social Policy, Journal of Gay & Mental Health, and Suicide and Life-Threatening Behavior.

== Work ==
D'Augelli is a prolific researcher and academic author. He is best known for his "homosexual lifespan development model", which he later extended to lesbian and bisexual identity development and renamed the lesbian, gay, bisexual (LGB) lifespan development model.

D'Augelli's Lifespan Model of Lesbian Gay Bisexual Identity Development
D'Augelli published his initial "homosexual lifespan development model" in 1994. According to D'Augelli, identity is shaped by sociocultural contexts. As an individual's awareness of social circumstances changes over time, the individual's identity development will also change. D'Augelli believes that a direct connection exists between sociocultural context, perception of safety, and lesbian, gay, bisexual identity development. D'Augelli stated that other models of identity development reinforce heteronormativity, and that lesbian, gay, and bisexual identity development is often socially conditioned by fear and shame.

Unlike Vivienne Cass' stage theory of lesbian and gay identity development, D'Augelli's identity development theory focused on processes that could occur multiple times or not at all, as LGB people often must navigate the coming out process repeatedly across their lifespan. D'Augelli also recognized that LGB identity development could go dormant, then start again later in life—or simply begin when an individual perceived that it would be safe to come out.

D'Augelli's lifespan identity development model consists of the following processes:
1. Exiting a heterosexual identity
2. Developing a personal lesbian, gay, or bisexual identity status
3. Developing a lesbian, gay, or bisexual social identity
4. Claiming identity as an LGB offspring
5. Developing an LGB intimacy status
6. Entering an LGB community

An individual may experience the following processes at different times during their lifespan. Each process may occur more than once over the course of one's lifespan, or not at all. Connection with social networks also impact lesbian, gay, and bisexual identity development across the lifespan. D'Augelli's LGB lifespan identity development model also introduced the concept that sexual orientation could be fluid, and that sexual identity could occur on a spectrum as opposed to a binary.

== Awards ==
D'Augelli has earned awards in 1991, 1995, and 2000 from the American Psychological Association for his pioneering and influential research on LGB populations.

== Selected publications ==
Books
D'Augelli, Anthony R., D'Augelli, Judith Frankel & Danish, Steven J. (1981). Helping others. Monterey, CA: Brooks/Cole Publishers.
D'Augelli, Anthony R. & Patterson, Charlotte. (1995). 'Lesbian, gay, and bisexual identities over the lifespan: psychological perspectives. New York: Oxford University Press.
D'Augelli, Anthony R. & Patterson, Charlotte. (2001). Lesbian, gay, and bisexual identities and youth: psychological perspectives. New York: Oxford University Press.
D'Augelli, Anthony R. & Patterson, Charlotte. (2013). Handbook of psychology and sexual orientation. New York: Oxford University Press.
Patterson, Charlotte & D'Augelli, Anthony R. (1998). Lesbian, gay, and bisexual identities in families. New York: Oxford University Press.
Preston, D.B. & D'Augelli, A.R. (2013). The Challenges of Being a Rural Gay Man: Coping With Stigma. New York: Routledge.

Book Chapters
D'Augelli, Anthony R. (1998). "Developmental Implications of Victimization of Lesbian, Gay, and Bisexual Youths." In Gregory M. Herek (Ed.) Stigma and Sexual Orientation: Understanding Prejudice against Lesbians, Gay Men, and Bisexuals. Thousand Oaks, CA: SAGE Publications. pp. 187–210.
D'Augelli, Anthony R. (1991). Teaching Lesbian and Gay Development: A Pedagogy of the Oppressed. In W.G. Tierney (Ed.) Culture and Ideology in Higher Education: Advancing a Critical Agenda. New York: Praeger. pp. 213–233.
D'Augelli, Anthony R. (1994). "Identity Development and Sexual Orientation: Toward a Model of Lesbian, Gay, and Bisexual Development." In Edison J. Trickett, Roderick J. Watts, and Dina Birman (Eds.) Human Diversity: Perspectives on People in Context. San Francisco, CA: Jossey-Bass. pp. 312–333.
D'Augelli, Anthony R. & D'Augelli, Judith Frankel. (1985). The Enhancement of Sexual Skills and Competence: Promoting Lifelong Sexual Unfolding. In L.L. Abate and M. Milan (Eds.) Handbook of Social Skills Training and Research. New York: John Wiley. pp. 170–191.
D'Augelli, Anthony R., Preston, D.B., Cain, R.E. & Schulze, R.F. (2007). Sexual Behavior Patterns of Men Who Have Sex with Men: Description and Implications for Intervention. In P.S. Fahs (Ed.) Conversations in the Disciplines: Sustaining Rural Populations. Binghamton, NY: SUNY Binghamton Press. pp. 111–135.

Journal Articles
D'Augelli, Anthony R. (1988). The adolescent closet: Promoting the development of the lesbian teenager. The School Psychologist, 42, pp. 2–3.
D'Augelli, Anthony R. (1988). Community psychology and AIDS. The Community Psychologist, 21, pp. 39–41.
D'Augelli, Anthony R. (1988). Sexual harassment and affectional status: The hidden discrimination. Community Psychologist, 21, pp. 11–12.
D'Augelli, Anthony R. (1989). AIDS fears and homophobia among volunteers in an AIDS prevention program. Journal of Rural Community Psychology, 10, pp. 29–39. D'Augelli, Anthony R. (1989). Lesbian women in a rural helping network: Exploring information resources. Women and Therapy, 8, pp. 119–130.
D'Augelli, Anthony R. (1989). The development of informal helping resources for lesbian women and gay men: a case study in community psychology. Journal of Community Psychology, 17, pp. 18–29.
D'Augelli, Anthony R. (1989). Homophobia in a university community: Views of prospective assistants. Journal of College Student Development, 30, pp. 546–552.
D'Augelli, Anthony R. (1989). Gay men's and lesbians' experiences of discrimination, harassment, violence, and difference in a university community. American Journal of Community Psychology, 17, pp. 317–321.
D'Augelli, Anthony R. (1990). Case analysis: A shy gay male. Journal of Gay and Lesbian Psychotherapy, 1, pp. 3–5.
D'Augelli, Anthony R. (1990). Community psychology and the HIV epidemic: The Development of Helping Communities. Journal of Community Psychology, 18, pp. 337–346.
D'Augelli, Anthony R. (1990). Homophobia in a university community: Attitudes and experiences of white heterosexual freshmen. Journal of College Student Development, 31, pp. 484–491.
D'Augelli, Anthony R. (1991). Gay men in college: Identity processes and adaptations. Journal of College Student Development, 32, pp. 140–146.
D'Augelli, Anthony R. (1991). Lesbians and gay men on campus: Visibility, empowerment, and leadership. Peabody Journal of Education, 66, pp. 124–142.
D'Augelli, Anthony R. (1992). Lesbian and gay male undergraduates' experiences of harassment and fear on campus. Journal of Interpersonal Violence, 7, pp. 383–395.
D'Augelli, Anthony R. (1992). Lesbian/gay development: Pedagogy of the oppressed. Journal of Homosexuality, 22, pp. 213–226.
D'Augelli, Anthony R. (1993). Preventing mental health problems among lesbian and gay college students. Journal of Primary Prevention, 13 (4), pp. 1–17.
D'Augelli, Anthony R. & Hart, M.M. (1987). Gay women, men, and families in rural settings: Toward the development of helping communities. American Journal of Community Psychology, 15, pp. 79-93.
D'Augelli, Anthony R., Hart, M.M., & Collins, C. (1987). Social support patterns in a rural network of lesbian women. Journal of Rural Community Psychology, 8, pp. 12–22. (/br) D'Augelli, Anthony R., Grossman, A.H., & Starks, M.T. (2008). Families of lesbian, gay, and bisexual youth: what do parents and siblings know and how do they react? Journal of GLBT Family Studies, 4 (1), pp. 95–115.
D'Augelli, Anthony R., Grossman, A.H., & Starks, M.T. (2006). Childhood gender atypicality, victimization, and PTSD among lesbian, gay, and bisexual youth. Journal of Interpersonal Violence, 21, pp. 1–21.
D'Augelli, Anthony R., Grossman, A.H., & Starks, M.T. (2008). Gender atypicality and sexual development among lesbian, gay, and bisexual youth: prevalence, sex differences, and parental responses. Journal of Gay & Lesbian Mental Health, 12 (1/2), pp. 121–143.
D'Augelli, Anthony R., Grossman, A.H., Starks, M.T. & Sinclair, K.O. (2010). Factors associated with parents' knowledge of lesbian, gay, and bisexual youths' sexual orientation. Journal of Family Studies, 6 (2), pp. 1–21.
