= Tristram Wyatt =

British evolutionary biologist and author

- Born: 16 December 1956 (age 69)
- Education: University of Cambridge (PhD)
- Scientific career
- Fields: Evolutionary biology, animal behaviour, pheromones
- Workplaces: University of Leeds; University of Oxford
- Thesis: The ecology of parental care in the saltmarsh beetle Bledius spectabilis (1983)

Tristram Dick Wyatt (16 December 1956) is a British evolutionary biologist and author. He is a senior research fellow in the Department of Zoology, University of Oxford and an emeritus fellow of Kellogg College, Oxford. Wyatt researches pheromones and animal behavior.

== Education ==
Wyatt completed a PhD in animal behaviour at University of Cambridge. His 1983 dissertation was titled The ecology of parental care in the saltmarsh beetle Bledius spectabilis.

== Academic career ==
Wyatt was a lecturer at University of Leeds and conducted research fellowships at University of California, Berkeley and Cardiff University. He joined the Oxford University Department for Continuing Education in 1989 as a university lecturer of biological sciences. From 2000 to 2005, Wyatt was University of Oxford's director of distance and online learning. In 2015, he gave a TEDx talk entitled The smelly mystery of the human pheromone. Wyatt is a senior research fellow in the Department of Biology, University of Oxford and an emeritus fellow of Kellogg College, Oxford. He is a visiting lecturer at University College London.

Wyatt researches the evolution of pheromones and animal behaviour.

== Personal life ==
Wyatt is gay and married to a photographer and artist. He founded the Oxford Area Academic LGBT Staff Network. In 2009, Wyatt co-founded University of Oxford's official LGBT+ Staff Network which started the annual Oxford University LGBT history-month lecture. In 2013, he supported the LGBT Staff Network i600 at Imperial College London. Wyatt has spoken at the UK LGBT STEMinar, Oxford Pride, and the Royal Society during Pride in London.

== Awards and honours ==
In 2014, Wyatt's book, Pheromones and Animal Behaviour, won the Royal Society of Biology's best postgraduate textbook prize.

== Selected works ==
=== Books ===
- Wyatt, Tristram D. (2003). Pheromones and Animal Behavior: Communication by Smell and Taste. Cambridge University Press. ISBN 9780521485265.
- Wyatt, Tristram D. (2014). Pheromones and Animal Behavior: Chemical Signals and Signatures. Cambridge University Press. ISBN 9780521112901.
- Wyatt, Tristram D. (2017). Animal Behavior: A Very Short Introduction. Oxford University Press. ISBN 9780198712152.
