= Sean Whelan (scientist) =

British-American virologist

Professor Sean P.J. Whelan Ph.D.
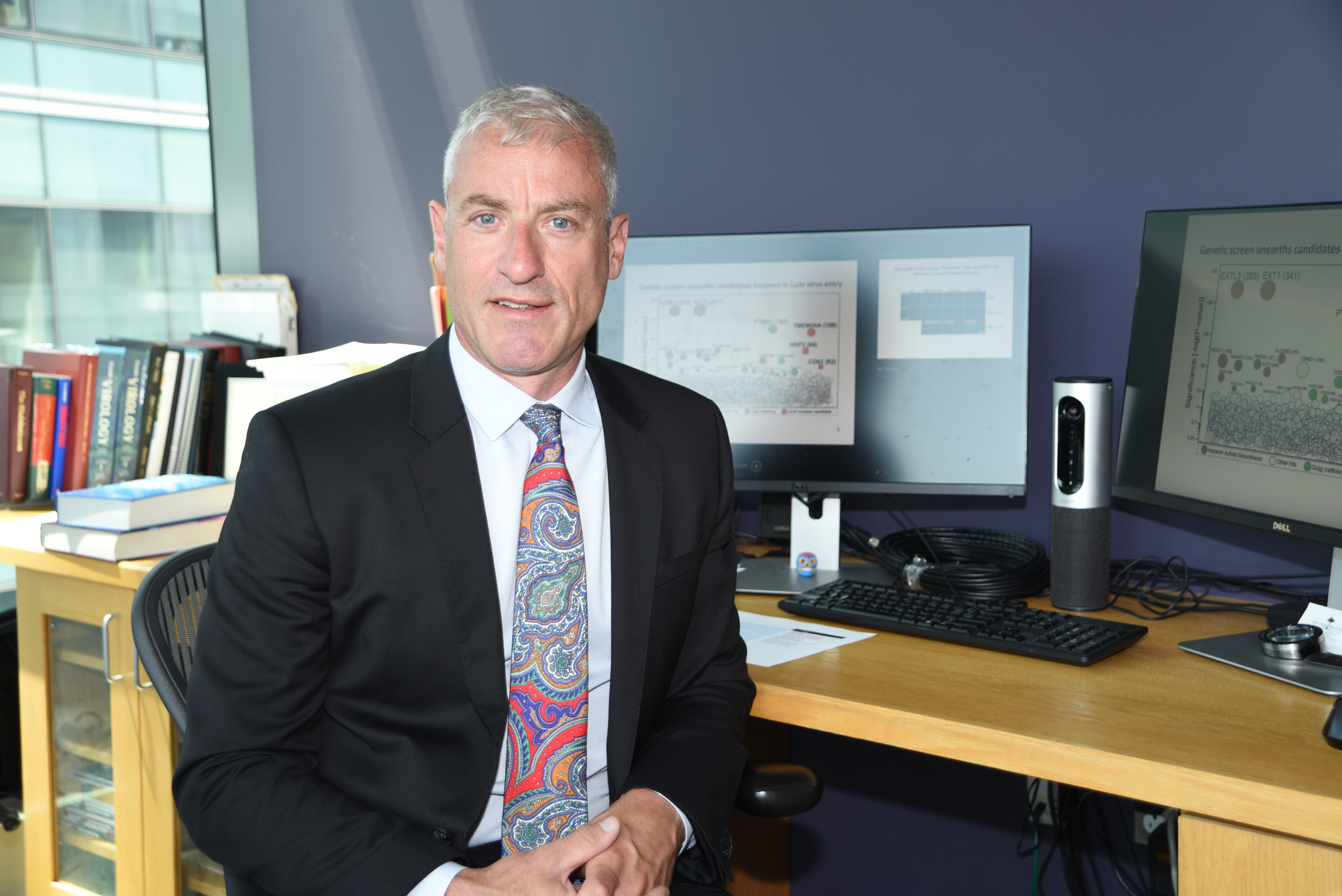
- Sean Whelan in 2019
- Born: 1967 (age 58–59); Leeds, England
- Citizenship: US and UK
- Education: University of Birmingham, England
- Scientific career
- Workplaces: Harvard Medical School; Washington University in St. Louis
- Thesis: Alteration of the Cellular Binding Characteristics of Poliovirus (1993)
- Doctoral advisor: Jeffrey Almond, University of Reading
- Other academic advisors: Gail Wertz, University of Alabama
- Website: http://www.whelan-lab.org/

Sean Whelan is a British-American virologist. He is known for identifying the cellular protein used as a receptor by Ebola virus, for defining the entry pathway that rabies virus uses to enter neurons, and for identifying the ribosome as a possible target for antiviral drugs. In July 2019, he was announced as the new Chair of the Department of Molecular Microbiology at Washington University School of Medicine in St Louis, Missouri. In February 2020, Whelan was recognized as the LGBTQ+ Scientist of the Year 2020 by the National Organization of Gay and Lesbian Scientists and Technical Professionals.

== Education ==
Whelan received a First Class Honors degree in Microbiology and Biochemistry from the University of Birmingham. He performed his PhD work with noted virologist Jeffrey Almond, then at the University of Reading.

== Career ==
Whelan joined Harvard Medical School's Department of Microbiology and Molecular Genetics in 2002. He was promoted to Professor of Microbiology and Immunobiology in 2012. He served as head of Harvard's PhD Program in Virology, and directed an NIH-funded Center for Excellence in Translational Research. In July 2019, Washington University in St. Louis announced that Whelan had been named Chair of the Department of Molecular Microbiology and the Marvin A. Brennecke Distinguished Professor of Microbiology at Washington University School of Medicine.

Whelan's research focuses on using Vesicular Stomatitis Virus (VSV) as a model system for negative-sense single-stranded RNA viruses such as the rabies, measles and Ebola viruses. He began this work as a post-doc in the laboratory of Professor Gail Wertz, developing a system for expressing infectious VSV particles from cDNA clones, which led to a patent on VSV-based gene therapy vectors and vaccines. VSV pseudotypes, which carry the envelope proteins of other viruses, are useful tools for studying the behavior of pathogenic viruses. Whelan has used this approach to study the entry process of Ebola, to identify the cellular protein the virus uses as a receptor, and to study how the rabies virus infects neurons.

Whelan also studies the viral life cycle of VSV to identify potential antiviral targets. He identified a specific subunit of the ribosome, RPL40, as being essential to initiate translation of VSV mRNAs. This selective mechanism allows the virus to block translation of host mRNAs without preventing the production of its own proteins. Interfering with this mechanism could lead to antiviral therapies. With Stephen C. Harrison, he used cryo-EM to determine the structure of the L protein of VSV, revealing several potential drug targets.

=== Advocacy ===
As a founding member of the group "Scientists for Science", Whelan has argued that research into infectious pathogens is "essential for a comprehensive understanding of microbial disease pathogenesis, prevention and treatment", and that further regulation of work on dangerous pathogens should only be considered in the context of "input from outside experts with the background and skills to conduct actual risk assessments based on specific experiments and existing laboratories".

== Awards ==
- 2005 Burroughs Wellcome Fund Investigator in Pathogenesis of Infectious Disease
- 2010 Genzyme Young Innovator Award
- 2011 Hoffmann-La Roche Investigator in Molecular Virology
- 2013 American Academy of Microbiology Fellow
- 2015 NIH MERIT award
- 2020 NOGLSTP LGBTQ+ Scientist of the Year.
