= Clara Barker =

British engineer, material scientist, and LGBT advocate

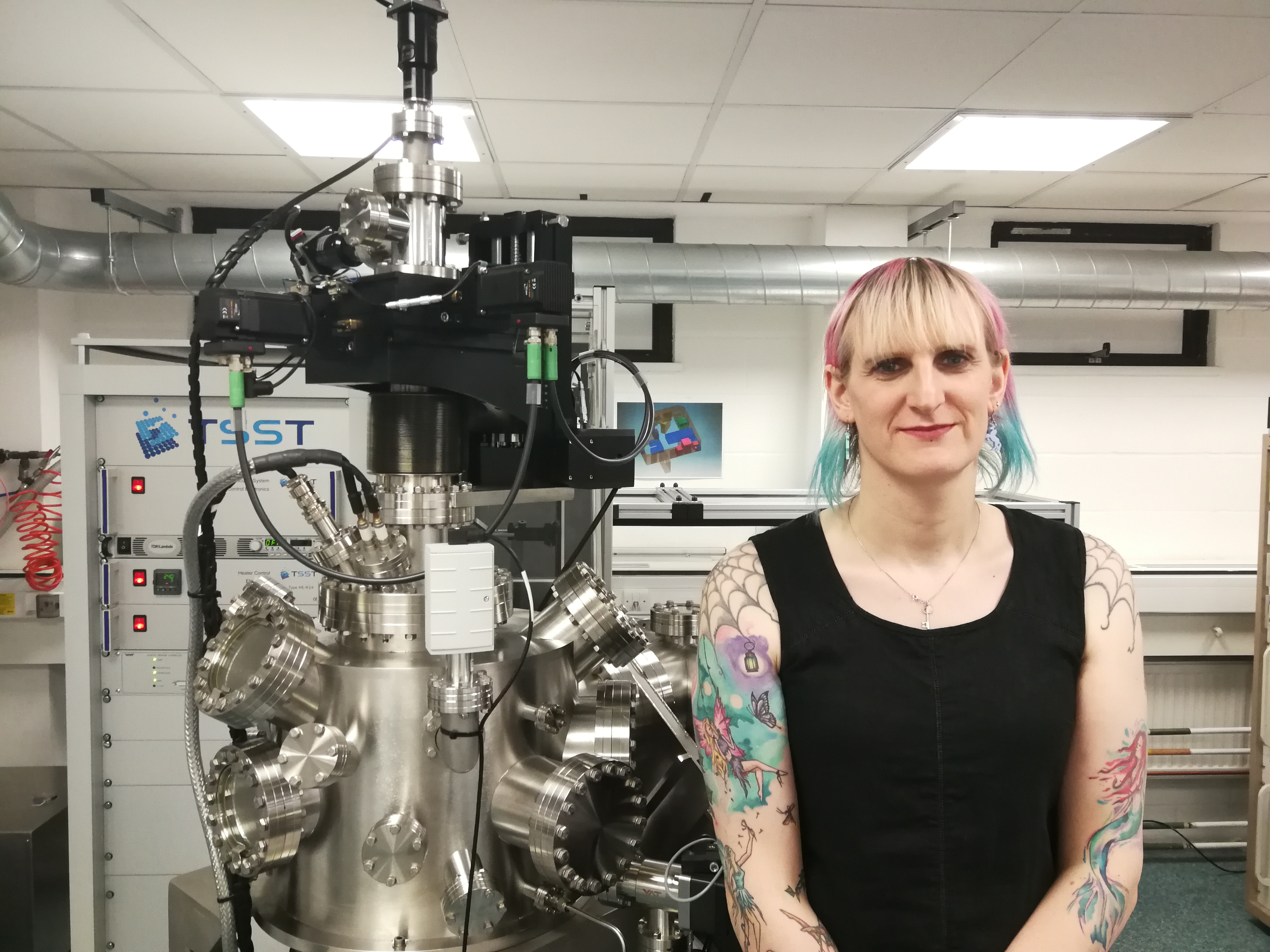
- Barker standing next to a pulsed laser deposition tool
- Title: Technical Lab Manager

Academic background
- Education: Manchester Metropolitan University
- Thesis: A New Route to high-Performance Functional Films on Polymeric Web

Clara Michelle Barker is a British engineer and material scientist. In 2017 she received the Points of Light award from the UK Prime Minister's Office for her volunteer work raising awareness of lesbian, gay, bisexual and transgender issues. The outcome of this was her rise as a significant role model to the LGBT+ community.

== Career and research ==
Barker completed her thesis on thin film coating at Manchester Metropolitan University. She then held a post-doctoral position at the Swiss Federal Laboratories for Materials Science and Technology (EMPA) in Switzerland for four years, before she moved to the University of Oxford, where she manages the Centre for Applied Superconductivity within the Materials Department. Her current research focuses on creating thin film high temperature superconductors that could be used a resonators for quantum computing devices.

Barker is currently a Daphne Jackson Trust research fellow and Dean for equality and diversity at Linacre College. She is a member of the Royal Society Diversity and Inclusion Committee. She was the vice-chair of the university's LGBT+ Advisory Group. In 2023, she was featured in place of the Seven Sisters tube station in the Engineering Icons Tube Map. In November 2023 she was appointed Inclusion and Diversity Representative by the Institute of Physics, taking over the position from Helen Gleeson.

== LGBT+ advocacy ==
Barker is a transgender woman and an advocate for LGBT+ diversity and women in STEM. She works with a youth group in Oxfordshire, TOPAZ. She has also spoken local schools on behalf of Stonewall and has helped Oxford City Council run an anti-HBT bullying initiative. In 2017, she was featured in a Stonewall poster campaign for Trans Day of Visibility. She also led the promotion of the Out in Oxford project, a project which highlights LGBT+ artefacts in museums. She has given numerous talks on LGBT+ visibility and diversity in STEM. In December 2018 Barker gave a TEDx talk entitled "Why we need to build trust to create diversity in institutions". She has also appeared on BBC Victoria Derbyshire and Sky News talking about transgender rights.

== Awards and honors ==
Barker has received several awards for her advocacy. In 2017 she was the 795th person to receive the Points of Light award for her work with Out in Oxford and her other volunteering. Her belief is that role models are necessary in all aspects of life. Her representation in STEM has been pivotal for younger generations to follow in her footsteps.

In 2018, she won the staff Individual Champion/Role Model award in the Vice-Chancellor's Diversity Awards from the University of Oxford.
