= Out to Innovate =

Out to Innovate, previously known as the National Organization of Gay and Lesbian Scientists and Technical Professionals (NOGLSTP), is a professional society for professionals in science, technology, mathematics, and engineering. Each year, Out to Innovate gives the Walt Westman Award to members who helped make significant contributions to the association's mission.

== History ==
The organization was organized along the lines of earlier organizations of gay scientists in Los Angeles and the Research Triangle area of North Carolina, and arose out of a session at the 1980 American Association for the Advancement of Science (AAAS) meeting. It was formally organized in 1983 and incorporated in California in 1991. The foundation of the organization was in response to issues such as gay scientists not being able to get visas to immigrate to the United States or security clearances to work in government laboratories, the lack of research on LGBT health issues, and loss of productivity due to the stress of stigmatization. Much of the organization's early work related to increasing the visibility of LGBT scientists and opposing homophobia. In the 1990s, it focused on encouraging corporations to adopt nondiscrimination policies and assisted in a 1995 Government Accounting Office report that recommended that LGBT status should not be considered a vulnerability to blackmail in security clearance investigations. In the 2000s and 2010s, awards for LGBT scientists, engineers, and STEM educators were established.

== Programs and partnerships ==
Out to Innovate supports regional groups and caucuses who choose to affiliate with Out to Innovate. Out to Innovate affiliates and partners with other national STEM organizations, including AAAS. Out to Innovate also organizes a mentoring network, a scholarship program for students, and a biannual career summit.

=== Out Astronaut Project ===
In July 2019, Out to Innovate partnered with the Out Astronaut Project, a nonprofit initiative aimed at sending the first out LGBTQIA+ astronaut into space. The goal of the partnership, according to a press release from OAP, is to "provide opportunities for LGBTQ persons to become actively involved in space-related research." The goals of OAP, beyond sending the first LGBTQIA+ astronaut into space includes providing a robust presence in STEM fields for LGBTQIA+ individuals "by highlighting the contributions of LGBTQ members currently working in science and space while providing grants to promising LGBTQ students." On September 24, 2019, the OAP announced via Facebook that they had found the winner of the first phase of their project.

=== Other affiliations ===
Out to Innovate has a number of other partnerships and affiliations. They include: The American Association for the Advancement of Science, the National Postdoctoral Association, and the American Chemical Society.

== LGBTQ+ Annual Recognition Awards ==
Out to Innovate recognizes an LGBTQ+ Scientist, Engineer, and Educator each year "who has made outstanding contributions to their field". In addition, they give the Walt Westman Award to recognize Out to Innovate members who have significantly advanced Out to Innovate's mission.

Awardees are:

Year	Educator	Engineer	Scientist	Walt Westman
2004	–	—	Larry Wagner	Rochelle Diamond
2005	–	Lynn Conway	Sim Aberson	—
2006	Denice Denton	Peter Ventzek	Kerry Sieh	Michael Parga
2007	Karl Mauzey	Tim Gill	Carolyn Bertozzi	Christopher Bannochie
2008	Michael Falk	Michael Steinberg	Arnold Zwicky	—
2009	Virginia Uribe	Anthony J. Gingess	James Nowick	—
2010	Donna Riley	Jay Keasling	Jesse Michael Bering	—
2011	Ron Buckmire	William Huffman	Bill Hendrix	—
2012	Mark Pope	Charles Lickel	Martin Lo	Amy Ross
2013	—	—	—	—
2014	Timothy Atherton	Christine Bland	Nergis Mavalvala	John Burke
2015	—	—	—	—
2016	—	—	—	—
2017	Anthony Butterfield	Wolfgang Sigmund	Matthew McGill	Barbara Belmont
2018	Biswajit Paul	David Taubenheim	Dannelle Tanner	—
2019	Benny Chan	Arianna Morales	Jon Freeman	Lauren Esposito
2020	Sara Brownell	Jonathan Dell	Sean Whelan	—
2021	Miles Ott	Guillermo Díaz-Fañas	Joseph Romano	Daniele Cherniak
2022	Luis Leyva	Lt. Col. Bree Fram	Jane Rigby	—
2023	Ramón Barthélemy	E. David Jansing	Victoria Orphan	—
Year	Educator	Engineer	Scientist	Walt Westman
