= Sally Aitken (academic) =

Canadian professor (born 1961)

Sally Nora Aitken
- Spouse: Jack Woods

Academic background
- Education: University of British Columbia (B.S.F, M.Sc.); University of California, Berkeley (PhD)
- Thesis: Population genetics of Pinus contorta on coastal and pygmy-forest sites in Mendocino County, California (1990)

Academic work
- Discipline: Forestry, Conservation genetics
- Institutions: University of British Columbia

Sally Nora Aitken FRSC (born 1961) is a Canadian environmentalist and academic. She has worked with government and industry to use knowledge from forest genetics research to forest management, tree breeding, and genetic conservation.

As of February 2024 she is a professor at the University of British Columbia.

== Early life and education ==
Sally Nora Aitken was born in 1961 in Calgary, Alberta, Canada.

In 1984 she obtained her B.Sc. from the University of British Columbia (UBC) in Vancouver. following this she earned her M.Sc. in 1986 and Ph.D. in 1989, both from the University of California, Berkeley.

== Academic career ==
From 1991 to 1996 Aitken worked as a research assistant professor at Oregon State University in Corvallis in the United States.

In 1996 she returned to UBC as assistant professor, being appointed associate professor in 2000, a position she held until 2005. She held a position as a NSERC Industrial Research Chair at UBC.

In 2001, Aitken helped start the Centre for Forest Conservation Genetics at UBC alongside Tongli Wang.

== Other projects and roles ==
Aitken has worked with government and industry to use knowledge from forest genetics research to forest management, tree breeding, and genetic conservation.

In 2012, Aitken became a co-ordinator of the BC BigTree Registry, an online registry that documents big trees of each species in British Columbia. She also initiated (with co-Project Leader Andreas Hamann and collaborators) a large-scale applied genomics project titled "AdapTree", which aimed to use genomics and climate-mapping technologies to help reforestation sites improve forest conditions, focussing on lodgepole pine and interior spruce.

== Recognition ==
In 2009, Aitken was awarded the Canadian Forestry Scientific Achievement Award and a year later was awarded the UBC Killiam Teaching Prize.

Due to her involvement with AdapTree, in 2014 Aitken was awarded the IUFRO Scientific Achievement Award for her research into the field of forest conservation genetics. She was also named a Wall Scholar in the Peter Wall Institute for Advanced Studies.

In 2017, Aitken was elected a Fellow of the Royal Society of Canada in the Life Science Division.

In 2018, she was named the recipient of the Genome BC Award for Scientific Excellence by the non-profit organization LifeSciences BC.

Other recognition and awards include:

- 2010: UBC Killam Teaching Prize
- 2014: Wall Scholar, Peter Wall Institute for Advanced Studies

== Selected publications ==
As of 2019, Aitken's publications are listed on WorldCat as follows:

- Genetic relationships among wood quality, growth rates and seedling physiology in interior lodgepole pine (1999)
- Conservation and the genetics of populations (2013)

== Personal life ==
Aitken married forestry professional Jack Woods.
