= Cynthia Bauerle =

American molecular biologist and college administrator

- Citizenship: United States
- Education: University of Virginia, University of Wisconsin-Madison
- Scientific career
- Fields: Molecular biology
- Workplaces: Hamline University Spelman College Howard Hughes Medical Institute James Madison University

Cynthia M. Bauerle is an American molecular biologist and college administrator. They are currently the interim vice provost for Faculty and Curriculum at James Madison University.

== Early life and education ==
Bauerle is from Charlottesville, Virginia. They completed a B.A. in biology at University of Virginia in 1984 and a Ph.D. in molecular biology at University of Wisconsin–Madison in 1990. Bauerle was a postdoctoral fellow at University of Oregon, where they researched molecular biology. They were a Fulbright scholar at University of Dar es Salaam from 1999 to 2000.

== Career ==
Bauerle was a professor of biology and women's studies at Hamline University for 12 years before joining Spelman College, where they were a professor and department chair of biology. Bauerle moved to Howard Hughes Medical Institute (HHMI) for seven years as a senior program officer and later, the assistant director of Precollege and Undergraduate Science Education. They were also the assistant director in undergraduate and graduate science education at HHMI. They managed the science education portfolio of grants, fellowships, and special initiatives. Bauerle oversaw multi-institutional initiatives to improve science education and student persistence in STEM and coordinated the NEXUS project. On July 1, 2016, Bauerle became a professor of biology and dean of the James Madison University College of Science and Mathematics, succeeding David Brakke.

Their research background is in cellular and molecular biology, with an early focus on the transport of thylakoid proteins and translocation of plastocyanin precursors in chloroplasts. Some of their subsequent research focused on ATPase and genetics in yeast.

== Awards and recognition ==
Bauerle is a HERS Leadership Institute alumni from 2013 and was elected as an AAAS Fellow in 2016. They were a 2018 Partnership for Undergraduate Life Sciences Education (PULSE) ambassador and a 2019 AAAS Council Delegate for the Section on Education.

== Personal life ==
Bauerle is genderqueer, and uses she/her, he/him, and they/them pronouns. They are a parent and are in a multi-racial and same-sex relationship.
