= David K. Smith =

British chemist

- Education: University of Oxford
- Known for: YouTube chemistry education channel
- Scientific career
- Fields: Nanochemistry
- Workplaces: University of York
- Website: www.york.ac.uk/chemistry/staff/academic/o-s/dsmith/

David Kelham Smith is a professor of chemistry at the University of York in England. His research focuses on nanochemistry and self-assembling nanomaterials. Smith is also well known for his education and public outreach activities, such as his channel dedicated to combatting chemistry disparagement. Smith is openly gay and has been described as "one of the most visible out gay scientists."

== Academic career ==
Smith received his undergraduate degree from the University of Oxford in 1992 and his Ph.D. in 1996 under the supervision of Paul Beer, after which he was a postdoctoral fellow with François Diederich. He began his career as a lecturer at University of York in 1999 and was promoted to professor in 2006.

== Research ==
Smith's research group studies the properties of nanomaterials, particularly self-assembling molecular gels, which may have a variety of practical applications including in biomaterials and in the construction of molecular electronics. He became interested in applications to biomaterials after observing the medical treatments needed by his late partner, who had cystic fibrosis, and has studied the potential applications of nanogels in drug delivery.

Smith was awarded the Bob Hay Lectureship in 2010 and the Corday Morgan Award in 2012 by the Royal Society of Chemistry in recognition of his contributions to the field.

== Teaching and outreach ==
Smith is the Chair of Teaching in the University of York Chemistry Department and is well known for his interest in chemistry education and public outreach about chemistry-related topics. He frequently speaks at public events and to schoolchildren about his personal experience as a scientist. He also maintains a widely followed YouTube channel for chemistry education and has published on his experiences using video as an educational tool.

Smith received the Royal Society of Chemistry's Higher Education Award in 2005, awarded a National Teaching Fellowship in 2013, and was named as one of 175 Faces of Chemistry in 2015. In 2025, Smith was part of the team which was awarded the Royal Society of Chemistry's Horizon Prize for Education for the project "Decolonising the Chemistry Curriculum".

In addition to science education work, Smith also writes about diversity in science and about the need for scientist role models from the LGBT community.
