= Pride in STEM =

UK LGBT+ charity

- Founded: 2016
- Founders: Alfredo Carpineti, Chris Carpineti, Matt Young
- Legal status: Charitable trust
- Website: prideinstem.org

Pride in STEM is a UK-based charity supporting LGBT+ scientists internationally, co-founded in 2016 by Alfredo Carpineti, a senior staff writer and space correspondent at IFLScience, his husband Chris, and Matt Young, a researcher at the University of Nottingham. Its origins, prior to registration as a charitable trust, were as a marching group for the parade at Pride in London. Ben Britton, one of the organisation's trustees, wrote in 2019 that the organisation's "informal mantra is to queer up science spaces and science up queer spaces". "STEM" is an acronym for "science, technology, engineering and maths/medicine".

== Events ==
=== Out Thinkers ===
The organisation organises a series of events called "Out Thinkers", first held in 2016, at which LGBT+ scientists discuss their life and work. Events in the series have been held at the British Science Festival, at Imperial College London, at the Science Museum, London, and at the Cambridge Science Festival. The first international Out Thinkers event was held in 2018.

=== LGBTSTEM Day ===
They were responsible, along with two other British Isles-based organisations, for organising the first LGBTSTEM Day, which was held on 5 July 2018, which promotes visibility and awareness of LGBT+ people in the sciences. The event was supported by the Royal Astronomical Society, Institute of Physics, and the Royal Society of Chemistry.

The following year, nine groups (including Pride in STEM) were involved in organising the day, again on 5 July, with fifty organisations reported to be supporting it. In 2020, the day will instead be held on 18 November, to mark the 60th anniversary of astronomer Frank Kameny's petition to the United States Supreme Court, in a case prompted by his dismissal from the US Army as a result of his sexual orientation.

=== Other events ===
Pride in STEM has marched as part of Pride in London's march in 2016, 2017, 2018 and 2019.

== Recognition ==
In 2017, the organisation was nominated for the Barbara Burford Gay Times Honour for excellence in STEM.

The journal Nature announced its support for the organisation in 2019.
