= Julia Stewart =

Julia Stewart or Stuart may refer to:

- Julia Stewart (businesswoman) (born 1955), American businesswoman
- Julia Stewart (actress) (1862–1945), English stage actress
- Julia Stuart, English novelist and journalist
- Julia Stuart (c.1867–1949), English-born American actress of the silent film era; credits include Saved from the Titanic
