= Grossmont High School =

Public secondary school in El Cajon, California, United States

Coordinates: 32°46′48.72″N 116°59′6.97″W

- Student Support Services Building, dedicated December 2016

Location
- 1100 Murray Drive; El Cajon, California; United States

Information
- Type: Public comprehensive secondary
- Established: 1920
- School district: Grossmont Union High School District
- Principal: Douglas Martin
- Grades: 9–12
- Enrollment: 2,079 (2023–2024)
- Campus: Urban
- Colors: Gold and blue
- Accreditation: Western Association of Schools and Colleges (WASC)
- Yearbook: El Recuerdo
- Nickname: Foothillers
- Website: Grossmont High School

Grossmont High School is a public high school in eastern San Diego County, California. Opened in 1920, it is the oldest public high school in East County and the first of twelve high schools currently in Grossmont Union High School District. The school has an approximate enrollment of 2,800 students.

Grossmont High School has been accredited by the Western Association of Schools and Colleges (WASC) since 1962. It was recognized as being a California Distinguished School for the scholastic year of 2008–2009.

The school's mascot is the Foothiller, so chosen because, at the time of the school's construction, East County was much more isolated from the rest of San Diego than it is today and was often referred to as the boondocks or the foothills.

== Campus ==
The school's "Old Main" building was constructed in 1922 and was used for decades as a teaching space before being converted to district offices. The campus has slowly expanded over the past 80+ years to include thirteen additional permanent instructional, athletic, and administrative buildings. Notable among these is the “Old Gym” which was built in the 1930s by the Civilian Conservation Corps. Recent plans to demolish this gymnasium were tabled after considerable negative community response.

Grossmont is directly in between the cities of La Mesa and El Cajon, with a large majority of students being from both areas; its official address lies within the city limits of El Cajon. It is located adjacent to regional Harry Griffen Park.

=== School museum ===
In 2008, the Grossmont High School Museum opened in the old book room storage room in the Math Building. It has since moved to a larger space on the east side of campus. The museum features a "Hall of Honor" highlighting notable staff, educators, and school alumni.

In 2025, the Grossmont High School Museum unveiled an outdoor mural featuring three alumni who went on to become astronauts: Bill Anders (Class of 1951), Rick Sturckow (Class of 1978), and Ellen Ochoa (Class of 1975)

== Extracurricular activities ==
=== Athletics ===
Grossmont's athletic teams, the Foothillers, compete in the Hills League of the Grossmont Conference and the CIF San Diego Section

The school fields teams in the following sports: baseball, boys basketball, cheer, girls basketball, boys cross country, girls cross country, football, boys golf, girls golf, gymnastics, boys lacrosse, girls lacrosse, boys soccer, girls soccer, softball, boys swimming & diving, girls swimming & diving, boys tennis, girls tennis, boys track & field, girls track & field, boys volleyball, girls volleyball, boys water polo, girls water polo, and wrestling.

Grossmont's varsity baseball team has captured the division II CIF title in the past 4 seasons ('05, '06, '07, '08) and ranks amongst the most competitive high schools in California.

== Traditions ==
=== Commencement ===
Commencement at Grossmont used to take place atop nearby Mt. Helix in an amphitheater constructed in the early part of the 20th century for Easter sunrise services. Graduation ceremonies were later moved to San Diego State University, and then to Grossmont's own Thomas Mullen Adams Stadium (Adams was the first American military officer killed during the Iraq War and a 1993 graduate). Awards granted each year at commencement include the Circle G Award, the Boy and Girl of the Year Award, and the Norman Freeman Award.

== Notable alumni ==
- Clark Allen, 1942, entertainer, artist, and businessman.
- Ryan Anthony, trumpet player
- Kimberlin Brown, actress
- Doug Benson, 1981, comedian
- Gregory R. Bryant, 1968, Rear Admiral, United States Navy
- Vinny Curran, actor Resolution
- Jack Hamann, 1972, journalist, CNN, PBS, author "On American Soil"
- Douglas Inman,1936, was a professor of Oceanography at the Scripps Institution of Oceanography.
- Jimmy LaValle, 1996, musician, The Album Leaf.
- Daniel Lewis, 1942, conductor
- David Leisure, 1968, actor, Empty Nest and fictional spokesman Joe Isuzu (Isuzu commercials)
- Jean Landis, 1936, aviator
- Beverly Long, 1950, actress Rebel Without A Cause
- Jenn Lindsay, singer-songwriter
- Scott Lippman,1973, director of Moores Cancer Center at the University of California, San Diego
- Dan McLain, aka Country Dick Montana, 1972, musician, entertainer (The Beat Farmers)
- Roger Neill, 1982, composer
- Mark M. Phillips, 1969, astronomer and cosmologist, Gruber Prize Laureate of 2007 for the discovery of dark energy and the Accelerating Universe
- Osmond J. Ritland, 1927, United States Air Force major general
- Julia Stewart, 1973, businesswoman
- Anna Prieto Sandoval, Chairwoman of the Sycuan Band of the Kumeyaay Nation
- William Kennedy Shearer, 1949, attorney, writer, and publisher of The California Statesman 1962–2007, founder of California's American Independent Party.
- L. Donald Shields, academic
- Julia A. Stewart, 1973, businesswoman, former Chief Executive of Dine Brands Global (IHOP and Applebee's).
- Michele Marsh,1972 journalist
- Ellamarie Packard Woolley, 1932, San Diego artist
- Frank Zappa, 1954, musician, composer
- James P. Zumwalt,1974, American diplomat

=== Astronauts ===
- William Anders, astronaut, Apollo 8, the first crew to fly to and orbit the Moon
- Ellen Ochoa, 1975, astronaut
- Frederick W. Sturckow, 1978, astronaut

=== Athletes ===
- Steven Brault, MLB pitcher, Pittsburgh Pirates
- Nick Christie, racewalker
- Kevin Correia, 1998, MLB pitcher, San Diego Padres
- Lance Dickson, 1987, baseball player
- Ralph Drollinger, 1972, UCLA basketball star, NBA player
- Dennis Enarson, 2009, pro BMX rider
- Geoff Geary, 1994, MLB pitcher, Philadelphia Phillies, Houston Astros
- A. J. Griffin, MLB pitcher, Texas Rangers
- Bud Held, javelin
- Joe Musgrove, MLB pitcher, San Diego Padres
- Mike McCoy, professional baseball utility player and coach
- Hal Norris, former National Football League defensive back for the Washington Redskins
- Alex Perelson, withdrew in 10th grade, skateboarder
- Jeff Van Raaphorst, 1982, quarterback Arizona State, 1987 Rose Bowl Player Of The Game
- Grant Roberts, Major League Baseball pitcher, New York Mets
- Kristin Rhodes, 1993, strength athlete
- Tommy Rutherford, basketball player
- Brian Sipe, 1967, former National Football League quarterback, 1980 MVP, Cleveland Browns and United States Football League (USFL) New Jersey Generals and Jacksonville Bulls
- Paul Wright, 1987, soccer player
- Barry Zito, Major League Baseball pitcher, Oakland Athletics and San Francisco Giants, 2002 Cy Young Award winner; attended Grossmont High School, University of San Diego High School

== See also ==
- List of high schools in San Diego County, California
