= Regina Santella =

American environmental scientist

Regina M. Santella
- Education: City University of New York; University of Massachusetts Amherst; Brooklyn College
- Scientific career
- Workplaces: Columbia University Mailman School of Public Health
- Thesis: Interaction of model proteins and DNA (1976)

Regina Maria (Padronaggio) Santella (born 1948) is an American environmental scientist who is an emeritus professor at the Columbia University Mailman School of Public Health. She used molecular epidemiology studies and laboratory assays to understand the role of environmental, lifestyle and occupational carcinogens in cancer development as well as to identify susceptible populations. She is the former Director of Columbia's NIEHS Center for Environmental Health in Northern Manhattan, Chair of the American Association for Cancer Research Molecular Epidemiology Working Group and Vice Dean of Faculty at Mailman.

== Early life and education ==
Santella was an undergraduate at Brooklyn College. She moved to the University of Massachusetts Amherst for graduate studies, where she specialized in organic chemistry. Her doctoral research, which she performed at the City University of New York, investigated the interaction of proteins with DNA.

== Research and career ==
Santella has studied how environmental chemicals primarily polycyclic aromatic hydrocarbons (PAH), ubiquitous pollutants, and aflatoxin, a dietary toxin produced by a mold, cause cancer. She has enabled precise carcinogen detection through highly specific and sensitive immunoassays. These assays use monoclonal and polyclonal antibodies developed by Santella to measure DNA and protein binding of the carcinogens to produce adducts as well metabolites of the carcinogens in urine. One of the first studies demonstrated that women who smoke had higher levels of PAH-DNA damage in their placental tissue than nonsmokers. Later studies revealed elevated DNA damage in people with environmental, occupational or lifestyle exposures. PAH exposure and breast cancer risk has been investigated in two projects, The Long Island Breast Cancer Study Project (LIBCSP), a population-based case-control study, and the Breast Cancer Family Registry (BCFR). In the LIBCSP, elevated PAH-DNA adducts in blood mononuclear cells was associated with increased breast cancer risk. In the BCFR, a prospective study design used blood samples collected from women who later went on to develop breast cancer as well as controls. Elevated PAH-albumin adducts were associated with increased breast cancer risk.

A long term collaboration with Dr. Chien-Jen Chen in Taiwan studied liver cancer using blood and urine specimens collected when participants in a cancer screening program were recruited. Samples from those who developed cancer during followup were assayed as well as samples from unaffected controls. These studies demonstrated that those with higher levels of aflatoxin-albumin adducts, PAH-albumin adducts and oxidative stress at recruitment had elevated risk for liver cancer. This population also was used in one of the first studies to demonstrate that blood biomarkers (plasma DNA methylation) could be used for early diagnosis of liver cancer.

Studies on genetic susceptibility to cancer used genotyping and phenotyping methods. Within the BCFR, she has shown that an individuals capacity to repair two types of DNA damage (bulky adducts such as PAH-DNA and double strand breaks impacts breast cancer risk. Other studies have evaluated how environmental and lifestyle factors influence epigenetic modifications (e.g., DNA methylation, telomere length and microRNA expression), and these play a role in cancer risk.

In 2023, Research.com named Santella as one of the top 1000 women scientists in the world.

== Selected publications ==
- Scott M. Lippman; Eric A. Klein; Phyllis J. Goodman; et al. (2009). "Effect of selenium and vitamin E on risk of prostate cancer and other cancers: the Selenium and Vitamin E Cancer Prevention Trial (SELECT)". JAMA. 301 (1): 39–51. doi:10.1001/jama.2008.864. PMC 3682779. PMID 19066370. Wikidata Q29619860.
- Kyriaki Michailidou; Beesley, Jonathan; Sara Lindstrom; et al. (2015). "Genome-wide association analysis of more than 120,000 individuals identifies 15 new susceptibility loci for breast cancer". Nature Genetics. 47 (4): 373–380. doi:10.1038/ng.3242. PMC 4549775. PMID 25751625. Wikidata Q35996692.
- Jiang W; Kahn SM; Zhou P; et al. (1993). "Overexpression of cyclin D1 in rat fibroblasts causes abnormalities in growth control, cell cycle progression and gene expression". Oncogene. 8 (12): 3447–3457. PMID 8247550. Wikidata Q53476711.
