= Amnesty International UK Media Awards 1999 =

The eighth annual awards were held at the British Academy of Film and Television Arts (BAFTA) on 24 June 1999. The awards were hosted by Moira Stuart.

The overall winner was BBC TV Panorama's "When Good Men Do Nothing", which covered the historical failures which had led to the situation in Rwanda and genocide.

David Bull, Director of Amnesty International UK, said: "Those working to defend human rights depend on the work of journalists whose dedication and determination help to expose injustice, torture and political killings. In a year that has seen continuing gross human rights violations around the world, including the unfolding tragedy of Kosovo, the role of the media in reporting these abuses of basic human rights has never been more vital".

The special award for human rights journalism under threat was awarded to Najam Sethi for his work as editor of the Pakistani national newspaper The Friday Times. He was unable to attend the awards as he had been arrested in Pakistan.

The awards also highlighted the work of Mark Thomas, which was not entered into the competition. Thomas used his series The Mark Thomas Comedy Product to attend Defendory, a trade show for the arms industry. He claimed to be offering PR training to governments and military regimes on how to present a better public image on human rights abuse. His services were sought by the governments of Kenya and Indonesia. Whilst offering these spoof services, Thomas and his assistants filmed Indonesian government officials admitting that the armed forces used torture. The reactions of government departments and arms manufacturers also featured.

Pierre Sané, AI's secretary general, addressed advances in human rights with the establishment of an International Criminal Court to try those responsible for war crimes and crimes against humanity, and in the arrest of General Pinochet. He also pointed to ongoing issues when he said, "But the reports from Kosovo, from the death cells of the USA, and from Sierra Leone also remind us that it has been an appalling year."

The judges for all categories were Andy Blackmore, (Note: At the time of the 1999 Awards, Andy Blackmore was picture editor at The Independent) Romesh Gunesekera, Krishnan Guru-Murthy, Mark Lattimer, (Note: At the time of the 1999 Awards, Mark Lattimer was Communications Director at Amnesty International UK) Jenni Murray, Geoffrey Robertson QC and Mary Ann Sieghart.

== Shortlist and Awards 1999 ==
1999
Category	Title	Organisation	Journalists	Refs
National Print
National Print	'In Diana's footsteps'	The Observer	John Sweeney	
National Print	series 'Kosovo: Human rights ignored'	The Guardian	Jonathan Steele	
National Print	Series on death row in the USA	Daily Mirror	Anton Antonowicz	
National Print	Sudan article	Daily Express	Ros Wynne-Jones	
Periodicals
Periodicals	'Human Rights Law Survey'	The Economist	David Manasian	
Periodicals	Judgement Day	The Mail on Sunday Review	Julia Stuart	
Periodicals	'Scarred by Hate'	Marie Claire	Emma Brooker	
Periodicals	'The Lost Boys'	Granta	Anna Pyasetskaya; Heidi Bradner	
Photojournalism
Photojournalism	Suffering in Kosovo	The Guardian and Observer	Andrew Testa	
Photojournalism	'The War the West Forgot'	The Independent Magazine	Dean Chapman	
Photojournalism	'Two Funerals in Kosovo'	The Independent on Sunday	David Rose	
Radio
Radio	'Arrest General Pinochet	BBC Radio 4's The World Tonight	presented by Robin Lustig	
Radio	Civilian	BBC Radio 4: From our Own Correspondent	reported by Jeremy Vine	
Radio	'The Choice'	BBC Radio 4	Lim Guan Eng & Tim Parr, presented by Michael Buerk,	
Special Award for Human Rights Journalism; Under Threat
Special Award for Human Rights Journalism; Under Threat	Najam Sethi (Urdu: نجم سیٹھی); He was unable to receive his award in person, as he was prevented from boarding a plane in Lahore en route to London. A former prisoner of conscience, Najam Sethi is editor of the Pakistani national newspaper The Friday Times. In May 1999, Najam was arrested, badly beaten, and held in solitary confinement for three weeks. He was released on 2 June 1992. His arrest followed a BBC team investigating corruption in Pakistan.			
Television; Documentary
Television; Documentary	'Mission Impossible'	Channel 4: Dispatches	produced by Clark Productions	
Television; Documentary	The Valley	Channel 4	produced by Mentorn Barraclough Carey	
Television; Documentary	When good men do nothing	BBC TV: Panorama	get list from BFI or BBC Webs	
Television; News; Overall Winner
Television; News; Overall Winner	Burma: The Opposition	BBC News	Sue Lloyd-Roberts	
Television; News; Overall Winner	Malaysia	Channel 4 News	Ian Williams	
Television; News; Overall Winner	Sierra Leone	BBC News	Fergal Keane	
Television; News; Overall Winner	War crimes in Kosovo	BBC Newsnight	Mark Urban	
