= Pejman Salimpour =

American physician

Dr. Pejman Salimpour
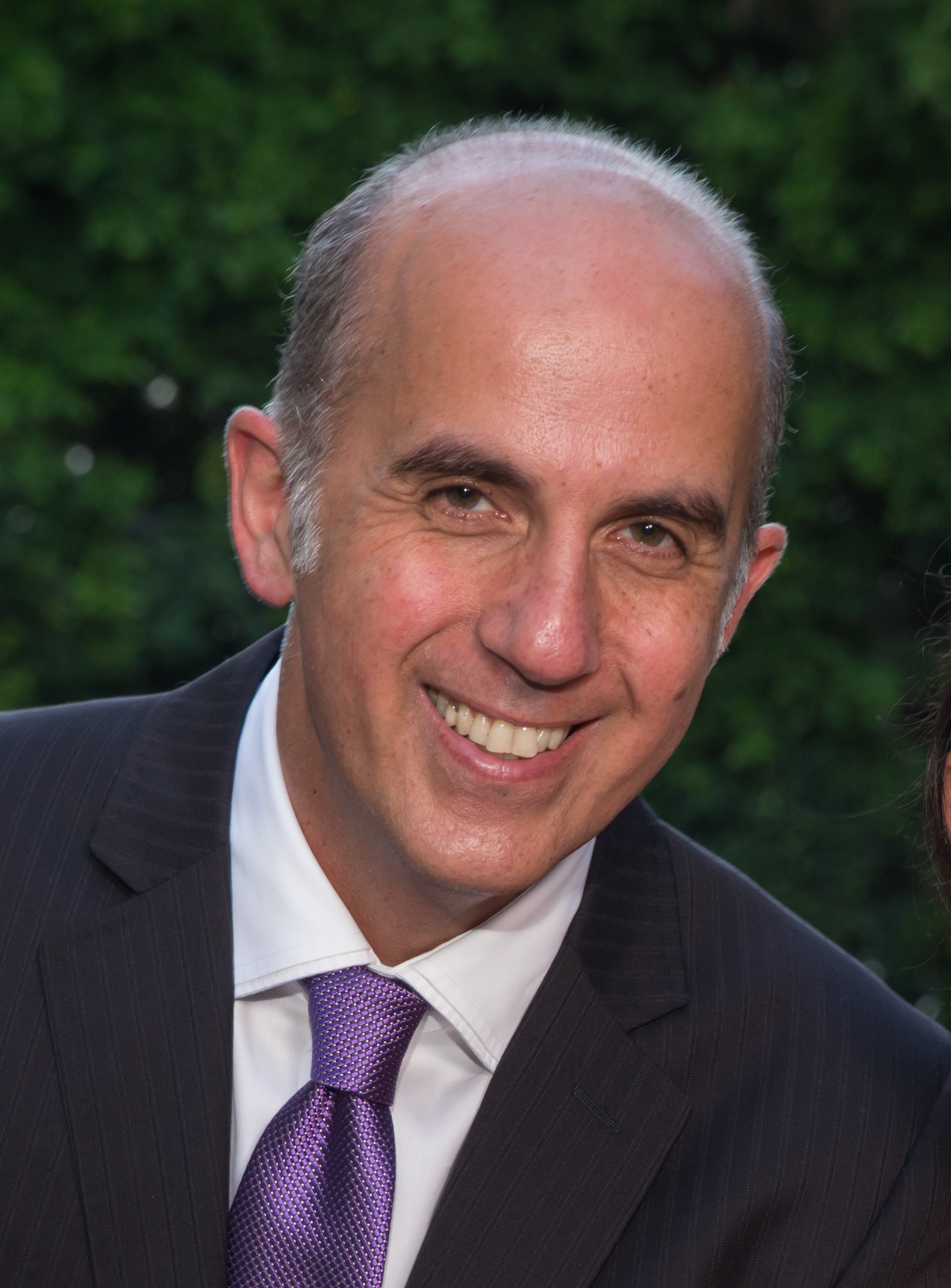
- Salimpour on 15 November 2014
- Born: Pejman Salimpour; London, England
- Education: UCLA; Washington University School of Medicine
- Occupations: Physician, Business Executive, Professor
- Spouse: Daphna Salimpour

Pejman Salimpour is an American physician, healthcare executive and former chief of pediatrics at Cedars-Sinai Medical Center in Los Angeles. He co-founded CareNex Health Services and Plymouth Health.

== Early life and education ==
Salimpour was born in England and grew up in Tehran, Iran, along with his two sisters and a younger brother, Pedram Salimpour. His father was a pediatrician, and his family lived in a Persian-Jewish community during the Iranian Revolution in the late 1970s. Salimpour immigrated to Philadelphia at the age of 17 and lived with an uncle who had previously immigrated to the United States. Salimpour learned English on his own by studying at a library in the evenings; he read English-language books and translated them into Persian using a dictionary to look up unfamiliar words.

Salimpour's family settled in Los Angeles six months after his arrival. His father joined the staff at Cedars-Sinai Medical Center before establishing a private pediatric practice.

In 1983, Salimpour graduated from the University of California, Los Angeles, with a bachelor's degree in chemistry. In 1987, he received his medical degree from Washington University School of Medicine. In 1990, he completed his residency at Harbor–UCLA Medical Center .

== Career ==
Salimpour has worked as a physician, professor, business executive, and owner of medical facilities. Additionally, he previously held the position of chief of pediatrics at Cedars-Sinai Medical Center in Los Angeles. He works part-time at the Salimpour Pediatric Medical Group, an organization founded by his father.

In the mid-1990s, Salimpour led an initiative that opposed exclusivity contracts between hospitals and physicians. These agreements prevented competing physicians from treating patients at certain hospitals. After a two-year campaign that included lobbying efforts and an antitrust lawsuit, hospitals receiving state funding were required to allow Neonatologists to see patients regardless of an exclusivity agreement.

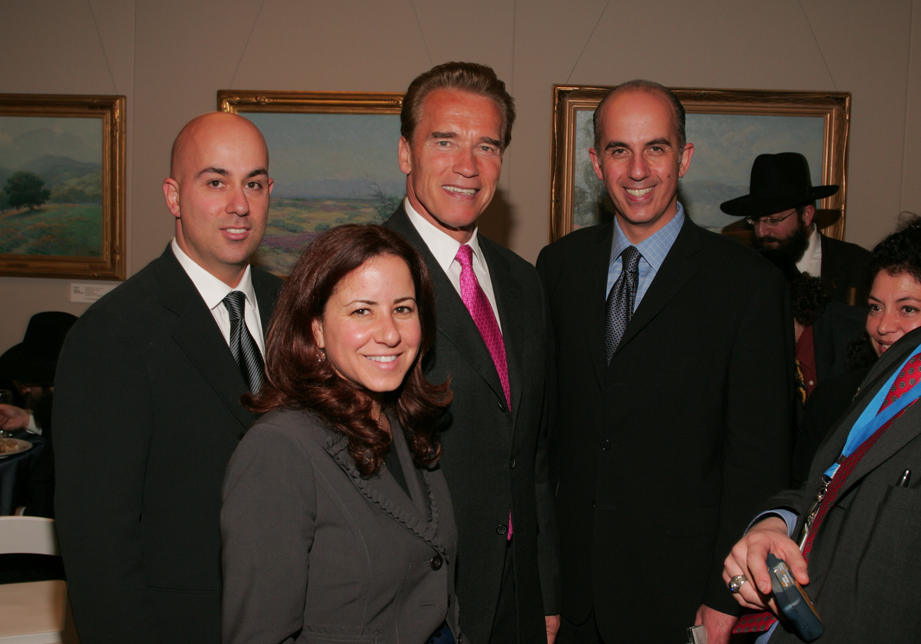
Salimpour with former California Governor Arnold Schwarzenegger

He co-founded two medical companies and co-owned one of San Diego's largest hospitals. He and his brother Pedram co-founded the company CareNex Health Services in 2005, which specializes in neonatal and perinatal disease management. The brothers also co-founded the physician-owned company Plymouth Health, formed specifically to acquire Alvarado Hospital Medical Center in San Diego, California. Salimpour and his company completed the purchase in 2007, paying approximately $36.5 million. He sold the hospital to Prime Healthcare Services in 2010.

Salimpour received a White House appointment to the National Latino Healthcare Task Force and the United States Small Business Administration National Advisory Council in 2005. He was also elected to the board of directors of the American Academy of Pediatrics (California Chapter) and the Los Angeles County Medical Association.

Salimpour is a professor of clinical pediatrics at the University of California, Los Angeles, School of Medicine. With his brother Pedram and his father, Ralph Salimpour, he co-authored Photographic Atlas of Pediatric Disorders and Diagnosis.

== Awards and recognition ==
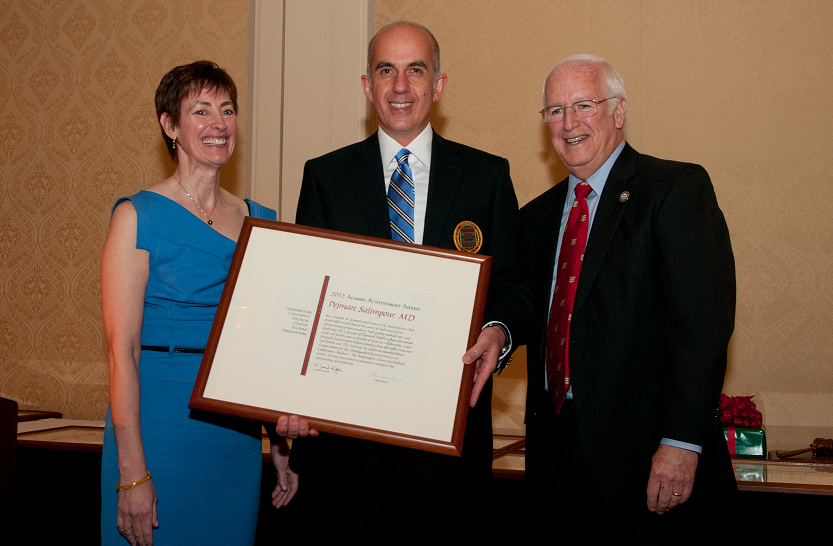
Salimpour receiving Washington University Award in April 2012.

Salimpour received a Distinguished Record of Service Commendation from California Governor Gray Davis for his work with children in the State of California. In 2012, he was given an Alumni Achievement Award by the Washington University School of Medicine and in 2014, he was listed as one of Hollywood's Top Doctors by The Hollywood Reporter.

== Personal life ==
Salimpour is the co-founder of NexCare Collaborative, a 501(c)(3) organization that helps find affordable health insurance for poor families in the Los Angeles area. It also provides free referrals to medical services for foster children. Also known as First 5 LA Connect, which provides a help line with bilingual staff who assist those needing affordable health care or referrals.

Salimpour is married to Daphna Salimpour, an architect and interior designer, and has three daughters.
