= David A. Cheresh =

American biologist

David Cheresh is a Michigan-born scientist who studies angiogenesis and cancer metastasis. His early research focused on the function of integrins, cellular receptors for the extracellular matrix, in cell migration and survival. His current work is on signaling aspects of cell invasion by vascular cells and tumor cells, with a focus on preventing tumor metastasis.

Cheresh received a PhD in Immunology from the University of Miami in 1982. In 1983, he moved to California to train with Ralph Reisfeld at The Scripps Research Institute in La Jolla, where he was later appointed assistant professor. In April 2005, Cheresh joined the Department of Pathology in the school of medicine at the University of California, San Diego, and moved his laboratory to the Moores Cancer Center. Cheresh is a recipient of an NIH MERIT award.

As of 2019, Cheresh is a distinguished professor and vice chair of research in the Department of Pathology in the School of Medicine at the University of California, San Diego.

== Publications ==
- Desgrosellier, J.S., Barnes, L.A., Shields, D.J., Huang, M., Lau, S.K., Prévost, N., Tarin, D., Shattil, S.J. and Cheresh, D.A. Integrin αvβ3/c-src “Oncogenic Unit” Promotes Anchorage-independence and Tumor Progression. 'Nature Medicine' Sept. 6, 2009.
- Greenberg, J.I., Shields, D.J., Barillas, S.G., Acevedo, L.M., Murphy, E., Huang, J., Scheppke, E., Stockmann, C., Johnson, R.S., Angle, N. and Cheresh, D.A. A role for VEGF as a negative regulator of pericyte function and vessel maturation. 'Nature' 456: 809–813, 2008.
- Stockmann, C., Doedens, A., Weidemann, A., Zhang, N., Takeda, N., Greenberg, J.I., Cheresh, D.A. and Johnson, R.S. Deletion of vascular endothelial growth factor in myeloid cells accelerates tumorigenesis. 'Nature' 456: 814–819, 2008.
- Murphy, E.A., Majeti, B.K., Barnes L., Makale, M., Weis, S.M., Wrasidlo, W., and Cheresh, D.A. Nanoparticle-mediated drug delivery to tumor vasculature suppresses metastasis. 'Proc. Natl. Acad. Sci.' 105: 9343–9348, 2008.
- Stupack, D., Teitz, T., Potter, M., Mikolon, D., Kidd, V.J., Lahti, J.M., Cheresh, D.A. Potentiation of neuroblastoma metastasis by loss of caspase 8. 'Nature' 439:95-99, 2006.
- Alavi, A., Hood, J.D., Frausto, R., Stupack, D.G. & Cheresh, D.A. Role of Raf in vascular protection from distinct apoptotic stimuli. 'Science' 301:94-96, 2003.
- Eliceiri, B.P., Paul, R., Schwartzberg, P.L., Hood, J.D., Leng, J. and Cheresh, D.A. Selective requirement for Src kinases during VEGF-induced angiogenesis and vascular permeability. 'Molecular Cell' 4:915-924. 1999.
- Friedlander, M., Brooks, P.C., Shaffer, R.W., Kincaid, C.M., Varner, J.A., and Cheresh, D.A. Definition of two angiogenic pathways by distinct αv integrins. 'Science' 270:1500-1502, 1995
- Brooks, P.C., Montgomery, A.M.P., Rosenfeld, M., Reisfeld, R.A., Hu, T., Klier, G. and Cheresh, D.A. Integrin αvß3 antagonists promote tumor regression by inducing apoptosis of angiogenic blood vessels. 'Cell' 79:1157-1164, 1994.
