= John Alksne =

American academic (1933–2024)

John Fergus Alksne (October 20, 1933 – May 17, 2024) was an American academic who was Professor Emeritus of Neurosurgery and Dean of the UC San Diego School of Medicine.

== Early life ==
Alksne was born in San Jose, California on October 20, 1933. He graduated from Palo Alto High School in 1951.

== Career ==
Alksne obtained his medical degree at the University of Washington School of Medicine.

After spending one year at the Anatomical Institute in Oslo, Norway, Alksne served as the Chief of Neurosurgery at Harbor General Hospital at UCLA from 1964 to 1967. He then served as the Professor and Chair of Neurological Surgery at The Medical College of Virginia from 1967 to 1971.

Alksne moved to San Diego in 1971. At the University of California, San Diego, Alksne would serve as:

- Professor of Surgery, Division of Neurological Surgery, UCSD School of Medicine
- Founding Chief, Division of Neurological Surgery, UCSD School of Medicine
- Vice Chancellor for Health Sciences, UCSD School of Medicine
- Dean, UCSD School of Medicine

As the Dean of the School of Medicine and the Vice Chancellor of Health Sciences, Alksne oversaw both the School of Medicine and the university's two hospitals. Alksne also founded the Epilepsy Surgery Program at UCSD and would later receive an award from the Epilepsy Society of San Diego.

In 1993, Alksne performed the first surgery at the then-new John M. and Sally B. Thornton Hospital and Perlman Ambulatory Care Center at UCSD.

He was appointed Dean of the UCSD School of Medicine in 1992, was appointed Vice Chancellor for Health Sciences in 1994, and served as Chief of Neurological Surgery at UCSD until 1995.

== Professional organizations ==
- American Association of Neurological Surgeons
- The Latin American Federal of Neurosurgeons
- The World Society of Stereotactic and Functional Neurosurgery
- The Association of American Medical Colleges
- The Association of Academic Health Centers

Alksne was the Program Chairman for The Society of Neurological Surgeons meeting in Rochester, Minnesota and hosted the society's 1993 meeting in San Diego.

== Personal life and death ==
Alksne was active in the San Diego cultural and philanthropic community, and was a key figure in the creation of the John M. and Sally B. Thornton Hospital and Perlman Ambulatory Care Center.

Alksne died on May 17, 2024, at the age of 90.
