= Jacobs Medical Center at UC San Diego Health =

Teaching hospital in San Diego, California

Jacobs Medical Center
- UC San Diego Health

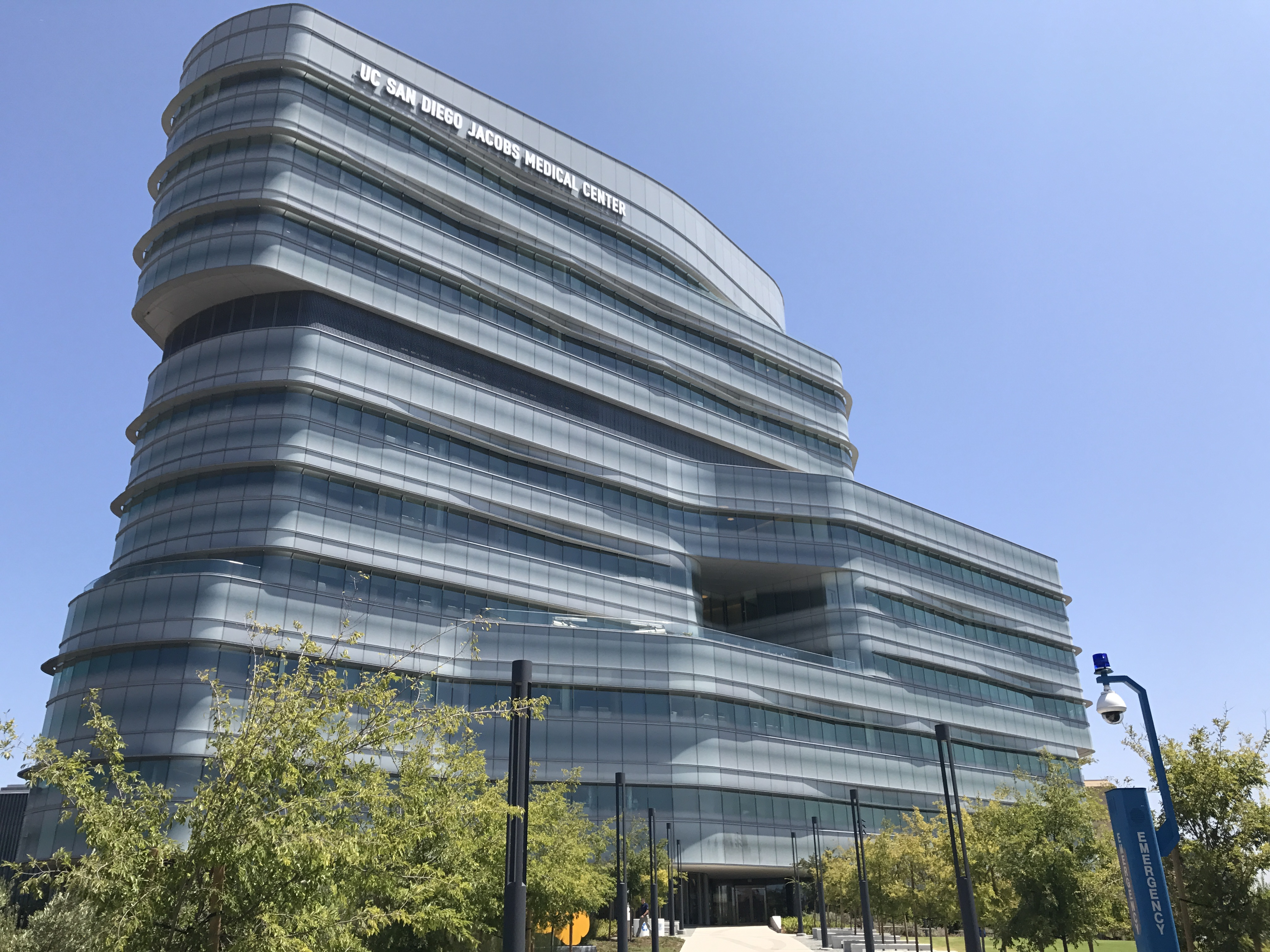

Geography
- Location: La Jolla, San Diego, California, United States
- Coordinates: 32.877703°N 117.226499°W

Organization
- Care system: Private
- Type: Teaching
- Affiliated university: University of California, San Diego

Services
- Beds: 364

Helipads
- Helipad: Yes

History
- Founded: 2016

Links
- Website: healthlocations.ucsd.edu/la-jolla/9300-campus-point-drive
- Lists: Hospitals in California

Jacobs Medical Center is a teaching hospital of UC San Diego Health at the University of California, San Diego. The facility was opened in 2016.

Jacobs Medical Center comprises three specialty pavilions. The A. Vassiliadis Family Pavilion for Advanced Surgery occupies floors two and three. Floors four through six are reserved for the Pauline and Stanley Foster Pavilion for Cancer Care, and the eighth through tenth floors are occupied by the Rady Pavilion for Women and Infants. Jacobs Medical Center and the existing Thornton Pavilion share a first, second and third floor and are connected to Sulpizio Cardiovascular Center, the Perlman Medical Offices, and the Altman Clinical and Translational Research Institute building via footbridges.

== Planning and construction ==
In 2005, the University of California, San Diego, announced plans to shift all its operations at its aging Hillcrest hospital to a new facility in La Jolla, adjacent to Thornton Hospital on the eastern half of its main campus. This announcement was met with heavy pushback from lawmakers, rival medical providers, and patient advocates who argued that the move would leave South Bay communities underserved and other local hospitals overwhelmed. On May 18, 2007, the UC Regents approved a plan to build an additional 125 to 150-bed inpatient tower in La Jolla. The approval was paired with a UC San Diego commitment to continue providing care in Hillcrest beyond the year 2030.

The university broke ground on the new inpatient tower on April 9, 2012. At the time, the hospital was expected to cost $664 million and had been named Jacobs Medical Center in honor of Irwin and Joan Jacobs donating $75 million toward its construction (they would go on to donate another $25 million). Over the next few years, construction costs continued to grow as health system officials decided to add a specialized surgical suite, operating rooms, an anatomic pathology lab, a cardiac rehabilitation program, a discharge pharmacy, and nursing administrative space. Additionally, it was determined that multiple floors which were originally planned as empty space would open with the rest of the hospital. The finished 509,500 sq ft, 245-bed tower cost more than $940 million and opened in November 2016. CannonDesign was the architect, Kitchell Contractors, Inc. was the general contractor.

== Pavilions ==
=== Thornton Pavilion ===
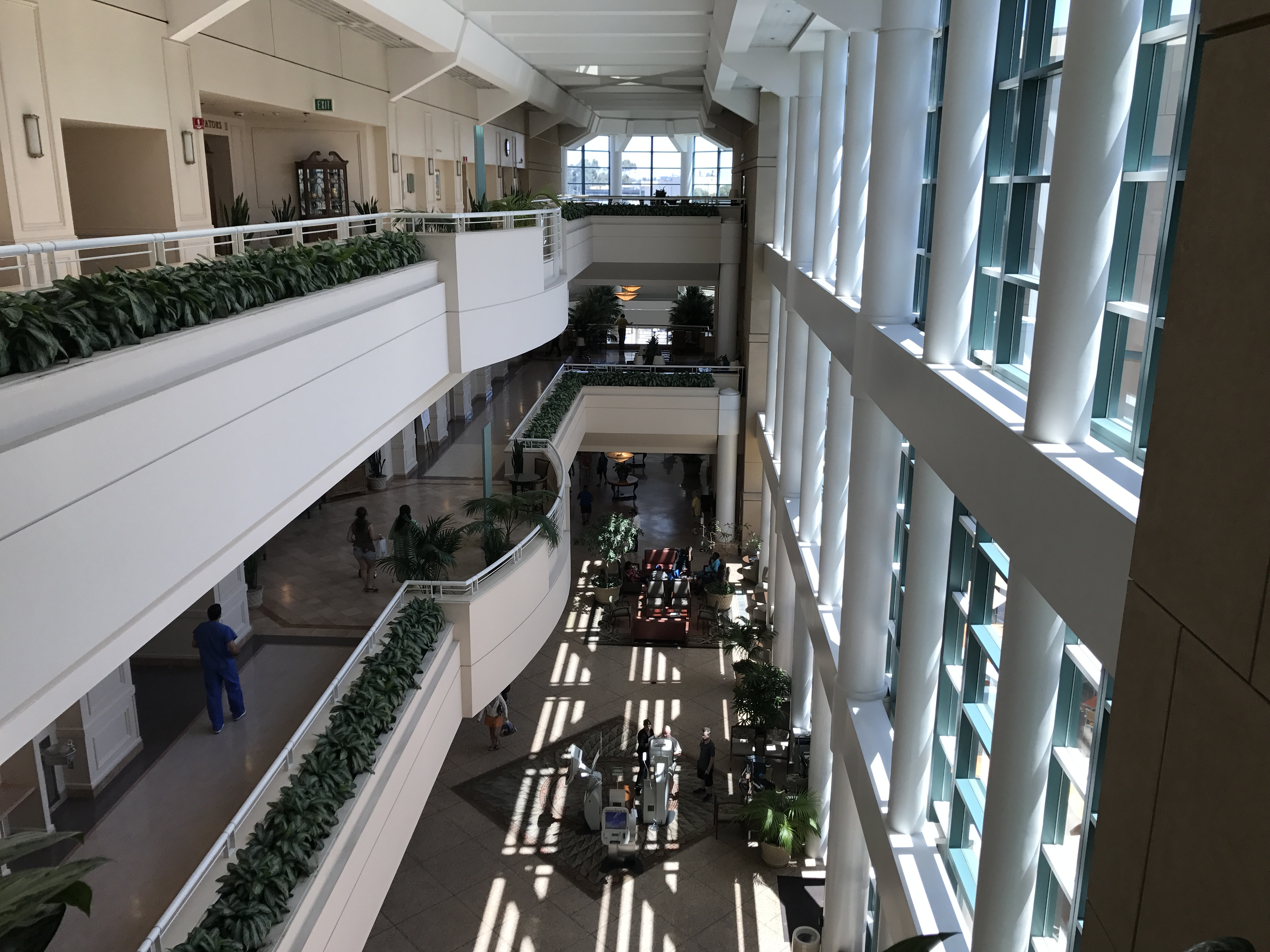
Thornton Pavilion atrium

Thornton Hospital opened in 1993 as a standalone general medical-surgical hospital with 119 beds and a full range of specialties. The construction of Jacobs Medical Center was originally intended as a simple expansion of the hospital, but evolved into the ten-story quaternary care facility that exists today. In 2016, the hospital was consolidated into the Jacobs Medical Center complex as its own pavilion. It shares a first, second and third floor with the new inpatient tower and a first and second floor with the Perlman Medical Offices outpatient clinic, and continues to offer services such as surgery and radiology.

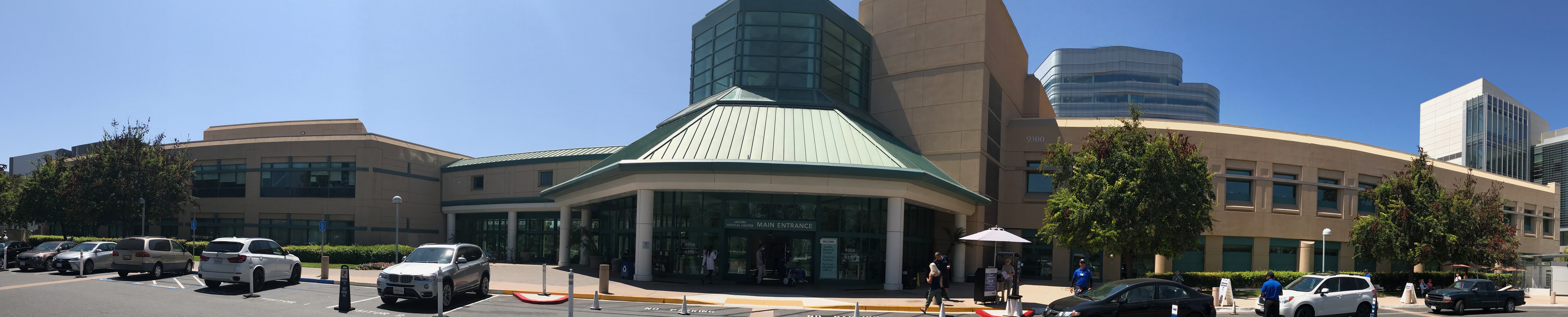
Thornton Pavilion entrance to Jacobs Medical Center

=== Vassiliadis Pavilion ===
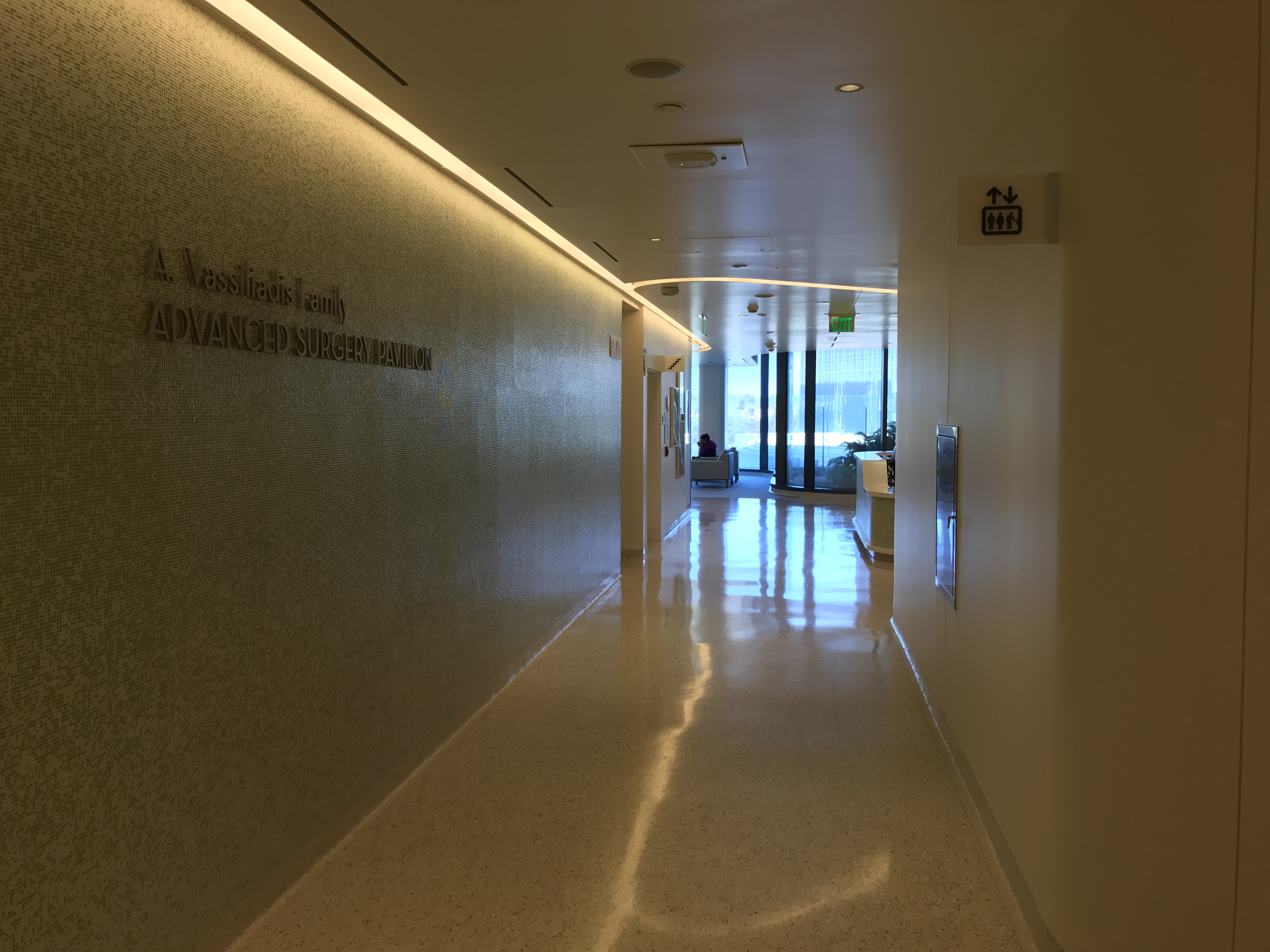
Entrance to the Vassiliadis Pavilion

The A. Vassiliadis Pavilion for Advanced Surgery has 14 operating rooms of 650 sq ft each. It occupies the second and third floors of the medical center and is named for Carol Vassiliadis' $8.5 million gift on behalf of her deceased husband Alkiviadis. The pavilion is staffed by 200 surgeons and provides technology to perform surgeries not possible elsewhere in the county. These include minimally invasive surgeries to treat cancer and obesity; microsurgeries to restore voice, hearing, and facial function; MRI-guided gene therapy for brain cancer; heated intraperitoneal chemotherapy for abdominal cancer; spine and joint reconstruction; and robotic surgery for several cancers. The technologies at work include the region's only four intraoperative MRI machines, which allow real-time imaging of tumors and gene therapies during surgery to ensure complete treatment, as well as the nation's only Restriction Spectrum Imaging technology, which color code brain fibers to better plan for complex surgeries in advance. The area also includes three Intensive Care Units with 36 private rooms.

=== Foster Pavilion ===
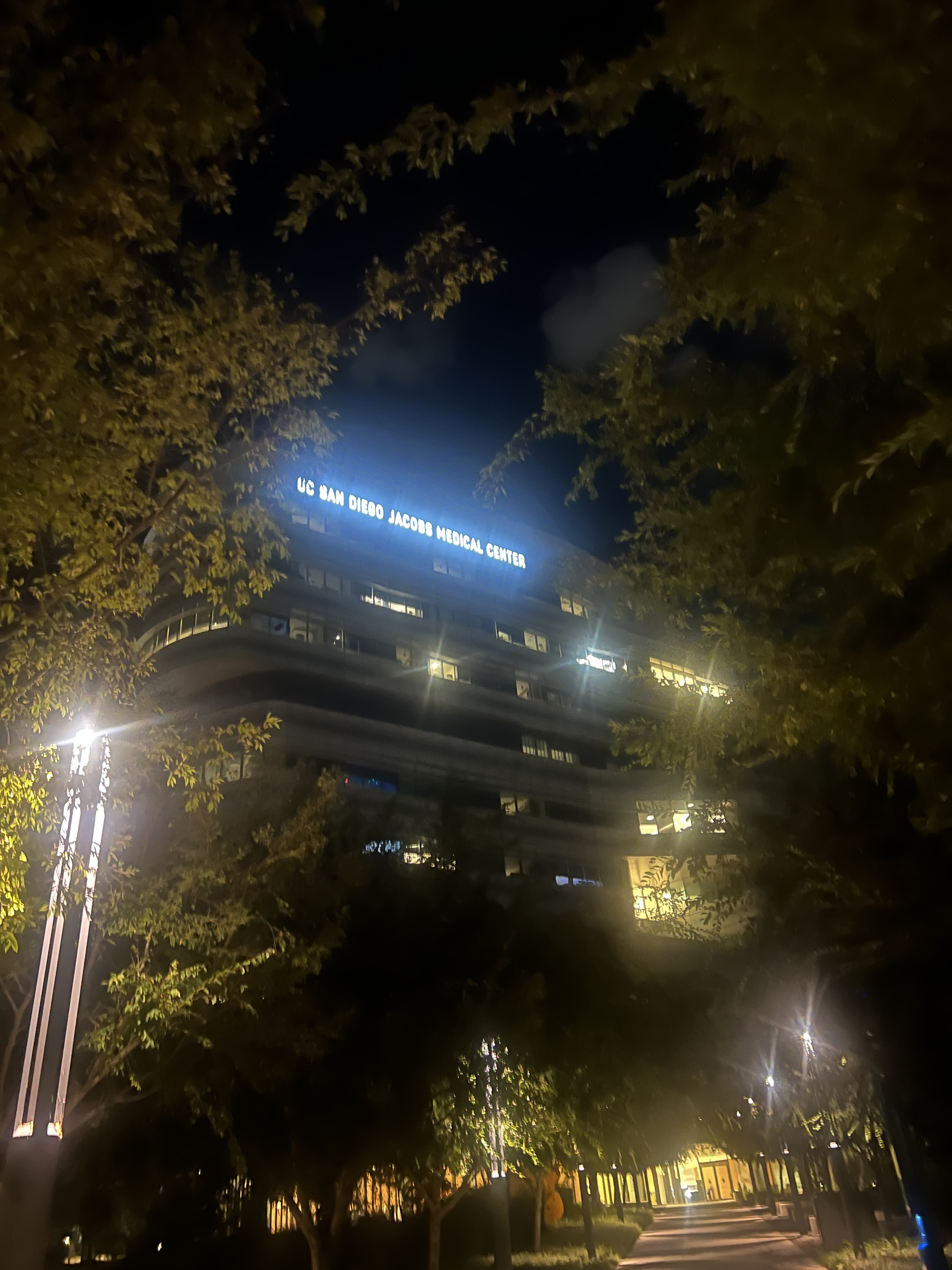
Jacobs Medical Center at Night

The Pauline and Stanley Foster Pavilion for Cancer Care is a 108-bed facility affiliated with Moores Cancer Center and dedicated to the treatment of advanced cancers. It is the only dedicated inpatient cancer hospital in San Diego. The pavilion occupies the fourth, fifth, and sixth floors of Jacobs Medical Center and is named for a $7.5 million gift from Pauline Foster. Patients will have access to over 100 cancer subspecialists working at Moores Cancer Center. The sixth floor of the hospital, jointly operated with Sharp HealthCare, is the only open floor in California with full-unit air filtration, allowing blood and marrow transplant patients and those undergoing chemotherapy to socialize and roam throughout the floor. Procedures such as laser ablation of brain tumors are handled downstairs in the Vassiliadis Pavilion.

=== Rady Pavilion ===
The Rady Pavilion for Women and Infants includes eight labor rooms, 32 postpartum rooms, three operating suites for cesarean sections and a three-room midwife center. It occupies the eighth, ninth, and tenth floors of the hospital and is named for a $12 million gift from Evelyn and Ernest Rady, whose names are also on the UC San Diego School of Management and San Diego's Children's Hospital. The pavilion includes a Level III Neonatal Intensive Care Unit to monitor and care for severely premature or ill infants. Pregnant women and new mothers also have access to non-invasive fetal genetic testing, wireless fetal heart rate monitoring during labor, fertility preservation, and preeclampsia detection and treatment. The hospital has views of UC San Diego, the Torrey Pines Mesa, La Jolla and the Pacific Ocean.
