= Moores Cancer Center =

Rebecca and John Moores Cancer Center
- UC San Diego Health

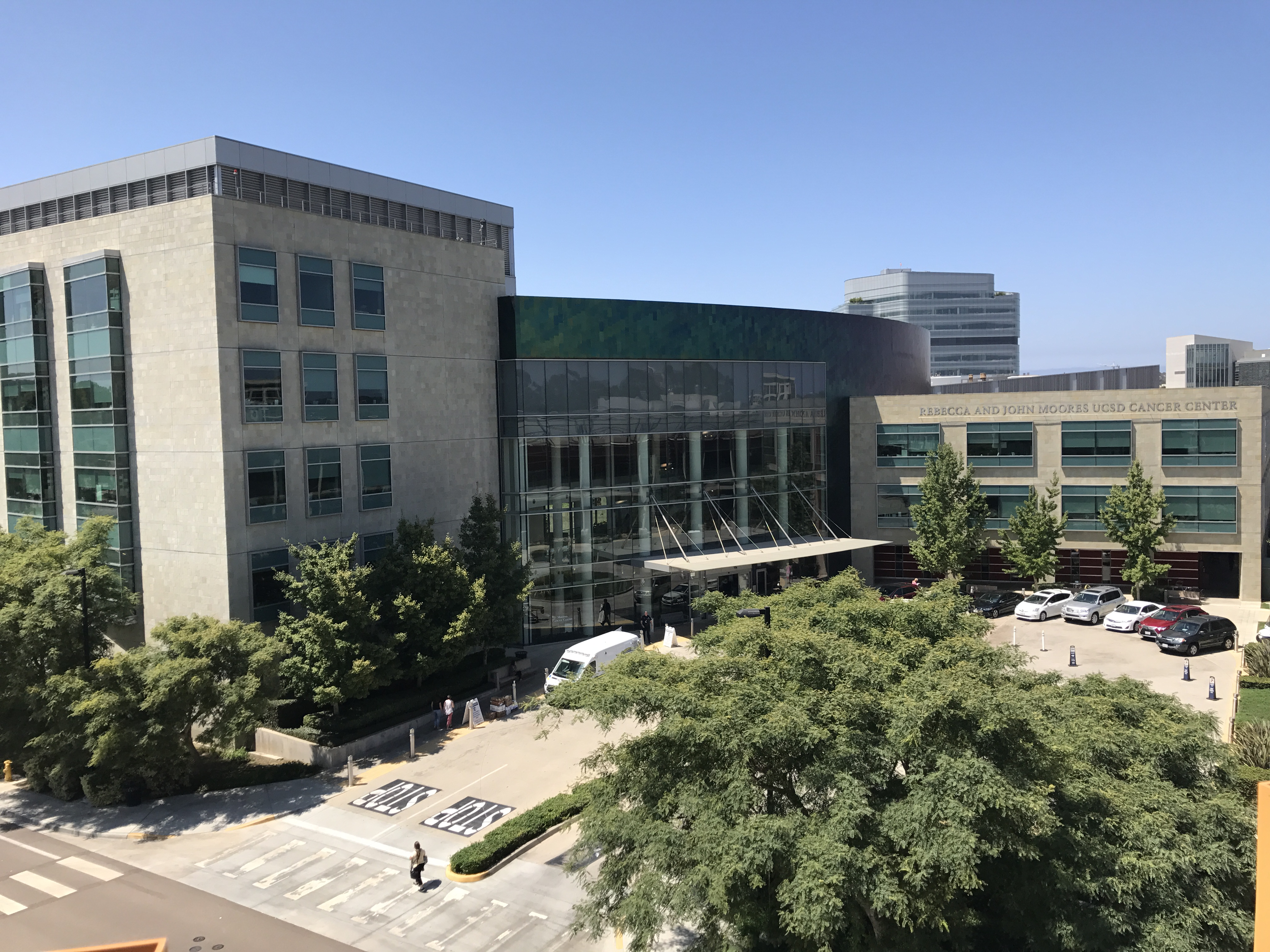

Geography
- Location: La Jolla, San Diego, California, United States
- Coordinates: 32.878863°N 117.223111°W

Organization
- Type: Teaching
- Affiliated university: University of California San Diego

Services
- Emergency department: Yes (Sulpizio Cardiovascular Center)
- Specialty: Oncology

History
- Founded: 1978

Links
- Website: health.ucsd.edu/specialties/cancer/Pages/default.aspx
- Lists: Hospitals in California

The Rebecca and John Moores Cancer Center is the region's only NCI-designated Comprehensive Cancer Center, part of UC San Diego Health and affiliated with the University of California, San Diego. It is supported, in part, by the National Cancer Institute.

== History ==
The center was established in 1978 and received its NCI designation the same year. It earned comprehensive status in 2001. There are approximately 360 faculty members affiliated with the center.

A five-story building, home to the center, was opened in La Jolla in 2005.

The Moores Cancer Center provides outpatient treatment on site. Inpatient hospital treatment is provided at the adjacent Jacobs Medical Center in the Pauline and Stanley Foster Pavilion for Cancer Care, which opened in 2016 and has three floors dedicated to oncology, and at UC San Diego Medical Center in Hillcrest, which has recently expanded its cancer services.

Scott Lippman served as the director from 2012 until 2021. He previously worked at MD Anderson Cancer Center.

Lippman was succeeded by Joseph Califano who served in the role from 2022 until early 2023.

The six major research programs at Moores Cancer Center comprise the following: Cancer Biology; Cancer Genes and Genome; Cancer Prevention and Control; Hematologic Malignancies; Reducing Cancer Disparities; and Tumor Growth, Invasion, and Metastasis.

== Notable faculty ==
- Roger Tsien
- Thomas Kipps, discoverer of ROR1, and contributed to the development of cirmtuzumab
- Don W. Cleveland
- Marilyn Farquhar
- Napoleone Ferrara
- Quyen T. Nguyen
