= Hal Norris =

American football player (born 1931)

No. 20
- Positions: Defensive back, linebacker

Personal information
- Born: November 4, 1931 (age 95); Baton Rouge, Louisiana, U.S.
- Listed height: 5 ft 11 in (1.80 m)
- Listed weight: 194 lb (88 kg)

Career information
- High school: Grossmont (El Cajon, California)
- College: California
- NFL draft: 1955: 16th round, 183rd overall pick

Career history
- Washington Redskins (1955–1956)

Career NFL statistics
- Games played: 13
- Stats at Pro Football Reference

Harold Norris (born November 4, 1931) is an American former professional football player who was a defensive back for the Washington Redskins of the National Football League (NFL). He played college football for the California Golden Bears and was selected in the 16th round of the 1955 NFL draft.
