= UC San Diego Health =

University-operated medical system in San Diego, California

- University of California, San Diego

Geography
- Location: San Diego, California

Services
- Emergency department: Level I trauma center
- Beds: 1,101

Helipads
- Helipad: Yes

History
- Founded: 1966

Links
- Website: health.ucsd.edu

UC San Diego Health is the public hospital system of the University of California, San Diego in San Diego, California. It is part of the larger umbrella UC San Diego Health Sciences, which also includes the university's three professional schools in medicine, pharmacy, and public health.

In operation since 1966, the healthcare system comprises three major hospitals: Hillcrest Medical Center, Jacobs Medical Center, and East Campus Medical Center. The La Jolla campus also includes the Moores Cancer Center, Shiley Eye Institute, Sulpizio Cardiovascular Center, and Koman Family Outpatient Pavilion, and the health system also includes several outpatient sites located throughout San Diego County.

It is the healthcare provider for athletic teams San Diego Padres and UC San Diego Tritons.

== Hospitals ==
=== Hillcrest Medical Center ===
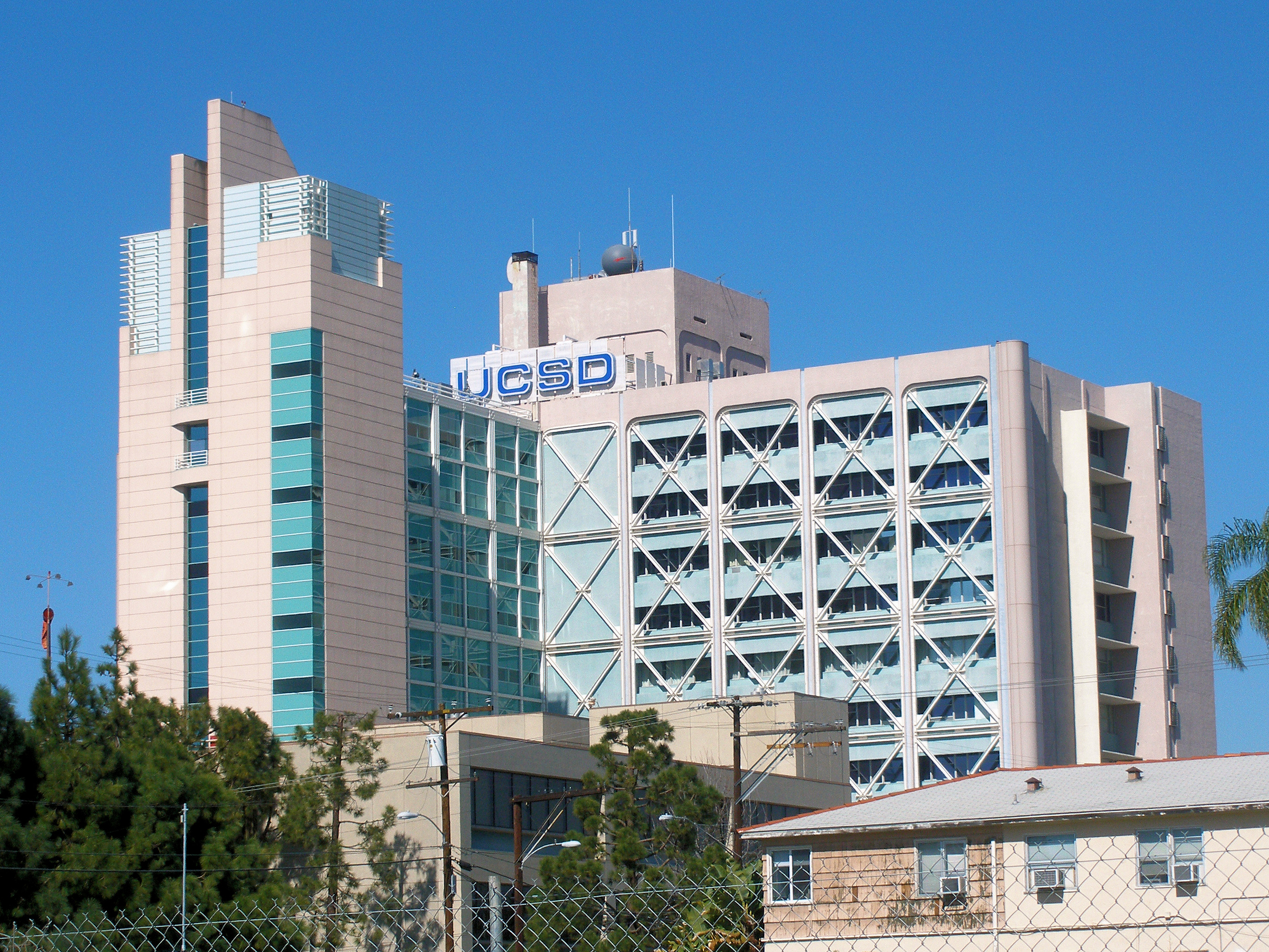
Hillcrest Medical Center at UC San Diego Health

Hillcrest Medical Center at UC San Diego Health is the first of three primary hospitals for the University of California, San Diego School of Medicine.

The region's first academic medical center offers both primary care and specialized services, including surgery, diagnosis and management of genetic disease, neurology, orthopedics, oncology, and the Sleep Medicine Center.

The 381-bed hospital at Hillcrest is home to the San Diego Regional Burn Center, San Diego County's only academic Level One Trauma Center, a Comprehensive Stroke Center, Poison Center, Hyperbaric Medicine Center, and the National Institutes of Health-designated Clinical Research Center. The Hillcrest campus also includes the Owen Clinic for HIV care to men, women and children.

=== Jacobs Medical Center ===
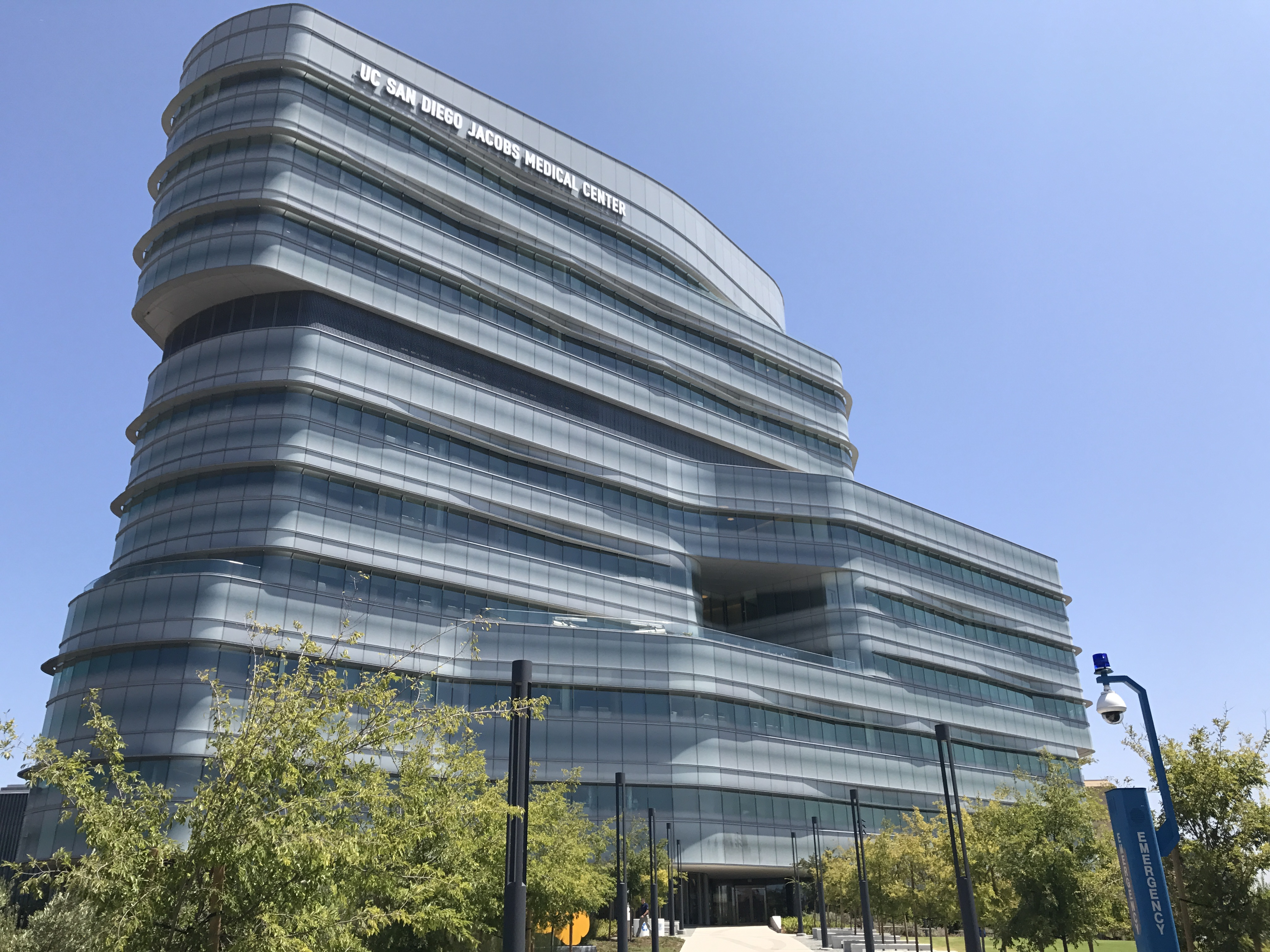
Jacobs Medical Center in La Jolla

Jacobs Medical Center opened on November 20, 2016. It is the second component of UC San Diego Health's two-campus strategy and provides specialized quaternary care not available elsewhere in San Diego County. The 364-bed advanced medical center is divided into four separate pavilions: Thornton Pavilion, Vassiliadis Pavilion (floors 2–3), Foster Pavilion (floors 4–6), and Rady Pavilion (floors 8–10). The A. Vassiliadis Family Pavilion for Advanced Surgery includes intraoperative MRI machines and the only Restrictive Spectrum Imaging facility in the United States. The Pauline and Stanley Foster Pavilion for Cancer Care houses a blood and marrow transplant program jointly operated by UC San Diego Health and Sharp Healthcare, the floor for which is completely pressurized and filtered allowing patients to roam freely. The Rady Pavilion for Women and Infants includes a Level III Neonatal Intensive Care Unit, eight labor rooms, 32 private postpartum rooms, and a three-room midwifery birth center. Each of the hospital's private rooms is equipped with an Apple iPad for controlling lighting, checking medical records, and contacting care providers. The facility is named for Joan and Irwin Jacobs in recognition of a $75 million gift they made to support its construction.

==== Thornton Pavilion ====
The John M. and Sally B. Thornton Pavilion and Perlman Medical Offices opened in the summer of 1993 as the standalone Thornton Hospital. John Alksne, a neurosurgeon and then-dean of the School of Medicine, performed the first surgery at this hospital. It was a delicate brain operation. It is located on the UC San Diego campus in San Diego, California. It is a 119-bed general medical-surgical facility that offers a full range of services, including surgery, cardiology, endocrinology, neurology, orthopedics, oncology, reproductive medicine, pulmonary medicine and physical therapy. In 2016, the hospital was consolidated into the Jacobs Medical Center hospital complex.

=== East Campus Medical Center ===
East Campus Medical Center at UC San Diego Health was purchased from Prime Healthcare Services on December 12, 2023. It aims to provide enhanced emergency care units, as well as access to a wider variety of behavioral health and psychiatry services.

== Specialty centers ==
=== Moores Cancer Center ===
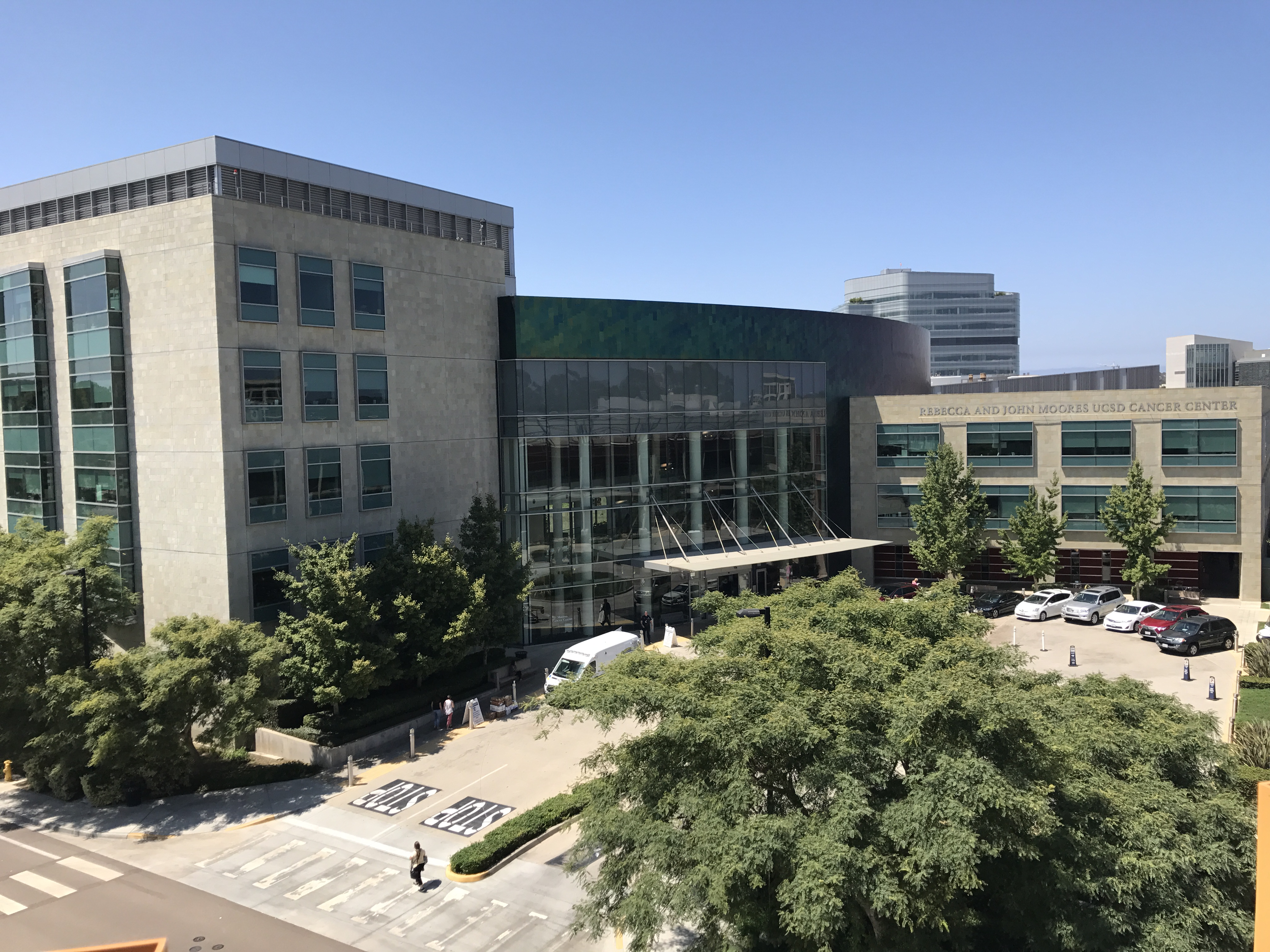
Moores Cancer Center in San Diego, California

Established in 1979, the Rebecca and John Moores UC San Diego Cancer Center is the region's only NCI-designated Cancer Center. It provides outpatient care for more than 200 cancer types and is a regional center for cancer research and clinical trials of the most promising cancer therapies.

=== Shiley Eye Institute ===
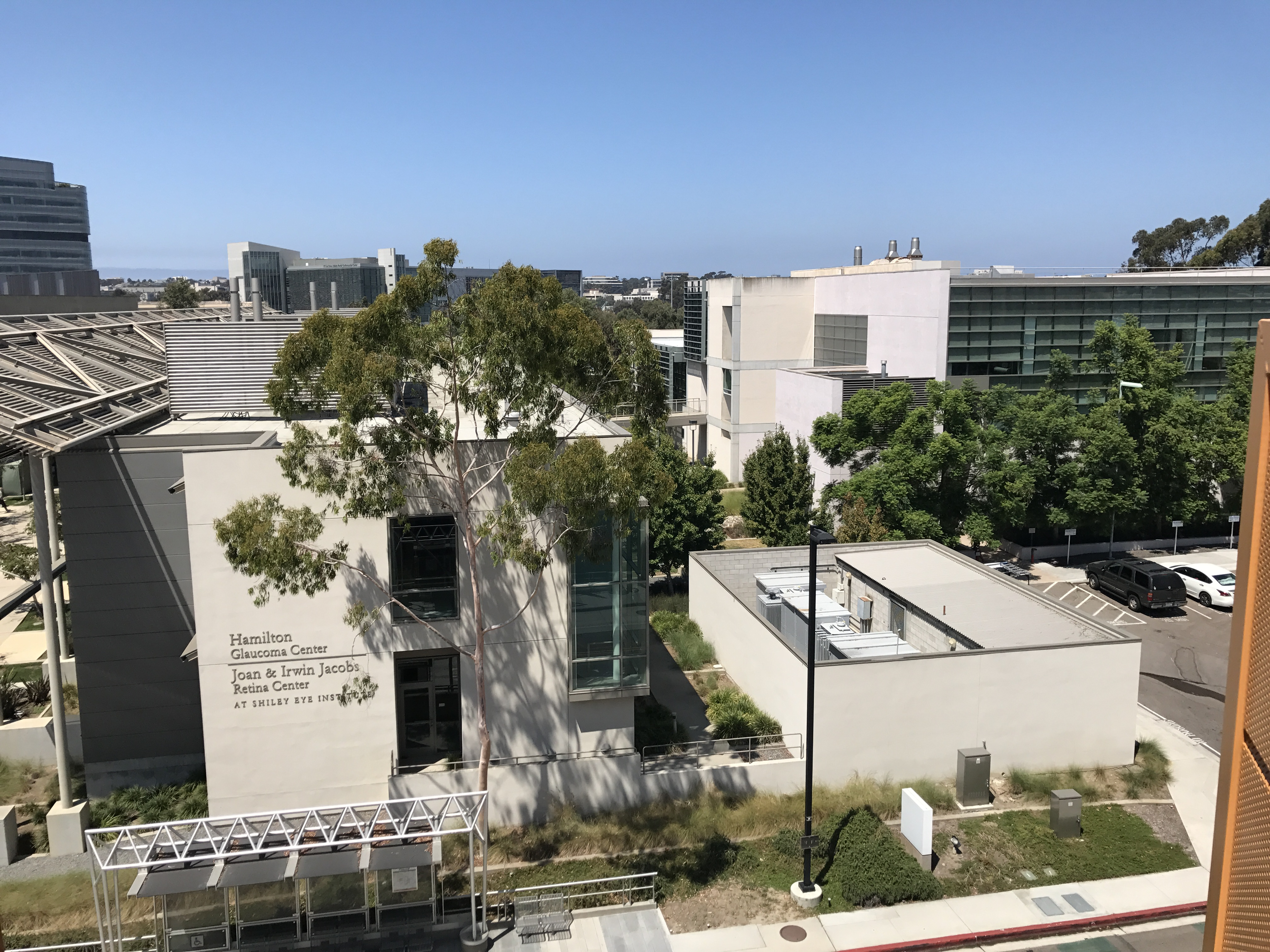
Shiley Eye Institute, Hamilton Glaucoma Center, and Jacobs Retina Center in La Jolla

UC San Diego Shiley Eye Institute provides comprehensive eye care services, from basic eye exams to advanced diagnostic tests and sophisticated surgery. Eye care services offered at Shiley Eye Institute include cataract surgery, cornea transplants, glaucoma diagnosis and treatment, low vision services, neuro-ophthalmology, optometry and contact lens service, pediatric ophthalmology, plastic surgery, refractive surgery, retina care, and trauma repair. It also houses the Joan and Irwin Jacobs Retina Center and Hamilton Glaucoma Center.

The Abraham Ratner Children's Eye Center is immediately adjacent to the Shiley building.

=== Sulpizio Cardiovascular Center ===
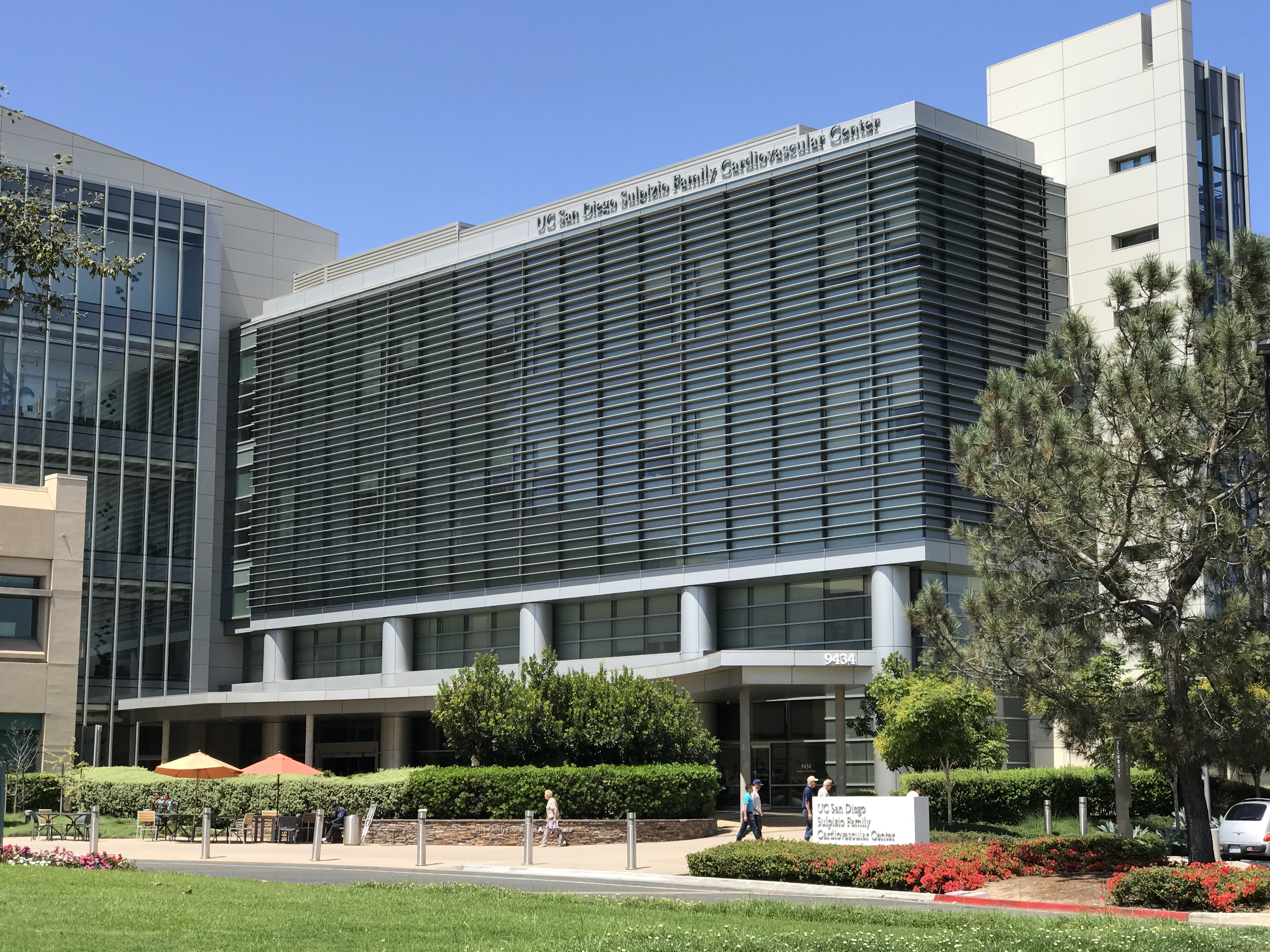
The Sulpizio Family Cardiovascular Center houses the Departments of Cardiology and Emergency Medicine in La Jolla

The Sulpizio Family Cardiovascular Center provides ambulatory, clinical, and inpatient heart and stroke care in one central location. Sulpizio Cardiovascular Center is the region's first academic-based facility to combine all heart and vascular-related services, programs and technology under one roof. It is connected by footbridges to Jacobs Medical Center and the Altman Clinical and Translational Research Institute, a 311,000 gross square feet, $269 million laboratory building. The emergency department for the La Jolla campus is housed in the Sulpizio building, with 22 outpatient beds and 54 acute care beds.

== Research ==
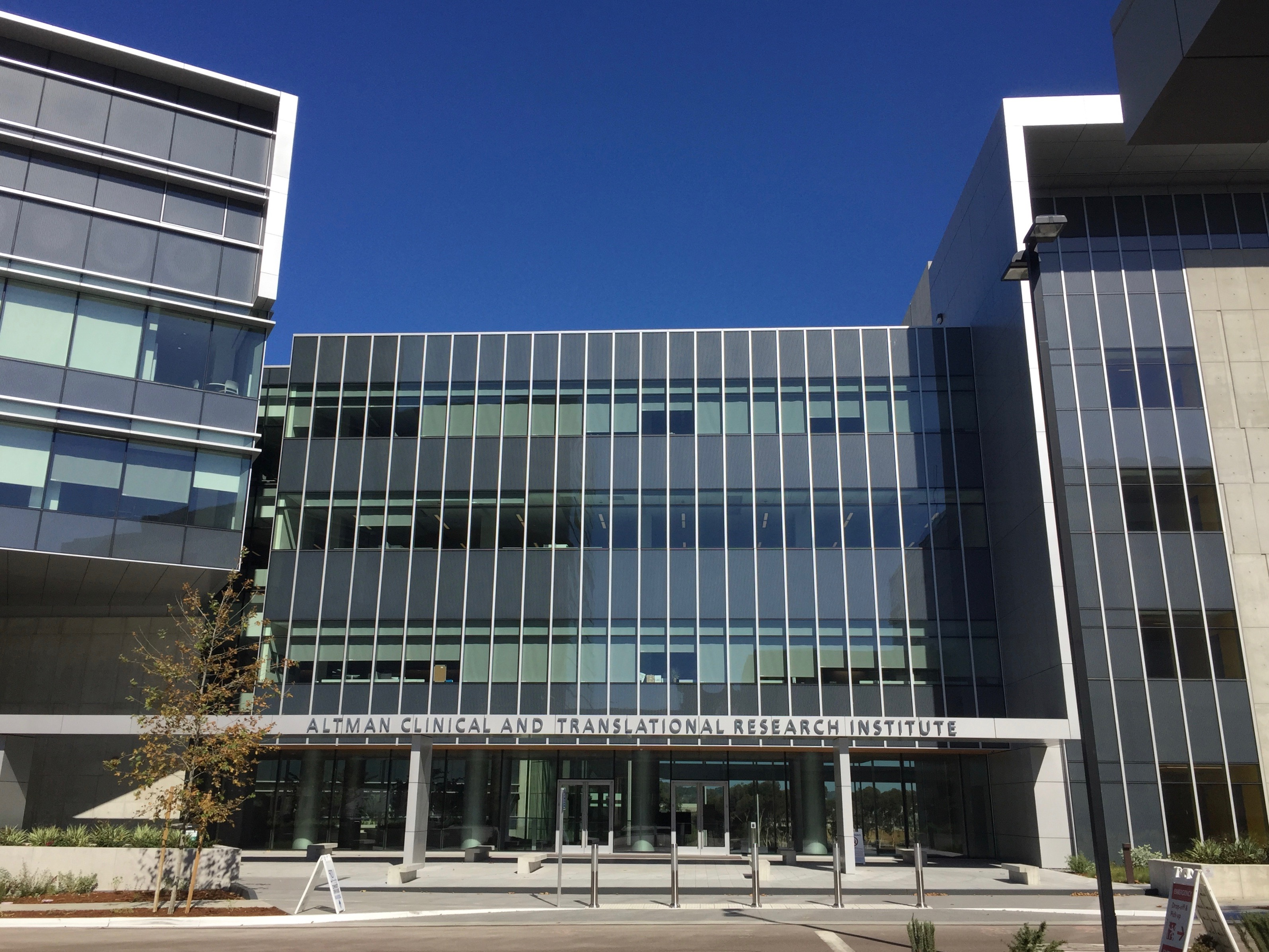
The Altman Clinical and Translational Research Institute building in La Jolla

UC San Diego is one of the most active health science research institutes in the country. Of the $1.2 billion it received in research funding in FY2018, $686 million was dedicated to health sciences research at UC San Diego Health medical centers and the School of Medicine. Several pioneering medical innovations have been made by UC San Diego researchers, such as the development of the chemotherapy drug cetuximab, the use of gene therapy in the treatment of congenital defects, the discovery of insulin resistance as a cause of diabetes, the understanding of genetic blood disorders such as sickle cell disease, the link between vitamin D deficiency and certain cancers, the first human trials of robotically assisted laparoscopic surgery, the development of the first oral drug for treating interstitial cystitis called Elmiron, the demonstration of HIV latency, the link between the p53 gene and rheumatoid arthritis, the identification of the genetic basis for familial cold autoinflammatory syndrome, the discovery of an early warning sign for autism, the connection between inflammation and cancer, the use of green fluorescent protein as a surgical and research aid, the nation's first sleeve gastrectomy, and the discovery of a potential treatment for chronic lymphomatic leukemia called Cirmtuzumab.

The health system coordinates its activities closely with the UC San Diego School of Medicine as well as the university as a whole. In particular, clinical and translational research are important for both entities to advance the quality of patient care. UC San Diego Health conducts several hundred clinical studies per year at its hospitals and clinics. In 2016, the university opened the Altman Clinical and Translational Research Institute (ACTRI) building, which brings together professors in medicine, chemistry, neuroscience, molecular biology, mechanical engineering, political science, bioengineering, computer science, and pharmacy to solve new and complex medical questions. The ACTRI also enables collaboration with the Jacobs School of Engineering, the Salk Institute for Biological Studies, Sanford Burnham Prebys, La Jolla Institute for Immunology, the J. Craig Venter Institute, and San Diego State University. Its building is connected by a footbridge to Sulpizio Cardiovascular Center and the Jacobs Medical Center complex. In addition to this, UC San Diego Health Sciences (the body which oversees both the hospital and school of medicine) runs the following research centers:

- AIDS Research Institute
- AntiViral Research Center
- Autism Research Center
- Center for Academic Research and Training in Anthropogeny
- Center for AIDS Research, Center for Community Health
- Center for Drug Discovery Innovation
- Center for Healthy Aging
- Center for Translational Imaging and Precision Medicine
- Center of Excellence in Nanomedicine
- Center on Gender Equity and Health
- CLL Research Consortium
- Glycobiology Research and Training Center
- HIV Neurobehavioral Research Program
- Institute for Diabetes and Metabolic Health
- Institute for Genomic Medicine
- Larsson-Rosenquist Foundation Mother-Milk-Infant Center of Research Excellence
- Ludwig Institute for Cancer Research – San Diego
- Movement Disorder Center
- Psychopharmacology Research Initiatives Center of Excellence
- Shiley-Marcos Alzheimer's Disease Research Center
- William K. Warren Medical Research Center for Celiac Disease

== Regional affiliations ==
UC San Diego Health shares doctors and care providers with two other hospital systems in the region. In 2015, it entered a long-term management agreement with El Centro Regional Medical Center in El Centro, the county seat of Imperial Valley. Under the terms of this agreement, ECRMC patients have access to specialized facilities operated by UC San Diego Health in the city. Doctors also have access to training and continuing medical education through UC San Diego School of Medicine, and UC administrators will continually monitor the operational needs of the remote medical center. UC San Diego Health participates in a similar program with the Tri-City Medical Center community hospital in Oceanside. The partnership is expected to help Tri-City improve patient outcomes and reduce its readmission rate.

Research affiliations of the health system include external physicians and researchers connected through the aforementioned Altman Clinical and Translational Research Institute. In addition, UC San Diego scientists are affiliated with the CIRM-funded Sanford Consortium. The Sanford Consortium is a stem cell research partnership between UC San Diego, the Salk Institute for Biological Studies, Scripps Research, La Jolla Institute for Immunology, Takeda Pharmaceutical and Sanford Burnham Prebys. It is housed in a building adjacent to Salk, UC San Diego, and Torrey Pines Gliderport and performs basic and preclinical stem cell and regenerative medicine research.

Non-medical affiliations of the health system include the San Diego Padres and the San Diego Metropolitan Transit System. In 2015, UC San Diego Health spent $30 million for a 30-year naming rights deal to the Blue Line operated by San Diego Trolley, Inc. The deal changed the line's name to the UC San Diego Blue Line and granted UC San Diego the right to wrap three trolleys with advertising. It resulted in the renaming of two trolley stations: the Voigt Drive station opened as UC San Diego Health La Jolla station, and the Pepper Canyon station was renamed to UC San Diego Central Campus station.

== Clinics ==
UC San Diego Health operates outpatient clinics throughout San Diego County. There are multiple locations in La Jolla, Hillcrest and Encinitas. It also has clinics in downtown San Diego, Chula Vista, Kearny Mesa, Sorrento Valley, Scripps Ranch, Rancho Bernardo, Vista, Eastlake, and Temecula.

== New facility and planned expansions ==
In 2018, UC San Diego Health opened the new 156,000-square-foot Koman Family Outpatient Pavilion in La Jolla. The facility includes eight surgery suites, basic and advanced imaging, physical therapy and pain management, as well as infusion and apheresis services. Additionally, long-range plans are underway to modernize and expand UC San Diego Medical Center in Hillcrest. The Hillcrest hospital will be completely renovated or replaced on the same site before 2030, when it will fail to meet seismic safety standards.

UC San Diego Health was also in the process of approving a joint powers agreement with Tri-City Medical Center in North County to add to their network of hospitals. It was expected to join UC San Diego Health's network sometime in 2024 if the Regents of the University of California approved the partnership. UC San Diego Health aimed to expand pregnancy & delivery programs, as well as gynecology for the hospital. The hospital was set to be renamed to UC San Diego Health – Tri-City if the partnership would have been approved. UC San Diego Health ultimately stopped negotiations after failing to reach an agreement with Tri-City
