= Receptor tyrosine kinase-like orphan receptor =

Identifiers
- Symbol: ROR
- InterPro: IPR016247
- Membranome: 720
Available protein structures:
- PDB: IPR016247
- AlphaFold: IPR016247

receptor tyrosine kinase-like orphan receptor 1

Identifiers
- Symbol: ROR1
- Alt. symbols: NTRKR1
- NCBI gene: 4919
- HGNC: 10256
- OMIM: 602336
- RefSeq: NM_005012
- UniProt: Q01973

Other data
- EC number: 2.7.10.1
- Locus: Chr. 1 p32-p31
Search for
- Structures: Swiss-model
- Domains: InterPro

receptor tyrosine kinase-like orphan receptor 2

Identifiers
- Symbol: ROR2
- Alt. symbols: NTRKR2, BDB, BDB1
- NCBI gene: 4920
- HGNC: 10257
- OMIM: 602337
- RefSeq: NM_004560
- UniProt: Q01974

Other data
- Locus: Chr. 9 q22
Search for
- Structures: Swiss-model
- Domains: InterPro

In the field of molecular biology, receptor tyrosine kinase-like orphan receptors (RORs) are a family of tyrosine kinase receptors that are important in regulating skeletal and neuronal development, cell migration and cell polarity. ROR proteins (ROR1 and ROR2 in humans) can modulate Wnt signaling by sequestering Wnt ligands.
