= Pedram Salimpour =

American physician

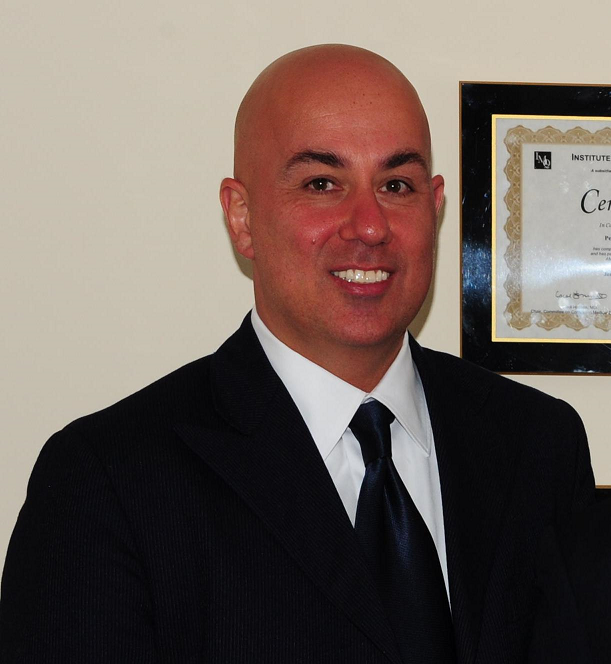
- Salimpour in 2015
- Born: Tehran, Iran
- Education: University of California, Riverside (BS); University of California, Los Angeles (MPS); Boston University School of Medicine
- Occupations: Physician; author; entrepreneur; professor
- Years active: 1990–present

Pedram Salimpour is an Iranian-American physician, author, and business executive. He co-founded CareNex Health Services (later acquired by Anthem), Champion Health Enterprises, and Plymouth Health, which previously owned Alvarado Hospital in San Diego. He has served on various professional boards and, in 2014, became president of the Los Angeles County Medical Association.

He is also a two-time recipient of the American College of Physicians' Research Award. He delivered the commencement address to the 2008 graduating class of the University of California, Riverside, and the keynote address at the annual colloquium of the Whitehead Institute at MIT in 2012.

== Early life and education ==
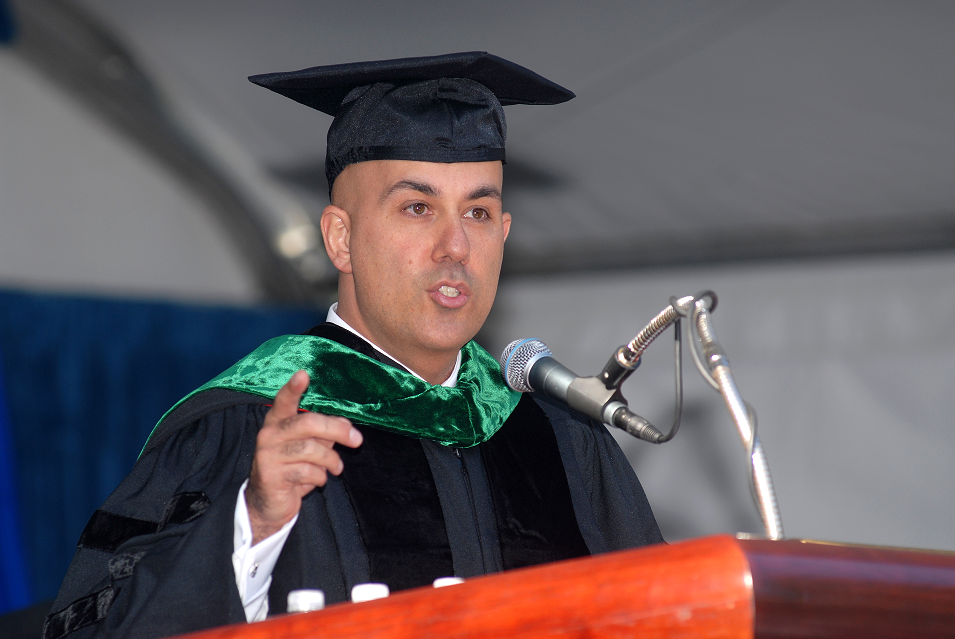
Salimpour giving a keynote speech at University of California, Riverside

Salimpour was born in Tehran, Iran, and immigrated to the United States with his family following the Iranian Revolution. He moved to Los Angeles at the age of 12, where his father later established a medical practice after working at Cedars-Sinai Medical Center.

In 1990, Salimpour earned a bachelor's degree in biology from the University of California, Riverside and a master's degree in public health (Health Services Administration) from UCLA in 1992. He received a medical degree from Boston University School of Medicine in 2000, where his research focused on the association between frequent bicycle riding and erectile dysfunction. He completed his residency at the Keck School of Medicine of the University of Southern California.

== Career ==
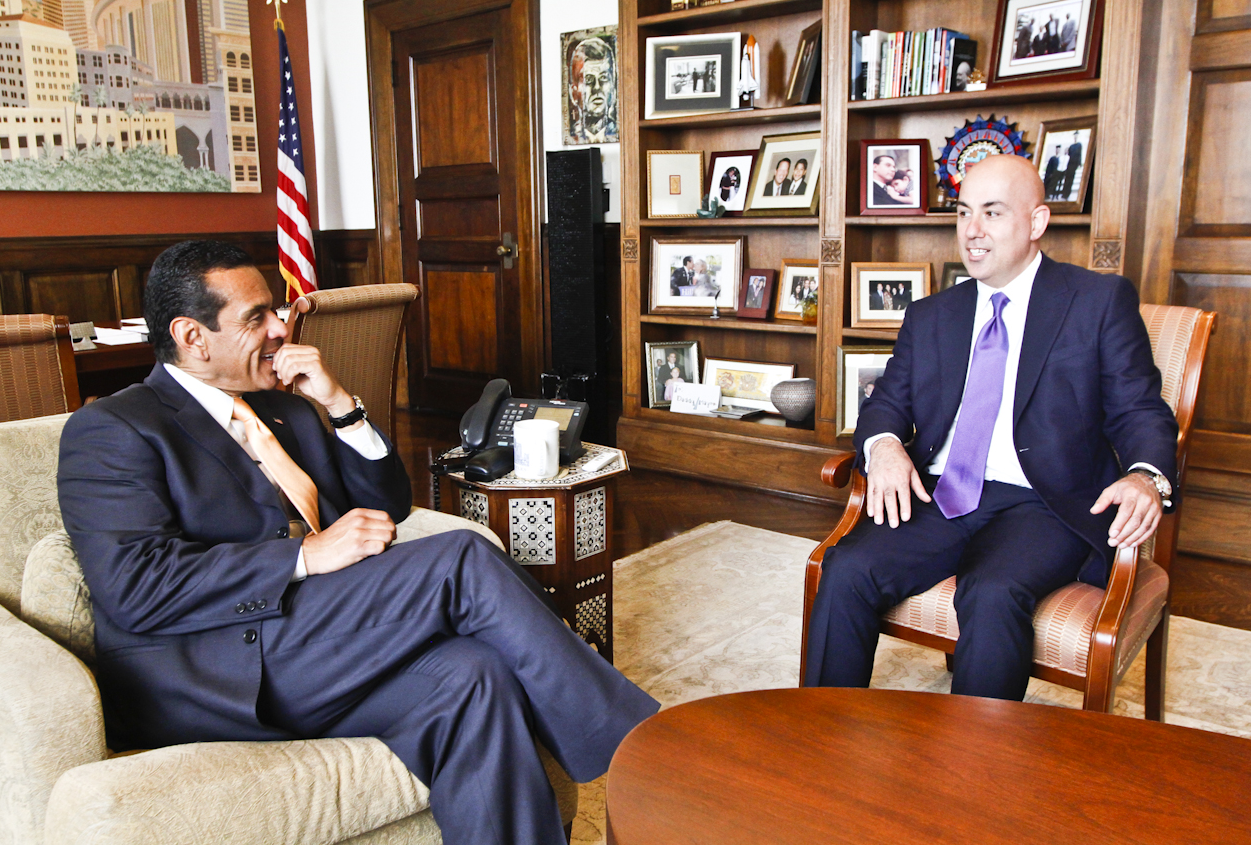
Salimpour with Los Angeles mayor Antonio Villaraigosa

In 2005, he and his brother, Pejman Salimpour, founded CareNex Health Services, a healthcare technology company specializing in neonatal and perinatal disease management. The company was acquired by WellPoint (now Elevance Health) in 2013. And in 2006, they co-founded Plymouth Health, which purchased Alvarado Hospital in San Diego from Tenet Healthcare. The sale occurred after Tenet agreed to resolve federal allegations involving physician kickbacks through a civil settlement that included the hospital’s divestiture and a $21 million payment. Plymouth Health acquired the hospital for approximately $36.5 million and later sold it to Prime Healthcare in 2010.

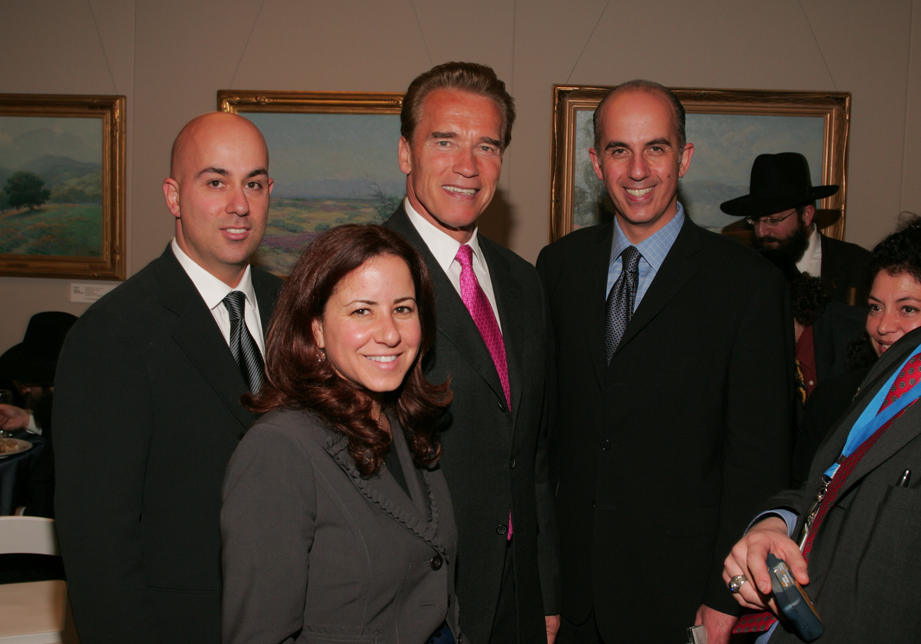
Dr. Pedram Salimpour (left) and brother Dr. Pejman Salimpour (right) with former California governor Arnold Schwarzenegger

Salimpour co-founded Champion Health Enterprises (now Pierce Health Solutions), a company providing healthcare services for Native American tribes and other business entities. He served as the company's CEO and has partnered with the Morongo Band of Mission Indians since the inception of Champion Health. In addition to his clinical and entrepreneurial work, Salimpour has published articles in medical journals, co-authored a pediatric atlas, and served in academic appointments. He wrote the Photographic Atlas of Pediatric Disorders and Diagnosis, a book that he co-authored with his brother Pejman and his father Ralph Salimpour. He holds the position of adjunct professor at the Center on Human Aging at San Diego State University and is an associate professor of pediatrics at the University of California, Riverside School of Medicine.

Salimpour is the founding chairman of the board of Directors of the Discovery Science Museum in Los Angeles.

Salimpour served as a commissioner on the Los Angeles Board of Fire and Police Pensions from 2013 to 2022. In 2021, the Los Angeles Police Protective League accused Salimpour of ethics violations in alleged lobbying for a contract to test unvaccinated city employees for COVID-19. Salimpour and the Los Angeles city personnel department denied the allegations.

== Recognition ==
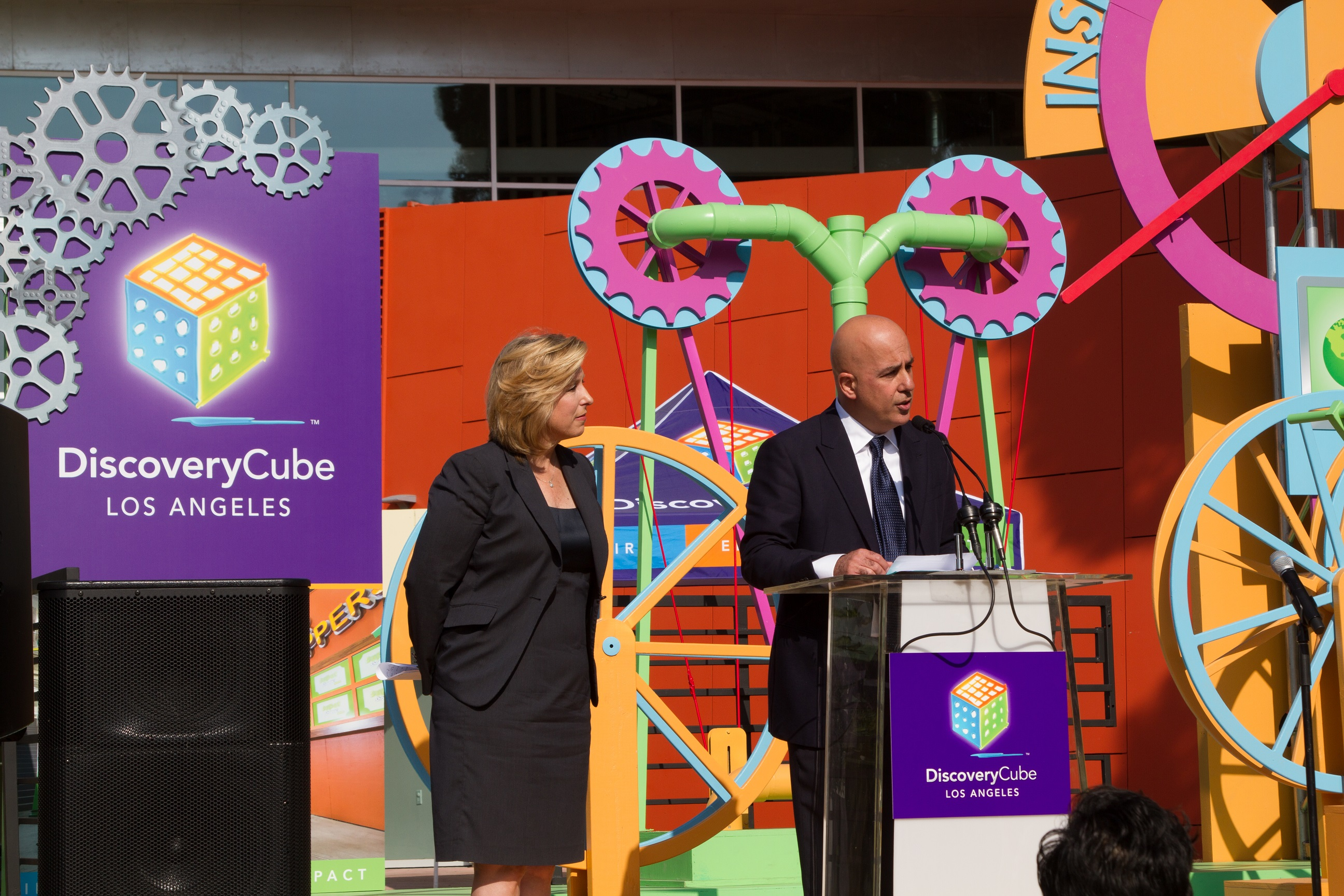
Salimpour speaking at the Discovery Science Museum with Wendy Greuel (left)

His research linking frequent bicycle riding and smoking with erectile dysfunction has been cited in various studies. He has been interviewed by media outlets such as The New York Times, the BBC, and CNN regarding this work.

== Philanthropy ==
Salimpour co-founded NexCare Collaborative, a nonprofit that provides health insurance assistance and medical referrals for foster children and low-income families around Los Angeles. He served as the organization's executive vice president from 2001 to 2005.
