= Hillcrest Medical Center at UC San Diego Health =

Teaching hospital in San Diego, California

- UC San Diego Health
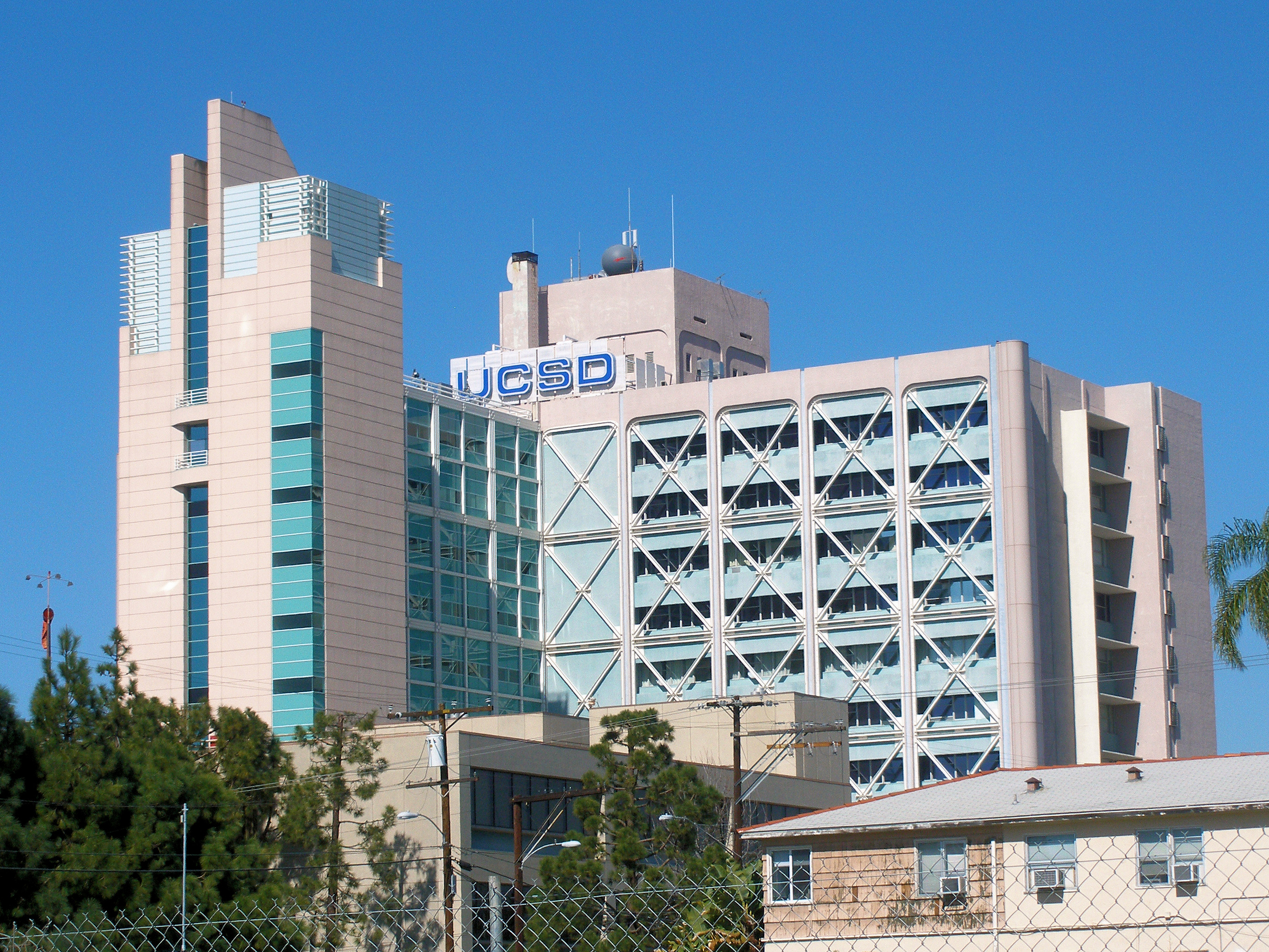
- UC San Diego Medical Center, Hillcrest inpatient tower

Geography
- Location: San Diego, California, United States
- Coordinates: 32.7544°N 117.1660°W

Organization
- Care system: Private
- Type: Teaching
- Affiliated university: University of California, San Diego

Services
- Emergency department: Level I trauma center
- Beds: 390

Helipads
- Helipad: Yes

History
- Founded: 1966

Links
- Website: health.ucsd.edu
- Lists: Hospitals in California

Hillcrest Medical Center at UC San Diego Health (previously known as UC San Diego Medical Center, Hillcrest and UC San Diego Medical Center) is a teaching hospital of UC San Diego Health at the University of California, San Diego.

The 390-bed hospital offers a range of primary care and specialized services and houses several regional services, including the San Diego Regional Burn Center and a Comprehensive Stroke Center. Its emergency department includes the first overall and sole academic Level I Trauma Center serving San Diego County and Imperial County.

== History ==
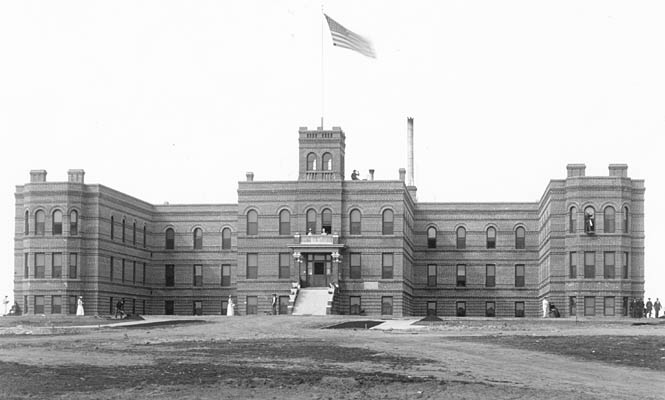
San Diego County Hospital, 1908

The history of medical care in Hillcrest dates back to 1904, when patients from the Poor Farm in Mission Valley were transferred to the new three-story San Diego County Hospital there. In 1958, the Regents of the University of California approved the creation of a medical school at the University of California, San Diego, coinciding with the county's plan to create a $12.5 million, 600-bed medical center to replace the structurally deficient county hospital. The eleven-story, 623-bed Hillcrest hospital opened in 1963, and control was transferred to UCSD in 1966 for an initial lease payment of $350,000 a year.

Over the next fifteen years, the renamed University Hospital expanded its services rapidly. In 1973, the Regional Burn Center was established, followed by the Regional Trauma Center in 1976, the Outpatient Center in 1977, and the Cancer Center in 1978. In 1981, the University of California system purchased the hospital from the county for $17 million. It continued to expand services, while reducing the number of inpatient beds as needed. In 1988, the creation of Thornton Hospital on the La Jolla campus allowed the regents to reduce the number of Hillcrest beds from 447 to 327. The hospital received a 78,000 square foot, $32 million facelift in 1992.

In 2005, UC San Diego announced future plans to consolidate its Hillcrest and La Jolla operations under one roof in La Jolla. This plan was met with considerable backlash, as neighboring hospitals and communities expressed concern about UCSD's interest in serving indigent communities. UCSD shelved these plans until 2010, when it announced construction of Jacobs Medical Center in La Jolla. The health system's new plan outlines a long-term Hillcrest presence past 2030.

== Facilities ==
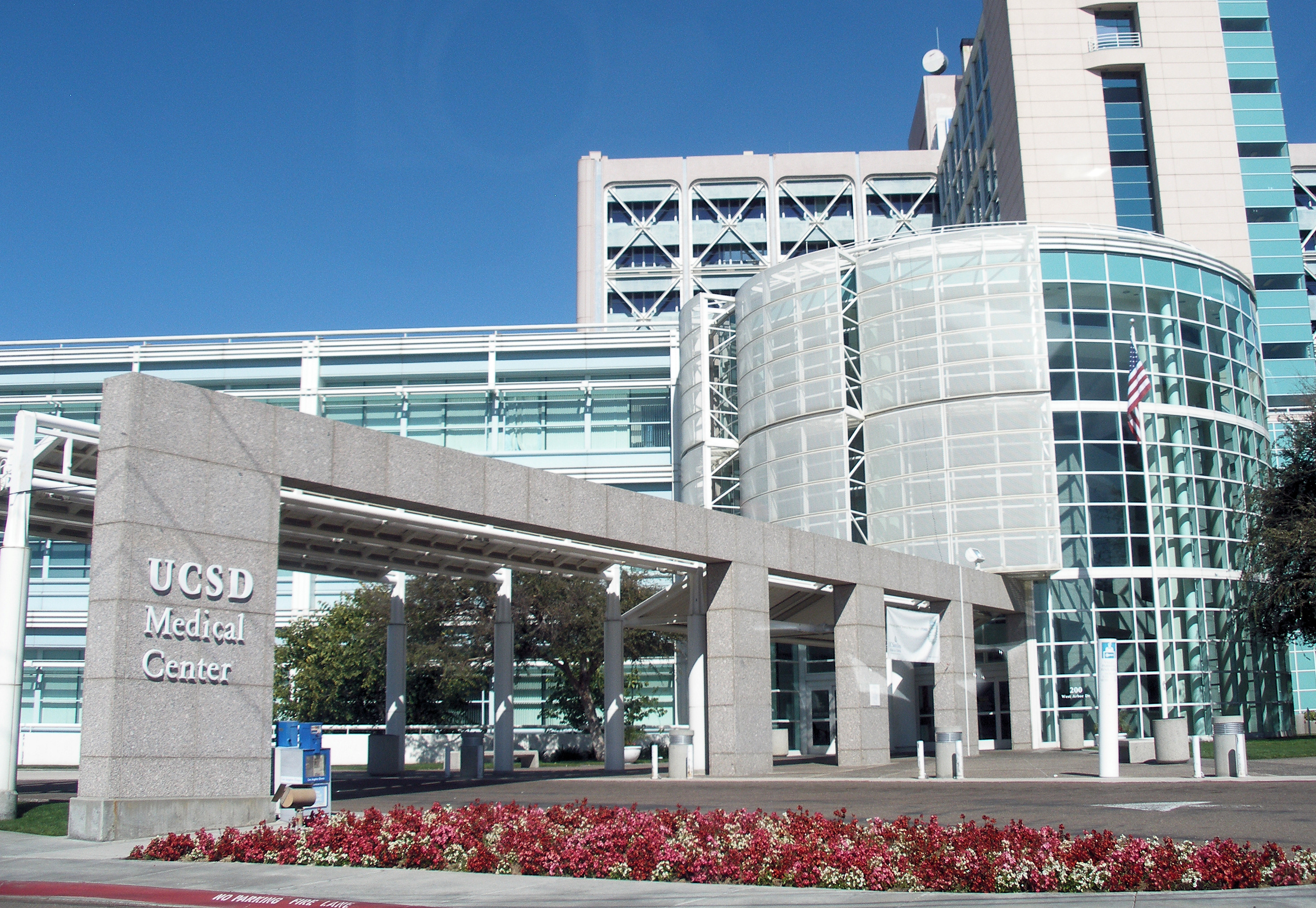
Hillcrest Medical Center at UC San Diego Health, Hillcrest entrance

The Hillcrest Medical Center at UC San Diego Health comprises 37 individual buildings on a 56-acre campus, of which seven are primarily facilities for patient care. The remaining structures serve a variety of support services, including administration, housing, teaching, and transportation. Of these seven, five are clinics scattered around the facility, one is the inpatient psychiatric unit, and one is the eleven-story hospital inpatient tower. The tower houses the vast majority of the medical complex's advanced services.

UCSD administration has been planning to replace the dated facility since 2005, as by 2030 it will be inoperable due to increased seismic regulations in California. Planners believe that it would be more cost-efficient to replace the facility than perform the necessary upgrades. The ten-story Jacobs Medical Center was originally proposed as a controversial replacement for the Hillcrest facility. San Diego residents and nearby hospitals such as Scripps Health argued that the move would leave South County patients underserved, and UCSD decided to build Jacobs Medical Center as a supplement to, not a replacement for, the Hillcrest campus. A long-range development plan is expected by 2018, and the replacement hospital on the current site will likely be completed by 2030.

== Services ==
A variety of advanced medical services are housed at the Hillcrest campus, including an emergency department and Level I Trauma Center, Regional Burn Center, HIV/AIDS Treatment Center, stroke center, birth center, and Surgical Intensive Care Unit.

The emergency department at Hillcrest Medical Center at UC San Diego Health handles 60,000 patients a year and operates the original Level I Trauma Center in San Diego County. Patients may arrive via ambulance or helicopter, as the hospital also serves Imperial County. The trauma center, which handles 3,000 patients annually, was remodeled in 2013 to modernize its facilities. The new services include a consolidated resuscitation center on the fifth floor with four dedicated beds and a camera monitoring system, as well as instant x-rays and electronic lab results. The expansion was coupled with a $14 million remodel to the first-floor emergency department, which added 12 private beds to the facility for a grand total of 36.

The stroke center at the hospital was one of the first five Joint Commission-certified comprehensive stroke centers in the country. It specializes in acute stroke, stroke prevention, and after-stroke care. The Regional Burn Center is a level 1 pediatric and adult burn unit, and is the sole burn center serving San Diego County, Camp Pendleton, and Imperial Valley. It has been the treatment center for numerous natural disasters, including the 2007 San Diego wildfires.

== Research and teaching ==
The medical center at Hillcrest is the location of much of UCSD's basic research and clinical research. Its researchers and clinicians coordinate their activities with researchers at the UC San Diego main campus and UC San Diego School of Medicine. The complex north of the hospital tower includes the Airway Research/Clinical Trials Center, one of several specialized research centers participating in phase I through phase IV clinical trials through UC San Diego Health. Clinical trials and translational research were centralized with the opening of the Altman Clinical and Translational Research Institute adjacent to Jacobs Medical Center in 2016.

Hillcrest Medical Center at UC San Diego Health is a well-regarded teaching hospital. Residency and fellowship programs are available in most medical specialties, including allergy, anesthesia, cardiology, emergency medicine, endocrinology, gastroenterology, geriatric medicine, hematology, hyperbaric medicine, immunology, internal medicine, nephrology, oncology, pediatrics, pulmonary and critical care medicine, and rheumatology. Hospital teams may be composed of attending physicians, hospitalists, residents, fellows, interns, medical students, and clinical pharmacists, but medical students would only be involved in care under an attending physician's supervision.
