= Quyen T. Nguyen =

Surgeon-scientist

- Education: University of Southern California; Washington University in St. Louis (MD/PhD)
- Known for: fluorescence guided surgery
- Spouse: Brett Berman
- Awards: Presidential Early Career Award for Scientists and Engineers (PECASE) 2014; Career Award for Medical Scientist (Burroughs Wellcome Fund, 2009); Fowler Award, Triological Society (2012)
- Scientific career
- Workplaces: University of California, San Diego
- Thesis: Pre-existing pathways promote precise projection patterns (2002)
- Doctoral advisor: Jeff W. Lichtman
- Website: profiles.ucsd.edu/quyen.nguyen; alumebiosciences.com

Quyen T. Nguyen is an American surgeon-scientist and Professor in the Department of Surgery at UC San Diego School of Medicine and associate director of Education and Training at Moores Cancer Center. She is known for her work pioneering fluorescence-guided surgery and co-holds several patents with Nobel Laureate Roger Y. Tsien, PhD pertaining to their invention of peptides, imaging systems, and methods to support fluorescence-guided cancer tumor resection and fluorescent labeling of nerves on the surgical bed.

== Education ==
Nguyen received a bachelor's degree in Psychobiology from the University of Southern California and an MD/PhD in Medicine and Neuroscience from Washington University School of Medicine in St. Louis, Missouri, in the lab of Jeff W. Lichtman. While in Lichtman's lab, Nguyen developed an in vivo fluorescence time-lapse imaging system to visualize motor nerve regeneration. She completed her General Surgery internship at Barnes-Jewish Hospital and a residency in Otolaryngology and Head and neck surgery at UC San Diego.

== Career and awards ==
Nguyen is board-certified in Head and Neck Surgery and Neurotology/Skull Base Surgery. She serves as Director of the Facial Nerve Clinic at UC San Diego, which provides evaluation and surgical treatment for patients with varying facial nerve dysfunctions. In her clinical practice she also treats and operates on patients with diseases of the ear and skull base. She is Professor of Surgery in the UC San Diego School of Medicine, and serves as associate director of Education and Training at UC San Diego Moores Cancer Center, where her focus is on providing equitable access to quality cancer education and training programs across all academic and faculty levels.

Nguyen and her research team have received a number of grants and awards, including support from the NIH and a Burroughs Wellcome Award in 2009, which have helped to support her research into fluorescence-guided surgery, hailed as a breakthrough in numerous news and scientific publications.

In 2014, Nguyen received the Presidential Early Career Award for Scientists and Engineers (PECASE) from President Barack Obama for her pioneering work in fluorescence-guided surgery. In 2017, Nguyen founded Alume Biosciences, a biotechnology startup with the goal of translating nerve agents developed in the lab to aid physicians in visualizing nerves in the operating room.

== See also ==
- Roger Y. Tsien – American biochemist and Nobel laureate (1952–2016)
