= ROR2 =

Protein

Identifiers
- Aliases: ROR2, BDB, BDB1, NTRKR2, receptor tyrosine kinase like orphan receptor 2
- External IDs: OMIM: 602337; MGI: 1347521; GeneCards: ROR2
Available structures
PDB	Ortholog search: PDBe RCSB
PDB	List of PDB id codes 3ZZW, 4GT4
Enzyme activity
EC #	BRENDA	ExPASy	KEGG	MetaCyc
2.7.10.1	↗	↗	↗	↗

Gene location (Human)
Chr.	Chromosome 9 (human)
Band	9q22.31	Start	91,563,091 bp
Band	9q22.31	End	91,950,228 bp

Gene location (Mouse)
Chr.	Chromosome 13 (mouse)
Band	13 B1|13 27.68 cM	Start	53,263,348 bp
Band	13 B1|13 27.68 cM	End	53,440,160 bp
RNA expression pattern
Bgee	Human / Mouse (ortholog); Top expressed in: muscle layer of sigmoid colon; gastric mucosa; body of uterus; canal of the cervix; ectocervix; right ovary; gonad; left uterine tube; right auricle of heart; left ovary / Top expressed in: primitive streak; muscle layer of urethra; external carotid artery; internal carotid artery; vas deferens; Paneth cell; dermis; condyle; endocardial cushion; migratory enteric neural crest cell; More reference expression data
BioGPS	n/a
Gene ontology
Molecular function	transferase activity; nucleotide binding; protein kinase activity; frizzled binding; metal ion binding; kinase activity; Wnt-protein binding; protein binding; transmembrane receptor protein tyrosine kinase activity; protein tyrosine kinase activity; ATP binding; coreceptor activity involved in Wnt signaling pathway, planar cell polarity pathway; mitogen-activated protein kinase kinase kinase binding; receptor tyrosine kinase; transmembrane signaling receptor activity
Cellular component	integral component of membrane; clathrin-coated endocytic vesicle membrane; membrane; plasma membrane; integral component of plasma membrane; cytoplasm; microtubule; cell surface; dendrite; soma; axon; receptor complex
Biological process	somitogenesis; skeletal system development; cell differentiation; cell fate commitment; SMAD protein signal transduction; phosphorylation; transmembrane receptor protein tyrosine kinase signaling pathway; positive regulation of cell migration; positive regulation of canonical Wnt signaling pathway; regulation of canonical Wnt signaling pathway; embryonic digit morphogenesis; Wnt signaling pathway; BMP signaling pathway; multicellular organism development; positive regulation of transcription, DNA-templated; embryonic genitalia morphogenesis; JNK cascade; protein phosphorylation; Wnt signaling pathway, calcium modulating pathway; inner ear morphogenesis; smoothened signaling pathway; negative regulation of canonical Wnt signaling pathway; cartilage condensation; signal transduction; negative regulation of cell population proliferation; peptidyl-tyrosine phosphorylation; Wnt signaling pathway, planar cell polarity pathway; astrocyte development; bone mineralization; male genitalia development; positive regulation of JUN kinase activity; positive regulation of macrophage differentiation; positive regulation of synaptic transmission, glutamatergic; positive regulation of protein kinase C activity; macrophage migration; negative regulation of signal transduction; negative regulation of apoptotic process; positive regulation of ERK1 and ERK2 cascade; anatomical structure development
Sources:Amigo / QuickGO
Orthologs
Databases	NCBI: entry; OMA: entry
Species	Human	Mouse
Entrez	4920	26564
Ensembl	ENSG00000169071	ENSMUSG00000021464
UniProt	Q01974	Q9Z138; Q8C3W2
RefSeq (mRNA)	NM_004560; NM_001318204	NM_013846
RefSeq (protein)	NP_001305133; NP_004551	NP_038874
Location (UCSC)	Chr 9: 91.56 – 91.95 Mb	Chr 13: 53.26 – 53.44 Mb
PubMed search
- Wikidata
View/Edit Human	View/Edit Mouse

Tyrosine-protein kinase transmembrane receptor ROR2, also known as neurotrophic tyrosine kinase, receptor-related 2, is a protein that in humans is encoded by the ROR2 gene located on position 9 of the long arm of chromosome 9. This protein is responsible for aspects of bone and cartilage growth. It is involved in Robinow syndrome and autosomal dominant brachydactyly type B. ROR2 is a member of the receptor tyrosine kinase-like orphan receptor (ROR) family.

== Function ==
The protein encoded by this gene is a receptor tyrosine kinase and type I transmembrane protein that belongs to the ROR subfamily of cell surface receptors. The protein may be involved in the early formation of the chondrocytes and may be required for cartilage and growth plate development.

== Clinical significance ==
Mutations in this gene can cause brachydactyly type B, a skeletal disorder characterized by hypoplasia/aplasia of distal phalanges and nails. In addition, mutations in this gene can cause the autosomal recessive form of Robinow syndrome, which is characterized by skeletal dysplasia with generalized limb bone shortening, segmental defects of the spine, brachydactyly, and a dysmorphic facial appearance.
