= Cirmtuzumab =

Monoclonal antibody

Monoclonal antibody
- Type: ?
- Source: Humanized
- Target: ROR1

Clinical data
- Other names: UC-961

Legal status
- Legal status: Investigational

Identifiers
- CAS Number: 1643432-38-5
- UNII: FEH7RQ7B3J

Cirmtuzumab (also UC-961) is an anti-ROR1 humanised monoclonal antibody.

It is an experimental drug in early-stage clinical trials for various cancers including chronic lymphocytic leukemia (CLL).
