= East Campus Medical Center at UC San Diego Health =

Teaching hospital in San Diego, California

- UC San Diego Health

Geography
- Location: San Diego, California, United States
- Coordinates: 32°46′36″N 117°03′25″W

Organization
- Care system: Private
- Type: Teaching
- Affiliated university: University of California, San Diego

Services
- Emergency department: Basic
- Beds: 302

History
- Former names: Alvarado Hospital (1972–2023), UC San Diego Health East Campus Medical Center (2023–2024)
- Founded: August 14, 1972

Links
- Website: Official website
- Lists: Hospitals in the United States

East Campus Medical Center at UC San Diego Health is a teaching hospital of UC San Diego Health at the University of California, San Diego.

It is a 306-bed acute care hospital operated by UC San Diego Health in San Diego, California, adjacent to San Diego State University (SDSU). It serves the College Area, San Diego, and is one of only two hospitals serving East County, San Diego.

== Overview ==
East Campus Medical Center at UC San Diego Health currently offers more than 15 specialties, including a 24/7 emergency department that is designated a San Diego County STEMI (severe heart attack) receiving center.

In addition to its emergency department, East Campus Medical Center at UC San Diego Health houses offers oncology, orthopedics, cardiovascular, otolaryngology, surgical weight loss and other specialties. The cancer program is certified by the American College of Surgeons Commission on Cancer. The hospital's surgical weight-loss program was nationally recognized in 1993 when surgeons there performed the first laparoscopic gastric bypass procedure in the United States.

The hospital operates a nationally recognized sexual medicine program – one of the first hospital-based sexual medicine programs to open in the country.

== History ==
The hospital opened on August 14, 1972, as Alvarado Community Hospital, a 124-bed facility. The hospital was expanded in the late 1980s. From its opening, Alvarado was owned by National Medical Enterprises, which was renamed Tenet Healthcare in 1995.

The early 2000s presented significant challenges for Alvarado Hospital. Federal investigations into alleged kickback schemes and reports of elevated mortality rates from heart bypass surgery impacted the hospital's reputation. This period of turmoil led to a change in ownership. In 2006, Tenet divested Alvarado, with Plymouth Health taking over. Prime Healthcare Services acquired the hospital in 2010.

Under both Plymouth and Prime, Alvarado's reputation improved, and the emergency department was remodeled, but the hospital was underutilized. By the 2020s, only a third of its 300 beds were occupied. To use some of this capacity, San Diego County announced in 2022 a plan to open a 62-bed behavioral health facility inside the hospital, to be operated by UC San Diego Health. However, the talks to have UC San Diego operate the facility were challenging, and the extra capacity at the rest of the facility was appealing to UC San Diego Health, which had two hospitals operating beyond maximum capacity. UC San Diego Health acquired Alvarado Hospital on December 11, 2023, for $200 million, renaming it UC San Diego Health East Campus Medical Center.

UC San Diego Health says it plans to continue with its plans to convert part of the hospital into a behavioral health facility, saying it would become the academic home for its Department of Psychiatry. UC San Diego Health also plans to renovate other patient floors, converting most rooms to single-occupancy. The changes will reduce the capacity of the hospital to 160 beds.

Sometime after the acquisition, UC San Diego quietly changed the official name of the hospital from UC San Diego Health East Campus Medical Center to East Campus Medical Center at UC San Diego Health.
