= Scott Lippman =

Scott M. Lippman is the former director of Moores Cancer Center at the University of California, San Diego and current professor of medicine at UC San Diego School of Medicine.

His clinical and translational research addresses head and neck and lung cancer, cancer genetics, predictive cancer biomarkers, and molecular targeting for cancer treatment.

== Education and career ==
A graduate of Grossmont High School, he completed his bachelor's degree at UC Irvine in biological science in 1977. He received his MD from Johns Hopkins University School of Medicine in 1981, followed by a residency in internal medicine at Harbor-UCLA Medical Center. He did fellowships at Stanford University in hematology and at University of Arizona Cancer Center in medical oncology and cancer prevention. He is board certified in hematology, internal medicine, and medical oncology. Following his fellowship at University of Arizona, he was recruited to MD Anderson's head and neck and lung cancer prevention and therapy program.

Prior to joining the Moores Cancer Center, he was the chair of Thoracic/Head and Neck Medical Oncology at the MD Anderson Cancer Center. He led the Lung Cancer Program of the MD Anderson Cancer Center and is co-investigator on the American Association for Cancer Research Stand Up to Cancer project involving molecular studies of pancreatic cancer interception.

He is the editor-in-chief of Cancer Prevention Research.

Lippman has received many awards including the 2007 American Society of Clinical Oncology-American Cancer Society Award, AACR Cancer Research and Prevention Foundation Award, and the ASCO Statesman Award, and was elected to the Association of American Physicians.

== Personal ==
He is married to Mary Lippman and has a daughter and two sons. His elder son Kyle was diagnosed with melanoma in 2015.
