= ROR1 =

Protein-coding gene in humans

Identifiers
- Aliases: ROR1, NTRKR1, dJ537F10.1, receptor tyrosine kinase-like orphan receptor 1, receptor tyrosine kinase like orphan receptor 1
- External IDs: OMIM: 602336; MGI: 1347520; GeneCards: ROR1

Gene location (Human)
Chr.	Chromosome 1 (human)
Band	1p31.3	Start	63,774,017 bp
Band	1p31.3	End	64,181,498 bp

Gene location (Mouse)
Chr.	Chromosome 4 (mouse)
Band	4 C6|4 45.71 cM	Start	99,952,988 bp
Band	4 C6|4 45.71 cM	End	100,301,962 bp
RNA expression pattern
Bgee	Human / Mouse (ortholog); Top expressed in: germinal epithelium; popliteal artery; tibial arteries; islet of Langerhans; right coronary artery; lower lobe of lung; saphenous vein; Descending thoracic aorta; sural nerve; buccal mucosa cell / Top expressed in: epithelium of lens; gastrula; umbilical cord; abdominal wall; decidua; medullary collecting duct; atrioventricular valve; efferent ductule; vestibular sensory epithelium; maxillary prominence; More reference expression data
BioGPS	n/a
Gene ontology
Molecular function	transmembrane receptor protein tyrosine kinase activity; nucleotide binding; protein binding; protein kinase activity; Wnt-protein binding; kinase activity; ATP binding; transferase activity; coreceptor activity involved in Wnt signaling pathway, planar cell polarity pathway; Wnt-activated receptor activity; receptor tyrosine kinase; transmembrane signaling receptor activity
Cellular component	receptor complex; integral component of plasma membrane; integral component of membrane; membrane; stress fiber; cytoplasm; cell surface; plasma membrane; axon terminus; axon; cell projection
Biological process	phosphorylation; protein phosphorylation; Wnt signaling pathway; transmembrane receptor protein tyrosine kinase signaling pathway; Wnt signaling pathway, planar cell polarity pathway; peptidyl-tyrosine phosphorylation; astrocyte development; hearing; positive regulation of I-kappaB kinase/NF-kappaB signaling; inner ear development; positive regulation of NF-kappaB transcription factor activity; negative regulation of signal transduction; cell differentiation; negative regulation of apoptotic process; positive regulation of ERK1 and ERK2 cascade; anatomical structure development
Sources:Amigo / QuickGO
Orthologs
Databases	NCBI: entry; OMA: entry
Species	Human	Mouse
Entrez	4919	26563
Ensembl	ENSG00000185483	ENSMUSG00000035305
UniProt	Q01973	Q9Z139
RefSeq (mRNA)	NM_001083592; NM_005012	NM_013845; NM_001312690
RefSeq (protein)	NP_001077061; NP_005003	NP_001299619; NP_038873
Location (UCSC)	Chr 1: 63.77 – 64.18 Mb	Chr 4: 99.95 – 100.3 Mb
PubMed search
- Wikidata
View/Edit Human	View/Edit Mouse

Tyrosine-protein kinase transmembrane receptor ROR1, also known as neurotrophic tyrosine kinase, receptor-related 1 (NTRKR1), is an enzyme that in humans is encoded by the ROR1 gene. ROR1 is a member of the receptor tyrosine kinase-like orphan receptor (ROR) family.

== Function ==
The protein encoded by this gene is a receptor tyrosine kinase that modulates neurite growth in the central nervous system. It is a type I membrane protein and belongs to the ROR subfamily of cell surface receptors. ROR1 is currently under investigation for its role in the metastasis of cancer cells.

ROR1 has recently been shown to be expressed on ovarian cancer stem cell, on which it seems to play a functional role in promoting migration/invasion or spheroid formation in vitro and tumor engraftment in immune-deficient mice. Treatment with a humanized mAb specific for ROR1 (UC-961) could inhibit the capacity of ovarian cancer cells to migrate, form spheroids, or engraft immune-deficient mice. Moreover, such treatment inhibited the growth of tumor xenografts, which in turn had a reduced capacity to engraft immune-deficient mice and were relatively depleted of cells with features of CSC, suggesting that treatment with UC-961 could impair CSC renewal. Collectively, these studies indicate that ovarian CSCs express ROR1, which may be targeted for anti-CSC therapy.

Zilovertamab vedotin (ZV), an antibody–drug conjugate comprising a monoclonal antibody recognizing extracellular ROR1, a cleavable linker and monomethyl auristatin E has entered clinical trials for the treatment of lymphoid malignancies.
