= Julia Stewart (businesswoman) =

American businesswoman

- Born: August 4, 1955 (age 70); United States
- Occupations: Serves on the board of directors for Avery Dennison and as a board member for the Children's Bureau of Southern California

Julia A. Stewart (born August 4, 1955) is an American businesswoman and former chief executive of DineEquity, Inc., now known as Dine Brands Global Inc., a publicly traded food and beverage company based in Pasadena, California.

== Career ==
In 1971, Stewart, when she was 16 years old, started working for International House of Pancakes (IHOP) as a waitress.

After college and before returning to IHOP in 2001, she was president of Applebee's domestic division.

Dine Brands Global was formed as "DineEquity" in 2007, when Stewart led IHOP to take over the larger Applebee's for US$1.9 billion and debt. Prior to the takeover, Stewart had led IHOP through 18 consecutive quarters of growth, by moving over to a primarily franchise-driven business model.

Stewart resigned the position of chief executive officer with DineEquity in February, 2017.

== Achievements ==
In 2006, Stewart ranked 49 on the Fortune magazine list of the 50 Most Powerful Women
