= Julia Stuart =

English novelist and journalist

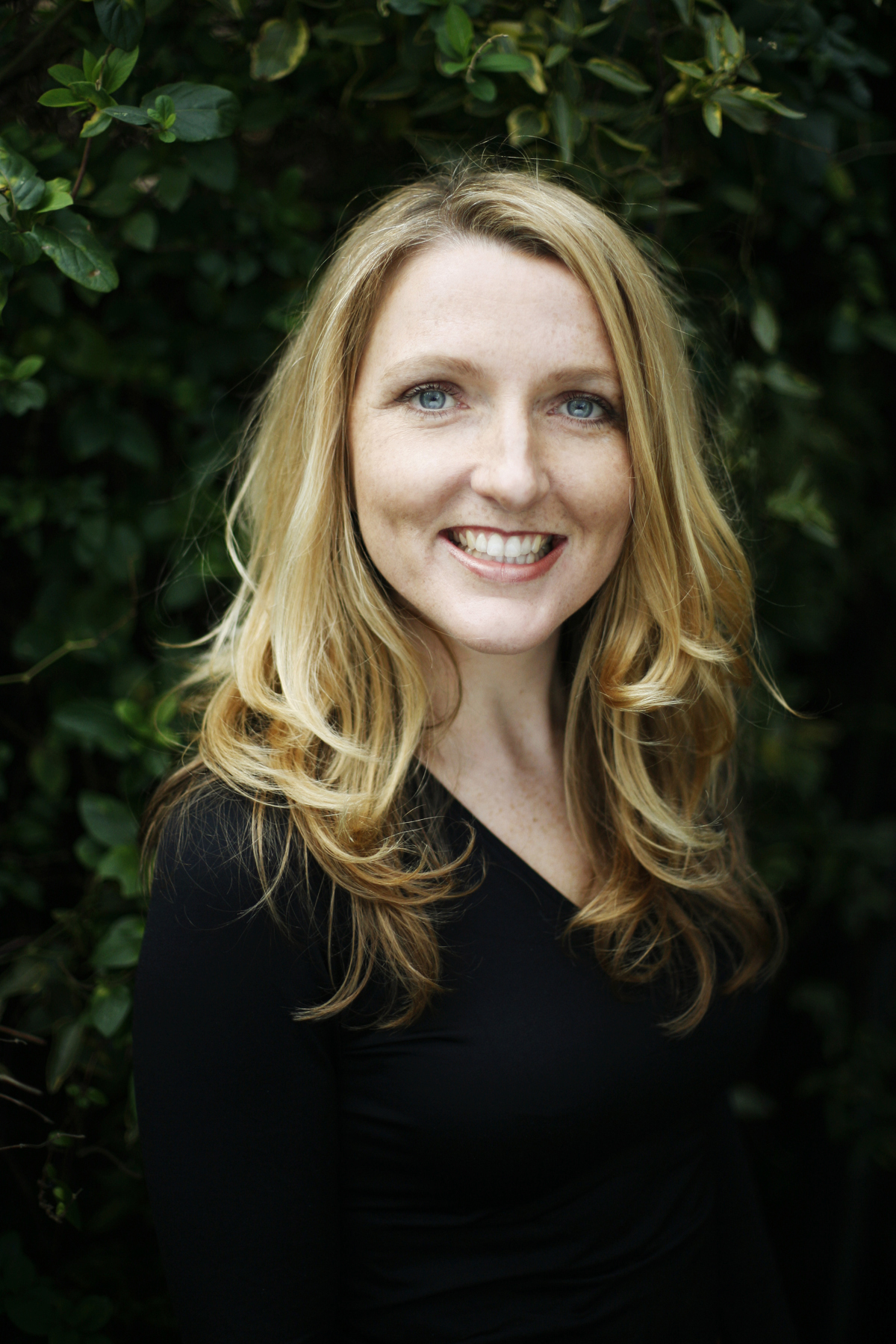
- Occupation: novelist
- Writing career
- Language: English
- Genre: fiction
- Notable works: The Matchmaker of Périgord, The Tower, the Zoo, and the Tortoise, The Pigeon Pie Mystery
- Website: www.juliastuart.com

Julia Stuart is an English novelist and journalist. She grew up in the West Midlands, England, and studied French and Spanish. She lived for a period in France and Spain teaching English.

After studying journalism, she worked on regional newspapers for six years. In 1999, Stuart won the periodicals category of the Amnesty International UK Media Awards. She was a feature writer for The Independent, and later The Independent on Sunday, for eight years. In 2007, she relocated to Bahrain and Egypt for three years. She graduated with an MA in creative writing from the University of East Anglia in 2013 and lives in London.

== Published works ==
Stuart's first novel, The Matchmaker of Périgord, was published in 2007. It is the story of a French barber whose business fails on account of his increasingly bald clients. In an attempt to make ends meet, he opens a matchmaking agency in his home village of Amour-Sur-Belle, whose feuding inhabitants subsequently find themselves on blind dates with each another. It was longlisted for Spread the Word: Books to Talk About 2008, a World Book Day award. Rat Pack Filmproduktion, which produced The Wave, have acquired the film rights. It has been adapted for screen by Andrew Birkin, who wrote and directed The Cement Garden (based on the novel by Ian McEwan), for which he won the Silver Bear for Best Director at the Berlin Film Festival.

In 2010, Stuart published her second novel, Balthazar Jones and the Tower of London Zoo. It tells of a Beefeater whose marriage is in tatters following the loss of his son. Owner of the oldest tortoise in the world, Balthazar learns to love again by caring for the inhabitants of the Tower’s newly installed menagerie. It was published as The Tower, the Zoo, and the Tortoise in the United States, where it became a New York Times bestseller, one of NPR's 2010 favorites, and a national bestseller.

Stuart's third novel, The Pigeon Pie Mystery was published in August 2012. The quirky Victorian mystery set in Hampton Court Palace tells of Mink, a headstrong Anglo-Indian princess, who sets out to save her maid from the hangman’s rope when the servant is suspected of poisoning the reviled Major-General Bagshot. It was selected as an Oprah.com Book of the Week and chosen as one of its "Unputdownable Mysteries."

Her latest novel, The Last Pearl Fisher of Scotland, was published in August 2016. It tells the story of Brodie McBride, the last expert in the ancient art of pearl fishing, who is on a quest to track down the pearl that will complete a necklace for his wife, Elspeth, convinced that the love token will save their marriage. But Scotland's rivers are running out of mussels, Elspeth is running out of patience, and their daughter, Maggie, is running wild with her moustachioed pet rabbit. And when Maggie takes matters into her own hands, determined to keep the family together, the McBrides are soon at the centre of international commotion that will change everyone's lives forever.
