= Diane Damiano =

American biomedical scientist and physical therapist

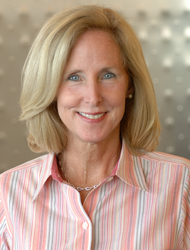
- Education: Catholic University of America; Duke University; University of Virginia
- Scientific career
- Fields: Biomechanics, rehabilitation medicine
- Institutions: University of Virginia; Washington University in St. Louis; National Institutes of Health Clinical Center
- Thesis: Effects of Quadriceps Strengthening on Functional Gait in Children With Spastic Diplegia (1993)
- Doctoral advisor: Luke E. Kelly

Diane Louise Damiano is an American biomedical scientist and physical therapist specializing in physical medicine and rehabilitation approaches in children with cerebral palsy. She is chief of the functional and applied biomechanics section at the National Institutes of Health Clinical Center. Damiano has served as president of the Clinical Gait and Movement Analysis Society and the American Academy for Cerebral Palsy and Developmental Medicine.

== Education ==
Damiano completed a B.A. in biological sciences at the Catholic University of America in 1974. In 1979, she earned a M.S. in physical therapy from Duke University. Damiano completed a Ph.D. in research methods and biomechanics in the School of Education and Human Development (then the Curry School of Education) at the University of Virginia. Her 1993 dissertation was titled, Effects of Quadriceps Strengthening on Functional Gait in Children With Spastic Diplegia. Her doctoral advisor was Luke E. Kelly and Kit Vaughan served as her mentor.

== Career and research ==
Damiano is a biomedical scientist and physical therapist. She worked in the department of orthopaedics at the University of Virginia where she was promoted to associate professor on the tenure track, and the department of neurology at Washington University School of Medicine. Damiano joined the NIH Intramural Research Program and works as the chief of the functional and applied biomechanics section in the rehabilitation medicine department of the National Institutes of Health Clinical Center.

A robotic exoskeleton created by Daminano and NIH researchers

Damiano's area of expertise is in the investigation of both existing and novel rehabilitation approaches in children with cerebral palsy. Several years ago, she was one of the first researchers to recognize that spastic muscles were weak and needed strengthening. Her work in this area has improved the treatment of these patients. She researches the role of physical activity in enhancing motor coordination and promoting muscle and neural recovery in those with brain injuries. Her lab uses non-invasive brain technologies such as electroencephalography (EEG) and near-infrared spectroscopy to study motor coordination in children and adults with cerebral palsy and traumatic brain injury. Her research involving children with cerebral palsy aims to enhance their movement capabilities in the short term and exploit the inherent neuroplasticity and muscular plasticity for more permanent and sustainable functional gains. In 2017, Damiano and a team of researchers created a robotic exoskeleton designed to treat crouch (or flexed-knee) gait in children with cerebral palsy by providing powered knee extension assistance at key points during the walking cycle.

Damiano has published more than 90 papers in peer-reviewed journals. She currently sits on the editorial board of Neurorehabilitation and Neural Repair, Developmental Medicine & Child Neurology, and the Journal of Pediatric Rehabilitation. Damiano is a past president of the Clinical Gait and Movement Analysis Society (GCMAS) and the current president — the first physical therapist to serve in the role in the organization's 61-year history — of the American Academy for Cerebral Palsy and Developmental Medicine. She is a member of the scientific advisory board of the United Cerebral Palsy Research and Education Foundation.

== Awards ==
In 1994, Damiano became a fellow of the American Academy of Cerebral Palsy and Developmental Medicine.

== Selected works ==
- Damiano, Diane L.; Vaughan, Christopher L.; Abel, Mark E. (August 1995). "Muscle Response to Heavy Resistance Exercise in Children with Spastic Cerebral Palsy". Developmental Medicine & Child Neurology. 37 (8): 731–739. doi:10.1111/j.1469-8749.1995.tb15019.x. PMID 7672470. S2CID 33519087.
- Damiano, Diane L.; Abel, Mark F. (February 1998). "Functional outcomes of strength training in spastic cerebral palsy". Archives of Physical Medicine and Rehabilitation. 79 (2): 119–125. doi:10.1016/S0003-9993(98)90287-8. PMID 9473991.
- Damiano, Diane L. (November 2006). "Activity, Activity, Activity: Rethinking Our Physical Therapy Approach to Cerebral Palsy". Physical Therapy. 86 (11): 1534–1540. doi:10.2522/ptj.20050397. ISSN 0031-9023. PMID 17094192. S2CID 2642390.
- Damiano, Diane L. (September 2009). "Rehabilitative Therapies in Cerebral Palsy: The Good, the Not As Good, and the Possible". Journal of Child Neurology. 24 (9): 1200–1204. doi:10.1177/0883073809337919. ISSN 0883-0738. PMC 2982789. PMID 19525491.
