= Louis Jolyon West =

American psychiatrist

- West in 1961
- Born: October 6, 1924; Brooklyn, New York, U.S.
- Died: January 2, 1999 (aged 74); Los Angeles, California, U.S.
- Occupation: Psychiatrist
- Spouse: Kathryn Hopkirk (m. 1944)
- Children: 3

Louis Jolyon "Jolly" West (October 6, 1924 – January 2, 1999) was an American psychiatrist who was a longtime consultant and contractor for the Central Intelligence Agency (CIA).

West worked in the United States Air Force as a medical officer. He pioneered research into brainwashing techniques employed against American prisoners of war (POWs) by their captors. His research exonerated U.S. servicemen under suspicion of treason for making false confessions during the Korean War era. This brought him to the attention of the CIA. West became involved in research into the use and abuse of LSD and other drugs, becoming a contractor for MKUltra, a CIA mind control project in the 1950s and 1960s. In 1954, at the age of 29, West became a full professor and chair of psychiatry at the University of Oklahoma College of Medicine. In 1967, West operated in San Francisco's Haight-Ashbury district to conduct research into the hippie movement there. From 1969 to 1989, West served as chair of psychiatry at the University of California, Los Angeles School of Medicine and director of the UCLA Neuropsychiatric Institute.

West frequently worked as a court-appointed psychiatrist and examined Jack Ruby and Patricia Hearst during their trials. West was also active in studying the creation and management of cults and anti-death penalty activism. He was a supporter of the Civil Rights Movement and participated in sit-ins and rallies. He made several trips to South Africa, where he testified on behalf of black prisoners during the attempt to end apartheid. West was a trustee of the American Psychiatric Association and served as a consultant to a variety of governmental organizations, including the United States Air Force, the Peace Corps and the United States Information Agency.

== Early life ==
West was born in Brooklyn, New York, (Note: In the Los Angeles Times, West's birthplace was named as Madison, Wisconsin) to a Ukrainian Jewish immigrant father and a mother who taught piano. He grew up in poverty in Madison, Wisconsin, and was a graduate of Madison East High School. He subsequently attended the University of Wisconsin–Madison for a year and, after completing prerequisite coursework at the University of Iowa under the aegis of the Army Specialized Training Program during World War II, earned his M.D. from the University of Minnesota Medical School in 1949. Thereafter, he completed his residency at the Payne Whitney Psychiatric Clinic of Cornell University on the Upper East Side of Manhattan in 1952.

== Air Force ==
=== Korean War POWs and brainwashing ===
West was an officer in the United States Air Force Medical Service from 1948 to 1956, attaining the rank of major. After completing his residency, he was assigned as Chief of Psychiatric Service at the 3700th USAF Hospital at the Lackland Air Force Base in San Antonio, Texas. At Lackland he was appointed to a panel to discover why 36 of 59 airmen captured in the Korean War had confessed or cooperated in North Korean allegations of war crimes committed by the United States. Amid speculation that the airmen had been brainwashed or drugged, West came to a simpler conclusion: "What we found enabled us to rule out drugs, hypnosis or other mysterious trickery," he said. He observed that "[i]t was just one device used to confuse, bewilder and torment our men until they were ready to confess to anything. That device was prolonged, chronic loss of sleep." The airmen avoided being court-martialed for these events as a result of West's research.

He then published a paper with the title "United States Airforce prisoners of the Chinese Communist. Methods of forceful indoctrination: Observations and Interviews."

=== Jimmy Shaver ===
In 1954, West testified in the trial of airman Jimmy Shaver, who was executed for the murder of Chere Jo Horton. West was ordered to conduct the psychiatric evaluation of Shaver. West hypnotized Shaver and injected him with sodium pentothal in an attempt to remove his amnesia. While Shaver was under hypnosis, he confessed to killing the young girl. At trial, he maintained his innocence. West argued that Shaver suffered temporary insanity on the night of Chere Jo Horton's killing.

== University of Oklahoma ==
In 1954, at the age of 29 and with no previous post-residency fellowship or tenure-track appointment, West became a full professor and chair of psychiatry at the University of Oklahoma College of Medicine. Along with friend Charlton Heston, he supported the Civil Rights Movement, frequently participating in sit-ins and rallies in Oklahoma City. West commuted between Lackland AFB and Oklahoma City until he was discharged in July 1956, at which time he became OU's full-time chief of psychiatry.

== Project MKUltra ==
Cornell University, where West completed his residency in psychiatry, was an MKUltra institution and the site of the Human Ecology Fund. West's success with POWs brought him to the attention of the Central Intelligence Agency. The CIA's Technical Services Staff Chemical Division head Sidney Gottlieb, whose code-name for the operation was Sherman Gifford, acted as West's handler. In a letter to Gottlieb dated June 11, 1953, two months after MKUltra started, West outlined the experiments he proposed to perform using a combination of psychotropic drugs and hypnosis. He became a contractor for MKUltra subproject 43, a 20,800 USD grant by the CIA while he was chairman of the department of Psychiatry at the University of Oklahoma (OU). For his role, he received TOP SECRET security clearance from the CIA. The proposal submitted by West in 1956 was titled "Psychophysiological Studies of Hypnosis and Suggestibility" with an accompanying document titled "Studies of Dissociative States". In it, West claimed to have discovered a way to replace "true memories" with "false ones" in human beings without their knowledge through the use of hypnotic suggestion. He wrote that his discovery was the result of "new drugs" which, when administered, accelerated a hypnotic state and deepened a trance.

While at Oklahoma, West received funds from the Geschickter Fund for Medical Research, which he called "a non-profit private research foundation", but which was actually a shell organization run by Georgetown pathologist Charles Freeman Geschickter to funnel funds for CIA behavioral research.

In August 1977, The New York Times revealed that West was one of the researchers involved in behavior experiments for the CIA. In September 1977, OU president Paul F. Sharp announced he was notified by the CIA that OU was one of 80 institutions that unknowingly conducted LSD research. West commented that his research had been confined to animals, and that he was unaware that the research funds came from the CIA. He also said others at OU were doing research on LSD at the time.

=== LSD-related death of an elephant ===
One of the more unusual incidents in West's career took place in August 1962. He and two co-workers attempted to investigate the phenomenon of musth in elephants by dosing Tusko, a bull elephant at the Lincoln Park Zoo in Oklahoma City, with LSD. They expected that the drug would trigger a state similar to musth; instead, the animal began to have seizures 5 minutes after LSD was administered. Beginning twenty minutes later, West and his colleagues administered the antipsychotic promazine hydrochloride; they injected a total of 2800 mg over 11 minutes. This large promazine dose was not effective and may have contributed to the animal's death. It died an hour and 40 minutes after the LSD was given. Later, many theories developed about why Tusko had died. Some researchers thought that West and his colleagues had made the mistake of scaling up the dose in proportion to the animal's body weight, rather than its brain weight, and without considering other factors, such as its metabolic rate. Another theory was that while the LSD had caused Tusko distress, the drugs administered in an attempt to revive him caused death. Attempting to prove that the LSD alone had not been the cause of death, Ronald K. Siegel of UCLA repeated a variant of West's experiment on two elephants; he administered to two elephants equivalent doses (in milligrams per kilogram) to that which had been given to Tusko, mixing the LSD in their drinking water rather than directly injecting it. Neither elephant expired or exhibited any great distress, although both behaved strangely for a number of hours.

=== 1967 San Francisco "crash pad" ===
After completing a fellowship at the Center for Advanced Study in the Behavioral Sciences in Stanford, California while on leave from Oklahoma during the 1966–1967 academic year, West "led a group of researchers to San Francisco's Haight-Ashbury district, where they rented an apartment and studied the hippie culture" during the latter half of 1967 under a contract with the Foundations Fund for Research in Psychiatry, Inc. University of Hawaiʻi at Mānoa psychologist Anthony J. Marsella has alleged that the Foundations Fund was employed as a CIA funding conduit during the Vietnam War.

== Jack Ruby ==
Following the murder of Lee Harvey Oswald in Dallas, Texas in 1963, his killer, Jack Ruby, was held in an isolation cell in police custody. West was appointed as Ruby's psychiatrist, and pronounced him psychotic and delusional, and suggested further interrogation under the influence of sodium thiopental and hypnosis. West stated that Ruby had developed an acute psychotic state which had gotten worse and would continue to do so. He therefore suggested that Ruby be removed from jail and hospitalised. He claimed that this was "precipitated by the stress of [his] trial". West helped convince the court that Ruby should not be sentenced to death. West had become a vocal critic of the death penalty after witnessing a gruesome execution in Wisconsin. For years, he led a movement of doctors against the death penalty.

== Lance Rentzel ==
West disclosed his treatment of National Football League flanker and University of Oklahoma alumnus Lance Rentzel after he was arrested twice (in 1966 and 1970) for indecent exposure to young girls in the epilogue of When All the Laughter Died in Sorrow, the athlete's 1972 memoir. (West's family had been acquainted with Rentzel's family during their time at the university.) Noting that "it is most unusual for a psychiatrist to permit his relationship with a patient to become public knowledge," West acknowledged that Rentzel "had many injuries, including a number of severe concussions," presaging contemporary medicine's greater understanding of chronic traumatic encephalopathy among American football players. He also asserted that he was "required to make periodic reports of [Rentzel's] progress to several public and private agencies."

== UCLA ==
From 1969 to 1989, West served as chair of psychiatry at the University of California, Los Angeles School of Medicine and director of the UCLA Neuropsychiatric Institute. He was recruited to UCLA by dean Sherman Mellinkoff.

Shortly after arriving at UCLA, he set out to create a center for the study of interpersonal violence, known by the names "Center for the Study and Reduction of Violence" or "Center for the Long-Term Study of Life-Threatening Behavior". Among its plans was a project to "gather unprecedented amounts of behavioral data and centrally store it to identify emergent crime". By 1972, the project received state funding and was anticipating federal and private grants. In 1973, governor Ronald Reagan voiced his support for the center in his State of the State address. West's plans for the center were blocked at the last minute by the California legislature due to a public outcry from several organizations who believed the center would conduct inhumane practices. Most prevalent were allegations that the center would refer patients to undergo psychosurgery. West later described the ordeal as "the most frustrating experience of my career".

== Patty Hearst trial ==
During Patty Hearst's 1976 trial, West was appointed by the court in his capacity as a brainwashing expert and worked without fee. West and Margaret Singer conducted extensive interviews with Hearst, producing a 35‐page report to the court. West testified for the defense that Hearst was not in her right mind when she participated in the bank robbery with the Symbionese Liberation Army (SLA). Believing that Hearst displayed all the classic signs of coercion, brainwashing, and the Stockholm effect, West wrote a newspaper article after the trial, asking President Carter to release Hearst from prison. Some weeks after her arrest, Hearst repudiated her SLA allegiance.

In her 1982 memoir Every Secret Thing, Hearst described West with the following: "I thought he had a creepy hypnotic voice. A tall, heavyset man who appeared to be kindly, I suspected "Jolly" of being too smooth, too soothing to be trust." She describes West reducing her to crying, murmuring and mumbling, to which he reacted by accusing her of refusing to cooperate fully with him. She said he "tried to be gentle and kind, I suppose" but that his questions became "more intimate and personal" and that she thought he was "inordinately interested in the sex that went on within the SLA, particularly in the lesbian relationships". She credited his interrogation with extracting her repressed memories, although "very slowly and painfully". Before their meeting, she felt the doctors would strip her of her "last shreds of privacy" and subject her to the same interrogation that Donald DeFreeze inflicted upon her.

== South Africa ==
West made several trips to South Africa to support people facing political persecution. His visits were arranged at the request of Amnesty International, the International Lawyers Committee for Civil Rights, several South African universities, and other groups.

In 1977, he traveled to South Africa to testify on behalf of a group of ten Zulus who had been charged with conspiracy against the security of the state. West testified that their confessions to crimes they did not commit were the result of torture and other inhumane interrogation tactics.

West returned to South Africa in 1983 and again in 1984 to testify on behalf of Auret Van Heerden, a white anti-apartheid activist was imprisoned and tortured by police. West, who examined Van Heerden, testified in court that Van Heerden suffered post-traumatic stress disorder as a result of the torture.

== Cults ==
West was active in studying the creation and management of cults. He was considered an "expert in cult behaviors" and frequently appeared on news media to offer insight into cults such as Heaven's Gate. West was a member of the American Family Foundation, which was formed by members of the anti-cult movement to provide education and research on cults in the United States. In a memorial of West, the American Family Foundation wrote in their The Cult Observer that the "leadership and legitimacy he lent the AFF's effort cannot be exaggerated". In 1989, the Cult Awareness Network awarded West its highest honor, the Leo J. Ryan award, for "extraordinary courage, tenacity and perseverance in the battle against tyranny over the mind of man." West was also on the advisory board of the False Memory Syndrome Foundation.

=== Conflict with Scientologists ===
According to West, Scientologists attempted to discredit him and get him fired, using methods similar to those used in Operation Freakout. This was allegedly done after his contributions to a 1980 textbook that classified Scientology as a cult.

West participated in an American Psychiatric Association panel on cults. Each speaker had received a letter threatening a lawsuit if Scientology were mentioned; apparently others were intimidated. Only West, the last speaker, referred to the letter and the cult:

"I read parts of the letter to the 1,000-plus psychiatrists and then told any Scientologists in the crowd to pay attention. I said I would like to advise my colleagues that I consider Scientology a cult and L. Ron Hubbard a quack and a fake. I wasn't about to let them intimidate me."

== Personal life ==
In 1944, West married psychologist Kathryn Hopkirk, whom he met as a freshman at the University of Iowa. Together they had two daughters, Anne and Mary, and a son, John.

In the late 1950s, West befriended the English novelist and philosopher Aldous Huxley.

== Death ==
In 1999, West died at his home in Los Angeles at the age of 74. His family said the cause of death was metastatic cancer. However, West's son John would later assert in a 2009 memoir that he helped his father end his life at the latter's choice by using prescription medication due to the terminal illness.

== Works ==
- "Pseudo-Identity and the Treatment of Personality Change in Victims of Captivity and Cults." In: Dissociation: Clinical and Theoretical Perspectives, with Steven Jay Lynn and Judith W. Rhue, eds. New York: Guilford Press (Aug. 1994). ISBN 978-0898621860.
- Drug Testing: Issues and Options, with Robert H. Coombs, eds. New York: Oxford University Press (Apr. 1991). ISBN 978-0195054149.
- Alcoholism and Related Problems: Issues for the American Public. American Assembly Series. Englewood Cliffs, NJ: Prentice-Hall (Oct. 1984). ISBN 978-0130214867.
- "Cults, Quacks and Non-professional Psychotherapies" (with M.T. Singer). In: Comprehensive Textbook of Psychiatry, with H. Kaplan and B. Sadock. 3rd ed. Baltimore: Williams and Wilkins (1980), pp. 3245–58.
- Hallucinations: Behavior, Experience, and Theory, with Ronald K. Siegel, eds. New York: John Wiley & Sons (Oct. 1975). ISBN 978-0471790969.
- West, L. J.; Pierce, C. M.; Thomas, W. D. (1962). "Lysergic Acid Diethylamide: Its Effect on a Male Asiatic Elephant". Science. 138 (3545): 1100–1103. Bibcode:1962Sci...138.1100J. doi:10.1126/science.138.3545.1100. PMID 17772968.
- "Brainwashing, Conditioning and DDD (Debility, Dependency, and Dread)," with I. E. Farber and Harry F. Harlow. Sociometry, vol. 20, no. 4 (1957), pp. 271–285. JSTOR 2785980.
