= Bruce Dobkin =

American neurologist

Bruce Dobkin, MD
- Education: Hamilton College, 1969; M.D., Temple University School of Medicine, 1973; Internal Medicine Internship, University of California, Los Angeles, 1974; Neurology Residency, UCLA Neuropsychiatric Hospital, 1977
- Occupation: Physician
- Years active: 1977–present
- Medical career
- Profession: Doctor
- Field: Neurology
- Institutions: David Geffen School of Medicine at UCLA
- Sub-specialties: Clinical Trials, Concussion, General Neurology, Head Trauma, Rehabilitation, Spine, Stroke
- Research: Hodgson, J. A.; Roy, R. R.; De Leon, R.; Dobkin, B.; Edgerton, V. R. (1994). "Can the mammalian lumbar spinal cord learn a motor task?". Medicine and Science in Sports and Exercise. 26 (12): 1491–1497. doi:10.1249/00005768-199412000-00013. PMID 7869884.

Bruce H. Dobkin is an American Professor emeritus of Neurology at the David Geffen School of Medicine at UCLA, medical director of the UCLA Neurologic Rehabilitation and Research Program, and Co-Director of the UCLA Stroke Center. He serves as editor-in-chief of Neurorehabilitation and Neural Repair.

== Education and career ==
Dobkin studied at Hamilton College and Temple University School of Medicine before completing his residency at the University of California, Los Angeles. specialising in neurology. He currently serves on the board of directors at the American Society of Neurorehabilitation and is a fellow of the American Neurological Association. He is also chairman of the Neural Repair and Rehabilitation section at the American Academy of Neurology and is a managing director of the World Federation of NeuroRehabilitation. He has also been elected a Distinguished Fellow of the Royal College of Physicians, and has given over 100 lectures worldwide.

Dobkin has written several books on neurology and the work of doctors within that field. In 1986 he wrote Brain Matters: Stories of a Neurologist and His Patients which was published by Crown Publishing Group, and in 2003 The Clinical Science of Neurologic Rehabilitation through Oxford University Press. He has also contributed chapters to books by others, including Neurology in Clinical Practice and Stroke: Pathophysiology, Diagnosis, and Management. His journal articles have been published in the New England Journal of Medicine, Neurology, the Journal of Neurophysiology, the Journal of Neurosurgery and many others.

== Bibliography ==
- Dobkin, Bruce H. (1986). Brain Matters: Stories of a Neurologist and His Patients. Crown Publishing Group.
- — (February 1996). "The Shrinking Deficit". Vital Signs. Discover. 17 (2): 34–36.
- — (2003). The Clinical Science of Neurologic Rehabilitation. Oxford UP.
