= David Geffen School =

David Geffen School may refer to:

- David Geffen School of Medicine at UCLA
- Yale School of Drama
