= Babak Larian =

American physician

Babak Larian is an American physician who is the director of the Center for Advanced Head & Neck Surgery in Beverly Hills, Los Angeles. He is also the director of the Head and Neck Cancer Center at Cedars-Sinai. He is also involved at the Cedars-Sinai Thyroid Cancer Center and the Cedars-Sinai Sinus Center. Currently he also serves as the assistant clinical professor of surgery at the David Geffen School of Medicine. Larian is the current medical director of the HELPS International Medical Mission. As a medical author, he has served as a member of the editorial review panel for several peer-reviewed journals. He is the managing partner of the LaPeer Surgery Center, a medical organization specializing in various fields including Plastic & Reconstructive Surgery.

== Academic career ==
Larian did his medical education at the University of California, Irvine School of Medicine. He did his surgical training at the Ronald Reagan UCLA Medical Center. He received the Merk Manual Award in 1996. He specializes in the treatment of all head and neck cancers, including complex advanced tumors, skull base tumors and recurrent cancers.

Larian has been featured in various media outlets and magazines such as PSP (Plastic Surgery Practice), the Globe Health Report, and the Health Radar.

== Professional affiliations ==
Larian is professionally affiliated to the following institutes and organizations:

- Board Certified, 2003, American Academy of Otolaryngology–Head and Neck Surgery.
- Fellow, 2007, American Head & Neck Society.
- Fellow, 2006, American College of Surgeons.
- California Medical Association
- Los Angeles Society of Otolaryngology–Head and Neck Surgery
- Alpha Omega Alpha Honor Medical Society
- Phi Beta Kappa Society

== Humanitarian causes ==
Larian is actively involved in Medical Missions for Children, an independent, non-profit organization that works to improve health outcomes of the world's critically ill children. He is also involved in other charity ventures such as the Global Smile Foundation, Helps International and Los Angeles Free Clinic.

== Recognition ==
In 2011, Larian was named by U.S. News & World Report as one of the Top Doctors in the field of ENT. He has also won accolades for his medical research, including those in the field of micro parotidectomy, minimally invasive thyroidectomy, and balloon sinuplasty. He has served as a member of the editorial review panel for several peer-reviewed journals, the most prominent being Archives of Otolaryngology–Head & Neck Surgery, Journal of Cranio-Maxillofacial Trauma, Otolaryngology–Head and Neck Surgery, Archives of Facial Plastic Surgery and Head and Neck Surgery.

== Publications ==
- Azizzadeh, Babak; Buga, Georgette M.; Berke, Gerald S.; Larian, Babak; Ignarro, Louis J.; Blackwell, Keith E. (2003). "Inhibitors of Nitric Oxide Promote Microvascular Thrombosis". Archives of Facial Plastic Surgery. 5 (1): 31–5. doi:10.1001/archfaci.5.1.31. PMID 12533135.
- Azizzadeh, Babak; Enayati, Pedram; Chhetri, Dinesh; Maghami, Ellie; Larian, Babak; Blackwell, Keith E.; Abemayor, Elliot; Calcaterra, Thomas C. (2002). "Long-term Survival Outcome in Transhyoid Resection of Base of Tongue Squamous Cell Carcinoma". Archives of Otolaryngology–Head & Neck Surgery. 128 (9): 1067–70. doi:10.1001/archotol.128.9.1067. PMID 12220214.
- Larian, Babak; Alavi, Sassan; Roesler, John; Namazie, Ali; Blackwell, Keith; Calcaterra, Thomas C.; Wang, Marilene B. (2001). "The role of hyperplasia in multiple parathyroid adenomas". Head & Neck. 23 (2): 134–9. doi:10.1002/1097-0347(200102)23:2<134::AID-HED1008>3.0.CO;2-J. PMID 11303630. S2CID 44643676.
- Larian, B; Wong, B; Crumley, RL; Moeinolmolki, B; Muranaka, E; Keates, RH (1999). "Facial trauma and ocular/orbital injury". The Journal of Cranio-maxillofacial Trauma. 5 (4): 15–24. PMID 11951261.
- Givens, Kerry T.; Lee, David A.; Kothschiller, Jim; Kitada, Shinichi; Larian, Babak; Cortes, Andres (1990). "Antiproliferative drugs and human ocular fibroblasts: Colorimetric vs. Cell counting assays". Current Eye Research. 9 (6): 599–606. doi:10.3109/02713689008999599. PMID 2143720.
