= SonoSim =

Ultrasound training software company

SonoSim, Inc.
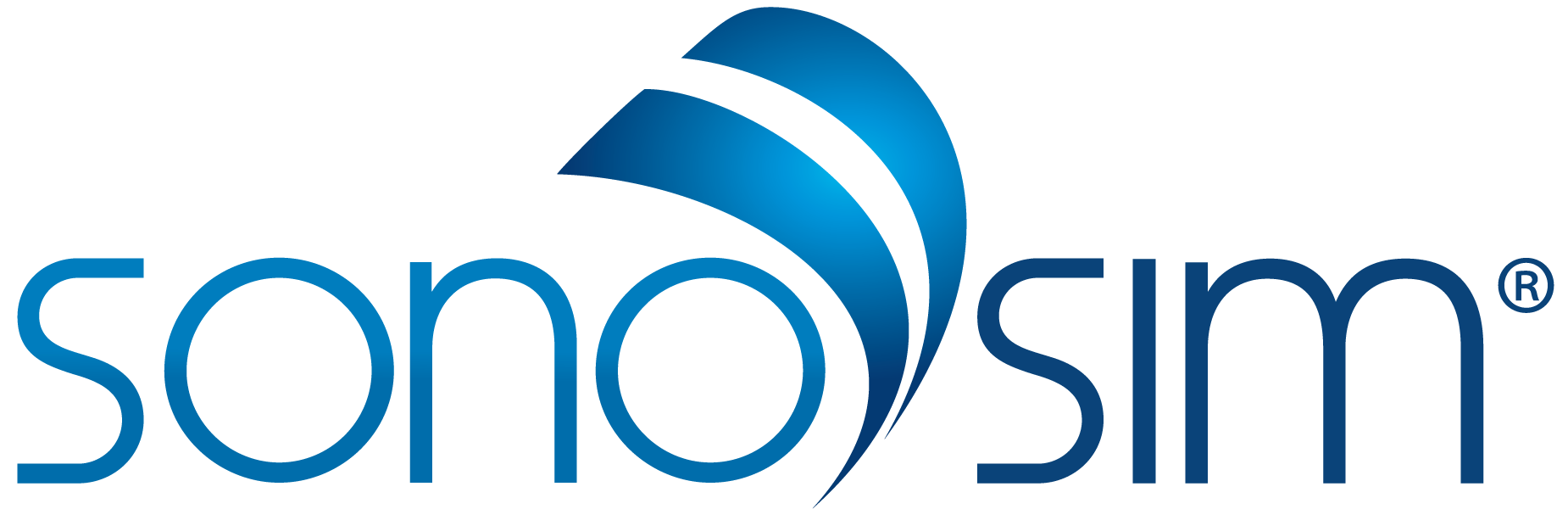

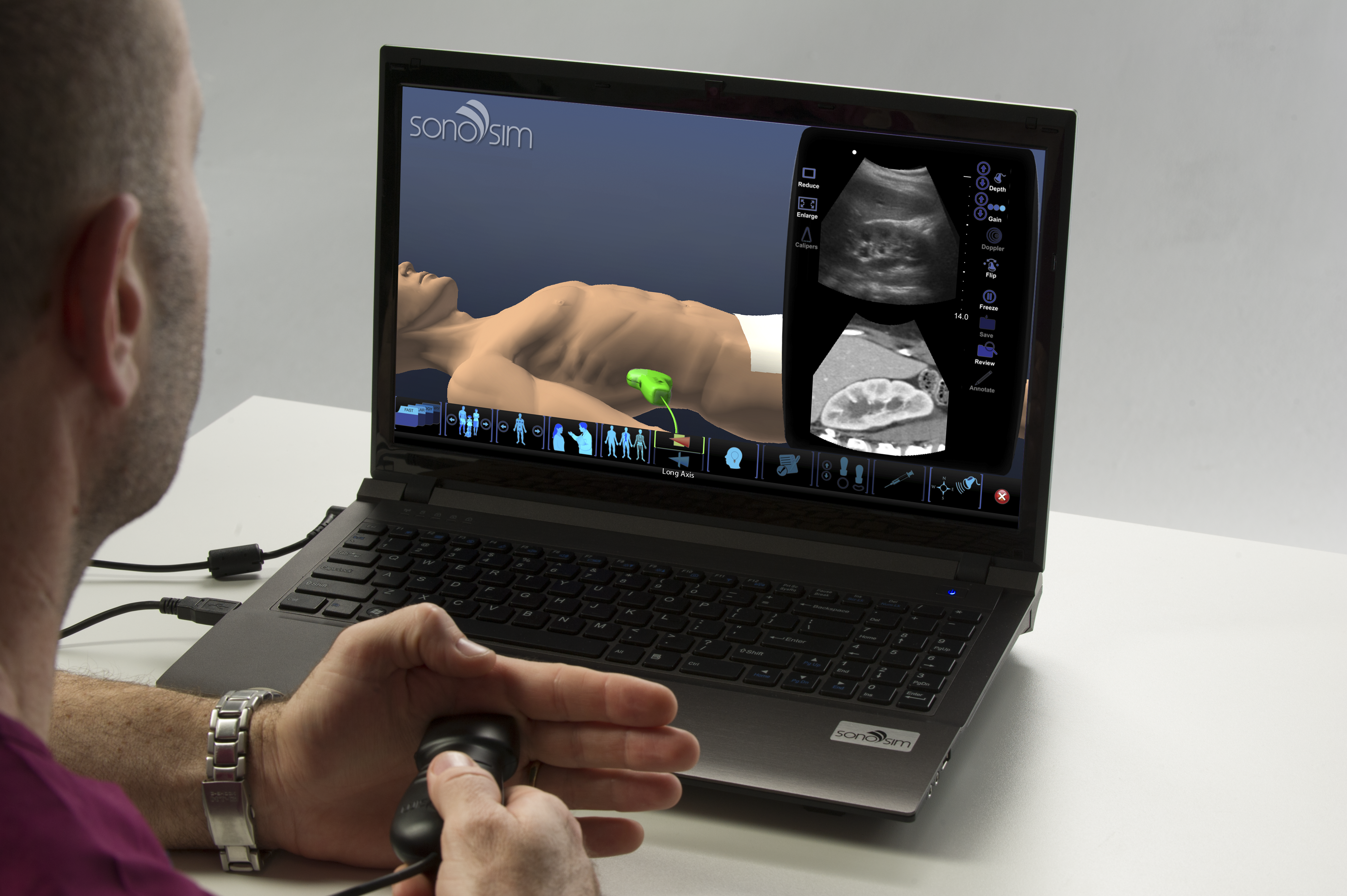
- Type: Private
- Industry: Medical Education
- Founded: 2010
- Headquarters: Venice, California, US, United States of America
- Area served: Worldwide
- Products: SonoSim Ultrasound Training, SonoSim LiveScan, SonoSim for Individuals
- Number of employees: 40 (approx.)
- Website: SonoSim.com

SonoSim, Inc. is a medical education software development company that develops and distributes an ultrasound education and training product. The company was founded in 2010 by physicians and medical educators to address the growing need for ultrasound training in healthcare.

== History ==
=== 2000 to 2007: SonoSim Origins ===
In 2004, researchers at University of California Los Angeles developed a personal computer-based medical simulator to address medical education challenges that The UCLA Center for International Medicine (CIM) identified on prior medical missions.

=== 2007 to 2011: Early Development ===
In 2007, Pelagique, LLC received Phase I funding from the Small Business Innovation Development Act’s SBIR program through the US Department of Defense. It was to address governmental need for ultrasound education, specifically within the United States military for combat casualty care providers. Pelagique’s Phase I work began that same year, there was a need for hand-carried ultrasonography as a frontline tool for military care providers in Iraq and Afghanistan.

In 2008, Phase II, team members acquired detailed video footage of the management and care of severe battlefield injuries in Iraq (e.g., IED-related injuries). The video footage was used to create a real case-based training curriculum to prepare military care providers for future deployments. This training program (including training DVDs and a companion textbook, Combat Casualty Care: Lessons Learned in OEF and OIF) was distributed in 2010 at the 2010 Advanced Technology Applications to Combat Casualty Care(ATACCC) conference. This curriculum was then integrated into standard per-deployment training for United States Army medical personnel and allied countries.

=== 2011 to Present ===
In 2011, SBIR Phase III involved Pelagique establishing SonoSim Inc. to domestically distribute its products, the SonoSimulator and the SonoSim Ultrasound Training Solution.

== Operations ==
=== Product ===
SonoSim offers various personalization options for ultrasound training through its USB-powered probe and SonoSimulator. This system allows users to perform scans on live volunteers or mannequins using traditional methods, with immediate expert guidance and probe-positioning assistance provided via a laptop. Additionally, SonoSim offers online courses, such as one aimed at improving medication administration safety. The training content is organized into individual modules, each containing a SonoSim Course, Assessment, and hands-on training case. These modules are designed to provide detailed, personalized instruction and assessment tailored to each learner's needs. SonoSim categorizes these modules into four distinct types.

=== Medical School Integration ===
SonoSim has been integrated into several US medical school curricula, most notably the Western University of Health Sciences and the University of Kentucky College of Medicine.

SonoSim is currently used in over 500 medical institutions with over 30,000 total users.

== International Operations ==
In October 2013, SonoSim International was launched by SonoSim International President, Derek McLeish. In September 2014, SonoSim entered into a partnership with Laerdal Corporation, a provider of training, educational, and therapy products for emergency medical care. As of December 2014, SonoSim has developed a distributor network in 29 countries.

SonoSim works with global charitable organizations such as SANA Medical NGO. In March 2016, SANA received a SonoSim Edition through a grant from the Elmer and Mamdouha Bobst Foundation. SANA has been using SonoSim to teach nurse midwives how to perform ultrasound following the International Society of Ultrasound in Obstetrics and Gynecology (USUOG) Six-Step Approach.

== Awards ==
In 2012, Combat Casualty Care: Lessons Learned in OEF and OIF (2010)—the textbook created as part of Phase II efforts—received a Washington Book Publishers Award.
