= UCLA Mattel Children's Hospital =

- UCLA Health

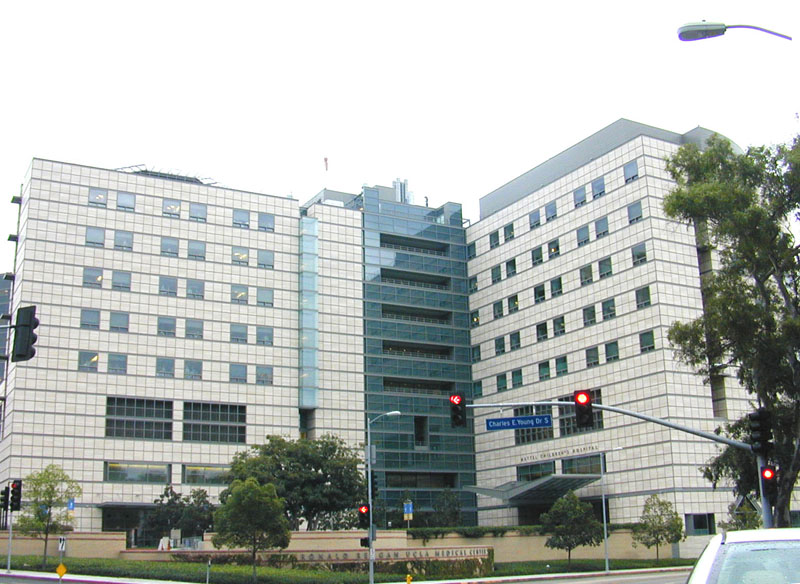
- The main entrance to UCLA Mattel Children's.

Geography
- Location: 757 Westwood Plaza, Los Angeles, CA
- Coordinates: 34.066351°N 118.447094°W

Organisation
- Type: Children's hospital
- Affiliated university: David Geffen School of Medicine at UCLA

Services
- Emergency department: Level I Pediatric Trauma Center
- Beds: 156

History
- Former name: UCLA Children's Hospital
- Constructed: 1999
- Opened: 2008

Links
- Website: https://www.uclahealth.org/mattel/

UCLA Mattel Children's Hospital (MCH) at Ronald Reagan UCLA Medical Center is a nationally ranked pediatric acute care children's hospital located in Los Angeles, California. The hospital has 156 pediatric beds, is affiliated with the University of California, Los Angeles David Geffen School of Medicine, and is a member of UCLA Health. The hospital provides comprehensive pediatric specialties and subspecialties to pediatric patients aged 0–21 throughout California. Mattel Children's also sometimes treats adults that require pediatric care. UCLA Mattel Children's Hospital features an ACS verified pediatric level 1 trauma center. The UCLA Mattel Children's Hospital is located on the third and fifth floors of the newly constructed Ronald Reagan UCLA Medical Center.

== History ==
It was founded in 1950 as the UCLA Department of Pediatrics and was located in the Marion Davies wing of the old UCLA Medical Center, which was named after Marion Davies, the celebrated actress who donated $1.8 million to fund the construction. The wing was operational starting in 1962, renamed in 1998, until moving into the new hospital in 2008. The Marion Davies wing included a 20-bed pediatric intensive care unit, 22 bed level IV neonatal intensive care unit, a 77-bed general pediatrics ward, and a children's outpatient center. The hospital became a member of the National Association of Children's Hospitals and Related Institutions as a hospital within a hospital.

In 1994, the medical center was damaged by the 1994 Northridge earthquakes and administration started planning for a rebuild. Executives from Mattel donated $25 million to help fund the development of the children's hospital, and UCLA stated that the donation covered 75% of the construction of their pediatric facilities. The name of "UCLA Mattel Children's Hospital" was given to the hospital to honor the donations from Mattel, Inc.

In 2011, it was revealed that some patient data from Mattel Children's was stolen when criminals broke into a doctors house and stole a hard drive of patient information.

Large donations for the hospital have also come from celebrities throughout Hollywood including Gwyneth Paltrow and Alexandra and Sean Parker who raised $2.5 million from various events.

In 2017, Mattel donated $50 million to the hospital to help expand pediatric services and fund pediatric medical research at the hospital. The single donation was the largest ever made to UCLA Mattel Children's Hospital. The donation is also believed to be the largest ever made by Mattel.

== About ==
While not onsite, the Ronald McDonald House of Los Angeles is located a few miles away adjacent to Children's Hospital Los Angeles.

The hospital operates an American Academy of Pediatrics verified level IV neonatal intensive care unit with the capacity of 22 beds for critically ill newborns.

=== Patient care units ===
MCH occupies 2 floors of UCLA Ronald Reagan Medical Center and is made up of the following units:

- 44 bed General Pediatric Unit
- 22 bassinet Neonatal ICU
- 18 bed Pediatric ICU
- 6 bed Pediatric Cardiac ICU

=== Daltrey/Townshend TYA Cancer Program ===
The UCLA Daltrey/Townshend Teen & Young Adult Cancer Program is a center to serve teens and young adult cancer patients at the Ronald Reagan UCLA Medical Center. The units are designed to provide the feeling of a normal life, assisting young patients in dealing with difficult diagnoses and long stays in the Medical Center. The program is run through the Mattel Children's Hospital and housed in their pediatric units.

The center was made possible through the work of Roger Daltrey and Pete Townshend of the rock band The Who. The opening on November 4, 2011, was attended by Daltrey, and also musicians Robert Plant and Dave Grohl. The musicians presented an autographed guitar to be hung on the walls of the center, and the program launch was followed by a fund-raising event on November 5.

=== Awards ===
In 2015 the hospital was ranked on the list of "The 50 Most Amazing Children's Hospitals in the World" by Healthcare Administration DP.

UCLA Mattel Children's was also listed on the Parents Magazine "20 Top Children's Hospitals in Innovation and Technology" for its advanced treatment protocols and flexible family friendly spaces.

In 2020 UCLA Mattel Children's Hospital has placed nationally in all 10 ranked pediatric specialties on U.S. News & World Report and is ranked as the second best (behind Children's Hospital Los Angeles) in the Los Angeles area.

As of 2021, UCLA Mattel Children's Hospital has placed nationally in 7 out of 10 ranked pediatric specialties on U.S. News & World Report a decrease of 3 ranked specialties from the previous year.

2021 U.S. News & World Report Rankings for UCLA Mattel Children's Hospital
Specialty	Rank (In the U.S.)	Score (Out of 100)
Neonatology	#27	81.9
Pediatric Cancer	#33	76.0
Pediatric Diabetes & Endocrinology	#50	64.1
Pediatric Gastroenterology & GI Surgery	#25	79.6
Pediatric Nephrology	#26	73.4
Pediatric Neurology & Neurosurgery	#40	72.9
Pediatric Orthopedics	#38	68.4

== See also ==
- List of children's hospitals in the United States
- Children's Hospital Los Angeles
- David Geffen School of Medicine at UCLA
