= UCLA IMG Program =

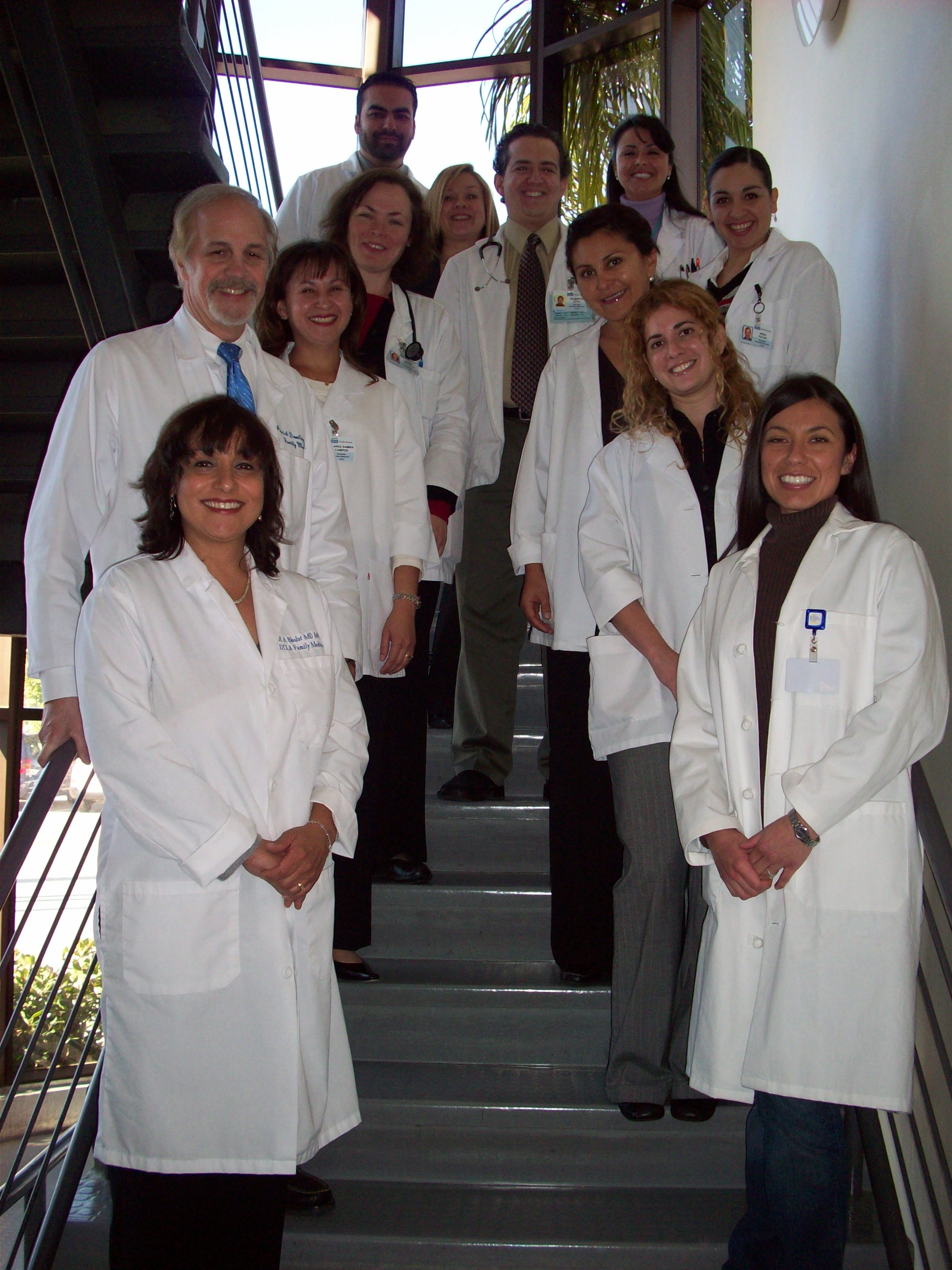
Dr. Michelle Bholat and Dr Patrick Dowling (Co founders and Co-Directors of the UCLA IMG Program with some of the IMGs participants.

The UCLA International Medical Graduate (IMG) Program is a non-profit educational program for Hispanic International Medical Graduates who are residing in the US legally. Housed in the Dept of Family Medicine of the David Geffen School of Medicine at UCLA in Los Angeles, California the IMG Program was created to train immigrant physicians who could address the linguistic and cultural barriers to care faced by California's largely underserved Hispanic population.

The term international medical graduate, or IMG, is used to describe a physician who has graduated from a medical school outside of the U.S. or Canada. One in every four of the over 900,000 practicing physicians in the United States is an IMG. Generally, the medical school of graduation is one listed in the International Medical Education Directory (IMED) as accredited by the Foundation for Advancement of International Medical Education and Research or the World Health Organization. This has been the subject of many medical articles because many of these doctors come from developing countries, and as such, some consider this a "brain drain".

== Objective ==
In California, Hispanics represent 37% of the states 37 million population yet only 5% of the physician workforce. Further, almost 35% of California's Hispanics reside in medically underserved areas (MUAs) compared to 20% of the total population. To supplement the outreach and pipeline efforts by UCLA and the other California medical schools to train more Hispanic and English/Spanish bilingual physicians, the UCLA Department of Family Medicine (DFM) developed the IMG program to address the state's changing demographics and impending physician shortage.

The program seeks to provide bilingual English/Spanish IMGs, who are committed to the care of underserved populations, with a comprehensive program to pass the U.S. Medical Licensing Examinations (USMLE) and compete for Family Medicine Residency program positions in California. The paramount objective of the UCLA IMG Program is to place well-trained family physicians in rural and urban underserved communities.

== Participants ==
Today the program has participants from Venezuela, Argentina, Belize, Chile, Colombia, Costa Rica, Dominican Republic, Puerto Rico, Cuba, Spain, Mexico, Peru.

== Directors ==
The program was implemented in 2006 by Patrick Dowling MD, MPH, Chair of the Department of Family Medicine and by Michelle Bholat MD, MPH, Vice Chair of the Department of Family Medicine at David Geffen School of Medicine at UCLA.

== Components ==
- Program A - USMLE Step 1 Preparation - Pasadena, CA

Entails a time commitment of at least 50 hours per week. Consists of the Kaplan Deluxe Program of videos, live lectures and question banks; with the expectation that the USMLE-1 examination will be completed within 6 months of starting the program. UCLA no longer provides assistance with USMLE Step 1 as of June 1 2018

- Program B - USMLE Step 2 Clinical Knowledge and Clinical Skils Preparation - Santa Monica – UCLA Medical Center & Orthopedic Hospital & UCLA Les Kelley Family Health Center (LKFHC)

Time commitment of at least 50 hours per week.

- Program C - Observership

Applicants with competitive scores on the USMLE-1 and USMLE-2 CK and CS will be invited to participate in a two-month observership at the UCLA DFM clinics, as UCLA Les Kelley Family Health Center, the Santa Monica-UCLA Medical Center & Orthopedic Hospital, the Mid Valley Comprehensive Health Center (Van Nuys, California) and Olive View-UCLA Medical Center (Sylmar, California). Observership participants help UCLA physicians with providing same-day healthcare services for patients. Time commitment of 6 days per week with some overnight calls. Priority will be given to candidates who have attained both ECFMG certification and the PTAL.

- Post observership participation: Continued participation at Olive View-UCLA Medical Center on a volunteer basis.

A letter of recommendation, in support of the applicant to a Family Medicine Residency Program in California, will be provided to those who receive outstanding evaluations during Program C. The program also oriented the participants for the ERAS application, a computer application that transmits supporting credentials from a residency applicant to residency program directors electronically ( Electronic Residency Application service ) and the NRMP (Match).

== Results ==
Since its inception in 2006 the program has placed 54 bi-lingual, bi-cultural graduates into 15 different Family Medicine training programs in California. In 2011, the program helped 13 IMGs match in Family Medicine Residency Programs.

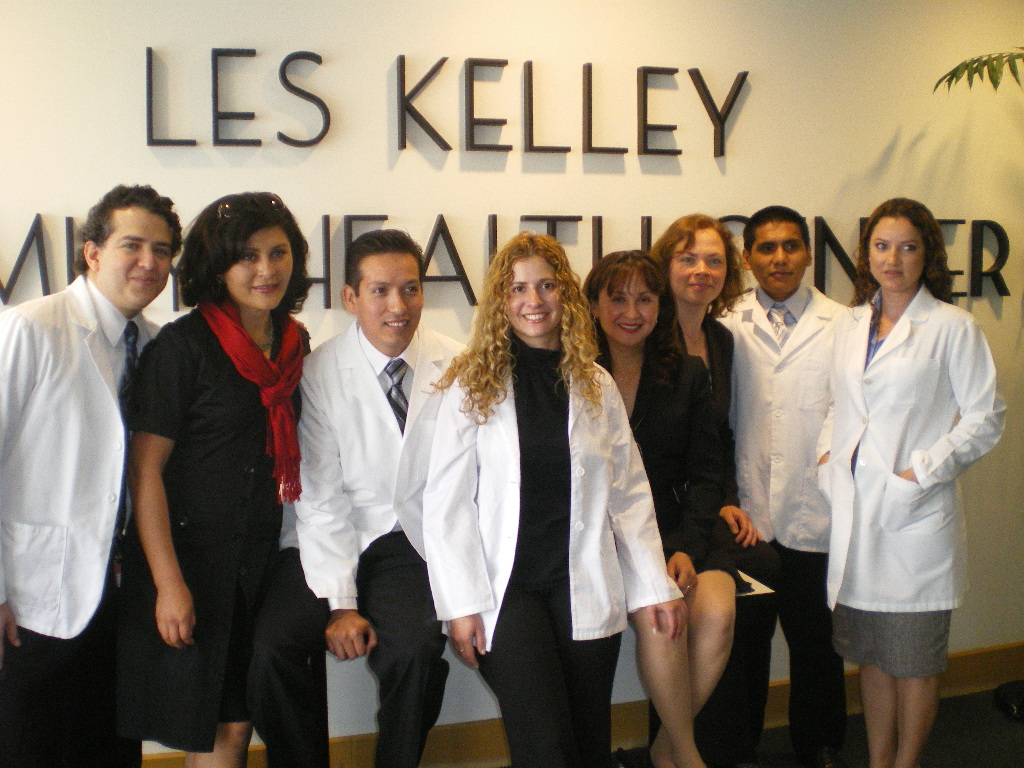
UCLA IMG Program Participants during Match Day 2008.

== Sponsorship ==
The UCLA IMG Program is funded solely by private sources. The financial support the program has received has supported the continuation of the IMG program.

The sponsors of the program are:

- California Endowment
- UniHealth Foundation
- New American Alliance Foundation
- Molina Family Foundation
- Dean Gerald Levey; Dean Gene Washington
