= Ronald P. Karlsberg =

American academic and cardiologist

- Education: University of California, San Francisco (MD, 1973)
- Occupations: Cardiologist; Academic
- Employers: Cedars-Sinai Medical Center; David Geffen School of Medicine at UCLA
- Known for: Coronary CT angiography; Cardiac health informatics; Point-of-care medical devices
- Awards: America's Top Cardiologists (2006); Excellence in Teaching Award (2011)

Ronald P. Karlsberg is an American academic and cardiologist. He is a clinical professor of medicine at the Cedars-Sinai Medical Center and the David Geffen School of Medicine at UCLA, specializing in clinical, preventive, and interventional cardiology.

== Early life and education ==
Karlsberg was born in Syracuse, New York, to Eduard and Erna Karlsberg, German Jewish refugees who fled Nazi Germany in 1936 and settled in the United States via Buenos Aires.

Karlsberg received his medical degree from the University of California, San Francisco, completed his residency at the University of Colorado Medical Center, and pursued a fellowship in cardiology at Washington University School of Medicine in St. Louis, Missouri. He is board certified in internal medicine, cardiovascular disease, and cardiovascular computed tomography.

== Research and career ==
Karlsberg began his career as an academic at the University of California, Irvine, where he served as the director of cardiac wards and research at the Long Beach VA. He later joined the faculty at UCLA. His clinical and research work has focused on coronary artery disease.

Karlsberg developed an early web-based electronic health record system for cardiology practice, described in a 2008 profile in Cardiovascular Business. He teaches a continuing medical education course in coronary CT angiography.

Karlsberg has commented publicly on the clinical use of consumer and point-of-care cardiac monitoring technology. He has been an active member of the informatics committee of the American College of Cardiology (ACC) and has contributed to the development of national electronic record standards for cardiac outcomes. He has been on the Board of the Society of Cardiovascular Computed Tomography (SCCT), establishing standards in that field. The ACC appointed him to the Intersociety Commission for the Accreditation of Computed Tomographic Laboratories (ICACTL).

He was a co-author of the 2009 Society of Cardiovascular Computed Tomography guidelines for the interpretation and reporting of coronary computed tomographic angiography, and an investigator in the multinational CONFIRM registry and the MERIT-HF trial. In 2024 he was named a Master of the Society of Cardiovascular Computed Tomography (MSCCT). Among his publications was the first human case documenting statin-associated slowing of noncalcified coronary plaque in a patient with a calcium score of zero, measured by serial AI-assisted coronary CT angiography.

Karlsberg co-founded and serves as chairman of the organization now known as the National Institute for Cardiovascular Research and Innovation (niCVRI), previously the Cardiovascular Research Foundation of Southern California. niCVRI sponsors the SCCT niCVRI–Karlsberg Best Abstract Award, presented at the society's Annual Scientific Meeting.

His research interests focus on translational research in the areas of clinical cardiology, coronary CT angiography, medical imaging, health informatics, artificial intelligence, point-of-care medical monitoring, and multicenter medical research trials.

Karlsberg was appointed to the United States Preventive Services Task Force by Robert F. Kennedy Jr. in September 2026.

== Recognition ==
Karlsberg was named one of America's Top Cardiologists by the Consumers' Research Council of America in 2006, and received the "Excellence in Teaching Award" from the Cedars-Sinai Heart Institute, Cardiology Department in 2011.

== Selected publications ==
- Raff, Gilbert L.; Chair; Abidov, Aiden; Achenbach, Stephan; Berman, Daniel S.; Boxt, Lawrence M.; Budoff, Matthew J.; Cheng, Victor; Defrance, Tony; Hellinger, Jeffrey C.; Karlsberg, Ronald P. (April 9, 2009). "SCCT guidelines for the interpretation and reporting of coronary computed tomographic angiography". Journal of Cardiovascular Computed Tomography. 3 (2): 122–136. doi:10.1016/j.jcct.2009.01.001. PMID 19272853.
- Cheng, V. Y.; Berman, D. S.; Rozanski, A.; Dunning, A. M.; Achenbach, S.; Al-Mallah, M.; Budoff, M. J.; Cademartiri, F.; Callister, T. Q.; Chang, H. J.; Chinnaiyan, K.; Chow, B. J.; Delago, A.; Gomez, M.; Hadamitzky, M.; Hausleiter, J.; Karlsberg, R. P.; Kaufmann, P.; Lin, F. Y.; Maffei, E.; Raff, G.; Villines, T. C.; Shaw, L. J.; Min, J. K. (2011). "Performance of the Traditional Age, Sex, and Angina Typicality-Based Approach for Estimating Pre-test Probability of Angiographically Significant Coronary Artery Disease in Patients Undergoing Coronary Computed Tomographic Angiography: Results from the Multinational CONFIRM Registry (Coronary CT Angiography Evaluation For Clinical Outcomes: An International Multicenter Registry) - PMC". Circulation. 124 (22): 2423–2432. doi:10.1161/CIRCULATIONAHA.111.039255. PMC 3240578. PMID 22025600.
- Karlsberg, R. P.; Cryer, P. E.; Roberts, R. (July 26, 1981). "Serial plasma catecholamine response early in the course of clinical acute myocardial infarction: relationship to infarct extent and mortality". American Heart Journal. 102 (1): 24–29. doi:10.1016/0002-8703(81)90408-7. PMID 7246410.
- "Effect of metoprolol CR/XL in chronic heart failure: Metoprolol CR/XL Randomised Intervention Trial in Congestive Heart Failure (MERIT-HF)". Lancet. 353 (9169): 2001–2007. June 12, 1999. doi:10.1016/S0140-6736(99)04440-2. PMID 10376614.
- Zeb, Irfan; Li, Dong; Nasir, Khurram; Malpeso, Jennifer; Batool, Aisha; Flores, Ferdinand; Dailing, Christopher; Karlsberg, Ronald P.; Budoff, Matthew (December 26, 2013). "Effect of statin treatment on coronary plaque progression - a serial coronary CT angiography study". Atherosclerosis. 231 (2): 198–204. doi:10.1016/j.atherosclerosis.2013.08.019. PMID 24267226.
- Sevag Packard, R. R.; Karlsberg, R. P. (2016). "Integrating FFRCT into Routine Clinical Practice: A Solid PLATFORM or Slippery Slope? - PMC". Journal of the American College of Cardiology. 68 (5): 446–449. doi:10.1016/j.jacc.2016.05.056. PMC 5378152. PMID 27470450.
- Aldana-Bitar, Jairo; Cho, Geoffrey W.; Anderson, Lauren; Karlsberg, Daniel W.; Manubolu, Venkat S.; Verghese, Dhiran; Hussein, Luay; Budoff, Matthew J.; Karlsberg, Ronald P. (September 1, 2023). "Artificial intelligence using a deep learning versus expert computed tomography human reading in calcium score and coronary artery calcium data and reporting system classification". Coronary Artery Disease. 34 (6): 448–452. doi:10.1097/MCA.0000000000001244. PMID 37139562.
