= David Geffen School of Medicine at UCLA =

Public medical school in Los Angeles, California, US

- Former name: UCLA School of Medicine (1951–2002)
- Motto: Fiat lux
- Motto in English: Let there be light
- Type: Public
- Established: 1951; 75 years ago
- Parent institution: University of California, Los Angeles
- Dean: Steven M. Dubinett
- Location: Los Angeles, California, United States; 34.0662°N 118.4431°W
- Campus: Urban
- Website: medschool.ucla.edu

The UCLA School of Medicine (also known as the David Geffen School of Medicine at UCLA) is the accredited medical school of the University of California, Los Angeles. Founded in 1951, it is the second medical school in the University of California system after the UCSF School of Medicine.

== History ==
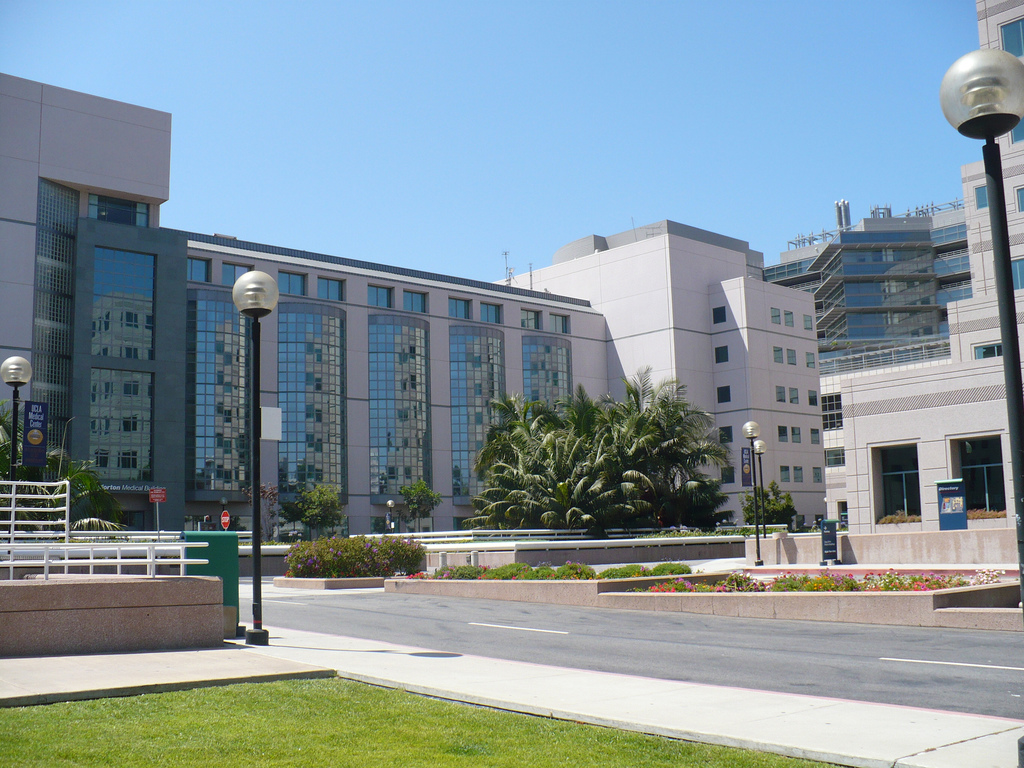
UCLA Medical Plaza is near the main entrance to the campus.

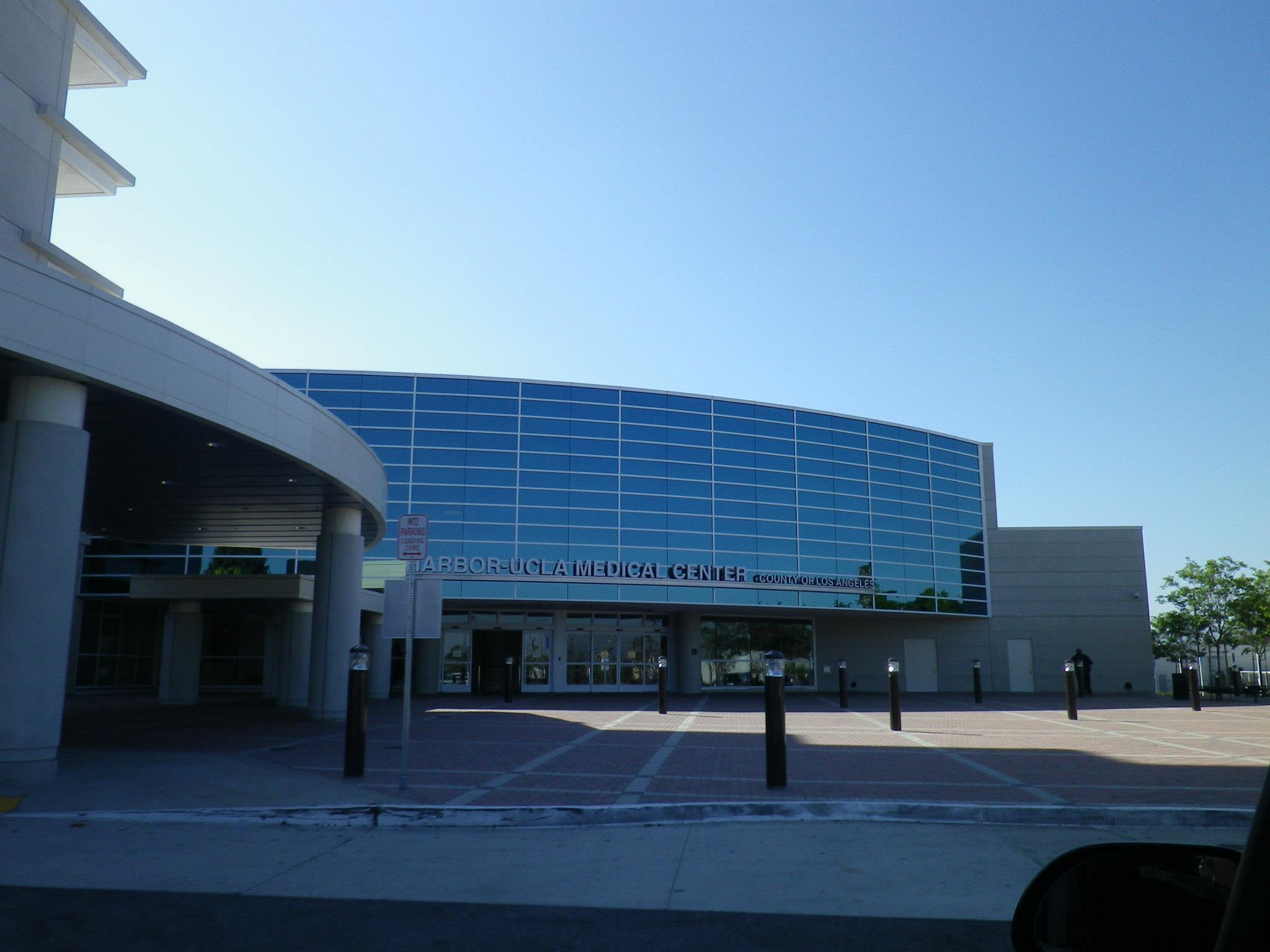
Harbor-UCLA Medical Center

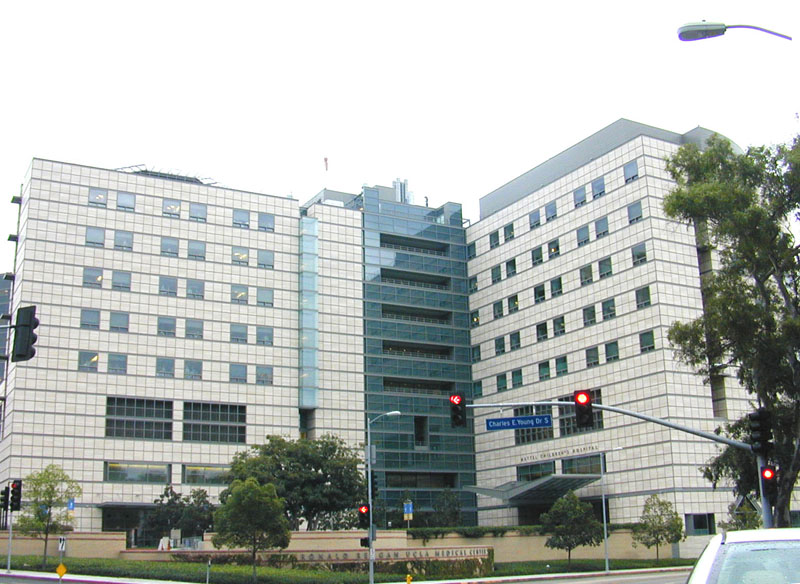
Mattel Children's Hospital entrance

=== Founding ===
Dating back to its affiliation with the University of California in 1873, the UCSF School of Medicine was the only public medical school in California. As the population of southern California boomed in the first half of the 20th century, the need for a second medical school arose. Dr. Elmer Belt was instrumental in lobbying for the establishment of the School.

The movement to start a medical school at UCLA began with Provost Clarence Addison Dykstra, who persuaded UC President Robert Gordon Sproul to appoint a committee headed by Vern Oliver Knudsen to study the issue.

On October 18, 1945, the committee presented its findings to the Regents of the University of California. At the time, there were only two medical schools in Southern California: the College of Medical Evangelists (now the School of Medicine of Loma Linda University), which rarely admitted students who were not already members of the Seventh-day Adventist Church, and USC Keck School of Medicine, which was admitting only about 70 students per year. These two were plainly inadequate to satisfy the rapidly growing Southland's need for healthcare services, with the result that two-thirds of Los Angeles doctors had been educated at medical schools elsewhere. After hearing the committee's findings, the Board of Regents immediately voted that same day to approve the creation of a medical school at UCLA. Governor Earl Warren signed Assembly Bill 35 into state law on February 19, 1946, which appropriated $7 million for the construction of a medical school building on the UCLA campus.

In 1947, Stafford L. Warren was appointed as the first dean. Warren had served on the Manhattan Project while on leave from his post at University of Rochester School of Medicine. His choice of core faculty consisted of his former associates at Rochester in Andrew Dowdy as the first professor of radiology, John Lawrence as the first professor of medicine, and Charles Carpenter as the first professor of infectious diseases. Along with William Longmire Jr., a 34-year-old surgeon from Johns Hopkins School of Medicine, the group was called the Founding Five.

The building of the medical center and the School of Medicine began in 1949. The 1951 charter class consisted of 26 men and 2 women. Initially, there were 15 faculty members, although that number had increased to 43 by 1955 when the charter class graduated. The first classes were conducted in the reception lounge of the old Religious Conference Building on Le Conte Avenue. Clinical education was initially conducted on the wards of Harbor General Hospital, which today is Harbor–UCLA Medical Center.

In July 1955, the UCLA Medical Center was opened.

=== Mellinkoff administration ===
Sherman Mellinkoff succeeded Stafford Warren as dean in 1962 and served for the next 24 years. Under Mellinkoff, the UCLA Neuropsychiatric Institute, the UCLA Brain Research Institute, and the Marion Davies Children's Center were founded. The Jules Stein Eye Institute and the Reed Neurological Research Center were established. By decade's end, UCLA had doubled the size of the medical school and the hospital. The UCLA School of Dentistry, School of Public Health, and School of Nursing were formed as well. The medical school grew to nearly 400 medical students, more than 700 interns and residents, and almost 200 master's and doctorate candidates.

A partnership was formed with the Charles R. Drew University of Medicine and Science in 1966 to train medical students with the goal of meeting the needs of the underserved in South Los Angeles.

The school continued its growth in the 1970s, becoming affiliated with VA facilities as well as Olive View–UCLA Medical Center. In 1974, the school co-founded the Biomedical Sciences Program with UC Riverside, which offers 24 students each year the opportunity to earn both the B.S. and M.D. degrees in seven years instead of the traditional eight.

1981 saw the dedication of the Doris and Louis Factor Health Sciences Building which houses the School of Nursing and Jonsson Comprehensive Cancer Center. In 1987, construction began on UCLA Medical Plaza, an outpatient facility located across the street from the main hospital.

=== Post-Mellinkoff era ===
Kenneth I. Shine succeeded Sherman Mellinkoff as dean in 1986. In 1992 Shine left UCLA to become President of the Institute of Medicine in Washington, D.C. Gerald S. Levey was then appointed provost of medical sciences and dean of the medical school in 1994. Levey oversaw expansion of interdisciplinary research and the establishment of a Department of Human Genetics. The Gonda (Goldschmied) Neuroscience and Genetics Research Center, as well as the Ronald Reagan UCLA Medical Center, were constructed. In October 2008, Levey announced that he would be stepping down from the position of Dean in 2009.

The UCLA School of Medicine was renamed "David Geffen School of Medicine at UCLA" in 2002 in honor of media mogul David Geffen, who donated $200 million in unrestricted funds.

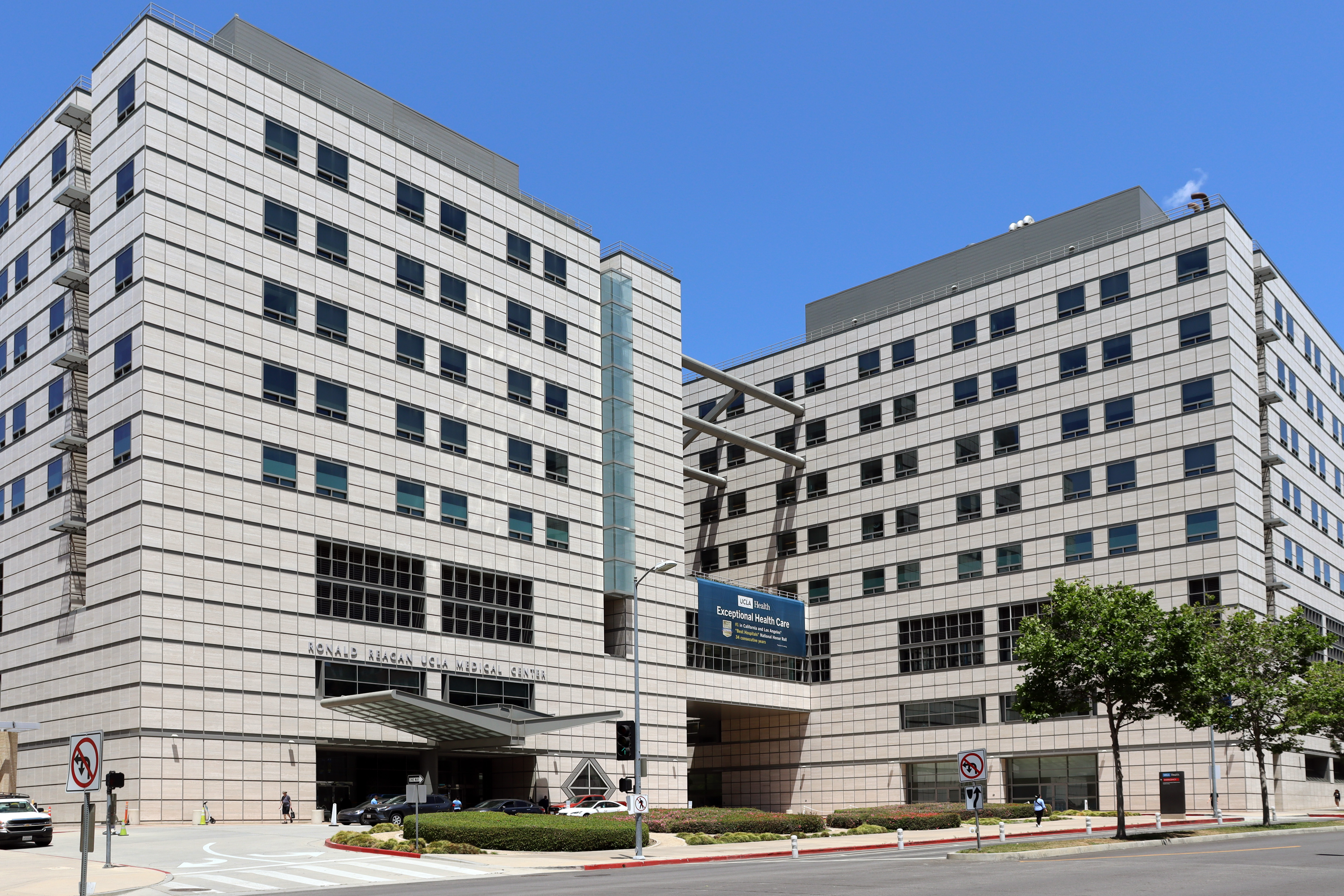
Ronald Reagan UCLA Medical Center

Effective February 2010, A. Eugene Washington was appointed Dean of the UCLA School of Medicine and Vice-Chancellor of Health Sciences at UCLA. Washington, a clinician, academician, researcher, and university administrator, was recruited from UCSF, where he served as Vice-Chancellor and Provost, as well as Professor of gynecology, epidemiology, and health policy. Washington is the first African-American to hold these leadership posts at UCLA.

UCLA constructed the Ronald Reagan UCLA Medical Center across the street from the original facility to comply with the California earthquake law. The 1,050,000-square-foot (98,000 m^{2}) hospital is named after the late President of the United States and Governor of California, Ronald Reagan. It was designed by architect I.M. Pei. Patients were transferred there from the existing hospital in June 2008.

In the rankings released for 2024, U.S. News & World Report ranked David Geffen School of Medicine at UCLA as Tier 1 in the U.S. in research and ranked UCLA Medical Center at No. 5.

== Affiliated hospitals ==
Notable hospitals and Medical Centers affiliated with UCLA David Geffen School of Medicine are:

- Cedars-Sinai Medical Center: The best hospital in California and the west coast, and 2nd best hospital in the United States as per U.S. News & World Report 2022-23 rankings.
- UCLA Medical Center: The 2nd best hospital in California and the west coast, and 5th best hospital in the United States as per U.S. News & World Report 2022-23 rankings.
- Harbor-UCLA Medical Center: Previously known as Los Angeles County Harbor General Hospital; first hospital affiliated with the medical school (since its founding in 1951).
- West LA VA Medical Center
- St. Mary Medical Center
- Kaiser Permanente- Sunset
- Kaiser Permanente- Woodland Hills

== Summer programs ==
The David Geffen School of Medicine at UCLA accepts applications for summer academic enrichment programs. These programs include the Premedical/Predental Enrichment Program (PREP), Summer Medical Dental Education Program (SMDEP), and the Re-Application Post baccalaureate Program (RAP). Application deadlines are March 1 for the PREP and SMDEP programs, while the RAP program has a deadline of May 15.

== Notable faculty ==
- Ryan Abbott, Adjunct Assistant Professor of Medicine
- Arie S. Belldegrun, FACS; a director of the UCLA Institute of Urologic Oncology; Professor and Chief of Urologic Oncology at the David Geffen School of Medicine; holds the Roy and Carol Doumani Chair in Urologic Oncology; Clinical Director of the UCLA Prostate Disease Research Program; Surgical Director of the UCLA Kidney Cancer Program
- Selma Calmes, co-founder of the Anesthesia History Association, former vice-chair of the department of anesthesiology
- Timothy Cloughesy
- Michelle Craske
- Bruce Dobkin, director of neurological rehabilitation and editor-in-chief of the journal Neurorehabilitation and Neural Repair
- Patrick Dowling, Chairman of the Department of Family Medicine at the David Geffen School of Medicine; co-founder and co-director of the UCLA IMG Program (for International medical graduate); given the title of NHSC Ambassador by the National Health Service Corps
- David Eisenberg
- David Fish, physiatrist, editor of a popular PM&R handbook, PM&R Pocketpedia
- Robert Peter Gale FACP, FRSM, expert in leukemia therapy and bone marrow transplants; helped the Soviet Union and Japanese governments mitigate the Chernobyl and Fukushima nuclear power faculty accidents
- Daniel Geschwind
- Michael Gottlieb, one of the first physicians to report a case of AIDS
- Steve Horvath
- Elaine Hsiao
- Louis Ignarro, 1998 Nobel Prize in Physiology/Medicine
- Ronald P. Karlsberg, clinical professor of medicine
- Baljit S. Khakh
- Babak Larian, assistant clinical professor of surgery, otolaryngology
- Linda Liau, W. Eugene Stern Chair of the Department of Neurosurgery
- Sherman Mellinkoff, second dean of the UCLA School of Medicine
- Bengt O. Muthén
- Nicholas Lowe, Professor of Dermatology
- Susan Perlman, Professor in the Department of Neurology
- Michael E. Phelps, one of the inventors of the positron emission tomography (PET) scanner; chairman and Norton Simon Professor of the Department of Molecular and Medical Pharmacology; director of the Crump Institute for Molecular Imaging
- Joshua Prager, president of North American Neuromodulation Society
- Antoni Ribas
- Leonard H. Rome
- Marc A. Suchard
- Alfredo Sadun, Flora L. Thornton Endowed Chair at Doheny Eye Centers-UCLA
- Jeffrey L. Saver, Professor of Neurology
- Alcino J. Silva, Professor of Neurobiology, Psychiatry, and Psychology; pioneer in the field of molecular and cellular cognition of memory
- Maie St. John
- Jeffery H. Miller, Professor of Microbiology, Immunology, and Molecular Genetics; pioneer in DNA repair and mutagenesis.

== See also ==
- David Geffen
- UCLA Health
- University of California, Los Angeles
