= James M. Heaps =

American former obstetrician-gynecologist convicted of sexual assault

James M. Heaps is a former UCLA Health obstetrician-gynecologist who faced criminal charges and civil lawsuits alleging he sexually assaulted and harassed patients during medical appointments. Heaps practiced medicine for over 30 years before he retired from UCLA Health in June 2018. In May 22, 2019, the Los Angeles County District Attorney's office charged Heaps with two felony counts of sexual battery by fraud and one felony count of sexual exploitation involving two former patients.

He was found guilty in October 2022 of three counts of sexual battery by fraud and two counts of sexual penetration of an unconscious person.

== Education and career ==
Starting in February 2014, Heaps was employed at UCLA Health. In 2016, he was one of the highest paid University of California employees, with an annual seven-figure salary. In June 2018, UCLA announced Heaps's immediate retirement in a letter to patients.

== Allegations of sexual assault and harassment ==
In 2014, Heaps was investigated by the state medical board as well as UCLA following a complaint. A 2015 Yelp review alleged that Heaps inappropriately touched a patient's breast. UCLA Health acknowledged publicly that medical system officials were aware of the 2015 Yelp review but did not reach out to the victim or inform police. In December 2017, following a complaint from a patient, UCLA opened a Title IX investigation into Heaps. UCLA allowed Heaps to continue seeing patients for six more months.

In June 2018, UCLA sent a letter to patients announcing with “mixed emotions” that Heaps was retiring. A year later, on May 22, 2019, Heaps was charged by the Los Angeles County District Attorney's office. Heaps surrendered to law enforcement and was released on his own recognizance.

=== UCLA response ===
In December 2017, following a complaint from a patient, UCLA opened a Title IX investigation into Heaps's alleged misconduct, which took two years to complete. The report concluded that an exam he conducted “amounted to sexual assault and harassment.” Once criminal charges were filed, UCLA dedicated a page on its website with information on Heaps's investigation and allegations along with other resources for patients. UCLA tracks the number of individuals who have contacted them about Heaps, and whether those individuals have expressed support or concern about their interactions with Heaps. UCLA reached a $2.25 million settlement with one patient in June 2019, as well as a separate $1.3 million settlement in March 2019 to settle her complaint that Heaps committed sexual harassment and retaliated against her for participating in an investigation about him. On 8 February 2022 the University of California reached an agreement with 203 women who alleged they were abused by Heaps. To settle their claims the University will pay more than $240 million.
