= Jeffrey L. Saver =

Jeffrey L. Saver is an American neurologist who is the Carol and James Collins Distinguished Professor of Neurology at the David Geffen School of Medicine, University of California, Los Angeles.

== Early life and education ==
Saver received his A.B. degree at Harvard College (1981), where he studied biochemical sciences and philosophy, and his M.D degree from Harvard Medical School (1986). Upon earning his medical degree, Saver completed a neurology residency at the Harvard-Longwood Program, and fellowships in Behavioral and Cognitive Neurology at the University of Iowa and Vascular Neurology at Brown University.

== Career ==
Saver's academic career is marked by his association with the University of California, Los Angeles (UCLA), joining the faculty in 1994.He was founding Director of the UCLA Stroke Center and currently directs the UCLA NeuroTranslational Research Center.

Internationally, he has served in leadership roles in the Virtual International Stroke Trials Archive (VISTA), the World Stroke Organization, and the International Classification of Diseases Neurosciences Division.

== Research ==
Saver has made research contributions to acute stroke treatment, stroke prevention, neuroimaging, clinical trial design, and neurocognitive consequences of stroke. In the acute stroke domain, Saver led/co-led the development of clot retrieval therapy for stroke from its invention at UCLA the early 2000s through the pivotal breakthrough trials of 2015. This highly effective treatment is now used worldwide. His group also pioneered several aspects of prehospital treatment of stroke, including developing tools for paramedic identification of stroke, characterization of stroke severity, initiation of treatment within minutes of onset. He also heightened recognition of stroke as an emergency condition by determining that the human brain loses 2 million nerve cells a minute during an ischemic stroke.

In stroke prevention, Saver co-led the US trial of devices to prevent strokes by closing patent foramen ovale, an open channel in the upper chambers of the heart. Closure device are the first effective therapy for this cause of 5% of all ischemic strokes. Also, his group developed the Stroke PROTECT program that served as a basis for the US national Get with the Guidelines – Stroke US quality of care registry.

== Honors and awards ==
Saver received the American Heart/Stroke Association's Stroke Council Award in 2006 and Distinguished Scientist Award in 2015 and the World Stroke Organization Research Award for lifetime contributions in 2018. He is an Honorary Fellow/Life Member of the European Stroke Organization, the Stroke Society of the Australasia, and the Royal College of Physicians of Thailand.
