= David Fish =

American psychiatrist

- Born: November 28, 1964 (age 61)
- Education: University of California at Berkeley; New York Medical College
- Occupation: physiatrist

David Eli Fish is an American physiatrist and one of the editors of a popular PM&R handbook PM&R Pocketpedia.

== Education ==
After completing a residency in physical medicine and rehabilitation at the Johns Hopkins University School of Medicine in 2001, Fish completed additional training as a clinical fellow in pain medicine at UCLA School of Medicine. Fish is a Professor in the Orthopaedic Department Clinic at UCLA School of Medicine.

== Awards ==
Fish is the recipient of the following:

- Foundation for PM&R Education Research Fund's Best Paper Award (2004).
  - Fish's work demonstrated that there is no statistically significant difference between two competing approaches to achieve muscle strengthening.
- Distinguished Clinician (2002), UCLA/VA Multicampus PM&R Residency Program
  - Selected by residents as the distinguished staff attending for the academic year.
- Teaching Excellence in Problem Based Learning, UCLA School of Medicine (2007)

== Articles ==
- Fish DE, Radfar-Baublitz L, Choi H, Felsenthal G (2003). "Correlation of standardized testing results with success on the 2001 American Board of Physical Medicine and Rehabilitation Part 1 Board Certificate Examination". Arch Phys Med Rehabil. 82 (9): 686–91. doi:10.1097/01.PHM.0000083688.23340.EA. PMID 12960910. S2CID 6608392.
- Fish DE, Krabak BJ, Johnson-Greene DJ, deLateur BJ (2003). "Optimal Resistance Training: Comparison of the DeLorme and Oxford Technique". Am J Phys Med Rehabil. 82 (12): 903–909. doi:10.1097/01.PHM.0000098505.57264.DB. PMID 14627926. S2CID 45365706.

== Books ==
- Choi H, Sugar R, Fish D, Shatzer M, Krabak B. PM&R Pocketpedia. Lippincott Williams and Wilkins (2003). ISBN 0-7817-4433-4
- Kim H, Fish D, Choi H. Pain Medicine Pocketpedia. Lippincott Williams and Wilkins (2011). ISBN 978-0-7817-7218-1
