= Sherman Mellinkoff =

American physician and gastroenterologist

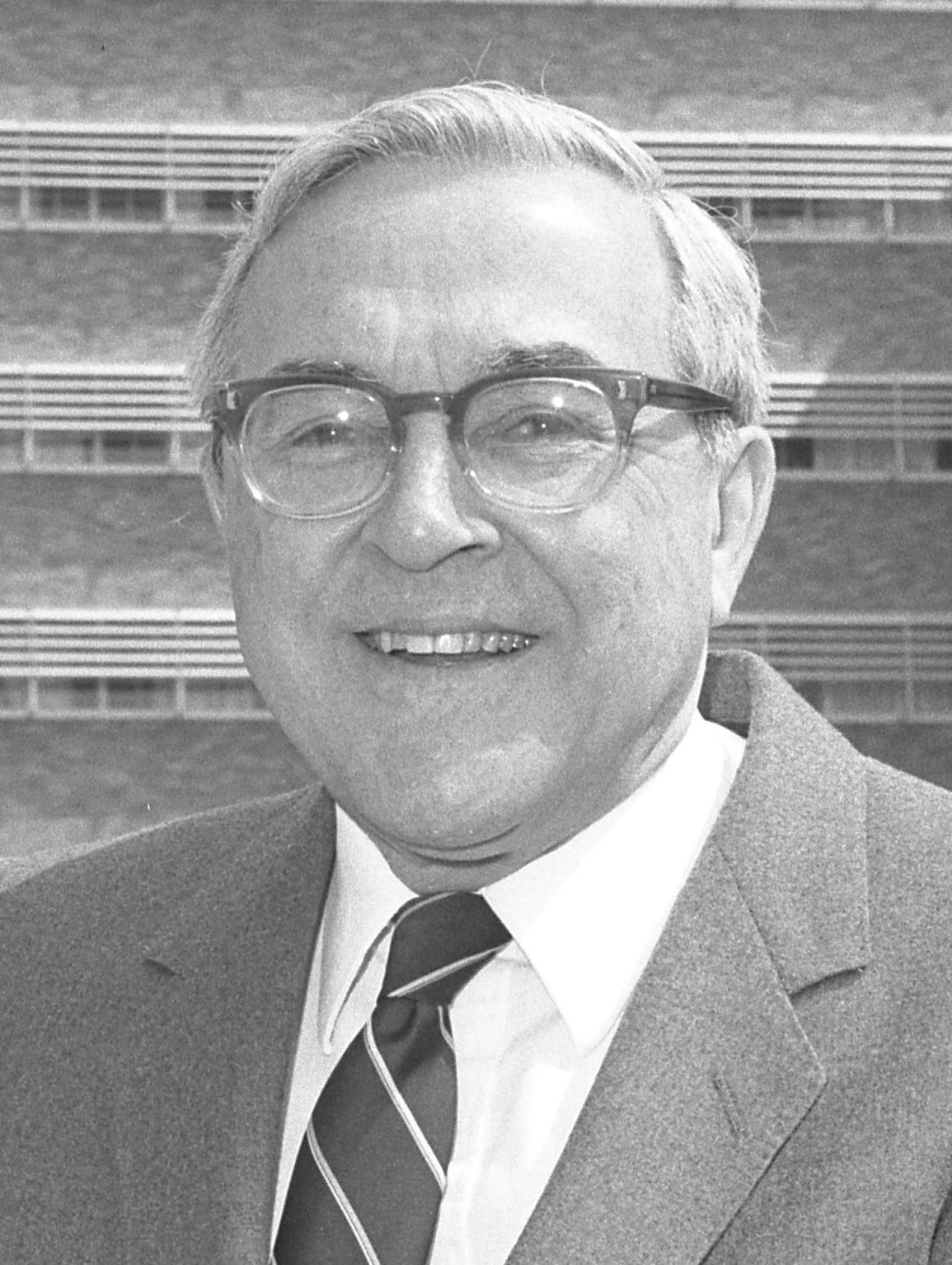
Mellinkoff in 1986.

Sherman Mussoff Mellinkoff (March 23, 1920 – July 17, 2016) was an American physician and gastroenterologist. He was the second dean of the School of Medicine at the University of California, Los Angeles, serving from 1962 to 1986.

== Early life and education ==
Mellinkoff was born in McKeesport, Pennsylvania, the son of Albert and Helen Mellinkoff, who were Ashkenazi Jews of Russian-Polish descent. When he was a baby the family moved to Los Angeles, California, and Albert opened and operated a shoe store. Sherman attended Beverly Hills High School, where he was a top debater and was elected student body president. In his senior year he developed an interest in medicine and went to Stanford University as a pre-medical student. He graduated in 1941 and enrolled in the university's medical school. He served in the United States Army Medical Corps for two years becoming a captain. He then took an internal medicine residency at Johns Hopkins University and a gastroenterology fellowship at the University of Pennsylvania, returning to Hopkins as chief resident in 1951.

== Career ==
He served on the Hopkins faculty until 1953 and was then hired as chief of the gastroenterology division at the 2-year-old UCLA School of Medicine. In 1962 he was appointed by UCLA Chancellor Franklin Murphy as the medical school's second dean. During his 24-year tenure - among the longest tenures of any medical school dean in the country - the school grew from 28 students to 650 and its faculty quadrupled. He led the school to early adoption of organ transplant surgery including renal, bone marrow, heart, and liver transplantation. UCLA was one of the first schools with a federally funded positron emission tomography (PET) research facility. He oversaw the development of multiple new facilities including a comprehensive cancer center, the UCLA Neuropsychiatric Institute, the Jules Stein Eye Institute, the Brain Research Institute, the Reed Neurological Research Center, the Marion Davies Children's Center, and the Doris and Louis Factor Health Sciences Building. The medical school expanded to include schools of dentistry, public health, and nursing. He partnered with multiple Los Angeles-area hospitals and clinics so that the medical students could do clinical rotations as part of their training. He retired as dean in 1986 and took a year off to travel, then returned to the university as an endowed professor of medicine.

== Recognition ==
He was a member of the National Academy of Sciences and the American Academy of Arts and Sciences, as well as a Fellow of the Royal College of Physicians.

In 1979 the university established the Sherman Mellinkoff Faculty Award, considered to be the highest faculty honor at the school of medicine.

== Personal life ==
In 1944 while in medical school, he married June O’Connell, a nurse; the couple had three children. He died at the age of 96 at his home near the UCLA campus. His lifelong special interests included classical literature, history, and baseball; friends noted that his conversation could include quotations from Ecclesiastes, James Thurber, Winston Churchill, and Nolan Ryan, sometimes in the same sentence.
