= UCLA Health =

Healthcare network in California, United States

- Type: Healthcare provider
- Headquarters: Los Angeles, California
- Services: 5 hospitals
- Vice Chancellor: John Mazziotta
- President: Johnese Spisso
- Parent organization: University of California, Los Angeles
- Website: uclahealth.org

UCLA Health is the public healthcare system affiliated with the University of California, Los Angeles, located in Los Angeles, California. It comprises a number of hospitals, UCLA School of Medicine, and an extensive primary care network in the Los Angeles region.

In 2007, UCLA Health founded Operation Mend, a program for treating military veterans who were wounded in wars in Iraq and Afghanistan. In 2016 Operation Mend received a grant from the Wounded Warrior Project to expand its offering to include PTSD treatment and became part of the Warrior Care Network.

A 2013 report by the California State Auditor has suggested that the financial transactions from the health system to the medical school, which have grown threefold over the reporting period, deserve more transparency. A study by the Rand Corporation about leadership structures at UCLA Health again addresses the ambiguous position of UCLA Health as both an academic and a commercial entity. More recently, the UCOP has scheduled a bylaw amendment for the Committee on Health Services with a view to changing the composition of the leadership structure to enable the UCLA Health System (then so-called) to compete and collaborate more effectively in the health services marketplace.

The governance structure includes a non-fiduciary Board of Overseers and a Community Engagement Committee that is made up of faculty and staff and reports to the Vice Chancellor, Health Sciences. In addition, there is a UCLA Health Sustainability Steering Committee.

Budgetary information for bondholders (2013) and the 2014–2015 Financial Report are available through the University of California Office of the President.

In March 2024, it was announced UCLA Health had completed the acquisition of West Hills Hospital and Medical Center and related assets in Los Angeles, California from the Nashville-headquartered healthcare provider, HCA Healthcare, for an undisclosed amount. The facility was renamed UCLA West Valley Medical Center.

== Hospitals ==
- Ronald Reagan UCLA Medical Center
- UCLA Medical Center, Santa Monica
- Resnick Neuropsychiatric Hospital at UCLA
- Mattel Children's Hospital UCLA
- Jonsson Comprehensive Cancer Center
- UCLA West Valley Medical Center

== Other entities ==
- The David Geffen School of Medicine at UCLA is an accredited medical school located in Los Angeles, California, United States. The school was renamed in 2001 in honor of media mogul David Geffen who donated $200 million in unrestricted funds.
- UCLA Faculty Practice Group, a system of more than 1,200 full-time clinical faculty physicians, who work in primary-care and specialty-care offices throughout the Greater Los Angeles Area
- UCLA Health Training Center, an arena and a training center for the Los Angeles Lakers
- Tiverton House, a 100-room hotel facility for patients and their families

== See also ==
- James M. Heaps
