= Nicholas Lowe =

British dermatologist (born 1944)

- Born: July 10, 1944 (age 82); England
- Education: University of Liverpool
- Occupation: Dermatologist
- Title: Clinical Professor of Dermatology

Nicholas J Lowe (born 10 July 1944) is an English dermatologist who has published research into skin pharmacology, botulinum toxins, injectable filler and Lasers in cutaneous and cosmetic Surgery.

He was president of the British Cosmetic Dermatology Group from 2013 to 2015. He is a clinical professor of dermatology at UCLA School of Medicine, Los Angeles. He is a Fellow of the Royal College of Physicians, American Academy of Dermatology and American Society of Laser Medicine and Surgery.

== Education ==
Lowe graduated from University of Liverpool School of Medicine, England, in 1968. In 1975, he was awarded a Research Fellowship at the Scripps Research Institute where he worked with Professor Richard Stoughton, in skin pharmacology and percutaneous absorption. His doctoral MD research thesis described mechanisms and control of excessive epidermal cell growth.

In 1975, as a professor of dermatology at University of Wisconsin, he performed research on how ultraviolet light damages the skin and contributes to skin cancers. He was subsequently appointed to Professor of Dermatology at David Geffen School of Medicine at UCLA, Los Angeles, California, United States.

== Research ==
In 1980, he founded the largest psoriasis therapy centre in Southern California, the Dermatology Institute and Skin Care Center, where he also conducted some of the first research studies on vitamin A derivatives for psoriasis, acne and other disfiguring skin diseases. He was appointed to the Medical Advisory Board of the National Psoriasis Foundation in the US.

In the 1980s, he conducted one of the first clinical research studies in psoriasis a completely new category of drugs for the treatment of psoriasis known as biologic drugs. These were drugs that were capable of targeting immunologic defects in psoriasis; new generations of these biological drugs are now used worldwide as biologic therapy for psoriasis, arthritis and related diseases.

In 1980, he performed research on a category of the first new sunscreens that protected from long wave ultraviolet (or UVA) and UVB. He also confirmed that UVA was responsible for skin aging, skin cancer, unwanted pigmentation and skin sagging and during this research period he also proved the protectiveness of sunscreens against UVA damage in human studies.

In the 1990s, he published research on the use of ultra-pulsed carbon dioxide lasers in dermatology, which were developed and used to reduce skin aging, skin sagging, wrinkling and improve disfiguring scars.

Lowe was the lead investigator in the first placebo control study of Botox for reducing forehead frown lines. At this time neither the dose nor was the safety of Botox was known. Lowe described the how to measure the improvement and using muscle recording electrodes and found the correct muscles to inject Botox. Together with dermatologist Dr Alastair Carruthers, he presented their early studies on the aesthetic use of Botox at the American Academy of Dermatology symposium. He has also shown that Botox injections are an effective way of reducing and controlling the sweating for long periods of time. Pivotal publications on this include a British Medical Journal paper.

== Awards ==
- 1979 and 1984 American Academy of Dermatology Gold Award for Scientific Exhibits
- 1988 Elected to American Dermatological Association
- 1990 President, Pacific Dermatologic Association
- 1999 Clinical Professor “Emeritus” for ten years’ service to the Division of Dermatology, David Geffen School of Medicine at UCLA, Los Angeles, California, USA
- 2005 Commemorative of 25th year of membership of the American Academy of Dermatology

== Research Publications and Resources ==
Dr Lowe has written over 450 clinical and research papers and 19 books, sits on the editorial board of scientific journals and is a founding editor of the Journal of Cutaneous Laser Therapy.

Books for the general public:

- 1993 Managing Your Psoriasis
- 1999 Skin Secrets: The Medical Facts Versus The Beauty Fiction
- 2005 Away with Wrinkles: A Top Dermatologist's Secrets for a Younger Face
- 2007 The Wrinkle Revolution: Everywoman's Guide to a Younger Looking Skin
- 2016 Perfectly Clear, The Perfect Guide to Clear Skin

Published medical books in chronological order are:

- 1984-89 Models in Dermatology, Vol. I-IV Karger Publications
- 1989 Nonsteroidal Anti-inflammatory Agents, by Karger Publications
- 1990 Sunscreens: Development, Evaluation and Usage, Marcel Dekker; 2nd ed. 1996
- 1991 Sunscreens: A Physicians Guide. Marcel Dekker
- 1992 Practical Psoriasis Therapy, 2nd Edition, Mosby YearBook, New York.
- 1993 Managing Your Psoriasis, Master Media, New York
- 1995 Retinoids for the Clinician, Martin Dunitz, London;2nd ed., 1997
- 2000 Lasers in Cutaneous and Costmetic Surgery, Churchill Livingstone, NY, London.
- 2001 Facial Rejuvenation: Combination Minimally Invasive Treatments, Martin Dunitz, London
- 2003 Botox: Aesthetic Conditions
- 2003 Psoriasis - A Patient Guide, Martin Dunitz, London 3rd edition. Highly commended, BMA Medical Book Competition 2004
