= Susan Perlman =

American neurologist

Susan Perlman (1949-2026) was a Professor in the Department of Neurology at the David Geffen School of Medicine at UCLA. She was also Director of Ataxia and Neurogenetics Program and Post-polio Program at that school. She had long been the primary investigator for Friedreich's ataxia trials and sat on the Medical Advisory Board of the National Ataxia Foundation.

== Early career ==
Perlman received her B.S. in Biochemistry in 1971 from Cornell University and her MD in 1975 from S.U.N.Y. Stony Brook. She did her Residency in Neurology at UCLA 1976-1979 followed by a two-year Muscular Dystrophy Association Fellowship in Neurology also at UCLA.

== Areas of specialism ==
After finishing her training in general neurology, Dr Perlman began specialty work in chronic diseases of the neuromuscular system (muscular dystrophy, spinal cord diseases, cerebral palsy).

She set up a multidisciplinary clinic, bringing together neurologists with psychologists, social workers, and therapists; the aim being to link diagnosis, rehabilitation and treatment, with clinical research into causes and treatments. Doctor Perlman set up a separate clinic for post-polio syndrome, to teach the basics of post-polio to neurology and rehabilitation residents; the clinic sees about 200 patients a year, for evaluation and treatment.

She has clinical interests in liver transplantation and neuro-genetics.

== Honours and awards ==
On May 30, 2008, Dr. Perlman was presented with the Sherman M. Mellinkoff Faculty Award at the Hippocratic Oath ceremony of the graduating class of 2008. The award is considered the highest faculty distinction at the David Geffen School of Medicine
