= Imagining the Elephant =

Book by Allan MacLeod Cormack

- Author: Christopher Kit Vaughan
- Language: English
- Genre: Biography
- Publisher: Imperial College Press
- Publication date: 31-Jul-2008
- Publication place: South Africa
- Media type: Print
- Pages: 304
- ISBN: 978-1-86094-988-3

Imagining the Elephant: A Biography of Allan MacLeod Cormack is a 2008 biography of physicist and Nobel laureate Allan MacLeod Cormack written by biomedical engineer and author Christopher Kit Vaughan and published by Imperial College Press. The book won the University of Cape Town Book Award in 2010, an honour shared with Nobel laureate J. M. Coetzee who won the award in 1984 for Waiting for the Barbarians.

Cormack shared the Nobel Prize in Physiology or Medicine in 1979 with Godfrey Hounsfield “for the development of computer assisted tomography.” The book's title is inspired by the parable of six blind men and an elephant, in which the men, by approaching the animal from different angles, imagine it to be an elephant. This is analogous to computed tomography – or CT scan – in which a series of two-dimensional X-rays taken from different angles are used to construct a three-dimensional image of the object.

== Overview ==
The book is divided into nine chapters: (1) From John O'Groats to Jo'burg; (2) On the Slopes of Table Mountain; (3) Physics and Friends at Cambridge; (4) Return to the Fairest Cape; (5) A New Beginning in Boston; (6) Finding Radon and His Transform; (7) On the Road to Stockholm; (8) Citizen of the World; and (9) At Home in Massachusetts. In addition, there are five appendices: (A) Allan Cormack's Publications; (B) Nobel Lecture; (C) Presentation of Nobel Prize; (D) Man and Science in the 21st Century; and (E) A Teenager's Odyssey. Appendix D is an essay written by Cormack for The Mainichi Newspapers, while Appendix E is a mini-biography with cartoons written for The Weekly Shonen Jump, a magazine for teenagers. Neither of these essays, which were originally published in Japanese, had previously been published in English.

== Reviews ==
Writing in The New England Journal of Medicine, Reginald Greene commented: “Those interested in the history of science are indebted to Vaughan for producing this wonderful biography of Allan Cormack and for creating an expert and vivid description of one of the two streams of discovery that led to the invention of computed tomography.” Robin Cherry, who was one of Cormack's students in the early 1950s, said: “A prodigious effort has gone into this book, and the result is a comprehensive work of reference which will be a valuable source for those interested in the history of science and medicine.”

== See also ==
- American Prometheus: The Triumph and Tragedy of J. Robert Oppenheimer
