= Michelle Bholat =

American physician

- Born: 1958 (age 67–68)
- Occupation: physician

Michelle Bholat (born 1958) is an American physician. For more than two decades, she was faculty in the Department of Family Medicine at the University of California, Los Angeles, where she served in multiple leadership roles including as vice-chair of clinical affairs. She was a member of the Medical Board of California from 2015-2019, appointed by Governor Jerry Brown, and then again from 2022-2026, appointed by Governor Gavin Newsom. Since November 2024, she has been chair of the Department of Family Medicine at University of California, Riverside.

== Life ==
Bholat was born in Los Angeles in 1958. She received a bachelor's degree in biological science from California State University in 1987, her M.D. at the University of California, Irvine, in 1992, and her M.P.H. in health care policy at the University of California, Los Angeles in 1997.

== Career ==
Bholat earned the title of vice-chair of the Department of Family Medicine at the David Geffen School of Medicine at UCLA, making her the first Latina to be appointed to this role. In this position, she worked to hire and develop the careers of physicians from disadvantaged backgrounds as well as collaborate with and train physicians from Mexico and other Spanish-speaking countries, with the aim of providing culturally and linguistically competent medical care to underserved communities in California.

In 2006 Bholat co-founded the International Medical Graduate Program (IMG) with Patrick Dowling at the University of California Los Angeles, a program designed to help Latino immigrant doctors seeking medical certification in the United States. As of 2017 the program had helped 66 Latino doctors to integrate into the California medical community. The program was discontinued in 2024.

== Awards and appointments ==
Bholat's work to incorporate compassion and cultural sensitivity into medicine has earned her the Los Angeles County Department of Health Services Recognition of Service Award, as well as a fellowship with the National Hispanic Medical Association. In 2014 she received the Yancey award from the MLK community Health Foundation.

As of 2017 Bholat was an appointed member of the Medical Board of California. In 2015 she was elected to the board of directors of the Beach Cities Health District.
