= Philip E. Cryer =

American endocrinologist

- Born: January 5, 1940; El Paso, Illinois, United States
- Died: February 24, 2024 (aged 84); St. Louis, Missouri, United States
- Education: Northwestern University
- Known for: Catecholamine physiology, glucose counter-regulation, hypoglycemia-associated autonomic failure
- Awards: Banting Medal for Scientific Achievement (1998); Claude Bernard Medal from European Association for the Study of Diabetes
- Scientific career
- Fields: endocrinology, metabolism, diabetes research
- Workplaces: Washington University in St. Louis

Philip E. Cryer (1940 – 2024) was an American endocrinologist and physician-scientist known for his research on catecholamine physiology, glucose counter-regulation, and hypoglycemia-associated autonomic failure (HAAF), also known as Cryer Syndrome, in diabetes. He spent his career at Washington University School of Medicine where he directed both the Division of Endocrinology, Metabolism & Lipid Research and the General Clinical Research Center.

== Early life and education ==
Philip Cryer was born on January 5, 1940 and grew up in El Paso, Illinois. His father was a physician. He completed his undergraduate education at Northwestern University (Phi Beta Kappa in 1962, and completed his medical degree at Northwestern's medical school (with Alpha Omega honors) in 1965. He completed residency and endocrinology fellowship training at Washington University School of Medicine and joined its faculty in 1971.

== Research career ==
At Washington University, Cryer developed a highly sensitive single-isotope derivative method for measuring catecholamines (epinephrine and norepinephrine) in human plasma, improving the study of the human sympathoadrenal system. Using this assay, he and cardiology collaborators at Washington University examined catecholamine release during acute myocardial infarction, showing that elevated plasma catecholamines correlated with infarct size and mortality.

Cryer later shifted focus to the physiology of glucose counter-regulation—how hormonal responses restore blood glucose during hypoglycemia—and discovered that repeated hypoglycemia blunts this defense. He coined the term hypoglycemia-associated autonomic failure (HAAF) to describe this condition.

== Leadership and service ==
Cryer served as Director of the General Clinical Research Center (1973–2006) and the Division of Endocrinology, Diabetes & Metabolism (1985–2002) at Washington University. He was President of the American Diabetes Association (1992–1993).

== Death ==
Cryer died on February 24, 2024 at age 84 in St. Louis, Missouri.

== Honors ==
- Banting Medal, awarded to Cryer in 1994 by the American Diabetes Association for his work on hypoglycemia and glucose counter regulation
- Claude Bernard Medal / Prize, awarded by the European Association for the Study of Diabetes
- Kellion Award, awarded by the Australian Diabetes Society
- Albert Renold Award, awarded to Cryer by the American Diabetes Association in 2010 for his mentorship efforts
- David Rumbaugh Scientific Award, awarded to Cryer by the Juvenile Diabetes Research Foundation
- William H. Rorer Clinical Investigator Award, awarded by The Endocrine Society
- Honorary Doctorate from the University of Copenhagen

== Personal life ==
Cryer was married to Carolyn Elizabeth Havlin-Cryer until her death. She died on April 23, 2023, at the age of 80, in Saint Louis, Missouri.

== Selected publications ==
- Cryer, Philip E.; Santiago, Julio V.; Shah, Suresh (1974-12-01). "Measurement of Norepinephrine and Epinephrine in Small Volumes of Human Plasma by a Single Isotope Derivative Method: Response to the Upright Posture". The Journal of Clinical Endocrinology & Metabolism. 39 (6): 1025–1029. doi:10.1210/jcem-39-6-1025. PMID 4473459.
- Karlsberg R. P., Cryer P. E., Roberts R. (1981). "Serial plasma catecholamine response early in acute myocardial infarction.” American Heart Journal 102 (1): 24–31. doi:10.1016/0002-8703(81)90408-7.
- Cryer P. E. (2005). “Hypoglycemia-associated autonomic failure in diabetes.” Diabetes 54 (12): 3592–3601. doi:10.2337/diabetes.54.12.3592.
- Cryer P. E. (2013). “Mechanisms of hypoglycemia-associated autonomic failure in diabetes.” New England Journal of Medicine 369 (4): 362–372. doi:10.1056/NEJMra1215228.
