= Timothy Cloughesy =

American neurologist

Professor Timothy Frances Cloughesy
- Education: MD BA Degree with Honours in chemistry
- Alma mater: Tulane University School of Medicine

Timothy Frances Cloughesy is a professor of Clinical Neurology and director of the Neuro-Oncology Program at the University of California, Los Angeles. He is an expert on the treatment of brain cancer.

He completed his MD at Tulane University School of Medicine in 1987 and BA degree with Honors in Chemistry in 1983 at University of California, Santa Barbara. He has an h-index of 119. He served on the Scientific Advisory Board of Break Through Cancer from 2021 to 2023.
