= Developmental Medicine & Child Neurology =

Developmental Medicine and Child Neurology
- Discipline: Pediatric neurology
- Language: English
- Edited by: Bernard Dan

Publication details
- History: 1958-present
- Publisher: Mac Keith Press (UK)
- Frequency: Monthly
- Open access: hybrid journal
- Impact factor: 5.449 (2020)

Standard abbreviations
- ISO 4: Dev. Med. Child Neurol.

Indexing
- ISSN: 0012-1622 (print); 1469-8749 (web)
- OCLC no.: 783832820

Links
- Journal homepage; Online access; Online archive

Developmental Medicine and Child Neurology is a monthly peer-reviewed medical journal covering pediatric neurology and developmental medicine. The journal is published by Mac Keith Press and distributed on their behalf by Wiley-Blackwell. It is an official journal of both the American Academy for Cerebral Palsy and Developmental Medicine, the British Paediatric Neurology Association, the British Academy of Childhood Disability, the European Academy of Childhood Disability and the Academia Mexicana para la Paralisis Cerebral y Transtornos del Neurodesarollo. It was established in 1958 and the editor-in-chief is Bernard Dan. The North American Editor is Peter Rosenbaum. According to the Journal Citation Reports, the journal has a 2020 impact factor of 5.449, ranking it 7th out of 129 journals in the category "Pediatrics" and 39th out of 208 in the category "Clinical Neurology".
