= Motor unit plasticity =

The motor unit consists of a voluntary alpha motoneuron and all of the collective muscle fibers that it controls, known as the effector muscle. The alpha motoneuron communicates with acetylcholine receptors on the motor end plate of the effector muscle. Reception of acetylcholine neurotransmitters on the motor end plate causes contraction of that effector muscle.

Motor unit plasticity is defined as the ability of motoneurons and their respective effector muscles to physically and functionally change as a result of activity, age, and other factors. Motor unit plasticity has implications for improved athletic performance and resistance to immobility as a result of age. Recent advanced training techniques and physical therapy techniques that focus on improving neural function in addition to muscular function show promising results to improving athletic performances and extending mobility for the elderly.

== Plasticity due to Resistance Training ==
Resistance training has been shown to dramatically increase performance of motor units of the larger muscle groups. Motor unit plasticity of the larger muscle groups is extremely important for athletes, especially those participating in high impact and fast pace sports such as track and field, martial arts, and American football. Training that focuses on improving muscle strength and neural function via resistance training, is currently incorporated into many professional and collegiate training regiments. Motor unit plasticity can be measured in many ways, the most important of which being neural firing frequency, EMG amplitude, muscle force output, pre-synaptic inhibition, and synchronization.

=== Firing Frequency ===
Firing frequency is defined as the number of neuronal signals sent per second on one motoneuron. This frequency is measured in Hertz. Maximum firing frequency in humans typically ranges from 100 to 200 Hz. Studies incorporating electromyography have proven that adaptation mechanisms occurring as a result of resistance training can drastically increase the maximal firing frequency of a motoneuron. Firing frequency has been shown to increase by as much as 40 percent in professional athletes as a result of resistance training. Increases in firing frequency improve athletic force by decreasing the time to maximum muscle contraction (also known as reaction time) rather than increasing the maximum force output.

=== EMG amplitude ===
EMG, or electromyography, amplitude is the measure of the electric potential of motor units. Maximum EMG amplitude is more commonly referred to as maximum neuronal output. Studies have shown that maximum EMG amplitude increases with continual resistance training. These increases can range from minuscule to as much as a 50 percent increase after as little as a one-month training period. On average, at the end of a one-month period of consistent and repetitive resistance training, EMG amplitude reaches a plateau. Further increases in amplitude after this one-month period occur if the training regimen is varied. This plateau effect is assumed to occur as a result of sufficient neuronal adaptation to the resistance load. Variance in load or repetition causes the neuron to increase its output, and therefore EMG amplitude, to allow for increased muscular force of contraction after this plateau occurs.

=== Force Output ===
Force output undergoes much the same effects as EMG amplitude in response to resistance training. Force output significantly increases with resistance training and plateaus, on average, after about a month or less of consistent and repetitive training. Increases in force output after this plateau can only occur as a result of variation in training load or repetition. Increases in force output occur as a result of an increase in muscle fiber diameter. It is unknown exactly how much force output of a single motor unit can increase as it varies incredibly from person to person. For example, Olympic weight lifters have been able to increase their total force output (the output produced a group of muscles) by as much as one thousand percent from the start of training.

=== Pre-synaptic Inhibition ===
This form of inhibition commonly refers to the limiting of neural signals to transfer from one neuron to a subsequent neuron. Pre-synaptic inhibition is known to decrease in response to resistance training. This decrease occurs as a result of increased excitability of the motoneuron and decreased activity of inhibitory pathways. However, changes in pre-synaptic inhibition do not have as large an impact on motor unit performance as changes in force output, EMG amplitude, or firing frequency.

=== Neural Synchronization ===
Neural synchronization is the simultaneous firing of motoneurons. Synchronization leads to more efficient motor unit recruitment. Neural synchronization is important for muscle performance because the more motoneurons that are activated at once, the more muscle fibers that contract at once and hence the stronger the total force of contraction. Synchronization is known to slightly increase as a result of resistance training. Motor unit recruitment is frequently associated with synchronization and is defined as the order and number of neurons that are needed to perform a movement. Recruitment is not known to change in response to training or age.

== Plasticity due to Age and Inactivity ==
As a general rule, the opposite effects of resistance training are seen as a result of age and inactivity of the motor unit. Firing frequency, EMG amplitude, and force output all significantly decrease as a result of both age and inactivity. However, aging and inactivity are not known to produce significant decreases in neural synchronization of motor units. It is not known why synchronization does not decrease with age and inactivity.

== Plasticity according to Muscle Type ==
Fast twitch muscle units and slow twitch muscle units differ in their ability to produce force and resist fatigue. Fast twitch muscle units have the ability to produce great amounts of force but they do not resist fatigue for long periods of time whereas slow twitch muscle units do not produce great amounts of force but can resist fatigue for very long periods of time. Fast twitch muscles include large muscle groups such as the upper thigh and upper arm muscles whereas slow twitch muscles include high endurance muscles such as those used for posture. However, despite their drastic differences in structure and function, studies have shown that these types of muscle show the same trends in plasticity as a result of training and aging.

== Structural Changes of the Motor Unit ==
=== Nerve Terminal Branching and Acetylcholine Receptor Plasticity ===
Studies have shown that both activity and inactivity of motor unit affect the pre-synaptic and post-synaptic relationship of the neuromuscular junction of the motor unit. The ability of a motoneuron to branch at the neuromuscular junction represents the pre-synaptic plasticity of the motor unit. The ability of acetylcholine receptors to increase and decrease in number on the motor end plate of the effector muscle represents the post-synaptic plasticity of the motor unit. Studies have shown that with increased physical activity (resistance training or otherwise), volume of nerve terminal branching significantly increases. However, physical activity did not seem to increase the amount of acetylcholine receptors on the effector muscle. On the contrary, inactivity of the motor unit proved to significantly decrease the amount of acetylcholine receptors on the effector muscle and have no effect on nerve terminal branching. It is assumed that this loss of acetylcholine receptors due to inactivity is a result of a decrease in muscle fiber size. However, it is not known why the number of acetylcholine receptors does not increase as a result of activity or why nerve terminal branching does not decrease as a result of inactivity. Prior to activity based research having been done on the motor unit, it perhaps would have been logical to assume that the amount of acetylcholine receptors nerve terminal branching would both increase or decrease as a result of activity or inactivity, respectively. The cause of the apparent incongruence between the effects of inactivity and activity on the motor unit is not yet known.

=== Effector Muscle Size ===
Muscle fibers have the ability to drastically increase in size as a result of all types of training. Muscle size is not directly related to muscle strength (force output) as would most likely be assumed. Endurance training can increase the size of low force-producing slow twitch muscle by as much as resistance training can increase the size of high force-producing fast twitch muscle. These situations have the ability to result in two muscles of equal size, but the slow twitch muscle produces only a small fraction of the maximum contractile strength produced by the fast twitch muscle.

== Force Output due to Muscle Growth in Comparison to Neuronal Plasticity ==
Neurons adapt much quicker to training than muscle. The drastic increase in initial changes in force output at the start of physical training are due mostly to increases in firing frequency and EMG amplitude of the neuron. After this initial period of increase in force output, firing frequency and maximum EMG amplitude plateau. Only very small subsequent increases in these neural functions are seen after this plateau effect. This phenomenon of neurons adapting to training much quicker than muscle likely explains the frequently observed increase in strength at the very beginning of training occurring prior to muscle growth. Increases in force output after the plateau of neural functions are due almost entirely to muscle growth.
