= Maie St. John =

American physician

Maie St. John is an American surgeon, academic, and researcher known for her contributions to head and neck surgery and oncology. She holds the position of Director of Otolaryngology at Johns Hopkins University. Her research and clinical work focus on improving surgical techniques and understanding the molecular biology of head and neck cancers.

== Early life and education ==
St. John was born and raised in Madison, Wisconsin, and her grandfather, a physician in Egypt, introduced her to medicine. St. John earned a B.S. from Stanford University in 1992. St. John has an M.D. (1999) and a Ph.D. (1998) from Yale University. She did her internship at the University of California, Los Angeles from 1999 until 2001.

== Career ==
St. John's work centers on the mechanisms of cancer spread and resistance, with a primary focus on intraoperative tools that help identify cancerous cells during surgery. She started working at Johns Hopkins in 2025.

== Selected publications ==
- St John, Maie A R; Tao, Wufan; Fei, Xiaolan; Fukumoto, Royd; Carcangiu, Maria Luisa; Brownstein, David G; Parlow, Albert F; McGrath, James; Xu, Tian (1999). "Mice deficient of Lats1 develop soft-tissue sarcomas, ovarian tumours and pituitary dysfunction". Nature Genetics. 21 (2): 182–186. doi:10.1038/5965. ISSN 1061-4036.
- St. John, Maie A.; Dohadwala, Mariam; Luo, Jie; Wang, Guanyu; Lee, Gina; Shih, Hubert; Heinrich, Eileen; Krysan, Kostantyn; Walser, Tonya; Hazra, Saswati; Zhu, Li; Lai, Chi; Abemayor, Elliot; Fishbein, Michael; Elashoff, David A. (September 30, 2009). "Proinflammatory Mediators Upregulate Snail in Head and Neck Squamous Cell Carcinoma". Clinical Cancer Research. 15 (19): 6018–6027. doi:10.1158/1078-0432.CCR-09-0011. ISSN 1078-0432. PMC 2782528. PMID 19789323.
