= Kit Vaughan =

South African scientist

- Born: 21 April 1953 (age 73); Blyvooruitzicht, South Africa
- Education: Michaelhouse, Rhodes, Iowa and University of Cape Town
- Known for: Theories of human gait Imagining the Elephant (Author)
- Scientific career
- Fields: Biomedical Engineering
- Workplaces: University of Cape Town, University College Dublin, University of Virginia, Clemson University and University of Oxford
- Doctoral advisors: James G Hay, James G Andrews

Christopher L. 'Kit' Vaughan (born 21 April 1953), is Emeritus Professor of Biomedical Engineering in the Department of Human Biology, University of Cape Town in South Africa.

== Early life and education ==
Born in 1953 to Peter Leslie Vaughan, a mining engineer, and Margaret Baillie Vaughan at Blyvooruitzicht in the Western Transvaal, South Africa, Christopher Leonard 'Kit' Vaughan was educated at Michaelhouse, and then attended Rhodes University where he graduated in 1975, earning a Bachelor of Science degree in applied mathematics and physics.

While a student at the University of Iowa, where he received a PhD in musculoskeletal biomechanics in 1980. In 1983 he was a post-doctoral fellow in orthopaedic engineering at Oxford University when he first began to establish himself as a scholar in the field of human locomotion.

== Career ==
Vaughan spent the years 1986 to 1989 as an Associate Professor of Bioengineering at Clemson University, where he published Dynamics of Human Gait that, with the software package Gait Laboratory, was recognised as a seminal contribution to the field. Between 1989 and 1995 he was Professor of Orthopaedics and Biomedical Engineering at the University of Virginia where he directed the motion analysis laboratory and published significant findings on the treatment of children with cerebral palsy.

In 1996 Vaughan returned to South Africa to accept appointment as the Hyman Goldberg Professor of Biomedical Engineering at the University of Cape Town, a position he held until his retirement in 2009.

Vaughan is considered an authority on the biomechanics of human locomotion for which he was recognised with the award of a Doctor of Science in Medicine degree in 2009. He served as President of the International Society of Biomechanics from 1999 to 2001.

Vaughan was the founding director in 2000 of the Medical Imaging Research Unit at the University of Cape Town. He is the author of the award-winning book, Imagining the Elephant, a biography of Allan MacLeod Cormack who won the Nobel Prize in Medicine in 1979 for his contributions to the development of computer assisted tomography.

In 2006 Vaughan was elected a Fellow of the International Academy of Medical and Biological Engineering in recognition of his outstanding contributions to the field, and in 2009 he was awarded an A rating by the National Research Foundation of South Africa as a leading international scholar. In 2010 he took early retirement from the University of Cape Town to serve as chief executive officer of CapeRay Medical (Pty) Ltd, a spin out company that is developing innovative systems to detect breast cancer.

== Awards and honours ==
Vaughan was nominated for the Innovation Prize for Africa 2016.

== Publications ==
- Vaughan CL, "The biomechanics of running gait", CRC Critical Reviews in Biomedical Engineering, 12(1):1–48, 1984
- Vaughan CL, Davis BL, O'Connor JC, Dynamics of Human Gait, ISBN 0-87322-368-3, Human Kinetics Publishers, Illinois, 152 pages, 1992
- Sepulveda F, Wells D, Vaughan CL, "A neural network representation of electromyography and joint dynamics in human gait", Journal of Biomechanics, 26: 101–109, 1993
- Vaughan CL, Subramanian N, Busse ME, "Rhizotomy as a treatment option for children with cerebral palsy", Gait & Posture, 8(1): 43–59, 1998
- Vaughan CL, GaitCD, a CD-ROM containing four separate packages: Animate; GaitBib; GaitBook; and GaitLab, ISBN 0-620-23561-6, Kiboho Publishers, Cape Town, 1999
- Vaughan CL, "Theories of bipedal gait: an odyssey", Journal of Biomechanics, 36(4): 513–523, 2003
- Vaughan CL, Langerak N, O’Malley MJ “Neuromaturation of human locomotion revealed by non-dimensional scaling”, Experimental Brain Research, 153: 123–127, 2003
- Vaughan CL, O’Malley MJ “A gait nomogram used with fuzzy clustering to monitor functional status of children with cerebral palsy", Developmental Medicine and Child Neurology, 47(6): 377–383, 2005
- Vaughan CL, Blaszczyk MB “Dynamic similarity predicts gait parameters for Homo floresiensis and the Laetoli hominins”, American Journal of Human Biology, 20(3): 312–316, 2008
- Vaughan CL, Imagining the Elephant: A Biography of Allan MacLeod Cormack, ISBN 978-1-86094-988-3, Imperial College Press, London, 304 pages, 2008
