= Semel Institute for Neuroscience and Human Behavior =

Research institute at UCLA

Coordinates: 34.06577°N 118.44480°W

The Semel Institute for Neuroscience and Human Behavior is a research institute of the University of California Los Angeles (UCLA). It includes a number of centers, including the "Center for Neurobehavioral Genetics", which uses DNA sequencing, gene expression studies, bioinformatics, and the genetic manipulation of model organisms to understand brain and behavioral phenotypes.

== History ==
The UCLA Neuropsychiatric Institute and Hospital opened in 1961, consisting of The UCLA Neuropsychiatric Institute (NPI) and the UCLA Neuropsychiatric Hospital (NPH). It was in charge of the Department of Psychiatry and the Department of Neurology, and Neurosurgery and Neuropathology services. In 1973, NPI resources were transferred to the university, the institute became part of the Health Sciences, and the Department of Neurology became independent.

In 2004, the institute was renamed the Jane & Terry Semel Institute for Neuroscience and Human Behavior, and the Stewart & Lynda Resnick Neuropsychiatric Hospital at UCLA was established.

== Integrative Phenotyping Center for Neuropsychiatry ==
The institute plans to use a $14.9 million stimulus grant to create "The Integrative Phenotyping Center for Neuropsychiatry", a new interdisciplinary research center focused on the role of genetic and environmental factors in neuropsychiatric and behavioral disorders. This center is in the design phase and is expected to be under construction in 2011 and ready for occupancy in late 2012. It will employ around 180 employees and it will be housed in a 33,000-square-foot (3,100 m^{2}) space covering three renovated floors of the current Semel Institute tower. It will use a National Institutes of Health grant, funded through the American Recovery and Reinvestment Act of 2009, for research on autism, attention deficit disorder, schizophrenia, major depressive disorder, bipolar disorder, and Alzheimer's disease and other dementias. The facility will enable large-scale studies, including studies of personality, cognition, and brain activity and structure. "This project is completed."

== See also ==
- Mental disorder
- Psychiatric genetics
