= Neurorehabilitation and Neural Repair =

- Language: English
- Edited by: Randolph J. Nudo, PhD

Publication details
- History: 1987-present
- Publisher: SAGE Publications
- Frequency: 9/year
- Impact factor: 4.711 (2017)

Standard abbreviations
- ISO 4: Neurorehabilit. Neural Repair
- NLM: Neurorehabil Neural Repair

Indexing
- ISSN: 1545-9683 (print); 1552-6844 (web)
- OCLC no.: 51533032

Links
- Journal homepage; Online access; Online archive

Neurorehabilitation and Neural Repair is a peer-reviewed medical journal that publishes papers in the fields of rehabilitation and clinical neurology. The editor-in-chief is Randolph J. Nudo, PhD (University of Kansas Medical Center). It was established in 1987 and is currently published by SAGE Publications in association with American Society of Neurorehabilitation.

== Abstracting and indexing ==
The journal is abstracted and indexed in Scopus, Index Medicus, MEDLINE and the Science Citation Index. According to the Journal Citation Reports, its 2017 impact factor is 4.711, 1 out of 65 in Rehabilitation and 32 out of 197 in Clinical Neurology.
