= Ronald Reagan UCLA Medical Center =

Hospital in Los Angeles, California

- UCLA Health

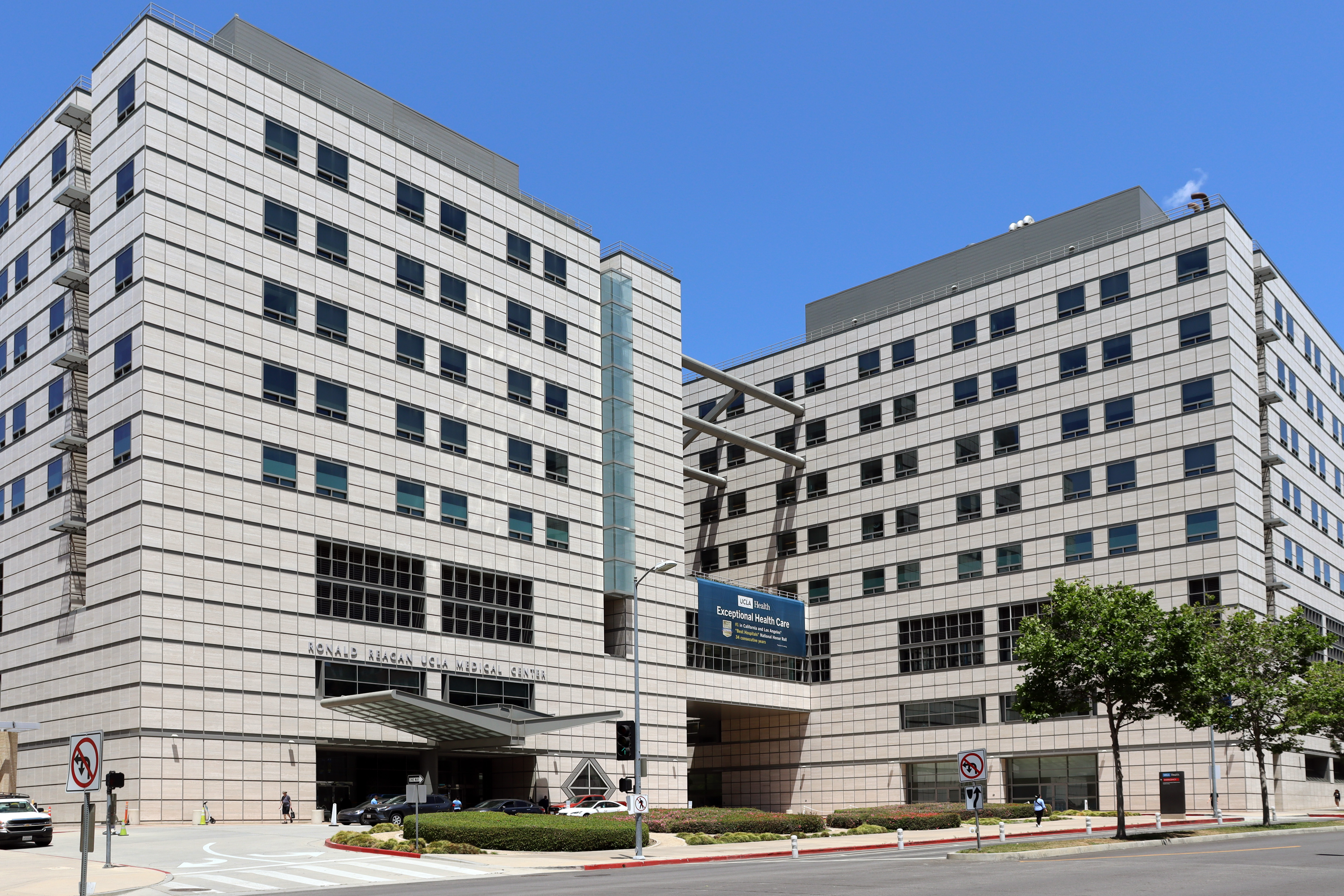
- The hospital in 2024

Geography
- Location: 757 Westwood Plaza, Westwood, Los Angeles, California, United States
- Coordinates: 34°3′59″N 118°26′46″W

Organization
- Care system: Private, Medicaid, Medicare
- Type: Teaching
- Affiliated university: University of California, Los Angeles

Services
- Emergency department: Level I Adult Trauma Center / Level II Pediatric Trauma Center
- Beds: 520

Helipads
- Helipad: FAA LID: 75CL

History
- Founded: 1955

Links
- Website: uclahealth.org/hospitals/reagan
- Lists: Hospitals in California

Ronald Reagan UCLA Medical Center (also commonly referred to as UCLA Medical Center, RRMC or Ronald Reagan) is a hospital located on the campus of the University of California, Los Angeles (UCLA), in Westwood, Los Angeles, California, United States. It is currently ranked by U.S. News & World Report as the best hospital in California and on the West Coast (tied with Cedars-Sinai Medical Center, Stanford University Medical Center, and UCSF Medical Center, all also in California). The hospital provides tertiary care to Los Angeles and the surrounding communities.

UCLA Medical Center has research centers covering nearly all major specialties of medicine and nursing as well as dentistry and is the primary teaching hospital for the David Geffen School of Medicine at UCLA and the UCLA School of Nursing. The hospital's emergency department is a Level I Adult Trauma Center and Level II Pediatric Trauma Center. Ronald Reagan UCLA Medical Center is a constituent part of UCLA Health, a comprehensive consortium of research hospitals and medical institutes affiliated with UCLA, including Ronald Reagan UCLA Medical Center; UCLA Medical Center, Santa Monica; Resnick Neuropsychiatric Hospital at UCLA; UCLA Mattel Children's Hospital; and UCLA Medical Group.

Collectively, the hospitals and specialty-care facilities of the UCLA Health system make it among the most comprehensive and advanced healthcare systems in the United States. In 2005, the American Nurses Credentialing Center granted the medical center "Magnet" status.

== History ==
On June 29, 2008, the new Ronald Reagan UCLA Medical Center opened and became fully operational, replacing the older facilities across the street. The older hospital complex had suffered moderate interior structural damage in the 1994 Northridge earthquake. Because numerous hospitals in the area were severely damaged during the Northridge earthquake and injured people had to be transported long distances for emergency care, the state of California passed SB1953, an amendment to an older law requiring all hospitals to move their acute care and intensive care units into earthquake-resistant buildings by 2008.

Originally budgeted at $598 million in 1998, construction began in 1999 and was completed in 2004. Cost overruns and construction delays attributed to rising construction costs and design changes due to medical advances resulted in the price of the building increasing to $829 million. Equipment purchased for the new building increased the total cost to over $1 billion. The Federal Emergency Management Agency contributed $432 million in earthquake relief funds to the project, and the state of California contributed $44 million. Private donations raised over $300 million for the project, including $150 million in President Reagan's name. The new building was constructed to withstand an 8.0 magnitude earthquake, one of the first buildings in California built to the most recent seismic standards.

The new 1.05-million-square-foot (98,000 m^{2}) hospital is named after the President of the United States and Governor of California Ronald Reagan (1911–2004). It was designed by C.C. "Didi" Pei of Pei Partnership Architects in collaboration with his father, Pritzker Prize-winning architect I.M. Pei. The hospital will contain fewer patient beds (525) than the one it replaces. Patient beds in the intensive-care units will be accessible to nurses and physicians from 360 degrees, and surgical floor plans will be modular, allowing them to be expanded and reconfigured as medical technology evolves. The hospital is sheathed with mechanically honed, cream-colored, horizontally grained travertine marble panels sold at below-market-rate cost by Carlo Marrioti, the owner of an Italian quarry whose cancer was cured at UCLA. The travertine elements were fastened to a sophisticated interlocking panelized aluminum cladding system developed by Benson Industries of Portland, Oregon. The building envelope is designed to resist and survive severe seismic events and maintain excellent resistance to air and water infiltration.

The older center itself is a sprawling 11-story brick building designed by Welton Becket. It is considered a landmark of early modern architecture. The center was built in several phases, the first of which was completed in 1953. The hospital has a "tic-tac-toe" layout of intersecting wings, creating a series of courtyards throughout the complex. The first floor is unusual in that most of its walls are completely clad in a thick layer of naturally-weathered, unfilled, travertine, creating an unusual "organic" appearance. The exterior architecture is very simple (as with many Becket designs), consisting of a red brick wall with horizontal bands of stainless-steel louvers over the windows to keep direct sunlight from heating the building.

Some of the old complex will be torn down, and some of it will be renovated and turned into office space when it is no longer an operational hospital. The law does not require that all parts of a hospital be made earthquake-safe, only the most important parts. Much of the extensive travertine wall cladding from the building's interior will most likely be salvaged and re-used.

== Facilities ==
=== Area covered for the paramedics ===
Ronald Reagan UCLA Medical Center has covered paramedic areas for the Fire Department.

- Beverly Hills F.D. – RA 1, 2 and 3
- Los Angeles Fire Department – RA 5, 19, 34, 37, 43, 58, 59, 63, 92, 94 and 95.
- Los Angeles County Fire Department – Squads 71, 88, 89 and 172.

=== Resnick Neuropsychiatric Hospital at UCLA ===
The Stewart & Lynda Resnick Neuropsychiatric Hospital at UCLA is a 74-bed acute care psychiatric hospital located within the Ronald Reagan UCLA Medical Center. Following a donation, the hospital was named for Lynda Resnick and her husband. The hospital has a pediatrics unit, adolescent unit, an adult unit, and a geriatrics unit

=== UCLA Mattel Children's Hospital ===
UCLA Mattel Children's Hospital at Ronald Reagan UCLA Medical Center is a pediatric acute care hospital located in Los Angeles, California. The hospital has 156 beds. It is affiliated with the University of California, Los Angeles David Geffen School of Medicine, and is a member of UCLA Health. The hospital provides comprehensive pediatric specialties and subspecialties to pediatric patients aged 0–21 throughout California. UCLA Mattel Children's Hospital features a pediatric level 1 trauma center. The UCLA Mattel Children's Hospital is located on the third and fifth floors of the Ronald Reagan UCLA Medical Center.

== Death of Michael Jackson ==
On June 25, 2009, American singer Michael Jackson died from acute propofol and benzodiazepine intoxication at his home. Conrad Murray, his personal physician, had given Jackson various medications to help him sleep at his rented mansion in Holmby Hills, Los Angeles. Paramedics received a 911 call at 12:22 p.m. Pacific time (19:22 UTC), and arrived three minutes later. Jackson was not breathing and CPR was performed. Resuscitation efforts continued en route to Ronald Reagan UCLA Medical Center, and for more than an hour after arriving there, but were unsuccessful, and Jackson was pronounced dead at 2:26 pm Pacific time (21:26 UTC).

== Notable people ==
=== Physicians ===
- David Ho
- Louis Ignarro – UCLA faculty member and pharmacologist Louis Ignarro's discovery of one of the most important signaling molecules in the human body, nitric oxide, led to his winning the Nobel Prize in medicine in 1998. This discovery revolutionized the fields of cardiopulmonary medicine and immunology.
- Patrick Soon-Shiong

=== Births ===
- Beyoncé and Jay Z's twins Rumi and Sir Carter (June 13, 2017)
- Maud Elizabeth Daphne Marina (First American Born British Royal)

=== Notable patients ===
- Freddie Prinze died on January 29, 1977
- Jack Soo died on January 11, 1979
- Jack Haley died on June 6, 1979
- John Wayne died on June 11, 1979
- Pat Buttram died on January 8, 1994
- Friz Freleng died on May 26, 1995
- Mary Wickes died on October 22, 1995
- Marlon Brando died on July 1, 2004
- Rodney Dangerfield died on October 5, 2004
- Charles Nelson Reilly died on May 25, 2007
- Harvey Korman died on May 29, 2008
- Nina Foch died on December 5, 2008
- Wayne Allwine died on May 18, 2009
- Ed McMahon died on June 23, 2009
- Michael Jackson died on June 25, 2009
- Andrew Breitbart died on March 1, 2012
- Richard Dawson died on June 2, 2012
- Zsa Zsa Gabor died on December 18, 2016
- Carrie Fisher died on December 27, 2016
- Adam West died on June 9, 2017
- Martin Landau died on July 15, 2017
- Charlie Robinson died on July 11, 2021
- Eve Babitz died on December 17, 2021
- James Caan died on July 6, 2022
- Michael Newman died on October 20, 2024

== Controversy ==
=== Mo cell line controversy ===
UCLA Medical Center is well known as the defendant in a Supreme Court of California case, Moore v. Regents of the University of California, 51 Cal. 3d 120 (1990). The court decided that patient John Moore had no property rights in the immensely profitable "Mo" cell line which UCLA researchers had discovered when they removed his cancerous spleen.

=== CRE outbreak ===
As of 2015, seven people had been infected by and two have died from carbapenem-resistant enterobacteriaceae, a drug-resistant superbug. A total of 179 people were exposed to the bacteria via two duodenoscopes which were not disinfected sufficiently. The outbreak is not serious, however, as the superbug is not a serious threat to healthy patients, and cannot be transmitted easily through its own means. The risk of infection via duodenoscope is very low as well, with procedures being performed on over 500,000 individuals between 2013 and 2014, and only 135 cases of CRE being reported as a result. Some doctors believe several more outbreaks of this nature are imminent. Since the outbreak, demands have been made to the FDA to improve their regulation and sanitation of medical devices.

== See also ==
- Harbor-UCLA Medical Center
- Olive View-UCLA Medical Center
- UCLA Medical Center, Santa Monica
- UCLA Health, overarching administrative structure, comprising the UCLA hospitals.
- UCLA Health Care, the billing and administrative organ of the UCLA Health System.
- UCLA Medical Group, a health care group of physicians affiliated with UCLA.
