= Kenneth Kaushansky =

American medical doctor and hematologist

- Born: October 20, 1953 (age 73); Montreal, Quebec, Canada
- Citizenship: U.S.
- Education: University of California, Los Angeles
- Scientific career
- Fields: Internal Medicine, Hematology
- Workplaces: University of Washington School of Medicine; University of California, San Diego School of Medicine; Stony Brook University School of Medicine

Kenneth Kaushansky (born October 20, 1953) is an American medical doctor, hematologist, former editor of the medical journal Blood, and served as the dean of the Stony Brook University School of Medicine from 2010 to 2021. Prior to moving to Stony Brook, he was the Helen M. Ranney Professor and chair of the Department of Medicine at the University of California, San Diego School of Medicine.

== Early life and education ==
Kaushansky was born on October 20, 1953, in Montreal, Quebec, Canada. The family migrated to the United States when Kaushansky was two years old. Kaushansky graduated from UCLA in 1975, summa cum laude and Phi Beta Kappa, with a B.S. in biochemistry. He stayed at UCLA to obtain his medical degree in 1979. He completed his internship and residency in hematology at the University of Washington in Seattle. Kaushansky was appointed Chief Resident at the Swedish Medical Center in Seattle, Washington, in 1982. He completed his fellowship in hematology at the University of Washington.

During his time in Seattle, he was honored with the NIH Physician Scientist Award in 1984, given to promising physician-scientists early in their careers. He was also awarded the junior faculty award by the American Cancer Society and was elected a member of the American Society for Clinical Investigation and the Association of American Physicians.

In 2002, Kaushansky was appointed as Chair and Helen M. Ranney Professor of the Department of Medicine at the University of California, San Diego.

Between 2003 and 2009, Kaushansky was named on the list of America's Top Doctors and San Diego's Top Doctors in Internal Medicine. In 2004, he was also elected a member to the prestigious Institute of Medicine of the National Academy of Sciences.

Kaushansky is a past president of the American Society of Hematology (2007-2008), the American Society for Clinical Investigation (2004–2005) and the Western Society for Clinical Investigation (1998–1999). He also served a five-year term as editor-in-chief of the journal Blood (1998-2002) and as a major reviewer for the National Institutes of Health and many major scientific periodicals. Kaushansky has been recognized for his scientific and clinical contributions by election as a Master of the American College of Physicians, and to several honor societies and organizations, including the American Society for Clinical Investigation, the Association of American Physicians, the Institute of Medicine of the National Academies of Science and the American Academy of Arts and Sciences.

== Work and research ==
From 2010 to 2021, Kaushansky was the senior vice president for health sciences and the dean of Stony Brook Medicine. He succeeded Dr. Richard N. Fine, who announced his intent to return to practicing pediatric nephrology in 2009. As dean and senior VP, Kaushansky oversaw the education, clinical and research components of the school of medicine and the health sciences, which include the school of dental medicine, school of health technology and management, school of nursing and the school of social welfare. He also had some oversight responsibility for Stony Brook University Medical Center, and oversight for the Long Island State Veterans Home. With 25 academic departments, 21 residency training programs and 27 fellowship training programs at Stony Brook Medicine, and as part of the only academic medical center on Long Island, Kaushansky increased enrollment to help meet a growing need for physicians nationwide and welcomed 124 men and women to the class of 2012 – the largest incoming class ever. Stony Brook Medicine is also home to a $4 million, 6,000 square-feet Clinical Skills Center, a state-of-the art training center where medical students evaluate and diagnose patients through teaching modules that incorporate the use of actor patients and computerized mannequins that simulate characteristic disease conditions.

Kaushansky's appointment at Stony Brook was lauded by several academicians such as Eric W. Kaler the then provost and vice-president of Brookhaven Affairs at Stony Brook University and Dr. Edward J. Benz, the president of the Dana–Farber Cancer Institute and past president of the American Society of Hematology and the American Society for Clinical Investigation.

Kaushansky's lab at Stony Brook focuses on hematopoietic growth factors and the regulation of their gene expression. The lab also runs several projects to understand the physiology of megakaryocytic developments and the tools necessary to perform gene therapy for bleeding disorders. Kaushansky has conducted seminal research on the molecular biology of blood cell production. As reported in journals such as Nature and The New England Journal of Medicine, his team has cloned several of the genes important in the growth and differentiation of blood cells, including thrombopoietin, a key regulator of stem cell and platelet production. Thrombopoietin is the powerful hormone that the body uses to direct the bone marrow to produce platelets, the disk-like cells that are necessary for blood to clot.

In June 1994, The New York Times reported that Kaushansky along with a team from ZymoGenetics had found the mouse thrombopoietin gene, cloned it, produced recombinant hormone, demonstrated that it worked as expected in mice and then found the human hormone by looking for a human gene that resembled the mouse gene. In recent years his group has established that thrombopoietin exerts a profound influence on hematopoietic stem cells, affects the expression of a number of transcription factors that influence stem cell fate decisions (HOXB4, HOXA9, c-Myb, HIF1A) and has unraveled the pathobiology of several congenital disorders of thrombopoiesis.

Kaushansky served as the editor-in-chief of the medical journal Blood for five years between 1997 and 2002. Just before assuming this position, he was awarded the William Dameshek Prize. William Dameshek was the founder of Blood and a renowned hematologist. The Dameshek Prize is awarded annually to someone less than 50 years of age, who is deemed to have made "outstanding contributions" to hematology. In 2006 and 2007, Kaushansky was elected as a member the American Academy of Arts and Sciences, and honored as a Master of the American College of Physicians. He is also the former president of the American Society for Clinical Investigation and the American Society of Hematology.

== Personal life ==
Kaushansky is married to Lauren Elizabeth Kaushansky and together they have two children, Alexis and Joshua Kaushansky. Alexis is a PhD molecular biologist and Joshua is an economist for the Massachusetts Department of Public Utilities based in Boston. Kaushansky and his wife reside in Eatons Neck, New York.

== Patents awarded ==
- US Patent #5,546,536: Inventors: Kaushansky K, Hagen FS. Colony-stimulating factor derivatives. 1988
- US Patent # 5,989,537: Inventors: Holly RD, Lok S, Foster DC, Kaushansky K, Kuijper JL, Lofton-Day CE, Oort PJ. Methods for stimulating granulocyte-macrophage lineage using thrombopoietin. 1999
- US Patent #6,099,830: Inventors: Kaushansky K. Methods for stimulating erythropoiesis using hematopoietic proteins. August 8, 2000
- Australian Patent #725159: Inventor: Kaushansky K. Methods for stimulating erythropoiesis using thrombopoietin. October 5, 2000
- Australian Patent #723793: Inventors: Holly RD, Lok S, Foster DC, Hagen FS, Kaushansky K, Kuijper JL, Lofton-Day CE, Oort PJ, Burkhead SK. Hematopoietic protein and materials and methods for making it. December 21, 2000
- US Patent #6,316,254: Inventors: Holly RD, Lok S, Foster DC, Kaushansky K, Kuijper JL, Lofton-Day CE, Oort PJ. Methods for stimulating erythropoiesis using hematopoietic proteins. November 13, 2001
- International Patent # WO 2004/026332A1: Kaushansky K, MacDonald B. Methods of increasing platelet and hematopoietic stem cell production. April 1, 2004.

== Selected publications ==
- Kaushansky K, Lok S, Holly RD, Broudy VC, Lin N, Bailey MC, Forstrom JW, Buddle M, Oort PJ, Hagen FS, Roth GJ, Papayannopoulou Th, Foster DC: Promotion of megakaryocyte progenitor expansion and differentiation by the c-Mpl ligand thrombopoietin. Nature 369:568-571, 1994.
- Lok S, Kaushansky K, Holly RD, Kuijper JL, Lofton-Day CE, Oort PJ, Grant FJ, Heipel MD, Burkhead SK, Kramer JM, Bell LA, Sprecher CA, Blumberg H, Johnson R, Prunkard D, Ching AFT, Mathewes S, Bailey MC, Forstrom JW, Buddle MM, Osborn SG, Evans SJ, Sheppard PO, Presnell SR, O'Hara PJ, Hagen FS, Roth GJ., Foster DC: Cloning and expression of murine thrombopoietin cDNA and stimulation of platelet production in vivo. Nature 369:565-568, 1994.
- Kaushansky K, Broudy VC, Lin N, Jorgensen MJ, McCarty J, Fox N, Zucker-Franklin D, Lofton-Day C: Thrombopoietin, the Mpl-ligand, is essential for full megakaryocyte development. Proc. Natl. Acad. Sci. USA 92:3234-3238, 1995.
- Kaushansky K, Broudy, VC, Grossmann A, Humes J, Lin N, Ren H-P, Bailey MC, Papayannopoulou Th, Forstrom JW, Sprugel KH: Thrombopoietin expands erythroid progenitors, increases red cell production, and enhances erythroid recovery after myelosuppressive therapy. J. Clin. Invest. 96:1683-1687, 1995.
- Fero ML, Rivkin M, Tasch M, Porter P, Carow CE, Firpo E, Polyak K, Tsai LH, Broudy VC, Perlmutter R, Kaushansky K, Roberts JM: A syndrome of gigantism, tumorigenesis and female sterility in p27Kip-1 deficient mice. Cell. 85:733-744, 1996.
- Kaushansky K, Shoemaker SG, O'Rork C, McCarty J: The regulation of GM-CSF is dependent on a complex interplay of multiple nuclear regulatory proteins. Mol. Immunol. 33: 461–470, 1996.
- Kaushansky K: Thrombopoietin. Drug Therapy Series. The New England Journal of Medicine 339:746-754, 1998
- Parrish-Novak J, Dillon SR, Nelson A, Hammond A, Sprecher C, Gross JA, Johnston J, Madden K, Xu W, West J, Schrader S, Burkhead S, Heipel M, Brandt C, Kuijper J, Kramer J, Conklin D, Presnell SR, Berry J, Shiota F, Bort S, Hambly K, Mudri S, Clegg C, Moore M, Grant FJ, Lofton-Day C, Gilbert T, Raymond F, Ching A, Yao L, Smith D, Webster P, Whitmore T, Maurer M, Kaushansky K, Holly R, Foster D. Interleukin 21 and IL21R: A novel cytokine-receptor pair involved in NK cell expansion and lymphocyte function. Nature 408: 57-63, 2000
- Geddis AE, Kaushansky K. Endomitotic megakaryocytes form a midzone in anaphase but have a deficiency in cleavage furrow formation. Cell Cycle. 2006; 5:538-545
- Kaushansky K. Lineage specific hematopoietic growth factors. The New England Journal of Medicine 354:2034-2045, 2006
- Geron I, Abrahamsson A, Kavalerchik E, Barroga C, Gotlib J, Hood J, Soll R, Noronha G, Durocher J, Tefferi A, Kaushansky K, Jamieson C. Selective inhibition of JAK2 driven erythroid differentiation potential of polycythemia vera progenitors. Cancer Cell, 2008; 13:321-330
- Hitchcock I, Chen M, Fox NE, Kaushansky K. YRRL motifs in the cytoplasmic domain of the thrombopoietin receptor regulate receptor internalization and degradation. Blood 2008 112:2222-2231
- Soda M, Willert K, Kaushansky K, Geddis A. Inhibition of GSK-3a promotes survival and proliferation of megakaryocytic cells through b-catenin-independent signaling. Cell Signal. 2008 20:2317-2323
- Kaushansky K: Thrombopoietin: Biological and preclinical properties. Leukemia 10:Suppl. S46-48, 1996
- Kaushansky K, Lok S: The molecular and cellular biology of thrombopoietin, the MPL ligand. In: Molecular Basis of Thrombosis and Hemostatis. KA High, HR Roberts (Eds.), Marcel Dekker, Inc., New York, NY pp. 651-662, 1995.
- Kaushansky K: In vitro predictions, in vivo realities. Platelets 8: 444–445, 1997.
