= Dilip V. Jeste =

American geriatric neuropsychiatrist

Dilip V. Jeste is an American geriatric neuropsychiatrist, who specializes in successful aging as well as schizophrenia and other psychotic disorders in older adults. He was senior associate dean for healthy aging and senior care, distinguished professor of psychiatry and neurosciences, Estelle and Edgar Levi Memorial Chair in Aging, director of the Sam and Rose Stein Institute for Research on Aging, and co-director of the IBM-UCSD Artificial Intelligence Center for Healthy Living at the University of California, San Diego School of Medicine. after serving for 36 years, he retired from UC San Diego on July 1, 2022.

He is the author, with Scott LaFee, of Wiser: The Scientific Roots of Wisdom, Compassion, and What Makes Us Good. In it, he describes evidence-based findings on the definition, measurement, and neurobiology of wisdom as well as its relationship with aging, and interventions to promote wisdom.

Jeste is past president of the American Psychiatric Association (APA). He was the first Asian-American, to preside over this 175-year-old organization. He was also the first psychiatrist of Indian descent to be elected to the Institute of Medicine (IOM) of the National Academy of Sciences. He gave a TEDMED talk on wisdom and aging in 2015.

Jeste has published 14 books, more than 750 articles in peer-reviewed journals, and over 160 book chapters, and he was listed in "The Best Doctors in America", and also in the Institute for Scientific Information list of the "world's most cited authors", comprising less than 0.5% percent of all publishing researchers of the previous two decades. He has received numerous awards, including those from the National Alliance on Mental Illness, International Psychogeriatric Association, National Institute of Mental Health (NIMH), Institute of Living, Veterans Affairs, and APA.

== Professional experience ==
Jeste obtained his medical degree in Pune, and psychiatry training at KEM hospital in Mumbai, India. After coming to the United States, he completed psychiatry residency at Cornell University, and neurology residency at George Washington University. He was a research fellow, and later, Chief of the Units on Movement Disorders and Dementias at the National Institute of Mental Health (NIMH). In 1986 he joined UC San Diego School of Medicine, where he developed an NIMH-funded Geriatric Psychiatry Clinical Research Center, focused on schizophrenia and other psychoses in late life. He was editor-in-chief of The American Journal of Geriatric Psychiatry for 15 years, and is currently the editor-in-chief of International Psychogeriatrics.

Jeste's work has been cited nationally and internationally in popular media including PBS, National Public Radio, Time, The New York Times, The Atlantic, The Times, Los Angeles Times, O, The Oprah Magazine and Scientific American, among others.

== Research ==
Jeste's primary areas of research are psychosis and its treatment in late life, and successful cognitive aging, including wisdom. He has also conducted studies of clinical, neuropsychological and neurobiological characteristics of late-onset schizophrenia, aging of early-onset schizophrenia patients, and psychosis of Alzheimer's disease. In terms of treatments, he has published on therapeutic and adverse effects (including tardive dyskinesia and metabolic syndrome) of antipsychotics. He also has published on psychosocial treatments as well as certain bioethical aspects of research (particularly decision making capacity and methods for enhancing it) among older people with psychotic disorders.

== Personal life ==
Jeste was born in a small town in the state of Maharashtra, India, and became the first medical doctor in his family. He and his wife, Sonali Jeste, M.D. (who later became a child psychiatrist), immigrated to the U.S. in 1974 to pursue further training. They live in San Diego, California, and have two daughters.

== Selected books ==
- Jeste DV and Wyatt RJ: Understanding and Treating Tardive Dyskinesia. New York: Guilford Press Inc. 1982 (363 pages).
- Mueser KT and Jeste DV (eds): Clinical Handbook of Schizophrenia. New York: Guilford Press, 2008 (650 pages).
- Depp CA and Jeste DV (eds): Successful Cognitive and Emotional Aging. Washington, DC: American Psychiatric Press, Inc., 2009 (419 pages).
- Jeste DV and Bell CC (eds): Prevention in Mental Health: Lifespan Perspective. Psychiatric Clinics of North America. W. B. Sunders Company, a Division of Elsevier Inc., Philadelphia, PA, 2011 (274 pages).
- Dilip V. Jeste, MD, and Barton W. Palmer, PhD, Eds. (2015): Positive Psychiatry: A Clinical Handbook. Arlington, VA: American Psychiatric Publishing.
- Dilip V. Jeste, MD, with Scott LaFee: Wiser: The Scientific Roots of Wisdom. New York, NY: Sounds True. 2020

== Selected articles ==
- Jeste DV, Potkin SG, Sinha S, Feder SL and Wyatt RJ: "Tardive dyskinesia reversible and persistent" Archives of General Psychiatry 36:585 590, 1979.
- Jeste DV, Gillin JC and Wyatt RJ: "Serendipity in biological psychiatry A myth?" Archives of General Psychiatry 36:1173 1178, 1979.
- Jeste DV and Wyatt RJ: "Changing epidemiology of tardive dyskinesia An overview" American Journal of Psychiatry 138:297 309, 1981.
- Jeste DV, Kleinman JE, Potkin SG, Luchins DJ and Weinberger DR: "Ex uno multi: Subtyping the schizophrenia syndrome. (Recipient of the A.E. Bennett Research Award for 1981) Biological Psychiatry 17:199 222, 1982.
- Harris MJ and Jeste DV: "Late onset schizophrenia: An overview" Schizophrenia Bulletin 14:39-55, 1988.
- Jeste DV and Lohr JB: "Hippocampal pathologic findings in schizophrenia: A morphometric study" Archives of General Psychiatry 46:1019-1024, 1989.
- Jeste DV, Lohr JB and Manley M: "Study of neuropathologic changes in the striatum following four, eight and twelve months of treatment with fluphenazine in rats" Psychopharmacology 106:154-160, 1992.
- Gilbert PL, Harris MJ, McAdams LA and Jeste DV: "Neuroleptic withdrawal in schizophrenic patients: A review of the literature" Archives of General Psychiatry 52:173-188, 1995.
- Jeste DV, Caligiuri MP, Paulsen JS, Heaton RK, Lacro JP, Harris MJ, Bailey A, Fell RL and McAdams LA: "Risk of tardive dyskinesia in older patients: A prospective longitudinal study of 266 outpatients" Archives of General Psychiatry 52:756-765, 1995.
- Cuffel BJ, Jeste DV, Patterson TL, Halpain M, Pratt C: "Treatment costs and use of community mental health services for schizophrenia by age-cohorts" American Journal of Psychiatry 153(7): 870–876, 1996.
- Palmer BW, Heaton RK, Paulsen JS, Kuck J, Braff D, Harris MJ, Zisook S and Jeste DV: "Is it possible to be schizophrenic yet neuropsychologically normal?" Neuropsychology 11(3):437-446, 1997.
- Jeste DV, Symonds LL, Harris MJ, Paulsen JS, Palmer BW and Heaton RK: "Non-dementia non-praecox dementia praecox?: Late-onset schizophrenia". The American Journal of Geriatric Psychiatry 5(4):302-317, 1997.
- Jeste DV, Lohr JB, Eastham JH, Rockwell E and Caligiuri MP: "Adverse effects of long-term use of neuroleptics: Human and animal studies". Journal of Psychiatry Research 32:201-214, 1998.
- Jeste DV, Alexopoulos GS, Bartels SJ, Cummings JL, Gallo JJ, Gottlieb GL, Halpain MC, Palmer BW, Patterson TL, Reynolds CF and Lebowitz BD: "Consensus statement on the upcoming crisis in geriatric mental health: Research agenda for the next two decades" Archives of General Psychiatry 56:848-853, 1999.
- Jeste DV and Finkel SI: "Psychosis of Alzheimer's disease and related dementias: Diagnostic criteria for a distinct syndrome". The American Journal of Geriatric Psychiatry 8: 29–34, 2000.
- Howard R, Rabins P, Seeman MV, Jeste DV and the International Late-Onset Schizophrenia Group: "Late-onset schizophrenia and very-late-onset schizophrenia-like psychosis: An international consensus" American Journal of Psychiatry 157:172-178, 2000.
- Heaton RK, Gladsjo JA, Palmer BW, Kuck J, Marcotte TD and Jeste DV: "Stability and course of neuropsychological deficits in schizophrenia" Archives of General Psychiatry 58:24-32, 2001.
- Patterson TL, Goldman S, McKibbin CL, Hughs T and Jeste DV: "UCSD Performance-Based Skills Assessment: Development of a new measure of everyday functioning for severely mentally ill adults" Schizophrenia Bulletin 27(2): 235–245, 2001
- Depp CA and Jeste DV: "Bipolar disorder in older adults: A critical review". Bipolar Disorders 6: 343–367, 2004.
- Folsom DP, Hawthorne W, Lindamer L, Gilmer T, Bailey A, Golshan S, Garcia P, Unutzer J, Hough R and Jeste DV: "Prevalence and risk factors for homelessness and utilization of mental health services among 10,340 patients with serious mental illness in a large public mental health system" American Journal of Psychiatry 162: 370–376, 2005.
- Depp C and Jeste DV: "Definitions and predictors of successful aging: A comprehensive review of the literature". The American Journal of Geriatric Psychiatry 14:6-20, 2006.
- Patterson TL, McKibbin C, Mausbach BT, Goldman S, Bucardo J and Jeste DV: "Functional Adaptation Skills Training (FAST): A randomized trial of a psychosocial intervention for middle-aged and older patients with chronic psychotic disorders". Schizophrenia Research 86:291-299, 2006.
- Jeste DV, Halpain M, Trinidad G, Reichstadt J, and Lebowitz BD: "UCSD's short-term research training programs for trainees at different levels of career development". Academic Psychiatry 31:160-167, 2007.
- Jeste DV, Palmer BW, Appelbaum PS, Golshan S, Glorioso D, Dunn LB, Kim K, Meeks T, Kraemer HC: "A new brief instrument for assessing decisional capacity for clinical research" Archives of General Psychiatry 64:966-974, 2007.
- Folsom DP, Gilmer T, Barrio C, Moore DJ, Bucardo J, Lindamer LA, Garcia P, Hawthorne W, Hough R, Patterson T, and Jeste DV: "A longitudinal study of the use of mental health services by persons with serious mental illness: Spanish-speaking Latinos differ from English-speaking Latinos and Caucasians" American Journal of Psychiatry 164:1173-1180, 2007.
- Granholm E, McQuaid JR, McClure FS, Link P, Perivoliotis D, Gottlieb JD, Patterson T and Jeste DV: "Randomized controlled trial of cognitive behavioral social skills training for older people with schizophrenia: 12-month follow-up" Journal of Clinical Psychiatry 68:730-7, 2007.
- Jeste DV, Blazer D, Casey DE, Meeks T, Salzman C, Schneider L, Tariot P and Yaffe K: "ACNP White Paper: Update on the use of antipsychotic drugs in elderly persons with dementia" Neuropsychopharmacology 33:957-970, 2008.
- Jeste DV and Vahia I: "Comparison of the conceptualization of wisdom in ancient Indian literature with modern views: Focus on the Bhagavad Gita". Psychiatry 71:197-209, 2008.
- Meeks TW and Jeste DV: "Neurobiology of wisdom: An overview" Archives of General Psychiatry 66:355-365, 2009.
- Jeste DV, Palmer BW, Golshan S, Eyler LT, Dunn LB, Meeks T, Glorioso D, Fellows I, Kraemer H and Appelbaum PS: "Multimedia consent for research in people with schizophrenia and normal subjects: A randomized controlled trial" Schizophrenia Bulletin 35:719-29, 2009.
- Jeste DV and Harris JC: "Commentary: Wisdom - A neuroscience perspective" Journal of the American Medical Association 304:1602-1603, 2010.
- Soontornniyomkij V, Risbrough VB, Young JW, Wallace CK, Soontornniyomkij B, Jeste DV and Achim CL: "Short-term recognition memory impairment is associated with decreased expression of FK506 binding protein 51 in the aged mouse brain". Age 32:309-322, 2010.
- Jeste DV, Wolkowitz OM and Palmer BW: "Divergent trajectories of physical, cognitive, and psychosocial aging in schizophrenia" Schizophrenia Bulletin 37:451-455, 2011.
- Jeste DV: "Promoting successful ageing through integrated care" British Medical Journal 2011; 343: d6808.
- Jeste DV: "Mental health and the 2012 US election". The Lancet, 6 October 2012, Vol. 380, Issue 9849, Pages 1206–1208.
- Lee EE, Liu J, Tu X, Palmer BW, Eyler LT, Jeste DV: "A Widening Longevity Gap between People with Schizophrenia and General Population: A Literature Review and Call for Action". Special Issue. Schizophrenia Research
- Jeste DV, Palmer BW, Rettew DC, Boardman S. "Positive psychiatry: its time has come". Journal of Clinical Psychiatry 76:675-83, 2015.
- Lewis-Fernández R, Rotheram-Borus MJ, Betts VT, Greenman L, Essock SM, Brent D, Escobar JI, Barch D, Hogan MF, Areán PA, Druss BG, DiClemente RJ, McGlashan TH, Jeste DV, Proctor EK, Ruiz P, Rush AJ, Canino GJ, Bell CC, Henry R, Iversen P: "Rethinking funding priorities in mental health research". British Journal of Psychiatry. 2016 Jun;208(6):507-9.
- Jeste DV, Palmer BW: "Mild Neurocognitive Disorder: A Model for Accelerated Biological Aging?" American Journal Geriatric Psychiatry. 2016 Nov;24(11):987-988.
- Jeste DV, Blazer II DG, Buckwalter KC, Cassidy KL, Fishman L, Gwyther LP, Levin S, Liu K, JLustig T, Phillipson C, Rao R, Rosenbloom S, Schmeding E, Vega W, Avanzino JA, Glorioso DK, Feather, J: "Age-Friendly Communities Initiative: Public Health Approach to Promoting Successful Aging". American Journal Geriatric Psychiatry. 2016 Dec;24(12):1158-1170.
- Jeste DV, Avanzino J, Depp CA, Gawronska M, Tu X, Sewell DD, Huege SF: "Effect of Short-Term Research Training Programs on Medical Students' Attitudes Toward Aging". Gerontology & Geriatrics Education, DOI: 10.1080/02701960.2017.1340884. 2017 Jun 14:1-9.
- Jeste DV, Palmer BW, Saks ER: "Why We Need Positive Psychiatry for Schizophrenia and Other Psychotic Disorders". Schizophrenia Bulletin. 2017 Mar 1;43(2):227-229
- Thomas ML, Bangen K, Palmer BW, Martin AS, Avanzino JA, Glorioso DK, Daly RE, Jeste, DV: "A New Scale for Assessing Wisdom Based on Common Domains and a Neurobiological Model: The San Diego Wisdom Scale (SD-WISE)". Journal of Psychiatric Research
