= Michael R. Irwin =

American psychiatrist and academic

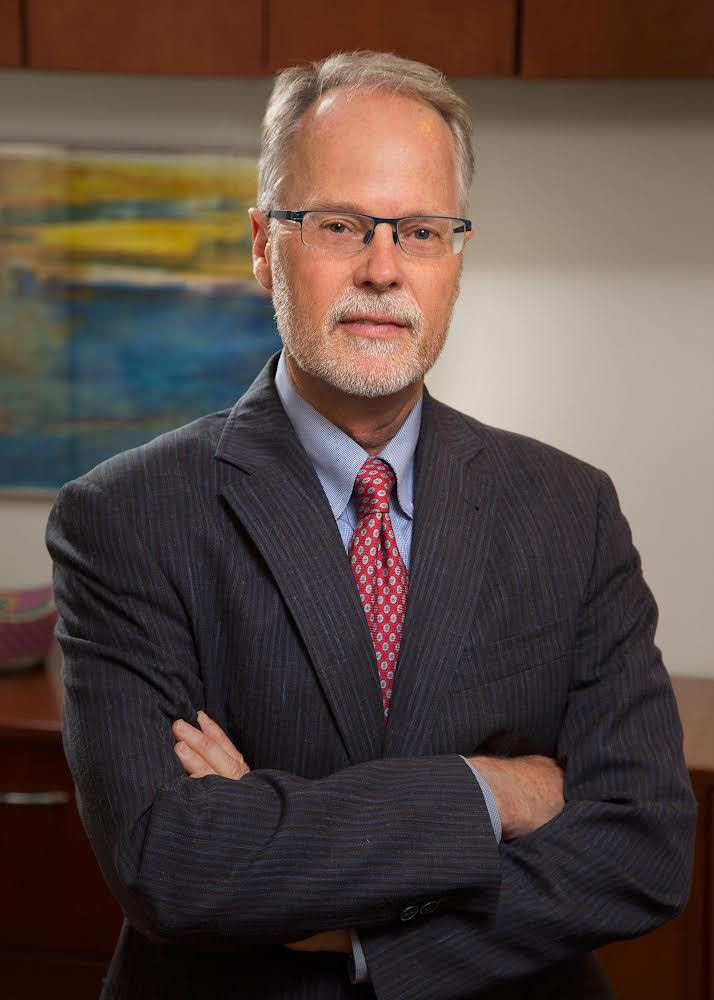
- Occupations: Psychiatrist and academic

Academic background
- Education: Doctor of Medicine
- Alma mater: University of Pennsylvania; UCSD School of Medicine; UCLA School of Medicine; American Board of Psychiatry and Neurology

Academic work
- Institutions: University of California, Los Angeles

Michael R. Irwin is an American psychiatrist and academic who is the Norman Cousins Chair of the Semel Institute for Neuroscience and Human Behavior and a Distinguished Professor of Psychiatry and Biobehavioral Sciences at the University of California, Los Angeles (UCLA). He is also the Director of the Cousins Center for Psychoneuroimmunology and the Mindful Awareness Research Center at UCLA.

Irwin's work is focused on psychoneuroimmunology, exploring interactions between psychological processes and the nervous and immune systems. He has written over 500 research articles and five books. He has received awards for his contributions, including the Norman Cousins Award for "outstanding contribution to clinical psychoneuroimmunology and understanding the reciprocal links between depression, sleep, and the immune system" and the George Solomon Memorial Lecture Award for "innovation in understanding the important interconnections between psychological and physical processes for health and illness". Among his other honors are the Martica Hall Sleep Medicine Award, Frisca L. Yan Go Award in Sleep Medicine, Charlton Award, and recognition as a Leader in Medicine among "America's Best Doctors."

Irwin's work promoting equity and diversity in science led to the establishment of the Michael Irwin Equity and Diversity Awards by the PNIRS, which he supports philanthropically.

== Early life and education ==
Irwin attended the College of Arts and Sciences at the University of Pennsylvania, where he earned a degree in Biophysics in 1976. He began his medical training at the University of Colorado before transferring to the University of California, San Diego. There, he trained in biochemical genetics and immunology with J. Edwin Seegmiller, completing his medical training in 1981. He then specialized in psychiatry and started research in psychoneuroimmunology with Herbert Weiner, completing his residency in 1985 and receiving the Laughlin Award from the American College of Psychiatrists during his residency.

== Career ==
In 1985, Irwin became a Professor of Psychiatry at the University of California, San Diego where he served until 2001. He then joined UCLA and served as Associate Director of the Semel Institute for Neuroscience and Human Behavior from 2019 to 2021, and concurrently as Vice Chair of Research for the Department of Psychiatry and Biobehavioral Sciences. Since 2009, he has been serving as Director of the Mindful Awareness Research Center as well as Norman Cousins Chair of the Semel Institute, Distinguished Professor of Psychiatry and Biobehavioral Sciences at the David Geffen School of Medicine, and Director of the Cousins Center for Psychoneuroimmunology which was founded by Norman Cousins.

Irwin served as President of PNIRS. Academy of Behavioral Medicine Research, American Psychosomatic Society He holds the title of Distinguished Life Fellow at the American Psychiatric Association and Fellow at the American College of Neuropsychopharmacology.

== Scientific career ==
Irwin has researched psychoneuroimmunologic pathways of disease, mapping reciprocal regulation between neural and innate immune systems, and testing behavioral interventions targeting sleep and inflammatory signaling to promote well-being in older adults and cancer survivors. In collaboration with Kamal Haydari Artin and Michael N Oxman, he evaluated the validity of a briefer 10-item version of the Center for Epidemiological Studies Depression Scale (CES-D) as a screening tool for major depression in older adults, demonstrating excellent sensitivity and specificity. He also participated in a randomized, double-blind, placebo-controlled trial evaluating the effectiveness of a live attenuated varicella-zoster virus vaccine in reducing the burden of illness from herpes zoster and postherpetic neuralgia among older adults.

Irwin is known for providing the first evidence that psychological stress affects immune function and cancer resistance via central neuropeptides and adrenergic pathways. He has also shown that sleep enhances health by boosting antiviral immunity, and reducing inflammatory processes. Additionally, he elucidated the causal role of insomnia and inflammation in regulating affective mechanisms and reward processes leading to depression, a study recognized with the NEATOR Award from the American College of Neuropsychopharmacology in 2016. Having contributed his research to media outlets, he discussed the significant sleep disturbances experienced by individuals with inflammatory bowel disease (IBD), highlighting the complex, bidirectional relationship between sleep quality and IBD. In addition, his Current Biology study on poor sleep's impact on influenza A and Hepatitis A and B vaccines, featured on Advisory Board, revealed reduced antibody response, especially in men.

Irwin's research revealed that community-based mind-body interventions, such as meditation and tai chi, effectively treat insomnia, particularly in older adults and breast cancer survivors. These meditaiton practices were found to especially help older adults experience insomnia and inflation. In a CNN piece, he emphasized the importance of tai chi.

Irwin further demonstrated that tai chi practice enhances antiviral vaccine response and reduces systemic low-grade inflammation by down-regulating inflammatory transcriptional mechanisms, earning him the Basic Research Award from the European Society on Integrative Medicine in 2014. In a commentary, Richard J. Davidson, the American psychologist from University of Wisconsin–Madison and Center for Healthy Minds, stated that Irwin's study "presages a new era for behavioral interventions... such neurally inspired behavioral interventions may represent the future of how we can effect specific alterations in behaviorally relevant neural circuits and systemic biological processes". In addition, he found similar anti-inflammatory benefits following mindfulness meditation.

Later, Irwin's research expanded to demonstrate that treating insomnia can prevent depression. Commentators, Cuijpers and Reynolds described this study as "a completely new and innovative way of tackling the growing problem of depression offering exciting new opportunities for the prevention field and opening a new area of research into indirect preventive interventions for avoiding the stigma of mental disorders".

== Awards and honors ==
- 2007 – Norman Cousins Award, Psychoneuroimmunology Research Society
- 2017 – Charlton Award, Tufts University
- 2017 – Leader in Medicine, American Health Council
- 2018 – George Solomon Memorial Lecture, PNIRS.
- 2020 – Frisca L Yan Go Award in Sleep Medicine, UCLA
- 2023 – Martica Hall Sleep Medicine Award, American Psychosomatic Society

== Selected publications ==
- Irwin, M., Artin, K. H., & Oxman, M. N. (1999). Screening for depression in the older adult: criterion validity of the 10-item Center for Epidemiological Studies Depression Scale (CES-D). Archives of internal medicine, 159(15), 1701-1704.
- Oxman, M. N., Levin, M. J., Johnson, G. R., Schmader, K. E., Straus, S. E., Gelb, L. D., ... & Silber, J. L. (2005). A vaccine to prevent herpes zoster and postherpetic neuralgia in older adults. New England Journal of Medicine, 352(22), 2271-2284.
- Slavich, G. M., & Irwin, M. R. (2014). From stress to inflammation and major depressive disorder: a social signal transduction theory of depression. Psychological bulletin, 140(3), 774.
- Irwin, M. R. (2015). Why sleep is important for health: a psychoneuroimmunology perspective. Annual review of psychology, 66, 143-172.
- Irwin, M. R., Olmstead, R., & Carroll, J. E. (2016). Sleep disturbance, sleep duration, and inflammation: a systematic review and meta-analysis of cohort studies and experimental sleep deprivation. Biological Psychiatry, 80(1), 40-52.
- Irwin, M. R. (2025). Insomnia and Inflammation Conspire to Heighten Depression Risk: Implications for Treatment and Prevention of Mood Disorders. Biological Psychiatry, 98(11), 819-829.
- Irwin, M. R., Boyle, C. C., Cho, J. H., et al. (2025). Insomnia: A Randomized Clinical Trial. JAMA Psychiatry, 82(9), 859-867.
- Irwin, M. R., Olmstead, R., Chen, L., & Haque, R. (2026). Insomnia and elevated risk of major depressive disorder in older adult, long-term breast cancer survivors vs a matched cohort. Sleep, 49(2).
