= Stein Institute for Research on Aging =

US research institute

Coordinates: 32°52′33″N 117°14′02″W

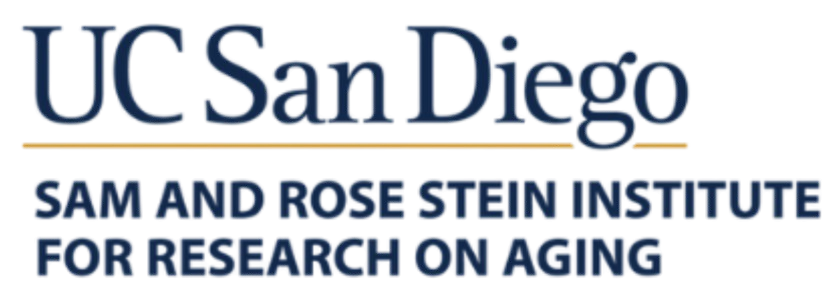
- Established: 1983
- Director: Alison A. Moore, MD, MPH, FACP, AGSF
- Faculty: 150
- Owner: UC San Diego School of Medicine
- Address: 9500 Gilman Drive 0664
- Location: La Jolla, California
- Website: http://www.aging.ucsd.edu

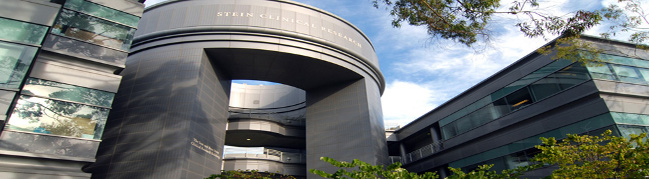
Stein Clinical Research Building where the Institute is housed

The Sam and Rose Stein Institute for Research on Aging (or simply the Stein Institute for Research on Aging) is a non-profit, multidisciplinary research institute at the University of California, San Diego School of Medicine located in La Jolla, California. Established in 1983, it researches healthy aging through the development and application of the latest advances in biomedical and behavioral sciences.

The more than 150 scientists at the Stein Institute are investigating predictors and associations of successful cognitive and emotional aging. Understanding these processes requires contributions from basic sciences like neurobiology and genetics, along with the input from clinical medicine and social sciences, such as medical anthropology.

== History ==
The focus of the Stein Institute's research has shifted over the years since its inception in 1983. In the beginning, the primary emphasis was on Alzheimer's disease. Later, this scope was broadened to include various age-related disorders such as cancer and arthritis. Dilip V. Jeste, taking over as director in 2004 set the Institute's main focus on successful aging.

Alison A. Moore became Director in 2024 with research efforts in geroscience, or the study of factors that drive aging and differences in trajectories of health.

== Activities ==
The Stein Institute has brought together many scientists, encouraged and funded research published in top scientific journals (such as JAMA), supported the education of students, including medical students participating in the National Institute on Aging funded MSTAR program and presented and broadcast about 300 public lectures on aging as part of its community outreach. The number of views and downloads of the Stein lectures from UCSD-TV and UCTV, as well as YouTube and iTunes has exceeded 1.2 million views in the last couple of years. The Institute's work has been cited in the media, including the BBC, New York Times, NPR, U.S. News & World Report, Huffington Post, USA Today, London Times, and Scientific American, among others.

== Successful Aging Evaluation (SAGE) Study ==
Stein Institute has developed the UCSD Successful Aging Evaluation (SAGE) Study - a unique cohort of 1,300 randomly selected people in the San Diego country, ranging in age from 50 to 99, with an oversampling of those over age 80. This longitudinal study focuses on the cognitive and emotional aspects of successful aging, including genetic information about various aspects of aging.

== Directors ==
- 1982-1990 - Jay Seegmiller
- 1990-2004 - Dennis Carson
- 2004–2022- Dilip V. Jeste
- 2022-2024 - Alison A. Moore (Interim)
- 2024-present - Alison A. Moore
