= Ryan Abbott (lawyer) =

British-American academic and attorney

Ryan Abbott is a British-American academic, attorney, physician, acupuncturist, solicitor advocate in England and Wales, writer, and public speaker who is currently professor of law and health sciences at the University of Surrey School of Law, as well as adjunct assistant professor of medicine at the University of California, Los Angeles School of Medicine.

Abbott's research is primarily concerned with the intersection of law and artificial intelligence, intellectual property, and health law.

== Education ==
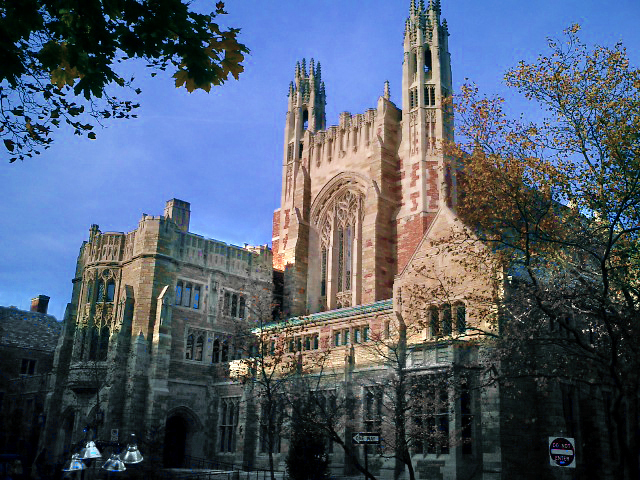
Yale Law School where Prof. Abbott attained his J.D.

Abbott obtained his M.D. from the University of California, San Diego School of Medicine and his J.D. from the Yale Law School. He completed his doctorate at the University of Surrey School of Law. He also attended and graduated summa cum laude from Emperor's College of Traditional Oriental Medicine, receiving a Master of Traditional Oriental Medicine, and from University of California, Los Angeles where he obtained his B.Sc. Abbott is also a licensed acupuncturist.

Abbott is a licensed physician and a member of both the California and New York State bars. He is also a patent attorney registered with the U.S. Patent and Trademark Office and a solicitor advocate (England and Wales).

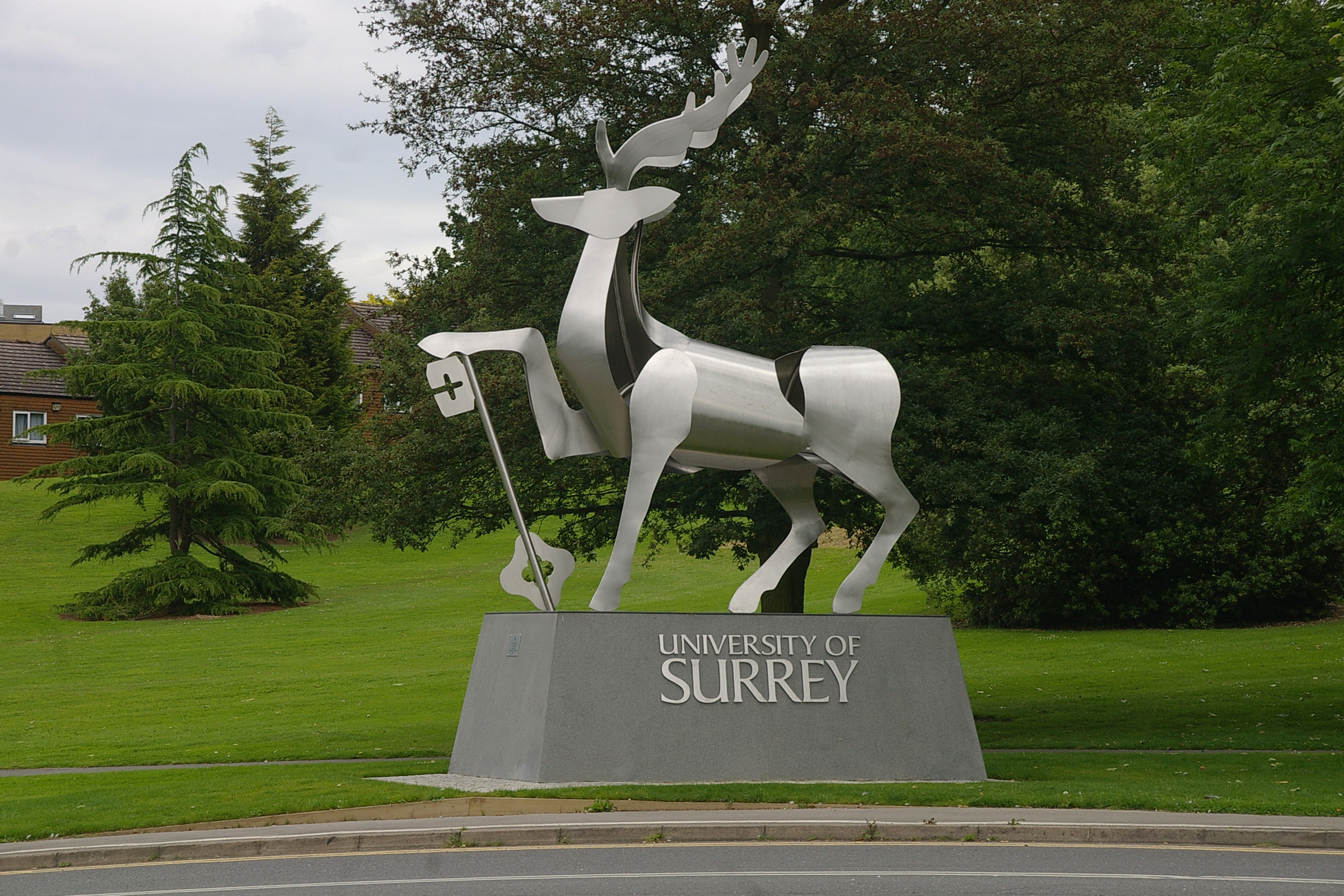
The University of Surrey where Prof. Abbott is currently employed.

== Career ==
=== Academic ===
Abbott is the author of the 2020 book The Reasonable Robot: Artificial Intelligence and the Law, published by Cambridge University Press. In the book, Abbott argues that "the law should not discriminate between AI and human behavior." His works have been covered by publications such as The New York Times and Forbes.

Managing Intellectual Property named Abbott as one of the fifty most influential people in intellectual property in 2019 and in 2021.

=== Practice ===
Abbott leads the Artificial Inventor Project which involves the filing of patent applications for AI output generated without a traditional human inventor.

Abbott has worked as an expert for the World Intellectual Property Organization and the World Health Organization, among other organizations.

== Works ==
=== Books ===
- Abbott, Ryan (2020). The reasonable robot : Artificial Intelligence and the law. Cambridge, United Kingdom: Cambridge University Press. ISBN 978-1-108-63176-1. OCLC 1159122108.
- Abbott, Ryan (2022). Research handbook on intellectual property and artificial intelligence. Cheltenham, UK: Edward Elgar Publishing Limited. ISBN 978-1-80088-190-7. OCLC 1355565583.
