= Artificial Inventor Project =

Initiative about AI-generated inventions

The Artificial Inventor Project (AIP) is a global legal initiative headed by Professor Ryan Abbott dedicated to pursuing intellectual property (IP) rights for inventions and creative works generated autonomously by artificial intelligence (AI) systems without traditional human inventorship or authorship. The project coordinates a series of pro bono test cases worldwide, aiming to prompt law reform and public debate on how IP law should accommodate non-human creators.

== History ==
In 2019, AIP filed patent applications in multiple jurisdictions, including the United States, United Kingdom, European Patent Office, Australia, Switzerland, and South Africa, naming the AI system DABUS (Device for the Autonomous Bootstrapping of Unified Sentience), created by Stephen Thaler, as the inventor.

The aim was to challenge legal norms that require inventors to be natural persons and highlight pressing policy questions about AI-generated innovation and IP regimes.

== Legal proceedings by jurisdiction ==
=== Australia ===
In July 2021, a Federal Court of Australia judge (Beach J) ruled that AI can be considered an inventor under the Patents Act 1990, ordering IP Australia to reinstate the relevant patent. However, the full court then overturned this ruling on appeal and denied further review.

=== European Patent Office ===
The EPO Board of Appeal determined in 2022 that only a human inventor may be named, rendering DABUS‑based applications unacceptable.

=== South Africa ===
In 2021, a patent was granted listing DABUS as the inventor. As South Africa’s procedural system does not involve substantive inventorship review, the grant proceeded on formal grounds alone.

=== Switzerland ===
On 26 June 2025, the Swiss Federal Administrative Court ruled that artificial intelligence systems such as DABUS cannot be listed as inventors on patent applications. The court upheld the existing practice of the Swiss Federal Institute of Intellectual Property (IPI), affirming that only natural persons may be recognized as inventors under Swiss patent law.

=== United Kingdom ===
In December 2023, the UK Supreme Court unanimously held that AI systems cannot be legally recognized as inventors, affirming that "an inventor must be a person" under current British law.

=== United States ===
In Thaler v. Hirshfeld (2021), a U.S. federal court agreed with the USPTO that inventors must be natural persons, rejecting the DABUS application and setting a precedent consistent with existing statute and administrative policy.

== Criticism and impact ==
The project has fueled substantial discourse. Critics caution that allowing AI inventorship may complicate notions of accountability and ownership. Proponents argue that legal recognition must evolve to avoid disincentivizing innovation produced by AI and to maintain honesty about the true source of invention.
