= Wisdom =

Combination of wit and virtue

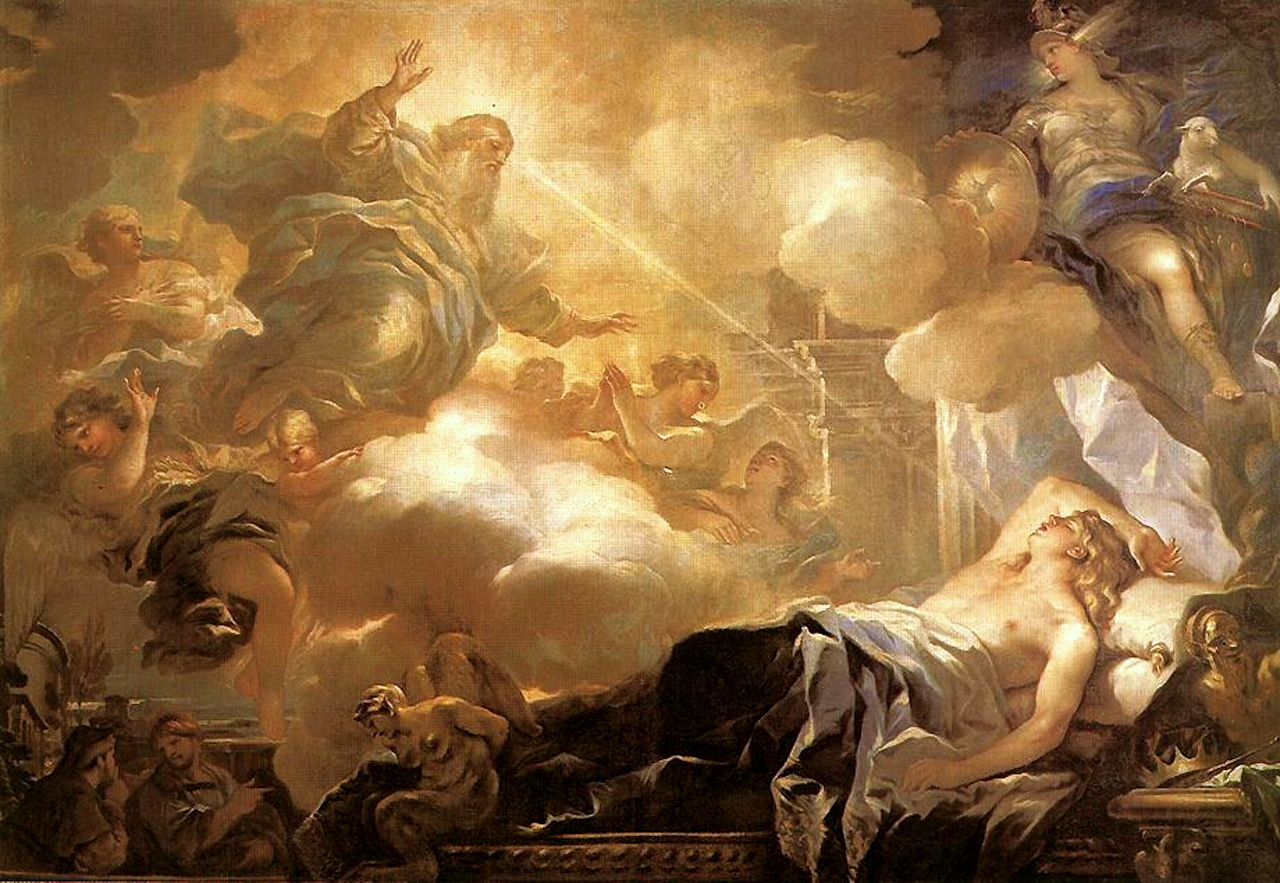
Luca Giordano: The Dream of Solomon: God promises Solomon wisdom

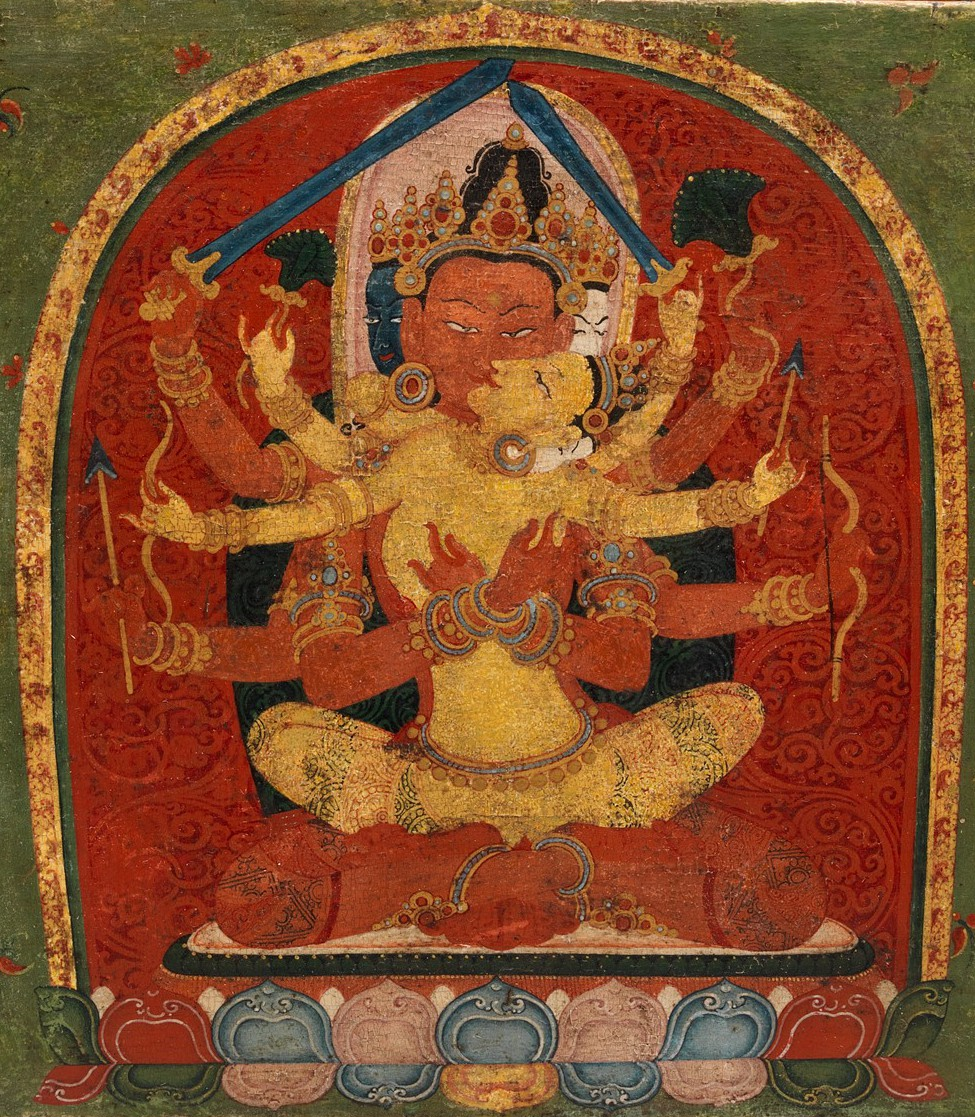
Tibetan book cover depicting Prajñāpāramitā Devi and Mañjuśrī in yab yum, late 13th century

Wisdom, also known as sapience, is defined by psychologists as a combination of "wit and virtue," (Note: Zhang, Shi & Wang (2023, p. 15036): "For example, Stern-berg (2019b) argued that the goal of wisdom, which involves intelligence, creativity, and knowledge base, is the common good. The view that wisdom is an integration of virtue and wit is recognized by all wisdom theories. However, it is only a veil that has yet to be lifted. For example, Baltes and Staudinger (2000) argues that wisdom is "the perfect integration of mind and virtue". Similarly, Grossmann et al. (2020) proposed a common wisdom model, which includes two elements: Meta-cognition and moral aspirations. They defined wisdom in empirical sci-ences as "morally-grounded excellence in certain aspects of meta-cognition".") the ability to apply expert tacit and experiential knowledge, balancing intrapersonal, interpersonal and institutional interests, to deal with complex questions of life and attain a common good. Wisdom can be viewed as a stable personality trait, but also as a context-bound process, meaning that a person in some contexts behaves wisely, but in other contexts does not. (Note: Zhang, Shi & Wang (2023, p. 15031): "According to Grossmann (2017a), wisdom is a property characteristic of individuals in situations rather than a personal excellence—whether or not a person is wise depends on the situation, and there is no general wisdom factor (w-factor) analogous to Spearman's g (Sternberg, 2019a). We agree with Grossmann that there is no pan-situational wisdom factor and firmly believe that human wisdom manifests in particular domains. For example, Martin Luther King, Mohandas Gandhi and Albert Einstein show great wisdom in their careers, but not in their personal lives (Sternberg, 2019a), which proving that most people's wisdom is domain specific, with very few possessing general wisdom, let alone universal wisdom in all times and places." Compare James W. Fowlers "Universalizing faith", hypothesizing a generalisation of altruistic behaviour beyond one's personal sphere of influence; Fowler saw these kind of persons as exemplifying "universal faith.") Wisdom can also be viewed as influenced and determined by sociocultural norms and traditions. Wisdom can be viewed solely as wise behaviour, describing actions which lead to "an altruistic outcome by creatively and successfully solving problems."

Throughout history, wisdom has been regarded as a key virtue in religion and philosophy. Religiously, wisdom is an important element in the Biblical wisdom-tradition - often contrasting human knowledge with divine omniscience - which was further developed in Christianity and Islam. In Mahayana Buddhism, prajna (insight, "wisdom") is wedded to karuṇā, compassion, as icographically represented in yab-yum. Philosophically, wisdom has been explored by thinkers from Ancient Greece to modern times, with Greek (Plato) making a distinction between sophia, philosophical and contemplative wisdom regarding the divine order of existence; phronesis, practical wisdom; and episteme, formal or scientific knowledge.

Psychologists have researched wisdom since the late 1970s, starting with exploring folk conceptions of wisdom, and subsequently developing explicit-formal theories of wisdom. Theories that regard wisdom as a developmental cognitive and personal trait hark back to Erik Erikson's theory of stages of psychosocial development, and post-formal stages added to Jean Piagets theory of cognitive development. Explicit-formal theories include Robert J. Sternbergs Balance Theory of Wisdom, which explores the relation between intelligence, creativity, and wisdom, and sees wisdom as "the value-laden application of tacit knowledge to attain a common good"; and Paul Baltes' Berlin Wisdom Paradigm, which sees wisdom as a combination of "excellence in mind and virtue" and "an expert knowledge system dealing with the conduct and understanding of life." Psychological definitions include two common components, namely wit and virtue: an emphasis on cognition, meaning, and affect, and a concern for human welfare.

== Etymology ==
The English word wisdom originates from the Old English wīsdōm, which is derived from wīs ("wise") and dōm ("judgment, decision, law"). The Proto-Germanic root wis- ("to see, to know") connects wisdom to perception and insight. Related terms appear in Old High German (wīssag, "prophetic"), Old Norse (vísdómr), and Gothic (weisdumbs).

In Ancient Greek, wisdom is expressed as σοφία (sophia), often referring to both practical skill and philosophical insight. The term was central to Greek philosophy, particularly in Plato's and Aristotle's discussions on virtue. The Latin equivalent, sapientia, derives from sapere ("to taste, to discern"), emphasizing wisdom as discerning between right and wrong.

In Sanskrit jñāna (ज्ञान) and viveka (विवेक) refer to knowledge and insight, and discernment or discrimination.

Similar concepts exist in non-Indo-European languages:

- Hebrew: Chokhmah (חָכְמָה) in the Hebrew Bible is linked to divine and moral wisdom.
- Chinese: Zhì (智) represents wisdom as practical intelligence, central to Confucian ethics.

== Definitions ==
=== Dictionary definitions ===
- Merriam-Webster: "ability to discern inner qualities and relationships"; "good sense"
- Cambridge dictionary: "the ability to use your knowledge and experience to make good decisions and judgments"
- Oxford English Dictionary:

- "Capacity of judging rightly in matters relating to life and conduct; soundness of judgement in the choice of means and ends; sometimes, less strictly, sound sense, esp. in practical affairs: opposed to folly";
- "Knowledge (esp. of a high or abstruse kind); enlightenment, learning, erudition; in early use often = philosophy, science. †Also, practical knowledge or understanding, expertness in an art. Now historical."

- The Britannica Dictionary: "knowledge that is gained by having many experiences in life"; " the natural ability to understand things that most other people cannot understand"; "knowledge of what is proper or reasonable"; " good sense or judgment"

== Western religion and mythology ==
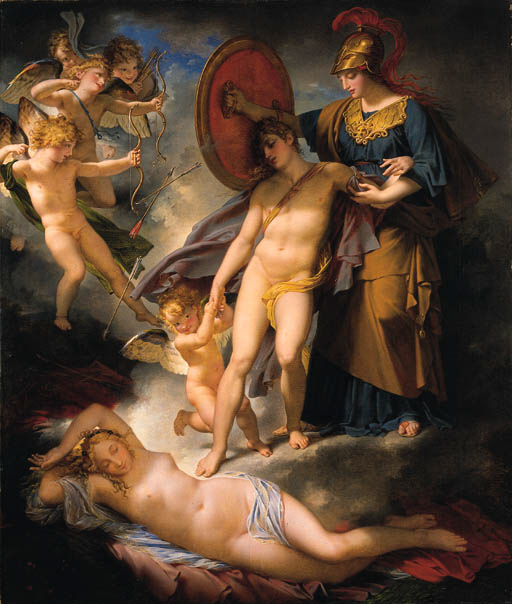
Wisdom Defending Youth against Love by Meynier, c. 1810

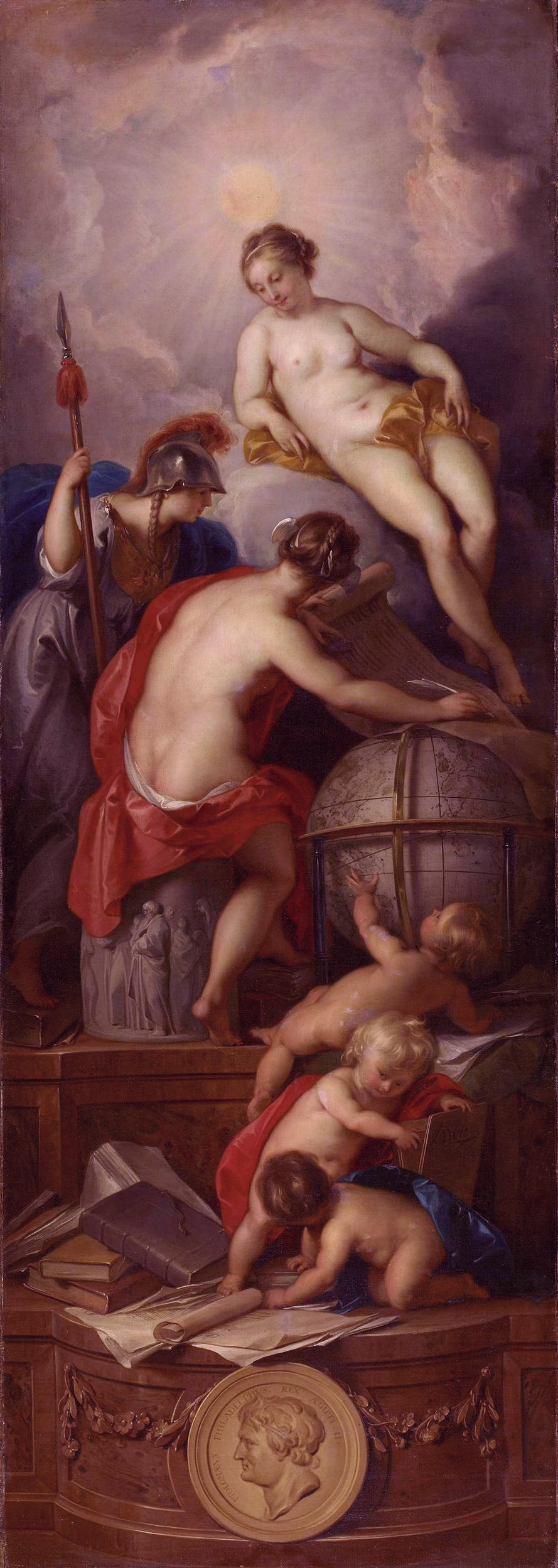
Truth and Wisdom assist History in writing by Jacob de Wit, 1754

=== Mesopotamian mythology ===
The earliest wisdom literature comes from Sumerian and Egyptian texts. In Sumerian tradition, wisdom (me) was considered a divine principle given by the gods, recorded in proverbs and myths. In Mesopotamian religion and mythology, Enki, also known as Ea, was the god of wisdom and intelligence. Divine wisdom allowed the provident designation of functions and the ordering of the cosmos, and it was achieved by humans by following mes (in Sumerian: order, rite, righteousness) which maintain balance. In addition to hymns to Enki or Ea dating from the third millennium BCE, there is among the clay tablets of Abu Salabikh from 2600 BCE (the oldest dated texts), a "Hymn to Shamash" which includes the following:

Wide is the courtyard of Shamash night chamber, (just as wide is the womb of) a wise pregnant woman! Sin, his warrior, wise one, heard of the offerings and came down to his fiesta. He is the father of the nation and the father of intelligence.

=== Egyptian mythology ===
Egyptian wisdom texts, such as the Maxims of Ptahhotep (c. 2400 BCE), emphasized moral conduct and social harmony.

Sia was the personification of perception and thoughtfulness in the mythology of Ancient Egypt. Thoth, married to Maat (in ancient Egyptian: order, righteousness, truth), was regarded as the being who introduced wisdom to the nation.

The concept of Logos – manifest word of the divine thought – was also present in the philosophy and hymns of Egypt and Ancient Greece. It was important in the thinking of Heraclitus, and in the Abrahamic traditions. It seems to have been derived from Mesopotamian culture.

=== Judaism ===
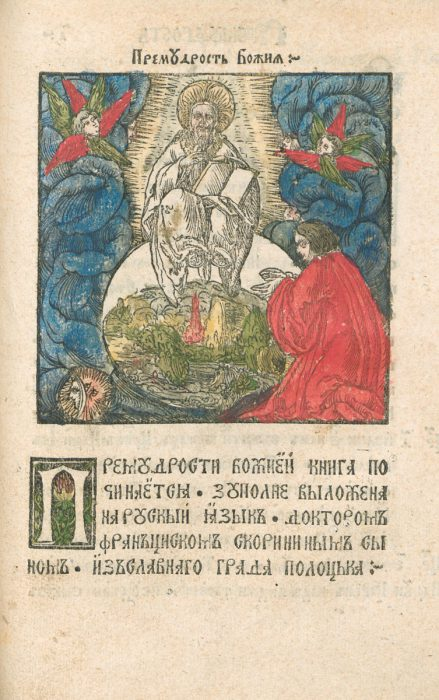
Image from "Book of Wisdom" of Francysk Skaryna 1518

Biblical wisdom literature includes the Proverbs, Ecclesiastes, and Job, which depict wisdom as both divine and practical, often contrasting human knowledge with divine omniscience.

The word "wisdom" (Chokmah (חָכְמָה), from the Hebrew root חכם) is mentioned 222 times in the Hebrew Bible. It was regarded as one of the highest virtues among the Israelites along with kindness (חסד) and justice (צדק). Wisdom is exemplified by Solomon. Much of the Book of Proverbs, which is filled with wise sayings, is attributed to Solomon. The Talmud teaches that a wise person can foresee the future. Nolad is a Hebrew word for "future," but also the Hebrew word for "birth", so one rabbinic interpretation of the teaching is that a wise person is one who can foresee the consequences of his/her choices (i.e. can "see the future" that he/she "gives birth" to).

=== Greek mythology ===
==== Athena and Metis ====
Athena (as Mentor) supported him by recognizing and fostering courage, hope, sense, bravery, and adeptness (Homer, trans. 1996, p. 102).

— Sommer

The ancient Greeks considered wisdom to be an important virtue, personified as the goddesses Metis and Athena. Metis was the first wife of Zeus, who, according to Hesiod's Theogony, had devoured her pregnant; Zeus earned the title of Mêtieta ("The Wise Counselor") after that, as Metis was the embodiment of wisdom, and he gave birth to Athena, who is said to have sprung from his head. Athena was portrayed as strong, fair, merciful, and chaste.

==== Apollo ====
Apollo was also considered a god of wisdom, designated as the conductor of the Muses (Musagetes), who were personifications of the sciences and of the inspired and poetic arts. According to Plato in his Cratylus, the name of Apollo could also mean "ballon" (archer) and "omopoulon" (unifier of poles [divine and earthly]), since this god was responsible for divine and true inspirations, thus considered an archer who was always right in healing and oracles: "he is an ever-darting archer". Apollo prophesied through the priestesses (Pythia) in the Temple of Apollo (Delphi), where the aphorism "know thyself" (gnōthi seauton) (Note: Critias states the meaning of "know thyself" in Plato's Charmides (165a)) was inscribed (one of the Delphic maxims). He was contrasted with Hermes, who was related to the sciences and technical wisdom, and, in the first centuries after Christ, was associated with Thoth in an Egyptian syncretism, under the name Hermes Trimegistus. Greek tradition recorded the earliest introducers of wisdom in the Seven Sages of Greece.

=== Roman mythology ===
The ancient Romans also valued wisdom, which was personified as Minerva or Pallas. She also represents skillful knowledge and the virtues, especially chastity. Her symbol was the owl, which is still a popular representation of wisdom, because it can see in darkness. She was said to have been born from Jupiter's forehead.

=== Hellenistic religion and Gnosticism ===
In Hellenistic religion, wisdom was often personified as a divine or mystical force guiding human understanding. In Greek mystery religions, particularly Orphism and the Eleusinian Mysteries, wisdom was associated with spiritual enlightenment and initiation into hidden truths. Philosophical movements such as Neoplatonism developed a concept of wisdom (sophia, σοφία) as the knowledge of the divine order of existence. Plotinus (204–270 CE) viewed wisdom as an ascent of the soul towards the One, the ultimate source of all reality. In this tradition, wisdom was both intellectual and mystical, requiring inner purification to grasp transcendent truths.

=== Christianity ===
In Christian theology, "wisdom" describes an aspect of God, or the theological concept regarding the wisdom of God. Wisdom is considered one of the seven gifts of the Holy Spirit. Justin Martyr, Athenagoras of Athens and Theophilus of Antioch identified the Wisdom of the Book of Proverbs with the Word who is Jesus Christ God.

=== Gnosticism ===
Wisdom also played a central role in Gnosticism, an esoteric movement that emerged in the first few centuries CE. Gnostics saw wisdom (Sophia) as a divine figure, often depicted as a fallen being who sought to restore humanity's knowledge of its divine origin. In texts in the Nag Hammadi library, Sophia is described as the mother of all living and the source of gnosis (spiritual knowledge). According to Valentinian Gnosticism, Sophia's fall led to the creation of the material world, but through wisdom, the soul could transcend illusion and return to the divine realm.

Gnostic texts such as the Pistis Sophia depict wisdom as a cosmic force struggling to free itself from ignorance and darkness. This contrasts with orthodox Christian views, where wisdom (σοφία) is associated with the Logos and divine order rather than cosmic dualism. In Hermeticism, another esoteric tradition of the Hellenistic period, wisdom was linked to inner enlightenment and mystical union with the divine mind (nous, νοῦς). These traditions, though diverse, shared the belief that wisdom was the key to transcending material existence and reuniting with the divine.

=== Islam ===
In Islamic philosophy the Arabic term hikmah (حكمة) refers to wisdom as both divine insight and rational philosophy, deeply influenced by Aristotle, Avicenna, and Al-Farabi. Prophets of Islam are believed by Muslims to possess great wisdom. The Sufi philosopher Ibn Arabi considers al-Hakim ("The Wise") as one of the names of the Creator. Wisdom and truth, considered divine attributes, were valued in Islamic sciences and philosophy. The first Arab philosopher, Al-Kindi says at the beginning of his book:

We must not be ashamed to admire the truth or to acquire it, from wherever it comes. Even if it should come from far-flung nations and foreign peoples, there is for the student of truth nothing more important than the truth, nor is the truth demeaned or diminished by the one who states or conveys it; no one is demeaned by the truth, rather all are ennobled by it.

— Al-Kindi, On First Philosophy

=== Norse mythology ===
Odin is known for his wisdom, often as acquired through various hardships and ordeals involving pain and self-sacrifice. In one instance he plucked out an eye and offered it to Mímir, guardian of the well of knowledge and wisdom, in return for a drink from the well.

In another famous account, Odin hanged himself for nine nights from Yggdrasil, the World Tree that unites all the realms of existence, suffering from hunger and thirst and finally wounding himself with a spear until he gained the knowledge of runes for use in casting powerful magic. He was also able to acquire the mead of poetry from the giants, a drink of which could grant the power of a scholar or poet, for the benefit of gods and mortals alike.

=== In folklore ===
In many cultures, the name for third molars, which are the last teeth to grow, is etymologically linked with wisdom, as in the English wisdom tooth. This nickname originated from the classical tradition – the Hippocratic writings used the term sóphronistér (in Greek, related to the meaning of moderation or teaching a lesson), and in Latin dens sapientiae (wisdom tooth).

== Eastern traditions ==
=== Zoroastrianism ===
In the Avesta Gathas, hymns traditionally attributed to Zoroaster, Ahura Mazda means "Lord" (Ahura) and "Wisdom" (Mazda), and is the central deity who embodies goodness, being also called "Good Thought" (Vohu Manah). In Zoroastrianism, the order of the universe and morals is called asha (in Avestan, truth, righteousness), which is determined by this omniscient Thought and also considered a deity emanating from Ahura (Amesha Spenta). It is related to another ahura deity, Spenta Mainyu (active Mentality). It says in Yazna 31:

To him shall the best befall, who, as one that knows, speaks to me Right's truthful word of Welfare and of Immortality; even the Dominion of Mazda which Good Thought shall increase for him. About which he in the beginning thus thought, "let the blessed realms be filled with Light", he it is that by his wisdom created Right.

=== Buddhism and Hinduism - prajñā and karuna ===
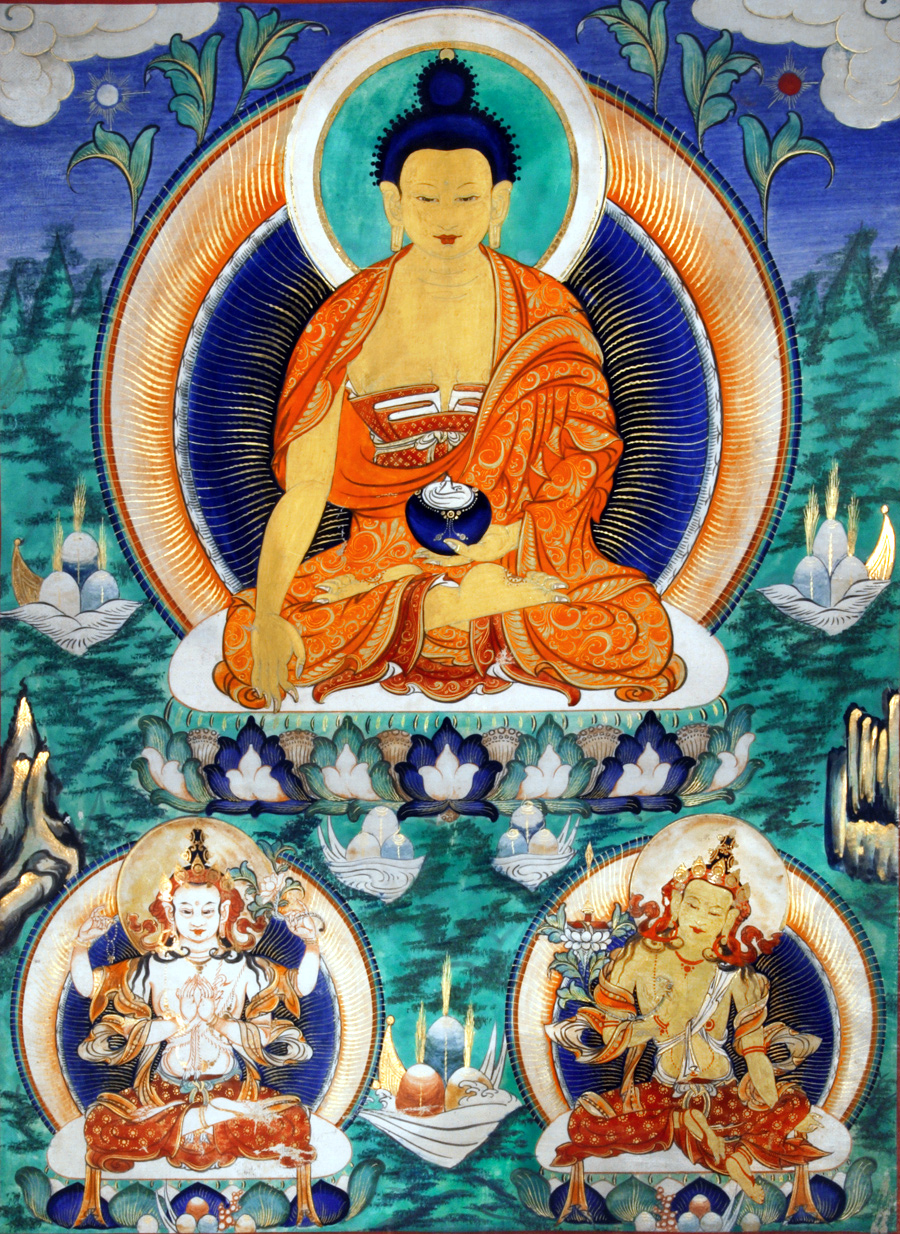
Shakyamuni Buddha flanked by Chenrezig (Avalokiteśvara, bodhisattva of compassion) and Manjushri (bodhisttva of wisdom).

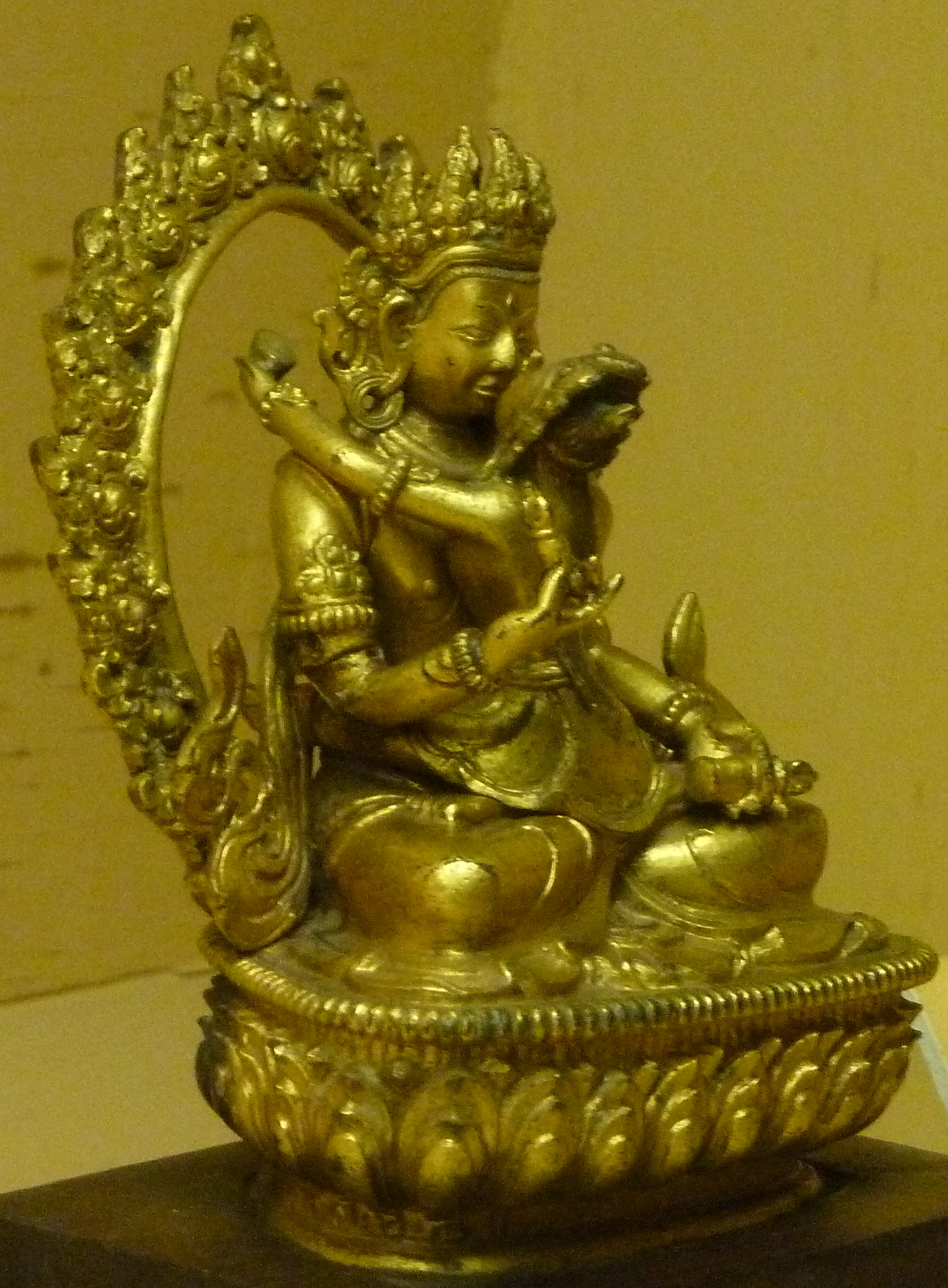
Padmasambhava in yab-yum, which represents the primordial union of wisdom and compassion. The male figure is usually linked to compassion and skillful means, while the female partner relates to insight.

In Indian religions and philosophy, prajna is often translated as "wisdom," but is closer in meaning to "insight", "non-discriminating knowledge" or "intuitive apprehension." The term prajñā was translated into Chinese as 智慧 (pinyin zhìhuì, characters 智 "knowledge" and 慧 "bright, intelligent").

In Theravada Buddhism, prajñā (प्रज्ञा); wisdom, understanding, intelligence) is "seeing things as they are," or gaining a "penetrative understanding of all phenomena", which in turn is described as ultimately leading to nirvana and the "complete freedom from suffering". Prajñā is equivalent to vipassanā (insight), the realization of impermanence (anicca), suffering (duḥkha), and non-self (anattā); vipassanā is developed in tandem with samatha, "calm."

In Mahayana Buddhism, wisdom is often personified by the Bodhisattva Manjushri, who wields a sword to cut through ignorance, and is associated with Karuṇā, compassion, as iconographically represented in Yab-Yum.

In Hinduism, jñāna (ज्ञान, knowledge, insight) is closely associated with insight into the ultimate nature of reality (Brahman, ब्रह्मन्) and the self (Ātman, आत्मन्).

=== Baháʼí Faith ===
In Baháʼí Faith scripture, "The essence of wisdom is the fear of God, the dread of His scourge and punishment, and the apprehension of His justice and decree." Wisdom is seen as a light that casts away darkness, and "its dictates must be observed under all circumstances". One may obtain knowledge and wisdom through God, his Word, and his Divine Manifestation; the source of all learning is the knowledge of God.

=== Taoism ===
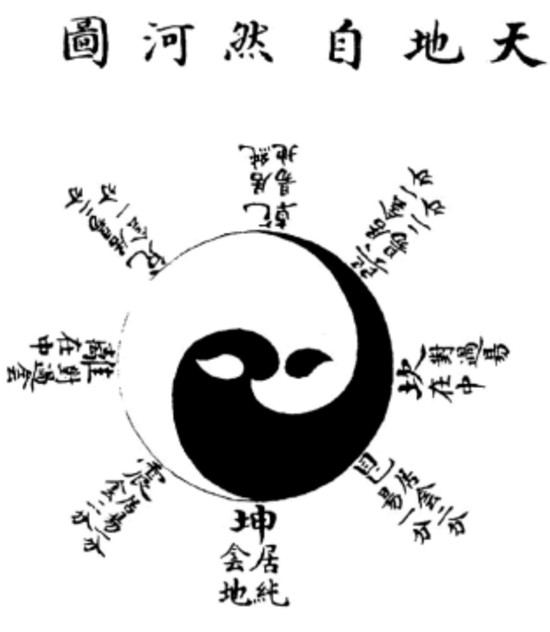
Bagua diagram from Zhao Huiqian's Liushu benyi, c. 1370s

Taoist views of 'effortless acting' (wu wei, 無為) emphasizes effortless action, aligning with the natural flow of the universe (Tao). While early Confucianism values social harmony and structured virtue, Taoist wisdom often embraces paradox and non-conformity. The Zhuangzi text, attributed to Zhuang Zhou (c. 4th century BCE), presents wisdom as a state of effortless flow (wu wei), where one aligns with the spontaneous patterns of nature rather than imposing human will. This contrasts with Confucian ideals of ritual and duty, as Taoist wisdom values freedom from rigid thinking and acceptance of change.

Taoist wisdom also includes cosmological insight, recognizing that all things emerge from the Tao (道), the fundamental force of existence. In Tao Te Ching (道德經), attributed to Laozi (6th century BCE), wisdom is described as yielding like water, able to overcome obstacles through gentleness rather than force. This perspective aligns with Taoist ethics, which discourage aggression and rigid control, instead promoting a harmonious existence in sync with nature's rhythms. He also describes wisdom as understanding the balance of opposites (Yin and Yang) and acting in harmony with nature rather than imposing force.

Unlike Western views, Taoist wisdom often involves paradox and non-action, valuing spontaneity over rigid rules. Taoist sages are often depicted as detached from worldly concerns, seeking a deeper, wordless understanding of existence that transcends conventional logic.

=== Confucianism ===
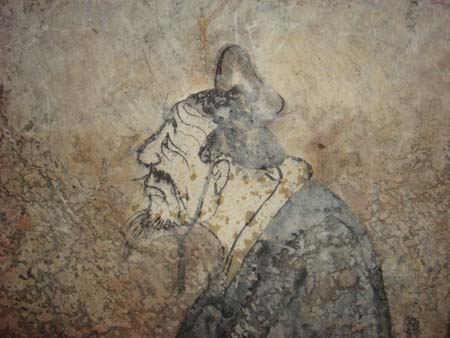
Confucius in a fresco from a Western Han tomb in Dongping, Shandong

In Confucian thought, wisdom (zhi, 智) is closely linked to ethical living and social harmony. Confucius (551–479 BCE) taught that wisdom is not merely intelligence but the ability to act virtuously in relationships and governance. It involves self-cultivation, learning from the past, and practicing benevolence (ren, 仁), which Confucius regarded as a foundational virtue.

Wisdom in Confucianism is practical and moral, requiring individuals to cultivate righteousness (yi, 義) and ritual propriety (li, 禮) in order to contribute to a stable society. The ideal wise person, or "superior person" (junzi, 君子), embodies wisdom by continuously refining their character and aligning their actions with ethical principles.

Later Confucian thinkers expanded on this concept. Mencius (372–289 BCE) emphasized compassion and moral intuition as sources of wisdom, arguing that humans are naturally inclined toward goodness but must develop wisdom through education and reflection. Xunzi (c. 310–235 BCE), by contrast, saw wisdom as the product of strict discipline and adherence to ritual, believing that human nature is inherently flawed and must be shaped through deliberate effort.

The Confucian approach to wisdom remains influential in East Asian ethics, education, and leadership philosophy, continuing to shape modern discussions on morality and governance.

== Western philosophy ==
Philosophers have explored wisdom as a fundamental concept for millennia, debating its nature, acquisition, and role in ethical and intellectual life. Some traditions emphasize wisdom as practical decision-making, while others frame it as deep contemplation or spiritual insight. Broadly, wisdom or intelligence has been categorized into sophia, philosophical and contemplative wisdom; phronesis, "practical wisdom shown by statesmen and legislators"; and episteme, understanding phenomena from a scientific point of view.

=== Ancient Greek philosophy ===
Wisdom (sophia, σοφία) played a central role in Ancient Greek philosophy and was often distinguished from mere knowledge (episteme, ἐπιστήμη).

==== Socrates ====
According to Plato and Xenophon, the Pythia of the Delphic Oracle answered the question "who is the wisest man in Greece?" by stating Socrates was the wisest. According to Plato's Apology, Socrates (469–399 BCE) decided to investigate the people who might be considered wiser than him, concluding they lacked true knowledge. He argued that true wisdom involves questioning and refining beliefs rather than assuming certainty:

τούτου μὲν τοῦ ἀνθρώπου ἐγὼ σοφώτερός εἰμι: κινδυνεύει μὲν γὰρ ἡμῶν οὐδέτερος οὐδὲν καλὸν κἀγαθὸν εἰδέναι, ἀλλ᾽ οὗτος μὲν οἴεταί τι εἰδέναι οὐκ εἰδώς, ἐγὼ δέ, ὥσπερ οὖν οὐκ οἶδα, οὐδὲ οἴομαι: ἔοικα γοῦν τούτου γε σμικρῷ τινι αὐτῷ τούτῳ σοφώτερος εἶναι, ὅτι ἃ μὴ οἶδα οὐδὲ οἴομαι εἰδέναι.

Translation:

I am wiser than this man; for neither of us really knows anything fine and good, but this man thinks he knows something when he does not, whereas I, as I do not know anything, do not think I do either.

This became immortalized in the phrase "I know that I know nothing", an aphorism suggesting that it is wise to recognize one's own ignorance and to value epistemic humility.

==== Plato and Aristotle ====
To Socrates and his student Plato (c. 427–347 BCE), philosophy was literally the love of wisdom (philo-sophia). This permeates Plato's dialogues; in The Republic the leaders of his proposed utopia are philosopher kings who, through education and contemplation, attain a deep understanding of justice and the Forms, and possess the courage to act accordingly.

Aristotle (384–322 BCE), in Metaphysics, defined wisdom as understanding why things are a certain way (causality), which is deeper than merely knowing things are a certain way. He was the first to differentiate between two types of wisdom:

- Theoretical wisdom (sophia), which involves deep contemplation of universal truths.
- Practical wisdom (phronesis), which is the ability to make sound decisions in everyday life.

Aristotle saw phronesis as essential for ethical living, arguing that virtuous actions require both knowledge and experience. This concept of practical wisdom later influenced virtue ethics and modern discussions of decision-making.

=== Roman philosophy ===
In Roman philosophy, wisdom (sapientia) was regarded as the virtue of the Stoic sage. Cicero and Seneca viewed wisdom as self-discipline and rational living, essential for achieving inner tranquility (ataraxia).

=== Medieval and Renaissance thought ===
In the Medieval period, wisdom was often linked to divine revelation and theology. Augustine of Hippo (354–430 CE) viewed wisdom as knowledge aligned with God's eternal truth, distinguishing it from mere worldly intelligence. He argued that true wisdom (sapientia) comes from knowing and loving God, contrasting it with human knowledge (scientia), which concerns temporal matters.

Thomas Aquinas built upon Aristotle's distinction between theoretical and practical wisdom, incorporating it into Christian theology. He argued that wisdom (sapientia) is the highest intellectual virtue, guiding reason toward ultimate truth and divine understanding. Aquinas distinguished between natural wisdom, which humans acquire through reason, and supernatural wisdom, which comes through divine revelation.

During the Renaissance, humanist thinkers such as Erasmus and Montaigne emphasized the role of self-reflection and skepticism in wisdom, challenging dogmatic reliance on authority. Montaigne, in his Essays, proposed that true wisdom lies in acknowledging uncertainty and maintaining intellectual humility. The Renaissance emphasis on human reason and critical inquiry laid the groundwork for early modern philosophical discussions of wisdom.

=== Modern and contemporary philosophy ===
In the Age of Enlightenment, the concept of wisdom shifted from religious and metaphysical frameworks to one rooted in rationality and moral duty. Immanuel Kant argued that wisdom involves the application of practical reason to align one's actions with universal moral principles. He distinguished between theoretical reason, which seeks knowledge for its own sake, and practical reason, which applies knowledge ethically. Kantian wisdom involves making decisions that conform to the categorical imperative, a moral law derived from reason.

During the 19th century, romanticism and existentialism challenged the rationalist foundations of wisdom. Friedrich Nietzsche criticized traditional views of wisdom as passive contemplation and obedience to moral codes. Instead, he championed "life-affirming wisdom", emphasizing personal growth through struggle and self-overcoming. Nietzsche rejected the pursuit of static truths, instead advocating for a dynamic and self-created form of wisdom.

Existentialist philosophers further expanded this critique. Jean-Paul Sartre viewed wisdom as a confrontation with the absurd condition of life and the freedom to create meaning in a world devoid of inherent purpose. Albert Camus echoed these ideas in The Myth of Sisyphus, arguing that wisdom lies in accepting life's absurdity and choosing to live meaningfully despite its challenges.

In the 20th century, pragmatist philosophers like John Dewey argued for a form of wisdom based on adaptability and practical decision-making. Dewey rejected fixed moral absolutes in favor of wisdom as a constantly evolving process of inquiry and experimentation. Pragmatic wisdom, according to Dewey, emerges from ongoing reflection on experience and the ability to adapt principles to changing contexts. Following Dewey's lead, Robert L. Holmes argued that wisdom in the modern nuclear era calls for individuals to transcend the dogmatic use of fixed philosophical principles such as just wars and unjust wars by resolving military conflict through the use of "pragmatic pacifism" instead.

Meanwhile, virtue ethicists such as Martha Nussbaum argue that wisdom is tied to emotional intelligence and empathy. In her works on Aristotelian ethics, Nussbaum writes that wise individuals understand the complexities of human emotions and integrate them into moral reasoning. Similarly, Richard Clyde Taylor argued that wisdom is characterized by compassionate understanding when accompanied by the realization that, "there simply is no such thing as philosophical knowledge, nor any philosophical way of knowing anything." This perspective sees wisdom not merely as intellectual discernment but as the capacity to recognize the emotional and contextual dimensions of moral life.

In the realm of epistemology, other 20th century philosophers also drew inspiration from the sweeping critique of "conventional wisdom" outlined by Socrates in his rejoinder to arguments presented by Cebes in his Phaedo. In this view, philosophical wisdom does not necessarily result from devotion to a particular intellectual school of thought and is more accurately characterized as the attainment of a form of intellectual humility through the use of dialectic. In a similar manner, several contemporary philosophers argue that wisdom serves to clarify the manner in which ancient dead metaphors continue to cloud mankind's attainment of knowledge and our understanding of events in general. By "unmasking" the persistent use of "disguised" conceptual metaphors in everyday language, these philosophers suggest that systematic philosophical dogmas can be more readily transcended in the pursuit of more useful models of reality. Included among this group are the scholars Colin Murray Turbayne and Kendall Walton.

Other contemporary philosophers uncovered new insights into wisdom as applied to the study of ontology within a paradigm of a modern "secular philosophy". Following Immanuel Kant's lead, Lewis White Beck argued that the analysis of wisdom found within the works of Thomas Acquinas, Blaise Pascal, Soren Kierkegaard, and William James allows one to avoid the criticisms raised by Karl Marx, Friedrich Nietzsche and the Logical Positivists against Plato's mystical concept of the hidden "unknowable beyond." Due to its historical existential importance, such a concept cannot be dismissed merely as a product of mankind's imagination or blindly embraced on purely dogmatic grounds. Citing Immanuel Kant's description of the "land of truth," Beck argued that mankind can transcend this apparent duality by acknowledging a purely limited knowledge of the "unknowable beyond" in accordance with the dictates of philosophical wisdom whenever it is accompanied by an act of pure faith.

Postmodern philosophers challenge the notion of wisdom as a universal concept. Michel Foucault argued that ideas of wisdom are shaped by power structures and are inherently subjective, often serving to reinforce dominant ideologies. Postmodern perspectives emphasize cultural relativism and the diversity of wisdom across historical and social contexts rather than a singular definition.

Today, contemporary discussions of wisdom draw from cognitive science and social philosophy. Philosophers like Philip Kitcher focus on practical wisdom as collaborative decision-making in democratic societies. This view holds that wisdom is not an individual trait but a collective process involving diverse perspectives. As such, modern philosophy views wisdom as dynamic, context-dependent, and shaped by emotional, social, and cognitive factors.

== Psychological research ==
Psychological research on wisdom began in the late 1970s, and numerous explicit-formal theories on wisdom have been developed.

=== Definitions ===
There is no scientific consensus on the definition of wisdom, and the existing psychological definitions of wisdom vary. There are a large number of definitions, (Note: See Zhang, Shi & Wang (2023, pp. 15033–15035) for an extensive overview of definitions.) but some are:

- Holiday and Chandler (1986) found that wisdom is related to five underlying factors: "exceptional understanding, judgment and communication skills, general competence, interpersonal skills, and social unobtrusiveness".
- Baltes, Glück and Kunzmann (2001): "the ability to deal with the contradictions of a specific situation and to assess the consequences of an action for themselves and for others. It is achieved when in a concrete situation, a balance between intrapersonal, interpersonal and institutional interests can be prepared".
- Sternberg (2003): wisdom is "the value-laden application of tacit knowledge not only for one's own benefit (as can be the case with successful intelligence), but also for the benefit of others, in order to attain a common good. The wise person realizes that what matters is not just knowledge, or the intellectual skills one applies to this knowledge, but how the knowledge is used."
- Brown and Greene (2006): "wisdom is an expertise in dealing with difficult questions of life and adaptation to the complex requirements."
- Baltes and Smith (2008): "The Berlin Wisdom Paradigm [...] combines a broad definition of wisdom as excellence in mind and virtue with a specific characterization of wisdom as an expert knowledge system dealing with the conduct and understanding of life."
- Jeste et al. (2010) found that an expert consensus panel mostly agreed that wisdom is "uniquely human; a form of advanced cognitive and emotional development that is experience driven; and a personal quality, albeit a rare one, which can be learned, increases with age, can be measured, and is not likely to be enhanced by taking medication."
- Zhang, Shi and Wang (2023) distinguish two different understandings of wisdom: "(a) As action or behav-iour, wisdom refers to well-motivated actors achieving an altruistic outcome by creatively and successfully solving problems. (b) As a psychological trait, wisdom refers to a global psychological quality that engages intellectual ability, prior knowl-edge and experience in a way that integrates virtue and wit, and is acquired through life experience and continued practice."

Zhang et al. (2023) note that all definitions include two common components, namely an emphasis on cognition, meaning, and affect, and a concern for human welfare, which means that "most definitions point to wisdom as essential to creating a better world."

=== Heuristic approaches ===
Sternberg (1990) distinguishes three distinctive approaches to understanding wisdom: philosophical, folk conceptions, and psychodevelopmental views.

Sternberg (2003) distinguishes philosophical approaches, implicit-theoretical approaches (folk-conceptions), and explicit-theoretical approaches. For the philosophical approaches Sternberg refers to Robinson (1990), who points to Plato's three different senses of wisdom, namely sophia, phronesis, and episteme. Implicit-theoretical approaches explicate folk conceptions of wisdom, as first set out by Clayton (1975). Explicit-thepretical approaches "have in common a formal theory of wisdom that is proposed to account for wisdom." A distinct group of theories focus on structural stage theory and post-formal thinking as a stage beyond Piaget's formal operations.

According to Baltes and Staudinger (2000), theoretical and empirical studies on wisdom have, broadly seen, taken three approaches to understanding wisdom: as a personal characteristic or a "constellation of personality dispositions", such as Erik Eriksons theory of stages of psychosocial development; as a post-formal way of thinking in structural stage theory: or as an expert way of dealing with "the meaning of and conduct of life." (Note: Baltes & Staudinger (2000): Theoretical and empirical work on explicit psychological theories of wisdom can be roughly divided into three groups: (a) the conceptualization of wisdom as a personal characteristic or constellation of personality dispositions (e.g., Erikson, 1959; McAdams & de St. Aubin, 1998), (b) the conceptualization of wisdom in the neo-Piagetian tradition of postformal and dialectical thought (e.g., Alex ander & Langer, 1990; Labouvie-Vief, 1990), and (c) the conceptualization of wisdom as an expert system dealing with the meaning and conduct of life (P. Baltes & Smith, 1990; Dittmann-Kohli & Baltes, 1990; Staudinger & Baltes, 1994).")

=== Trait, context, behaviour ===
According Sternberg, definitions can be grouped as "into four types: (a) a personal psychological excellence [trait], (b) a property of the situation, (c) an interaction between person and situation, and (d) a property of action."

Trait-theories include Erikson's lifespan theory, neo-Piagetian post-formal stages, and Baltes' Berlin Wisdom paradigm.

According to Grossman (2017), wisdom can be viewed as a stable personality trait, or as a context-bound process, meaning that a person in some contexts behaves wisely, but in other contexts does not. Zhang et al. (2023) point to Martin Luther King, Mohandas Gandhi and Albert Einstein, who "show great wisdom in their careers, but not in their personal live."

Zhang et al. (2023) further note that an interactional approach is a sociocultural approach, which takes into account "the sociocultural context within which wisdom occurs." Sternberg's theory takes this approach.

As a "property of action," research "should not focus on individuals but on the actions of individuals or groups," according to Sternberg. To this, Zhang et al. (2023) object that wisdom as a concept involves more than just observing and classifying begaviour, but also distinguishing psychological attributes.

=== Theories and models ===
Developmental theories hark back to the older theories of Erik Erikson, who posited stages of psychosocial development, and post-formal stages of structural stage theories, such as Jane Loevinger's stages of ego development and James W. Fowler's stages of faith.

Zhang, Shi, and Wang (2023) list the following explicit-formal theories of wisdom: (Note: Zhang, Shi & Wang (2023): "Since wisdom research in psychology began in the late 1970s (Clayton, 1975), many scientific theories about wisdom have emerged, including: (a) the Berlin wisdom paradigm (Baltes & Kunzmann, 2004; Baltes & Smith, 2008; Baltes & Staudinger, 1993, 2000; Scheibe et al., 2007), (b) the balance theory of wisdom (Sternberg, 1998, 2018), (c) the self-transcendence wisdom theory (Levenson et al., 2005), (d) the three-dimensional wisdom theory (Ardelt, 2003; Thomas et al., 2015), (e) the H.E.R.O.(E.) model of wisdom (Webster, 2003; Webster et al., 2014, 2017), (f) the process view of wisdom (Yang, 2008, 2013, 2016, 2017), and (g) the integrating virtue and wit theory of wisdom (Chen & Wang, 2013; Wang et al., 2019, pp. 376–378; Wang & Zheng, 2012, 2014, 2015).")

- The Berlin Wisdom Paradigm, an expertise model of life wisdom developed by Paul B. Baltes.
- The Balance Theory of Wisdom developed by Robert J. Sternberg
- The Self-transcendence Wisdom Theory
- The Three-dimensional Wisdom Theory
- The H.E.R.O.(E.) Model of Wisdom
- The Process View of Wisdom
- The Integrating Virtue and Wit Theory of Wisdom

==== Berlin Wisdom Paradigm - Paul B.Baltes ====
The research of Baltes and his colleagues is related to his research on intellectual abilities and aging. Their research focuses on decision-making in fundamental life-matters, discerning general personal factors, expertise specific factors, and "facilitative experiential contexts" as facilitating wise judgments. According to Baltes' research, wisdom has five components: rich factual knowledge of life-matters, rich procedural knowledge, life span contextualism, relativism, apprehending uncertainty. According to Baltes,

The Berlin Wisdom Paradigm [...] combines a broad definition of wisdom as excellence in mind and virtue with a specific characterization of wisdom as an expert knowledge system dealing with the conduct and understanding of life. We called this domain of knowledge the fundamental pragmatics of life [...] life planning [...] life management [...] and life review[.]

==== Balance Theory of Wisdom - Robert J. Sternberg ====
Sternberg's research has focused on intelligence, creativity, and wisdom, and the question what constitutes successful intelligence, arguing that creative and practical abilities are also essential contributors to life success. Sternberg amended his research on intelligence with the question how success can proceed beyond mere material success and personal benefit. In Sternbergs view', wisdom is "the value-laden application of tacit knowledge not only for one's own benefit (as can be the case with successful intelligence), but also for the benefit of others, in order to attain a common good. The wise person realizes that what matters is not just knowledge, or the intellectual skills one applies to this knowledge, but how the knolwedge is used."

=== Aspects ===
==== Meta-cognition ====
There is some consensus that critical to wisdom are certain meta-cognitive processes that afford life reflection and judgment about critical life matters. Accordin to Vuong (2022), these processes include recognizing the limits of one's own knowledge, acknowledging uncertainty and change, attention to context and the bigger picture, and integrating different perspectives of a situation.

Grossmann and colleagues summarized prior psychological literature to conclude that wisdom involves certain cognitive processes that afford unbiased, sound judgment in the face of ill-defined life situations:

1. intellectual humility, or recognition of limits of own knowledge
2. appreciation of perspectives broader than the issue at hand
3. sensitivity to the possibility of change in social relations
4. compromise or integration of different perspectives

==== Interpersonal sensitivity ====
According to Brienza et al. (2017), wisdom-related reasoning is associated with achieving balance between intrapersonal and interpersonal interests when facing personal life challenges, and when setting goals for managing interpersonal conflicts.

Grossmann and Kross identified a phenomenon they called "the Solomon's paradox": that wise people reflect more wisely on other people's problems than on their own. (It is named after King Solomon, who had legendary sagacity when making judgments about other people's dilemmas but lacked insight when it came to important decisions in his own life.)

==== Personal distancing ====
Grossmann and colleagues also found that different ways to instantiate psychological self-distancing, becoming a "fly on the wall", either via visual, spatial, or linguistic distance (habitually speaking and thinking of oneself in the third person) promotes wiser thinking about interpersonal challenges.

==== Contextual factors ====
Grossmann says contextual factors – such as culture, experiences, and social situations – influence the understanding, development, and propensity of wisdom, with implications for training and educational practice. A focus on the situation allows wisdom researchers to develop a fuller understanding of the role of context in producing wisdom.

Studies have shown evidence of cross-cultural and within-cultural variability, and systematic variability in reasoning wisely across contexts and in daily life.

Grossmann and colleagues (2018) also documented a positive relationship between diversity of emotional experience and wise reasoning, irrespective of emotional intensity.

=== Relation with intelligence ===
Robert J. Sternberg, studying the relation between wisdom, intelligence, and creativity, argues that wisdom is both theoretically and empirically distinct from general (fluid or crystallized) intelligence, and that success requires more than mere intelligence. Sternberg (1990) found six components related to folk-conceptions of wisdom: reasoning ability, sagacity, learning from ideas and environment, judgment, expeditious use of information, perspicacity. For intelligence, the components were practical problem-solving ability, verbal ability, intellectual balance and integration, goal orientation and attainment, contextual intelligence, fluid thought. Sternberg further found that "wisdom and intelligence are highly correlated in people's implicit theories, at least in the United States.

Staudinger, Lopez and Baltes (1997) "found that measures of intelligence (as well as personality) overlap with, but are nonidentical to, measures of wisdom in terms of constructs measured." Grossmann et al. (2010) have shown empirically that wise reasoning is distinct from IQ.

According to Brown and Greene (2006) "there is an overlap of the implicit theory of wisdom with intelligence, perceptiveness, spirituality, and shrewdness."

Jeste et al. (2010) defined wisdom using an expert consensus panel to determine how wisdom was viewed as being different from intelligence and spirituality, and found that the panel viewed wisdom as being different from intelligence on 49 of the 53 items used in their Likert scale statements.

=== Relation with age ===
Many, but not all, studies find that adults' self-ratings of perspective and wisdom do not depend on age. This conflicts with the popular notion that wisdom increases with age. The answer to whether age and wisdom correlate depends on how one defines wisdom and one's experimental technique. The answer to this question also depends on the domain studied, and the role of experience in that domain, with some contexts favoring older adults, others favoring younger adults, and some not differentiating age groups. Rigorous longitudinal work is needed to answer this question, while most studies rely on cross-sectional observations.

=== Measuring wisdom ===
Empirical (evidence-based) research on wisdom is relatively new, but growing rapidly.

Wisdom as a personality trait can be measured with self-questionnaires, which are prone to self-report bias.

Contextual approaches measure multiple dimensions including features of cognition, motivation, and emotion, in the context of a specific situation. Such state-level measures provide less-biased responses as well as greater power in explaining meaningful psychological processes.

The Jeste-Thomas Wisdom Index is based on a survey (SD-WISE-28) created by researchers at the University of California San Diego to determine how wise a person is. In 2021 Dilip V. Jeste and his colleagues created a survey (SD-WISE-7) testing seven components: acceptance of diverse perspectives, decisiveness, emotional regulation, prosocial behaviors, self-reflection, social advising, and (to a lesser degree) spirituality. However, the usefulness of such ultra-short, abstract, and decontextualized approaches are increasingly put into question from a methodological and ontological perspective, as summarized in the latest Annual Review of Psychology on wisdom. As the "humility paradox" discussed by Grossmann and Weststrate demonstrates, a person claiming to be incredibly humble may either deceive themselves and others, or this person may be miscalibrated in their self-views due to the lack of humility.

== Psychotherapy ==
=== Jungian psychology ===
The wise old person is an unconscious attitude concerning nature and the collective unconscious.

Star Wars is a monomyth that uses archetypal psychology, specifically Joseph Campbell's The Hero of a Thousand Faces. The character Master Yoda from the films evokes the trope of the wise old man, and he is frequently quoted, analogously to Chinese thinkers or Eastern sages in general.

=== Gestalt therapy ===
A wise-person fantasy is an awareness intervention, where one poses a question, thinks on it for a few minutes, and then role-plays a fantasized wise person to answer that same question.

== Educational perspectives ==
Public schools in the U.S. sometimes nod at "character education" which would include training in wisdom.

=== Maxwell's educational philosophy ===
Nicholas Maxwell, a philosopher in the United Kingdom, believes academia ought to alter its focus from the acquisition of knowledge to seeking and promoting wisdom. This he defines as the capacity to realize what is of value in life, for oneself and others. He teaches that new knowledge and technological know-how increase our power to act. Without wisdom though, Maxwell claims this new knowledge may cause human harm as well as human good. He argues that the pursuit of knowledge is indeed valuable and good, but that it should be considered a part of the broader task of improving wisdom.

== See also ==
- Anima mundi – Concept in metaphysics
- Bildung – German tradition of self-cultivation
- Book of Wisdom – Jewish work written in Greek generally dated to the mid-first century BC
- Cassandra (metaphor) – Metaphor originating from Greek mythology
- Conventional wisdom – Generally accepted ideas
- DIKW pyramid – Data, information, knowledge, wisdom hierarchy
- Ecological wisdom – Philosophy current
- Eudaimonia – Human flourishing in ancient Greek philosophy
- Genius – Exceptional intellectual ability, creativity, or originality
- Heuristic – Problem-solving method
- Invocation – Supplication to a supernatural being
- Metacognition – Self-awareness about thinking, higher-order thinking skills
- Perspicacity – Great discernment or insight
- Procedural knowledge – Knowledge of how to perform a task
- Reflexivity (social theory) – Circular relationships between cause and effect
- Sage (philosophy) – Someone who has attained wisdom
- Sapere aude – Latin phrase meaning "dare to know"
- Socratic method – Type of cooperative argumentative dialogue
- Transcendence (philosophy) – Concept designating the extra-categorical attributes of beings
- Wisdom of the crowd – Collective perception of a group of people

== Sources ==
- Arbel, Keren (2016), Early Buddhist Meditation: The Four Jhanas as the Actualization of Insight, Routledge, doi:10.4324/9781315676043, ISBN 978-1-317-38399-4
- Baltes, Paul B.; Staudinger, Ursula M. (2000). "Wisdom: A Metaheuristic (Pragmatic) to Orchestrate Mind and Virtue Toward Excellence". American Psychologist. 55 (1): 122–136. doi:10.1037/0003-066X.55.1.122. PMID 11392856.
- Baltes, P.B.; Glück, J.; Kunzmann, U. (2001). "Wisdom: Its structure and function in regulating successful life span development". In Snyder, C.R.; Lopez, S.J. (eds.). Handbook of Positive Psychology. Oxford University Press. pp. 327–347.
- Baltes, Paul B.; Smith, Jacqui (2008). "The Fascination of Wisdom: Its Nature, Ontogeny, and Function". Perspectives on Psychological Science. 3 (1): 56–64. doi:10.1111/j.1745-6916.2008.00062.x. JSTOR 40212228. PMID 26158670.
- Bodhi, Bhikkhu. "The Noble Eightfold Path". Access to Insight.
- Bluck, Susan; Glück, Judith (2005). "From the Inside Out: People's Implicit Theories of Wisdom". In Sternberg, Robert; Jordan, Jennifer (eds.). A handbook of wisdom: Psychological perspectives. New York: Cambridge University Press. pp. 84–109. doi:10.1017/cbo9780511610486.005. ISBN 978-0-511-61048-6.
- Brown, S. C.; Greene, J. A. (2006). "The Wisdom Development Scale: Translating the conceptual to the concrete" (PDF). Journal of College Student Development. 47: 1–19. doi:10.1353/csd.2006.0002. S2CID 35496789. Archived from the original (PDF) on 5 July 2017.
- Grossmann, I.; Na, J.; Varnum, M.E.; Park, D.C.; Kitayama, S.; Nisbett, R.E. (2010). "Reasoning about social conflicts improves into old age" (PDF). Proceedings of the National Academy of Sciences. 107 (16): 7246–7250. Bibcode:2010PNAS..107.7246G. doi:10.1073/pnas.1001715107. PMC 2867718. PMID 20368436.
- Grossmann, I. (2017d). "Wisdom in context". Perspectives on Psychological Science. 12 (2): 233–257. doi:10.1177/1745691616672066. PMID 28346113. S2CID 26818408.
- Jeste, D.V.; Ardelt, M.; Blazer, D.; Kraemer, H.C.; Vaillant, G.; Meeks, T.W. (October 2010). "Expert consensus on characteristics of wisdom: a Delphi method study". Gerontologist. 50 (5): 668–680. doi:10.1093/geront/gnq022. PMC 2937249. PMID 20233730.
- Karunamuni, N.; Weerasekera, R. (2019). "Theoretical Foundations to Guide Mindfulness Meditation: A Path to Wisdom". Current Psychology. 38 (3): 627–646. doi:10.1007/s12144-017-9631-7. S2CID 149024504.
- Labouvie-Vief, G. (1990). "Wisdom as integrated thought: historical and ddvelopmental perspectives". In Sternberg, Robert J. (ed.). Wisdom. It's nature, origins, and development. Cambridge University Press.
- Nyanatiloka (1980), Buddhist Dictionary. Manual of Buddhist terms and Doctrines. Fourth Revised edition, Buddhist Publication Society
- Robinson, Daniel N. (1990). "2. Wisdom through the ages". In Sternberg, Robert J. (ed.). Wisdom. It's nature, origins, and development. Cambridge University Press.
- Staudinger, U.M.; Lopez, D.F; Baltes, P.B. (1997). "The psychometric location of wisdom-related performance: Intelligence, personality, and more?". Personality and Social Psychology Bulletin. 23 (11): 1200–1214. doi:10.1177/01461672972311007. S2CID 145148320.
- Staudinger, U.M.; Glück, J. (2011). "Psychological wisdom research: Commonalities and differences in a growing field". Annual Review of Psychology. 62: 215–241. doi:10.1146/annurev.psych.121208.131659. PMID 20822439.
- Sternberg, R. J. (1985). "Implicit theories of intelligence, creativity, and wisdom". Journal of Personality and Social Psychology. 49 (3): 607–662. doi:10.1037/0022-3514.49.3.607.
- Sternberg, Robert J. (1990). "1. Understanding wisdom". In Sternberg, Robert J. (ed.). Wisdom. It's nature, origins, and development. Cambridge University Press.
- Sternberg, Robert J. (2003). Wisdom, Intelligence, and Creativity Synthesized. New York: Cambridge University Press. ISBN 978-0-521-80238-3.
- Sternberg, Robert J. (2007) [2003]. Wisdom, Intelligence and Creativity Synthesized. Cambridge University Press.
- Sternberg, R. J. (2019a). "Four ways to conceive of wisdom: Wisdom as a function of person, situation, person/situation interaction, or action". The Journal of Value Inquiry. 53 (3): 479–485. doi:10.1007/s10790-019-09708-2.
- Thanissaro Bhikkhu (1997), One Tool Among Many. The Place of Vipassana in Buddhist Practice, archived from the original on 12 April 2010
- Zhang, K.; Shi, J.; Wang, F. (2023). "Wisdom: Meaning, structure, types, arguments, and future concerns". Current Psychology. 42 (18): 15030–15051. doi:10.1007/s12144-022-02816-6. PMC 8817649. PMID 35153458.
