= UC San Diego School of Medicine =

Medical school of UC San Diego

University of California, San Diego School of Medicine
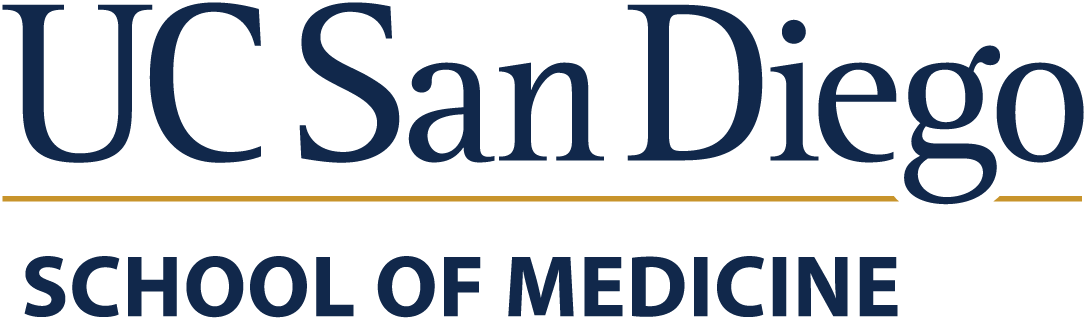
- Motto: Fiat lux Let there be light
- Type: Public medical school
- Established: 1968; 58 years ago
- Parent institution: University of California, San Diego
- Dean: Barbara Jung
- Faculty: 1,425 full- and part-time
- Students: 573 M.D. students 90 M.D./Ph.D. students 59 Master's students
- Location: La Jolla, California, United States; 32.876°N 117.237°W
- Campus: Urban
- Nickname: Tritons
- Mascot: King Triton
- Website: medschool.ucsd.edu

The University of California, San Diego School of Medicine is the medical school of the University of California, San Diego. It was the fourth medical school in the University of California system, after those established at UCSF, UCLA, and UCI and is the only medical school in the San Diego metropolitan area. It is closely affiliated with the medical centers that are part of UC San Diego Health.

== History ==
In 1960, a committee commissioned by the governor to study the provision of healthcare services in California found that the state should be graduating about 1,300 new doctors per year but at the time was graduating less than 700. The committee recommended the creation of additional state-supported medical schools in order to maintain a healthy ratio of about 175 physicians to every 100,000 people.

In 1962, the fledgling university began searching for a dean to head its planned medical school, which would be the first such institution in San Diego County. The concept was based on the successful models of public medical education and practice in San Francisco and Los Angeles. The man eventually chosen was Joseph Stokes III, an expert in the fields of preventive medicine and cardiovascular epidemiology. Stokes played a key role in aggressively recruiting leading physician scientists of its era and rapidly building the institute's reputation as an elite medical school. Faculty members recruited to the university by Stokes included Y.C. Fung, who would later be considered the father of bioengineering. His efforts were aided by the campus's existing strengths in the biological sciences and close proximity to the famed Salk Institute.

The basic science building was the first building constructed on the School of Medicine grounds, which were east of Revelle College and north of New Miramar Road (later renamed La Jolla Village Drive). The first cohort of medical students, 39 men and 8 women, enrolled in 1968, while construction on the clinical science building and adjacent 100-bed Veterans Administration Hospital were still ongoing. The inaugural class in 1971 achieved the highest score in the country on the National Board of Medical Examiners Step 1 Examination, propelling the new school into the national spotlight. The school's first degrees were conferred upon them in 1972. Clinical rotations took place at the UC San Diego Medical Center, then known as Hillcrest County Hospital, which had been constructed by the county in 1963 and leased to the university in 1966.

Research and innovation efforts were successful early in the school's history. By 1969, UCSD was a leader in the novel technique of pulmonary thromboendarterectomy. In 1972, faculty members experimented with the use of early echocardiograms.

In 1973, Helen Ranney joined the faculty, and would become the first American woman to be chair of the department of medicine at a medical school.

In 1982, UCSD opened one of the first clinics for the treatment of HIV and AIDS.

In 2005, the UCSD Moores Cancer Center opened.

In 2021, UCSD received $2.6M to expand Programs in Medical Education (PRIME) focused on health equity and Indigenous health.

== Campus ==
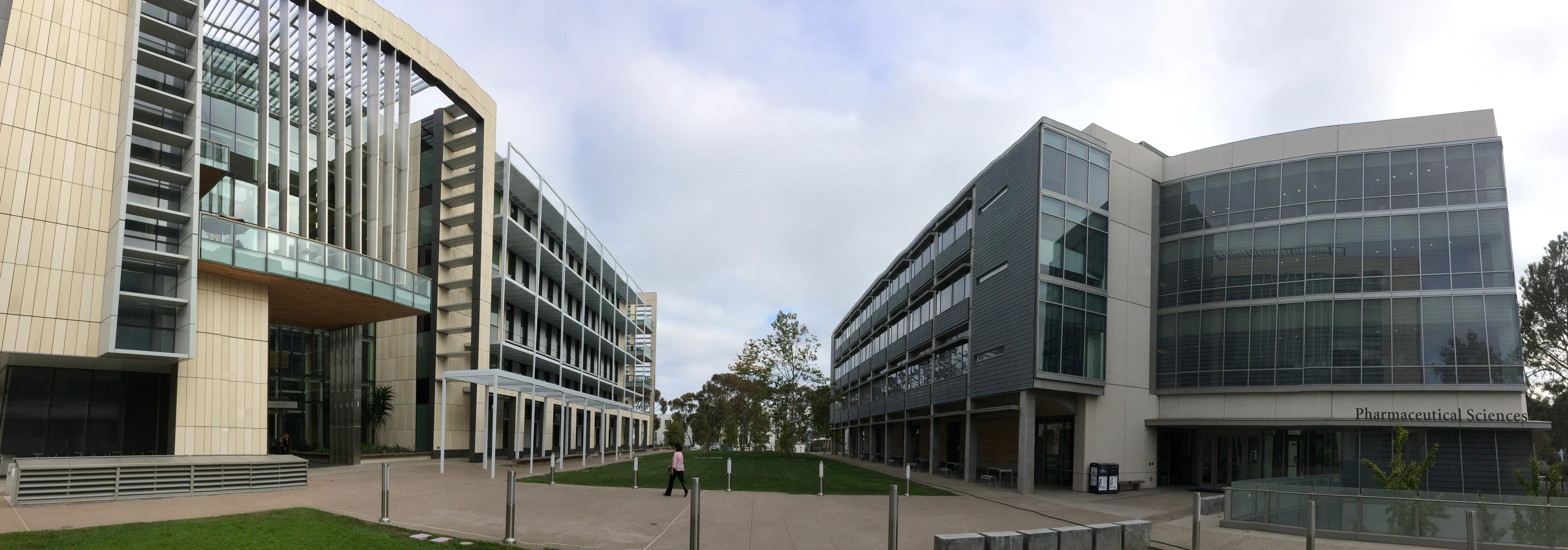
The School of Medicine Academic Mall

The School of Medicine neighborhood occupies 54 acres on the southern portion of the main campus. It is bordered by Gilman Drive and Revelle College to the west, Gilman Drive and University Center to the north, Villa La Jolla Drive and the San Diego VA Medical Center to the east, and La Jolla Village Drive to the south. The main entrances to the campus are via Library Walk for pedestrians and Osler Lane for vehicles. The neighborhood's buildings are arranged around a series of three green spaces: the School of Medicine Quad, the Ceremonial Green, and the Academic Mall. The School of Medicine quad is an informal, grassy area which channels pedestrians from Revelle College and Library Walk toward Sally T. WongAvery Library and the adjacent academic and research facilities. The Ceremonial Green is a quadrantal lawn which is used for graduation ceremonies and other outdoor functions in front of the Medical Education and Telemedicine Building. The Academic Mall is a structured, flat quadrangle with gathering spaces and academic and research facilities along its east and west edges, and the Rita Atkinson Residences (medical student housing) at its southern terminus.

Most of the campus buildings serve an academic, research, or administrative purpose. Exceptions are the Rita Atkinson Residences, which houses 450 graduate students in a nine-story, two-tower structure, and the Club Med dining facility at the base of the telemedicine building. The campus features two Stuart Collection works. Terrace, by Jackie Ferrara, consists of three tiled terraces which flow into one another to connect both wings of the Cellular and Molecular Medicine facility. It is the ninth work in the collection. The fourteenth work, Standing by Kiki Smith, is a nude bronze woman raised on a concrete eucalyptus trunk trickling water from her hands to its roots. It was the artist's first permanent outdoor sculpture.

=== Student life ===
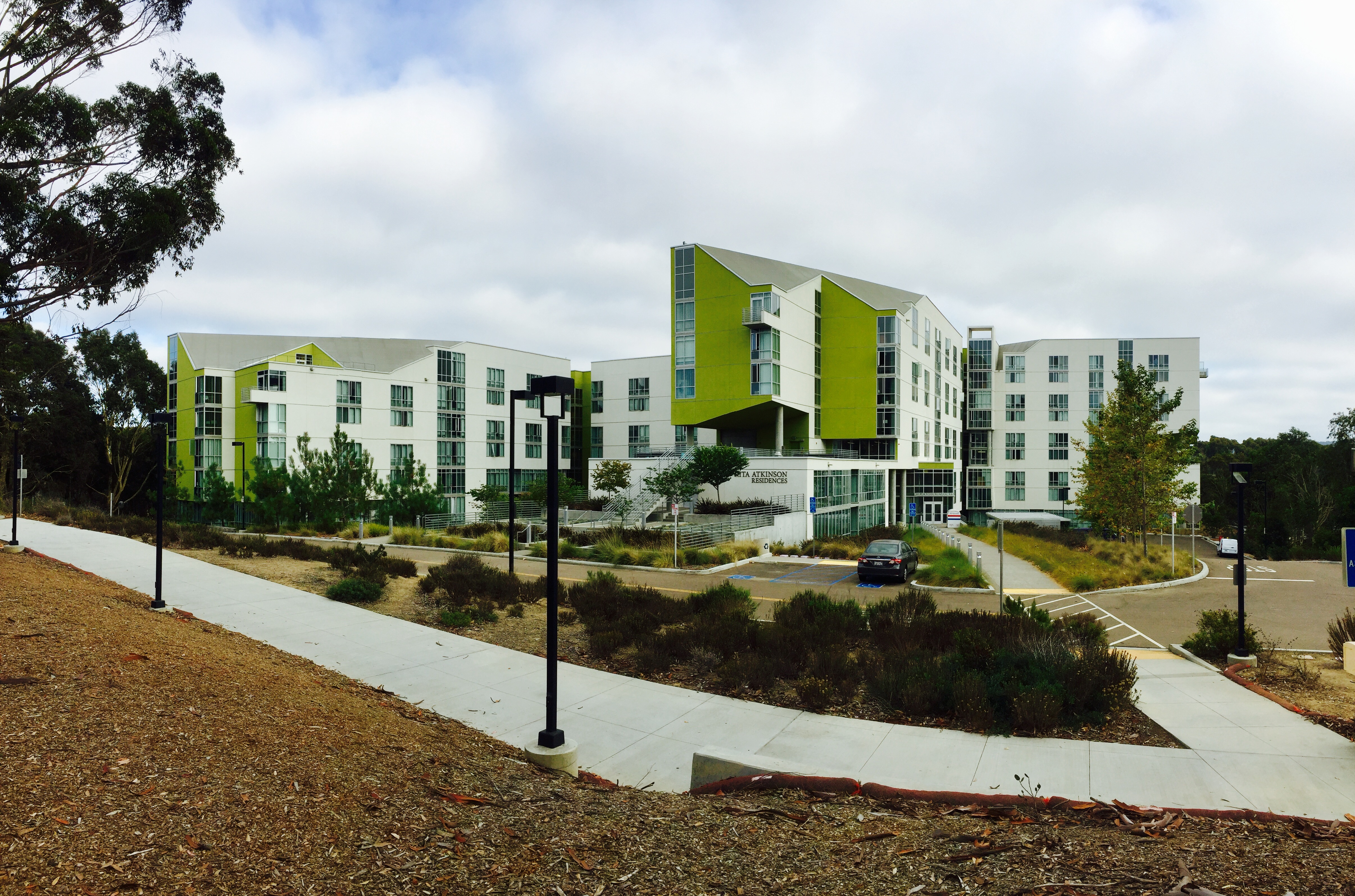
The Rita Atkinson Residences house medical students and residents

The School of Medicine offers several programs and services for medical students, including the Healthy Student Program, the Office of Educational Support Services, the Careers in Medicine Program, Faculty Mentors, the Office of Student Affairs advisors, the Big Sib program, Senior Mentors, and Senior Faculty Advisors. In addition, medical students run nearly 40 active organizations.

== Admissions and rankings ==
Admission to the UC San Diego School of Medicine M.D. program is among the most selective in the country. For the class entering Fall 2015, 253 of the 7,456 applicants were admitted. This 3.4% acceptance rate is the tenth-lowest of 170 schools surveyed by U.S. News & World Report nationally. Of admits who choose to matriculate, the average undergraduate GPA is 3.73 and the average MCAT composite score is 34.2 out of 45. The most popular residency and specialty programs are internal medicine, anesthesiology, dermatology, obstetrics & gynecology, orthopaedic surgery, otolaryngology, pediatrics, psychiatry, radiology (diagnostic) and surgery.

The UC San Diego School of Medicine is ranked 18th in the 2017 edition of U.S. News & World Report for research and ranked 12th in primary care. The "Drug and Alcohol Abuse" research program is ranked 10th overall. The Academic Ranking of World Universities ranks UC San Diego 20th in the world for clinical medicine and pharmacy.

== Curriculum ==
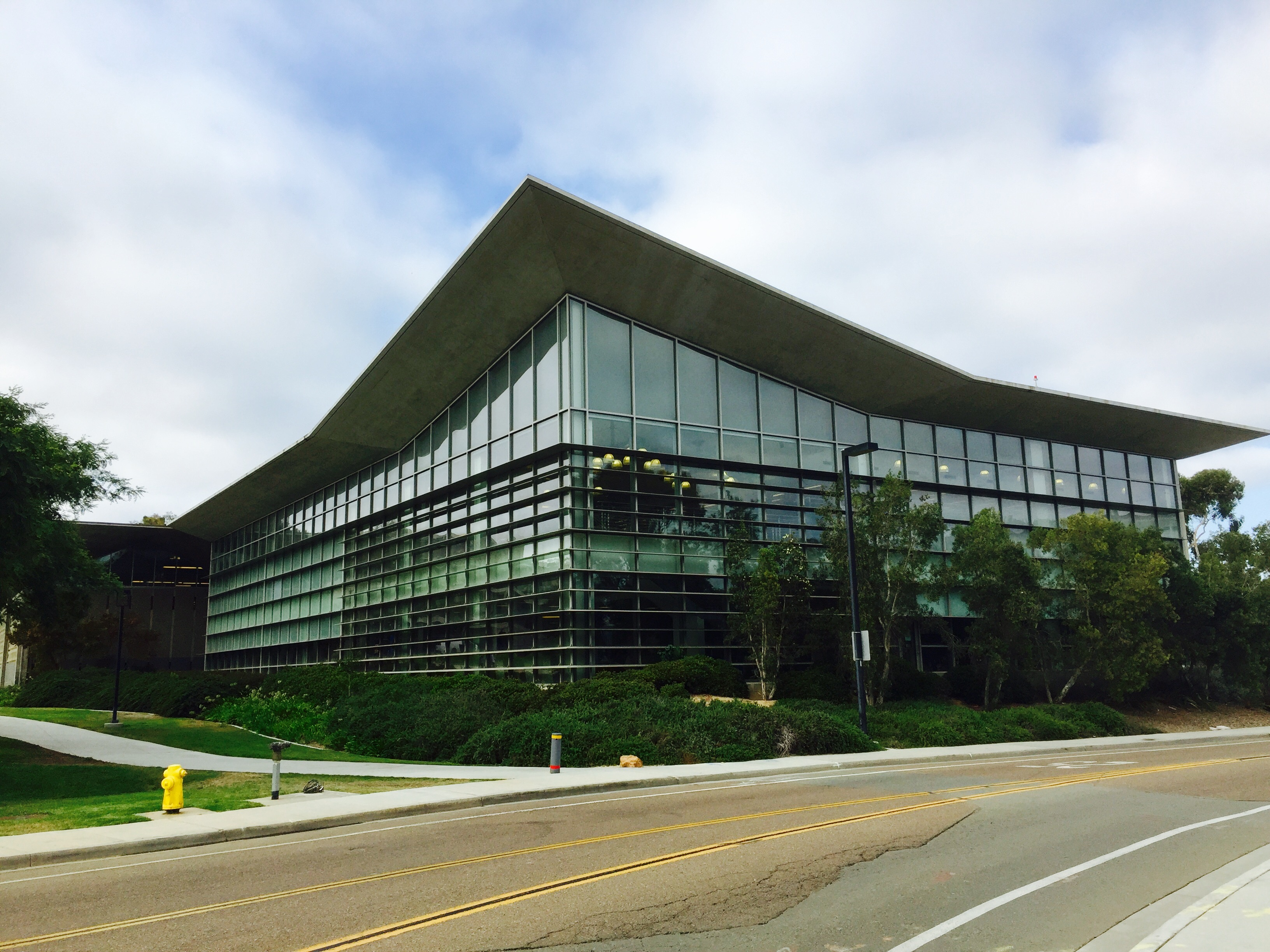
The south expansion of WongAvery Library

In 2010, the school altered its curriculum, and designated the plan "Integrated Scientific Curriculum", to emphasize ambulatory experience and better prepare students for medical practice. The first two years consist of classroom learning based on topical units, followed by two years of clinical rotations.

The Independent Study Project (ISP) has long been a cornerstone of the elective curriculum at the UCSD School of Medicine. Students are required to complete a project under the direction of an ISP committee usually consisting of three or more School of Medicine faculty.

== Research ==
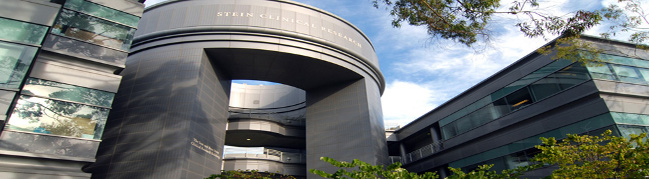
The Stein Clinical Research building houses the Stein Institute for Research on Aging

The school operates and contributes to several organized clinical research units, including the Moores Cancer Center, the Altman Clinical and Translational Research Institute, the Stein Institute for Research on Aging, the AntiViral Research Center, the Center of AIDS Research, the Pediatric Pharmacology Research Unit, the Center for Academic Research and Training in Anthropogeny, and the Shiley-Marcos Alzheimer's Disease Research Center.

=== Notable people ===
==== Notable alumni ====
- Margaret Allen (M.D. 1974) became the first female heart transplant surgeon.
- Brian Druker (M.D. 1981) discovered the drug imatinib (Gleevec) for the treatment of chronic myelogenous leukemia.
- Khaled Hosseini (M.D. 1993) is an American novelist and physician.
- Geoff Abrams (M.D. 2006) is an American professional tennis player.
- Ryan Abbott (M.D. 2005) is British-American academic and physician
- Michael R. Irwin is an American psychiatrist and academic

==== Notable faculty ====
The school's faculty have included eight Nobel Laureates in Physiology or Medicine:

- Francis Crick (1962) – J.W. Kieckhefer Distinguished Research Professor, Salk Institute for Biological Studies
- Robert W. Holley (1968) – Professor, Salk Institute for Biological Studies
- George Palade (1974) – Dean of the School of Medicine
- Renato Dulbecco (1975) – Professor Emeritus, Department of Pathology
- Roger Guillemin (1977) – Professor, Salk Institute for Biological Studies
- Sydney Brenner (2002) – Adjunct Professor, Department of Biological Sciences
- Roger Tsien (2008) – Professor, Department of Pharmacology
- Bruce Beutler (2011) – Professor, Scripps Research Institute

Other notable faculty include:

- Randy Davison – Actor who trains diagnostics with medical students.
- William Nyhan – Pediatrician who first described what is now called the Lesch–Nyhan syndrome
- Kenneth Kaushansky – Former chairman and Helen Ranney Professor of the Department of Medicine; current dean of the Stony Brook University School of Medicine
- John B. West – Current Pulmonary Faculty; led the American Medical Research Expedition to Everest in 1981; Former NASA chairman of the Science Verification Committee in 1983; American Physiological Society (APS) president in 1984; author of Respiratory Physiology: The Essentials

== Community affiliations ==
Primary teaching hospitals affiliated with this medical school where clinical teaching or training is carried out: Rady Children's Hospital, San Diego Naval Regional Medical Center, San Diego VA Medical Center, Scripps Green Hospital, Scripps Mercy Hospital, and UC San Diego Health.

Clinical teaching and training at the UCSD School of Medicine are carried out at seven primary teaching hospitals: Rady Children's Hospital, the San Diego Naval Regional Medical Center, the San Diego VA Medical Center, Scripps Green Hospital, Scripps Mercy Hospital, and UC San Diego Health. The school's affiliation with UC San Diego Health includes all its entities: UC San Diego Medical Center, Jacobs Medical Center, Moores Cancer Center, Sulpizio Cardiovascular Center, Shiley Eye Institute, and various outpatient clinics.

School of Medicine researchers also work alongside scientists from several other medical research entities. These affiliations include the Perdana University Graduate School of Medicine, La Jolla Institute for Immunology, Rady Children's Hospital, the Salk Institute for Biological Studies, San Diego Supercomputer Center, Sanford Burnham Prebys, Scripps Institution of Oceanography, Scripps Research, St. Vincent de Paul Village Family Health Center, UC San Diego Health, Indian Health Service, and the VA San Diego Healthcare System.

=== Student-Run Free Clinic ===
The UCSD Student-Run Free Clinic Project, in partnership with the community, provides accessible, quality health care for the underserved in respectful environments in which students, health professionals, patients and community members learn from each other. It seeks to sustain health through free medical and preventive care, health education and access to social service. It has locations in downtown San Diego, Pacific Beach, National City, and Lemon Grove.
