= Helen Ranney =

American physician

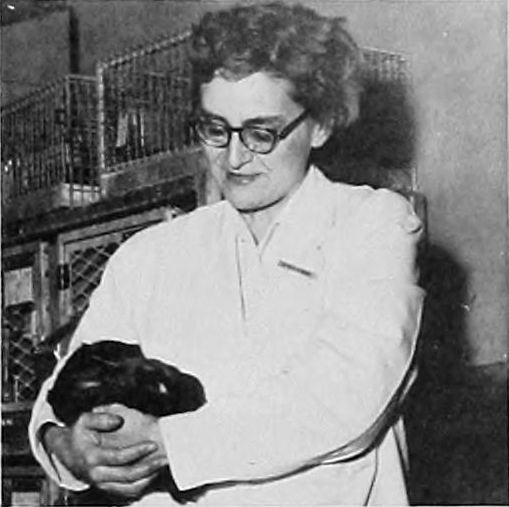
Helen M. Ranney, c. 1960

Helen Margaret Ranney (April 12, 1920 – April 5, 2010) was an American doctor and hematologist who made significant contributions to research on sickle-cell anemia.

== Early life ==
Ranney was born in Summer Hill, New York, where her parents ran a dairy farm. Her mother was a teacher, and both her parents encouraged her in her studies and pursuing a professional career. She attended a one-room school as a child and later graduated cum laude from Barnard College in 1941.Initially, she planned to study law; however, it was during her time at Barnard College that she decided to study medicine, saying "Medicine attempts to fix what it studies." She initially faced barriers to continuing her medical education at Columbia university based on her gender. However, policy changes during World War II allowed for her admission to the College of Physicians and Surgeons at Columbia University.

== Career ==
Ranney was a professor at Harvard Medical School and a staff physician at Brigham and Women's Hospital. She was the first woman to serve as president of the Association of American Physicians and the American Society of Hematology. Additionally, she was also one of the first women to be admitted to the American Society for Clinical Investigation and was the first woman honored as a Distinguished Physician of the Veterans Administration. Her research on hemoglobin started in 1953. She was the first to use paper electrophoresis for separating human hemoglobin. This groundbreaking work significantly contributed to the understanding of the inheritance of sickle-cell disease. In 1960, she co-founded the heredity clinic at Albert Einstein College of Medicine.

Ranney was a faculty member and the first female head of the Department of Medicine at the University of California, San Diego School of Medicine. In 1973, she was elected a member of the National Academy of Sciences and the Institute of Medicine. She was elected a Fellow of the American Academy of Arts and Sciences in 1975.

== Awards, honors, and memberships ==
- Dr. Ranney was awarded the Dr. Martin Luther King, Jr., Medical Achievement Award in 1972 for her work with blood disorders, which included the first description of the abnormal blood cell structure and genetic factors linked to sickle cell anemia.
- President of the Association of American Physicians (the first woman to hold this office).
- Distinguished Physician of the Veterans Administration (the first woman so honored).
- President of the American Society of Hematology.
- Master of the American College of Physicians.
- Elected in 1973 to the Institute of Medicine (now called the National Academies of Sciences, Engineering, & Medicine)
