= William Fishman =

William Fishman may refer to:

- William J. Fishman (1921–2014), British historian and academic
- William H. Fishman (1914–2001), Canadian-American cancer researcher
- Bill Fishman (director), American film director
