= Beverly M. Emerson =

American professor and scientist

Beverly Marie Emerson
- Born: January 18, 1952 (age 74); Eugene, Oregon
- Education: University of St Andrews; University of California, San Diego; Washington University in St. Louis
- Known for: Molecular Biology, p53
- Scientific career
- Workplaces: Salk Institute for Biological Studies; Oregon Health & Science University
- Doctoral advisor: Robert G. Roeder

Beverly M. Emerson (born January 18, 1952) is an emeritus Professor of Biological Sciences at the Salk Institute for Biological Studies who uncovered details about how cancer becomes drug resistant. She is currently a Distinguished Professor at the Oregon Health & Science University’s Knight Cancer Institute. She is a Fellow of the American Association for the Advancement of Science and the American Academy of Arts and Sciences.

== Early life and education ==
Emerson was born in Eugene, Oregon. Her parents divorced when she was young and her mother became a traveller. Her father was an amateur boxer and her mother was a gambler. Emerson attended the La Châtelainie School for Girls in Neuchâtel for a year. She studied biology at the University of California, San Diego. To support her studies, she worked as a carhop at Shoney's and a waitress at a steakhouse. During her undergraduate studies she spent a year at the University of St Andrews (1972), where she worked with Donald Helinski and E. Peter Geiduschek. She joined Washington University in St. Louis for her graduate studies, earning a PhD in molecular biology in 1981 under the supervision of Robert G. Roeder. She faced some challenges during her doctoral studies, but was helped by Shirley M. Tilghman who visited Seattle as a guest speaker. Emerson was a postdoctoral research associate at the National Institutes of Health, where she started to work on transcription. She has continued to investigate how transcription can malfunction and cause disease throughout her academic career.

== Research and career ==
Emerson joined the Salk Institute for Biological Studies in 1986. She joined at the same time as Katherine Jones. She was awarded a Pew Scholars Award, and held an adjunct position at the University of California, San Diego. Emerson was promoted to professor in 1999.

Emerson's lab considered how genes are turned on and off throughout the course of cancer. The study of how tumour suppressant genes are silenced during cancer has been the pursuit of many scientists. Emerson identified a novel regulator of gene expression in cancer. She identified the functions of the tumour suppressing protein p53, which is mutated in the majority of human cancers and impairs cell cycle arrest apoptosis. Emerson investigated p53 using biochemical and cell-based analyses. She also studied the protein TGF beta 1, a transforming growth factor, which was understood to suppress the development of cancer. Emerson found that once a cell drifts into a precancerous state TGF beta 1 can in fact act to promote cancer. She went on to study how stress response in breast tissue can promote early cancer formation. She has studied the Beta globin gene family, and found it is activated by EKLF, a zinc finger containing transcription factor. She has worked with the California Institute for Regenerative Medicine.

In 2017 Emerson filed a gender discrimination lawsuit against the Salk Institute. She led a report that assessed the culture of the Salk Institute for Biological Studies, finding that women were less likely to be hired and received the smallest labs, despite raising more National Institutes of Health funding. In April 2018 the story broke that Inder Verma had been serially harassing women at the Salk Institute, and Emerson had been one of his victims in September 2001. He was put on administrative leave and subsequently resigned before the board of trustees took action in June 2018. Emerson's case went to trial and was settled in November 2018. Emerson spent over thirty years at the Salk Institute for Biological Studies. She left in 2017, when her contract was not renewed as she did not secure grant funding to pay for half of her salary. She joined the Oregon Health & Science University, where she is a Distinguished Scientists who directs research initiatives.

She was named a Fellow of the American Association for the Advancement of Science in 2015.
