= Alexander Hoffmann =

Alexander Hoffmann may refer to:

- Alexander Hoffmann (biologist) (fl. 1990s–2010s), German-American biologist
- Alexander Hoffmann (politician) (born 1975), German politician of the Christian Social Union

== See also ==
- Alex Hofmann (born 1980), motorcycle racer
