= 1975 Star World Championships =

International sailing competition

The 1975 Star World Championships were held on Lake Michigan, United States in 1975.

== Results ==
Results of individual races
Pos	Boat name	Crew	Country	I	II	III	IV	V	VI	Tot
Gold medal	Dingo	James M. Schoonmaker (H); Jerry Ford	United States	6	7	1	2	3	1	357
Silver medal	Impossible	Tom Blackaller (H); Ron Anderson	United States	28	1	2	5	7	3	352
Bronze medal	Virgo III	Peter Wright (H); Bill Wright	United States	3	11	6	1	1	WDR	348
4	Big If	Thompson Adams (H); Bill Richards	United States	10	3	11	9	4	6	338
5	Too Late	Jim Lippincott (H); Chris Schmidt	United States	8	9	7	16	6	13	327
6	Something Else	Dave Peterson (H); Carlos Monte	United States	5	WDR	5	4	16	14	326
7	Windy Too	Jay C. Winberg (H); Earl Lasher	United States	23	12	4	13	11	12	318
8	Gem	Durward Knowles (H); Steven Kelly	Bahamas	7	10	25	23	5	9	316
9	Dolphin VII	Frank Raymond (H); William Lane	United States	13	13	17	10	20	2	315
10	Tranquil	John W. Bennett (H); Kim Fletcher	United States	9	DSQ	34	6	2	5	314
11	Star of the Sea	Joseph R. Duplin (H); Francis Dolan	United States	15	8	13	8	21	WDR	305
12	Suzanne	Barton S. Beek (H); Charles Beek	United States	11	24	15	7	22	11	304
13	Slider	Mark Reynolds (H); Jim Reynolds	United States	4	16	31	3	65	31	295
14	Mustard Seed	Jim Allsopp (H); Mike Gubin	United States	14	18	22	24	43	4	288
15	Sanctuary	Malin Burnham (H); John Burnham	United States	12	25	39	33	8	8	284
16	Up Yaws	Ted Rapp (H); Ted Rapp III	United States	17	2	51	26	24	17	284
17	Jaws	Larry Whipple (H); Jim Alexander	United States	27	4	30	DSQ	13	15	281
18	Fjord Star	Tog Rogers (H); Al Townsend	United States	24	5	26	17	34	19	279
19	Humbug XV	Chuck Driscoll (H); Jim Oberg	United States	20	22	35	11	32	7	278
20	Lady Bug	William F. Gerard (H); Sheridah Gerard	United States	21	17	3	14	41	WDR	274
21	Griffin	Skip Elliott (H); John Riddell	United States	26	14	16	22	40	18	274
22	Nate	Heinz Nixdorf (H); Josef Pieper	West Germany	16	23	32	28	10	23	270
23	Spirit	J. M. MacCausland (H); Victor Oberg	United States	42	15	19	34	15	22	265
24	Aquarius	S. Prinsenberg (H); Dirk Prinsenberg	Canada	WDR	16	8	47	25	20	254
25	Misty	John W. Allen (H); John Ahlquist	United States	1	20	21	53	49	25	254
26	Big Bird	George F. Thomas (H); Charles Hurlbut	United States	22	WDR	14	15	38	28	253
27	Mint Chip	Roger Doane (H); Rbt Van Wagnen	United States	45	54	20	12	9	34	250
28	Sashay	Thomas Oller (H); Bob Maine	United States	35	29	18	29	30	16	248
29	Shrew	William Parks (H); Jim Machin	United States	2	37	38	37	47	10	246
30	Pummel X	Detlef Kuke (H); Joerg Ricken	West Germany	34	43	12	WDR	17	21	243
31	Shadaw	John Cram (H); Walter Cram	United States	19	28	49	20	12	WDR	242
32	Tenacious	Dick Slayter (H); Fritz Kunzel	United States	36	19	24	41	29	WDR	221
33	Home Grown	Doug Smith (H); Keith Yeates	United States	16	41	58	19	26	46	220
34	Super Toy	John McKeague (H); Otie Ingraham	United States	25	38	10	48	35	WDR	214
35	Gemini	Peter de Manio (H); Henry Mullen	United States	44	42	60	31	14	32	207
36	SS	Gary Schlegel (H); Harold Erlandso	Canada	43	21	47	DSQ	19	35	205
37	Surprise	Jack T. Rickard (H); Frank Murphy	United States	50	27	23	40	62	27	203
38	Sea Eagle	John Slack (H); John Schuhsler	United States	54	51	46	25	31	26	191
39	One Over Par	Ruse Bogie (H); Rik Alexanderson	United States	31	32	WDR	18	28	DNS	187
40	Alpha Centauri	Ian Elliott (H); Jeff Cozzens	United States	37	33	54	49	42	24	185
41	Donnybrook	Jack Lynch (H); Bob Larsen	United States	32	39	WDR	30	58	30	181
42	Gadfly Too	Bruce Dougherty (H); Gary Miller	United States	30	44	28	50	37	WDR	181
43	October	Eugene T. McCarthy (H); Glenn McCarthy	United States	39	53	48	27	48	33	175
44	Easy Rider II	Jim Thompson (H); James Foster	United States	63	60	9	21	44	DNS	173
45	Swiss Miss II	John Mueller (H); Jack Wilkins	United States	52	35	41	52	36	38	168
46	Cow Chip III	Charles McManus (H); John Trolley	United States	57	45	42	36	23	WDR	167
47	Magic	Robert Rodgers (H); Donald Casey, Jr.	United States	48	50	29	44	60	40	159
48	Siderius II	Dexter Richards (H); Per Rappestad	United States	62	59	43	39	27	43	159
49	Symphony	Tom Linville (H); Geoff Bullard	United States	29	49	36	42	63	DNS	151
50	Glider	Walter von Hütschler (H); Thomas Heimann	Brazil	DSQ	34	27	51	46	WDR	138
51	Debbie III	A. Osterwalder (H); Toni Hartl	Switzerland	40	46	55	56	64	36	137
52	Squid	Jeffrey Aldred (H); Chris Latham	United States	49	48	61	35	WDR	45	132
53	Hornet	William Suson (H); Sam Owings	United States	DNS	36	56	58	37	37	130
54	Robin	Robert Ferguson (H); Rbt Van Peenan	United States	WDR	31	40	46	50	DNS	129
55	Conquest	Neil McConagby (H); Neil McConagby	United States	56	WDR	37	38	39	WDR	126
56	Fiamma	Robert O'Neil (H); Paul Colianni	United States	47	DNS	53	54	18	WDR	124
57	Natty III	A. V. Nicholson (H); Dave Stephenson	United States	DNS	26	52	45	52	WDR	121
58	Puff	Cal Hadden (H); Clint Berkey	United States	41	30	WDR	32	WDR	DNS	119
59	Blue Chip III	David Gaillard (H); Jack Levedahl	United States	51	52	67	64	56	29	118
60	Quick Silver Girl	Marc Hulburt (H); Allen Hartung	United States	61	56	WDR	59	33	44	117
61	Islander	Richard Bliss (H); Richard Rottier	United States	55	55	67	61	45	42	112
62	Amuck	Gunnar Dahl (H); Börje Olsson	Sweden	53	DNS	45	55	59	41	111
63	Cutty Sark	George Brothers (H); Jenn Brothers	United States	46	58	57	66	51	48	110
64	Solid Gold	Philip Noren (H); Dick Forester	United States	64	40	64	62	61	39	104
65	Silkie	Richard Wait (H); Chris Rogers	United States	65	47	59	60	54	47	103
66	Yellow Bird	John Robinson (H); D. N. Rindsberg	United States	60	57	33	63	55	DNS	102
67	Spankuk	Chresten Jensen (H); Kristian Kirsten	United States	33	WDR	50	57	70	WDR	86
68	Demon VIII	Kenneth Cole (H); Tom Londrigan	United States	38	WDR	44	DSQ	69	DNS	71
69	Chameleon	At Atkinson (H); Glenn Atkinson	United States	68	63	68	69	67	49	55
70	Chinook	William Kieser, Jr. (H); Tom Kilfoyle	United States	53	61	63	68	71	WDR	54
71	Shenanigans	Dave Wilber (H); Robert Behlen	United States	58	WDR	WDR	43	68	WDR	53
72	The Village Idiot	Ned Rawn (H); Dave McCurdy	United States	66	62	66	67	57	WDR	52
73	Rumble	Gerry Cayne (H); Bob Banks	United States	67	WDR	65	65	66	DNS	33

Legend: DNS – Did not start; DSQ – Disqualified; WDR – Withdrew;
