= Inder Verma =

American–Indian molecular biologist

- Born: Inder Mohan Verma; 28 November 1947 (age 78); Sangrur, Punjab, India
- Education: Lucknow University; Massachusetts Institute of Technology; Weizmann Institute of Science
- Known for: Cancer, gene therapy, NF-kB
- Awards: Member of the National Academy of Sciences (1997); EMBO Member (1998)
- Scientific career
- Fields: Molecular Biology
- Workplaces: Salk Institute for Biological Studies
- Academic advisors: David Baltimore

Inder Mohan Verma (born 28 November 1947) is an Indian American molecular biologist, the former Cancer Society Professor of Molecular Biology in the Laboratory of Genetics at the Salk Institute for Biological Studies and the University of California, San Diego, and former editor-in-chief of the journal Proceedings of the National Academy of Sciences of the United States of America (PNAS). He is recognized for seminal discoveries in the fields of cancer, immunology, and gene therapy.

In 2017, three female professors filed separate lawsuits against the Salk Institute for Biological Studies, alleging systemic gender discrimination in compensation, funding, laboratory resources, and professional advancement. Two of the complaints identified Verma as an influential senior faculty member whose conduct allegedly contributed to the discriminatory environment.

In April 2018, in a separate matter, Science published accounts from eight women who accused Verma of sexual harassment between 1976 and 2016. Verma denied the allegations. He resigned as editor-in-chief of the journal PNAS in May 2018 and from the Salk Institute in June 2018 while the institute's board was considering the findings of an outside investigation.

== Early life and education ==
Inder M. Verma was born in 1947 in Sangrur, Punjab, India and educated at Lucknow University. He received his Ph.D. from the Weizmann Institute of Science in Israel in 1971.

== Career and research ==
After his PhD, Verma conducted his postdoctoral research in the laboratory of Nobel laureate David Baltimore at MIT. In 1974, Verma joined the Salk Institute as an assistant professor. He was promoted to associate professor in 1979, and professor in 1985. He also holds an adjunct professor appointment at the University of California, San Diego. Among his professional activities, he is a member of the Board of Scientific Governors of The Scripps Research Institute. He is currently at the center of a lawsuit alleging systematic discrimination against women scientists at the Salk Institute.

Verma's work on viruses and cancer led to the identification of several oncogenes, including c-fos, c-jun, v-mos and their function in normal cells. His development of virus mediated gene transfer techniques, including a stripped down version of HIV, the lentiviral vector, has become the foundation for gene therapy to cure several congenital as well as adult onset diseases including cancer. Lentiviral vectors are routinely used in molecular biology laboratories in numerous applications, and in clinical gene therapy they are the most commonly used vector for CAR-T cell immunotherapy.

=== Salk Institute gender-discrimination lawsuits ===
In July 2017, Salk professors Victoria Lundblad, Katherine Jones, and Beverly M. Emerson filed separate lawsuits against the Salk Institute, alleging systemic gender discrimination in compensation, access to private funding, laboratory resources, and professional advancement. The lawsuits were brought against the institute and were distinct from the sexual-harassment allegations against Verma that were published the following year.

Two of the complaints discussed Verma's influence as a senior faculty member. Lundblad alleged that Verma and other senior male faculty repeatedly disparaged senior female scientists at Salk. Salk denied that it had discriminated against the plaintiffs.

Jones and Lundblad settled their lawsuits with Salk in August 2018. The settlement terms were not disclosed, and both remained members of the Salk faculty.

In August 2018, a judge dismissed several claims in Emerson's lawsuit, including her claim that Salk had allowed her contract to expire in retaliation for filing suit, but permitted her discriminatory-treatment claim to proceed. Emerson and Salk settled the remaining litigation in November 2018 on undisclosed terms. None of the three lawsuits went to trial.

=== Sexual-harassment allegations and investigation ===
In April 2018, Science published accounts from eight women—five identified publicly and three anonymous—who accused Verma of incidents of sexual harassment between 1976 and 2016. The women described alleged conduct that included unwanted touching, kissing or attempted kissing, propositions, and comments about their physical appearance in professional settings.

Verma denied the allegations. He stated that he had not inappropriately touched or made sexually charged comments to anyone affiliated with Salk, had not had an intimate relationship with a Salk colleague, and had not used his position to take advantage of anyone.

Science reported that Salk had previously received at least two formal complaints and three other reports concerning Verma's conduct. Some of the women accused the institute of responding inadequately to earlier reports. Salk stated that when officials became aware of allegations of inappropriate conduct, the institute had investigated and responded as it considered appropriate.

The Science article also reported that 15 women contacted by the publication said that they had not experienced harassment while working with or for Verma; several described him as a supportive mentor. An additional 12 women declined or did not respond to interview requests.

Salk placed Verma on administrative leave in April 2018 and commissioned an investigation by an outside party.

On 11 June 2018, Salk announced that its board had met to discuss the investigator's findings and had considered "appropriate responsive action". According to the institute, Verma tendered an unconditional resignation before the board completed its discussions and took formal action; the board then voted unanimously to accept his resignation. Salk declined to disclose the findings, describing the matter as confidential. Contemporary reports therefore did not identify which individual allegations, if any, the investigator had substantiated.

=== Awards and honors ===
- 2009: American Society of Gene and Cell Therapy Outstanding Achievement Award
- 2008: Vilcek Prize in Biomedical Sciences
- 2008: AAISCR Lifetime Achievement Award
- 2006: Member of the American Philosophical Society
- 2005: Foreign Fellow, Indian National Science Academy (INSA)
- 2000: Fellow, American Academy of Arts and Sciences (revoked)
- 1999: Member, Institute of Medicine of The National Academy of Sciences (USA)
- 1998: Associate Member, European Molecular Biology Organization (EMBO)
- 1997: Elected a Member of the National Academy of Sciences (USA)
- 1997: Foreign Fellow, The National Academy of Sciences, India
- 1997: Fellow, American Society for Microbiology
- 1990: American Cancer Society Professor of Molecular Biology
- 1988: NIH Outstanding Investigator Award
- 1987: NIH MERIT Award

== Personal life ==
He married Grietje van der Woude in 1973. They have a daughter Simone, who lives in La Jolla. They have twin granddaughters, Sophie and Marijke.
