= Tumor Biology =

- Discipline: Oncology
- Language: English
- Edited by: Magdalena Chechlinska

Publication details
- Former names: Oncodevelopmental Biology and Medicine
- History: 1980–present
- Publisher: SAGE Publications
- Frequency: Bimonthly
- Impact factor: 3.650 (2016)

Standard abbreviations
- ISO 4: Tumor Biol.

Indexing
- CODEN: TUMBEA
- ISSN: 1010-4283 (print); 1423-0380 (web)
- OCLC no.: 888471818

Links
- Journal homepage; Online archive

Tumor Biology (also Tumour Biology) is a bimonthly peer-reviewed open access medical journal covering clinical and experimental oncology. It was established in 1980 as Oncodevelopmental Biology and Medicine, obtaining its current name in 1984. It is owned by the International Society of Oncology and BioMarkers, of which it is the official journal. Originally published by Karger Publishers, it moved to Springer Science+Business Media beginning in 2010. In December 2016, the journal moved again, this time to SAGE Publications. The editor-in-chief is Magdalena Chechlinska (Curie Institute, Warsaw). According to the Journal Citation Reports, the journal has a 2016 impact factor of 3.650.

== Editors ==
Tumor Biology's founding editor-in-chief was William H. Fishman (La Jolla Cancer Research Foundation), who edited the journal along with Hidematsu Hirai (Hokkaido University) from 1980 to 1983. In 1984, A. Munro Neville (Ludwig Institute for Cancer Research) took over as editor-in-chief, and in 1995, he was replaced by Sabine von Kleist (Albert Ludwigs University of Freiburg). In 1999, von Kleist retired, at which point she was replaced by Torgny Stigbrand (Umea University), who was still the journal's editor as of May 2017.

In May 2017, Science Insider reported that multiple scientists listed on the journal's website as being members of its editorial board had no affiliation with the journal. One scientist, German Nobel laureate Harald zur Hausen, told Science Insider that he did not know he was on the list, and that he did not recall having ever reviewed a paper for the journal.

== Retractions and delisting ==
In April 2017, Springer announced it was retracting 107 papers that had been published in Tumor Biology while they were publishing it. According to Retraction Watch, this made Tumor Biology the journal with the most retracted articles out of all the journals indexed by the Web of Science at the time. The cited reason for the retractions was that the papers in question had been accepted on the basis of fake peer reviews. Specifically, the authors of the now-retracted studies had supplied fraudulent email addresses to external reviewers which purportedly belonged to their "recommended reviewers". This led to these papers receiving fake reviews and eventually being published.

In response, the Ministry of Science and Technology of the People's Republic of China announced that it would investigate the retractions, as all 107 papers were co-authored by Chinese researchers. In July, the Ministry announced that, based on the results of its investigation, it would punish the Chinese researchers who co-authored the retracted papers with disciplinary actions, including banning some of them from conducting additional research. In August, Clarivate Analytics announced that articles published in the journal after July 19, 2017, would no longer be included in the Web of Science.. Two statements along with a brief report regarding the true identity of the author (Javad Javanbakht, Former Ph.D student at University of Tehran) responsible for identity fraud and the consequent batch retraction of papers in the journal of Tumor Biology and Diagnostic pathology were published in where Dr. Aram Mokarizadeh as a victim disclosed the identity fraud conducted by Javad Javanbakht (12)(13)(14).
