= Soumen Basak =

Indian immunologist and virologist

- Born: Kolkata, West Bengal, India
- Education: University of Calcutta; University of California, San Diego
- Known for: Studies on NF-kappaB signaling system
- Awards: 2018 N-BIOS Prize; 2019 SSB Prize
- Scientific career
- Fields: Immunology
- Workplaces: National Institute of Immunology
- Doctoral advisor: Prof. Dhrubajyoti Chattopadhyay; Prof. Alexander Hoffmann

Soumen Basak is an Indian immunologist and virologist at the National Institute of Immunology (NII). A former fellow of the Wellcome Trust DBT India Alliance, he is known for his studies on the NF-kappaB signaling system.

== Career ==
Soumen earned an M.Sc. from the Biochemistry department of the University of Calcutta in 1998, and then joined the same department to carry out doctoral research under the guidance of Prof. Dhrubajyoti Chattopadhyay. Subsequent to receiving a Ph.D. degree in 2003, he joined the laboratory of Prof. Alexander Hoffmann at the University of California, San Diego for post-doctoral studies. On his return to India in 2010, he joined the National Institute of Immunology where he has been heading the Systems Immunology Research Group since then.

Soumen has contributed substantially to developing an understanding of immune regulatory mechanisms. Extracellular cues engage discrete cell signaling pathways to control dynamically specific sets of transcription factors, which trigger distinct gene-expression programs. However, a myriad of biochemical processes links these pathways within an integrated cellular network. More so, mammalian cells in their anatomic niche receive signals simultaneously from a variety of stimuli that generate plausible crosstalks between concomitantly activated intracellular pathways. Combining biochemistry, mouse genetics, and computational modeling tools, Soumen's group has been characterizing how such cross-regulatory signaling mechanisms tune immune responses and if aberrant signaling crosstalk underlies human diseases. His work established physiological functions of such signaling crosstalk in tuning inflammatory responses to gut pathogens and in orchestrating immune homeostasis in the secondary lymphoid organs. His research also captured a pathophysiological role of signaling crosstalk in neoplastic diseases – aberrant crosstalk provoked anomalous gene expressions in multiple myeloma. Soumen's current work indicates that cross-regulatory NF-kappaB controls may have ramifications for pathological intestinal inflammation. Soumen has published his research findings in a series of research articles in internationally renowned, peer-reviewed journals. Unchecked inflammation has been implicated in human ailments. Mainstay signaling pathways mediate multiple biological functions, and their therapeutic targeting leads to devastating side effects. In this context, Soumen's finding bears promises for disease-specific interventions in inflammation-associated diseases that target newly discovered crosstalk motif delinking inflammatory module from the integrated network.

The Department of Biotechnology of the Government of India awarded him with the National Bioscience Award for Career Development in 2018 for his outstanding research contributions. In 2019, Soumen was conferred with the prestigious Shanti Swarup Bhatnagar Prize for Science and Technology, the highest civilian award conferred to Indian scientists, for his exceptional contributions in biological sciences by the Council of Scientific and Industrial Research. Soumen is a member of the Guha Research Conference, and also a fellow of all three Indian Science Academies, namely the Indian National Science Academy, the Indian Academy of Sciences, and the National Academy of Sciences, India. In 2020, Soumen became a laureate of the Asian Scientist 100 by the Asian Scientist.

== Selected bibliography ==
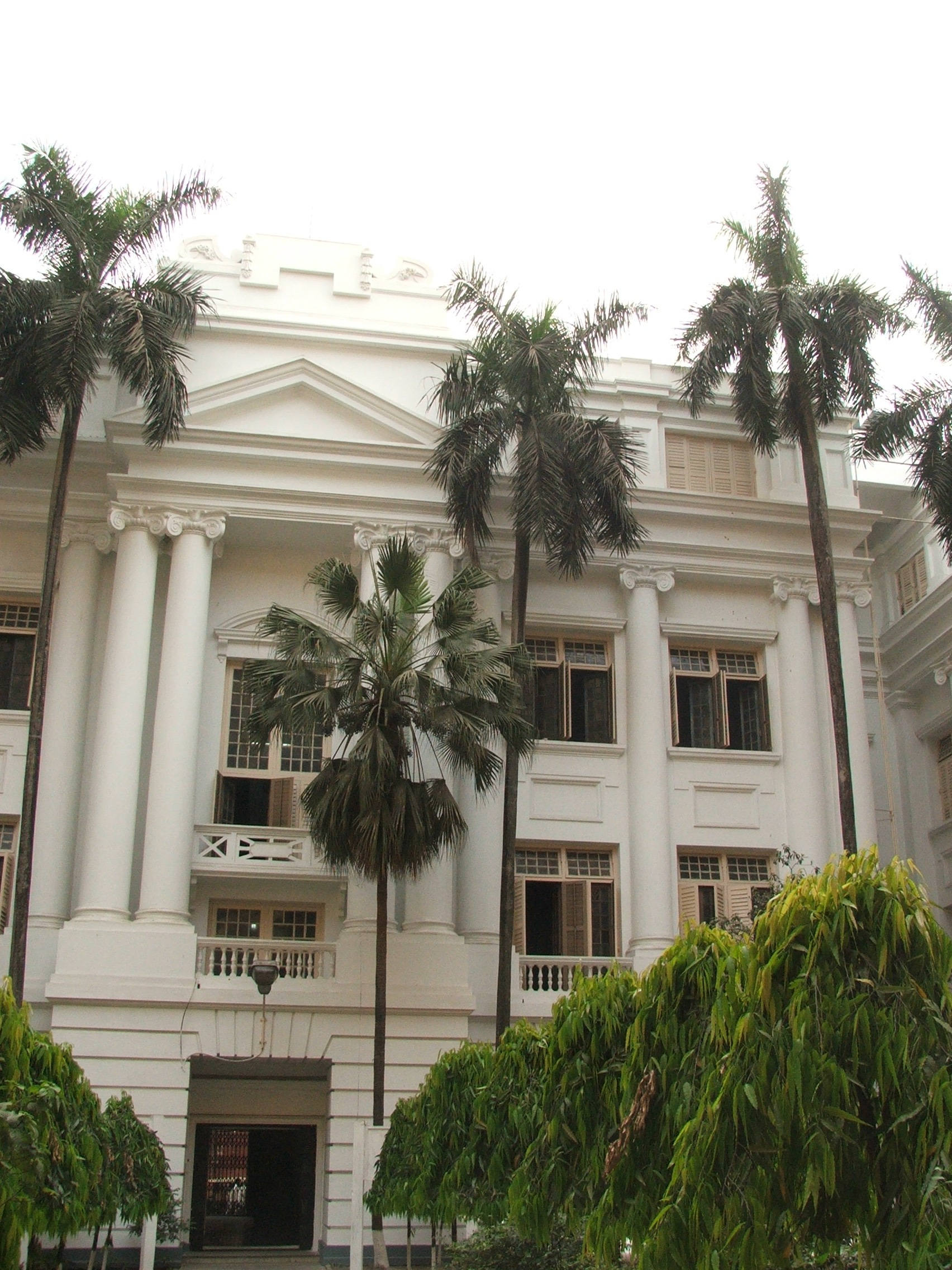
University of Calcutta

- Chawla, Meenakshi; Mukherjee, Tapas; Deka, Alvina; Chatterjee, Budhaditya; Sarkar, Uday Aditya; Singh, Amit K.; Kedia, Saurabh; Lum, Josephine; Kaur, Manpreet; Banoth, Balaji; Biswas, Subhra K.; Ahuja, Vineet; Basak, Soumen (22 June 2021). "An epithelial Nfkb2 pathway exacerbates intestinal inflammation by supplementing latent RelA dimers to the canonical NF-kB module". PNAS. 118 (25) e2024828118. Bibcode:2021PNAS..11824828C. doi:10.1073/pnas.2024828118. PMC 8237674. PMID 34155144.
- Chawla, Meenakshi; Roy, Payel; Basak, Soumen (1 February 2021). "Role of the NF-kB system in context-specific tuning of the inflammatory gene response". Current Opinion in Immunology. 68: 21–27. doi:10.1016/j.coi.2020.08.005. PMID 32898750. S2CID 221572636.
- Mukherjee, Tapas; Chatterjee, Budhaditya; Dhar, Atika; Bais, Sachendra S; Chawla, Meenakshi; Roy, Payel; George, Anna; Bal, Vineeta; Rath, Satyajit; Basak, Soumen (23 October 2017). "A TNF-p100 pathway subverts noncanonical NF-kB signaling in inflamed secondary lymphoid organs". EMBO J. 36 (23): 3501–3516. doi:10.15252/embj.201796919. PMC 5709727. PMID 29061763.
- Roy, Payel; Chatterjee, Budhaditya; Mukherjee, Tapas; Vijayraghvan, Bharath; Banoth, Balaji; Basak, Soumen (1 March 2017). "Non-canonical NF-kB mutations reinforce pro-survival TNF response in multiple myeloma through an autoregulatory RelB:p50 NF-kB pathway". Oncogene. 36 (10): 1417–1429. doi:10.1038/onc.2016.309. PMC 5346295. PMID 27641334.
- Basak, Soumen; Kim, Ha Na; Kearns, Jeff; Tergaonkar, Vinay; Odea, Ellen; Werner, Chris A. Benedict; Ware, Carl F.; Ghosh, Gouri; Verma, Inder M.; Hoffmann, Alexander (26 January 2007). "A fourth IkB protein in the NF-kB signaling module". Cell. 128 (2): 369–381. doi:10.1016/j.cell.2006.12.033. PMC 1831796. PMID 17254973.

== See also ==
- Immune system
- NF-kappaB
- Japanese Encephalitis
- Chandipura virus
