= Robert G. Roeder =

American biochemist

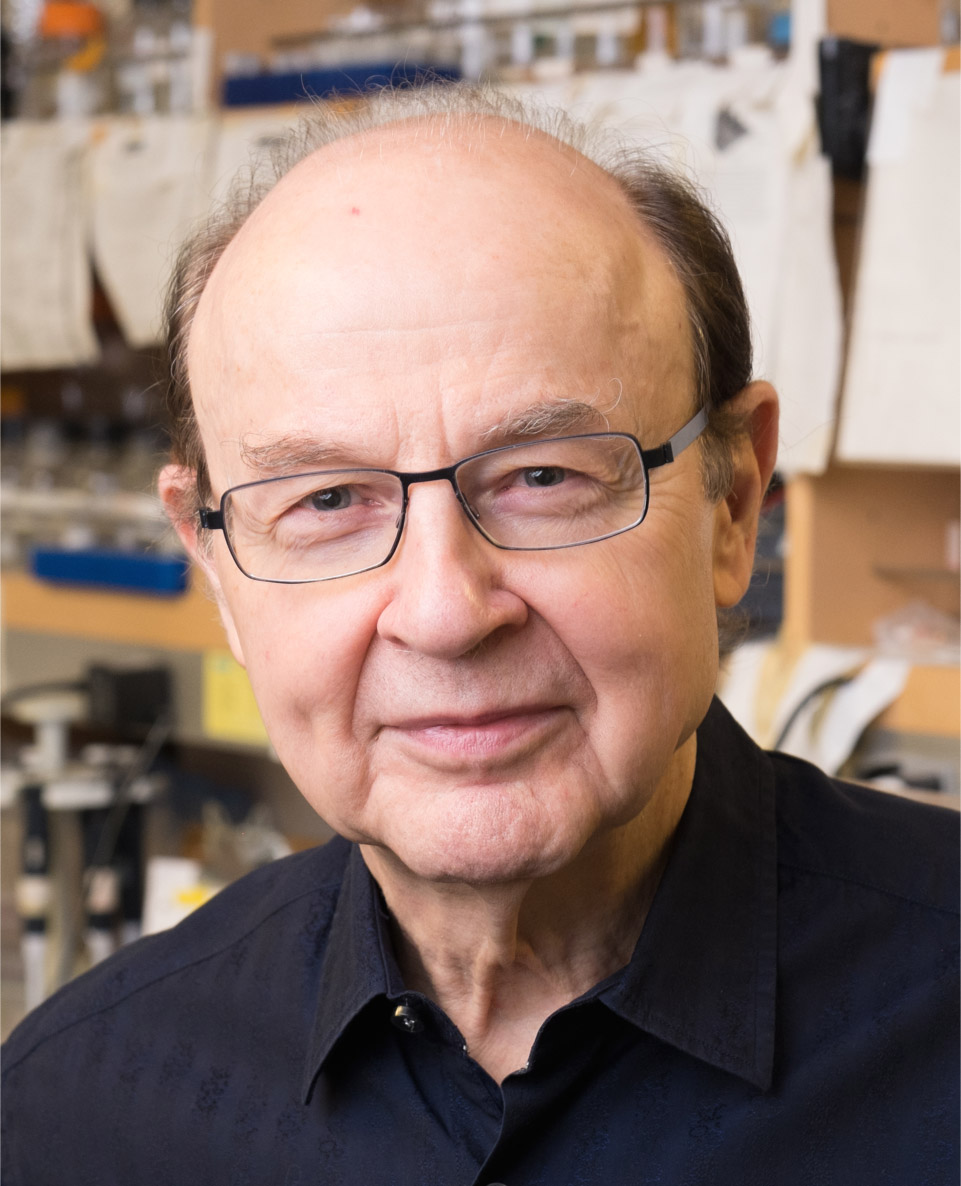
- Born: Robert Gayle Roeder; June 3, 1942 (age 84); Boonville, Indiana, United States
- Education: University of Washington, University of Illinois, Wabash College
- Known for: Eukaryotic transcription; Regulation of gene expression
- Awards: Louisa Gross Horwitz Prize (1999); Gairdner Foundation International Award (2000); Albert Lasker Award for Basic Medical Research (2003); Kyoto Prize (2021)
- Scientific career
- Fields: Biochemistry; Molecular Biology
- Workplaces: Washington University in St. Louis; Rockefeller University
- Thesis: Multiple RNA Polymerases and RNA Synthesis in Eukaryotic Systems (1969)
- Doctoral advisor: William J. Rutter
- Other academic advisors: Donald D. Brown
- Doctoral students: Michael Green; Alexander Hoffmann; Beverly M. Emerson

Robert Gayle Roeder (born June 3, 1942, in Boonville, Indiana, United States) is an American biochemist. He is known as a pioneer scientist in eukaryotic transcription. He discovered three distinct nuclear RNA polymerases in 1969 and characterized many proteins involved in the regulation of transcription, including basic transcription factors and the first mammalian gene-specific activator over five decades of research. He is the recipient of the Louisa Gross Horwitz Prize in 1999,the Gairdner Foundation International Award in 2000, the Albert Lasker Award for Basic Medical Research in 2003, and the Kyoto Prize in 2021. He currently serves as Arnold and Mabel Beckman Professor and Head of the Laboratory of Biochemical and Molecular Biology at Rockefeller University.

== Biography ==
Roeder was born in Boonville, Indiana, US in 1942. He received his B.A. summa cum laude in chemistry from Wabash College in 1964 and his M.S. in chemistry from the University of Illinois in 1965. He received his Ph.D. in biochemistry in 1969 from the University of Washington, Seattle, where he worked with William J. Rutter. He did postdoctoral work with Donald D. Brown at the Carnegie Institution of Washington, in Baltimore, from 1969 to 1971. He was a member of the faculty at Washington University School of Medicine in St. Louis from 1971 to 1982, when he joined Rockefeller University. In 1985, he was named Arnold and Mabel Beckman Professor. He was elected as a member of the National Academy of Sciences in 1988 and the American Academy of Arts and Sciences in 1995, and a foreign associate member of the European Molecular Biology Organization in 2003.

== Major scientific discoveries ==
- 1969: As a graduate student at the University of Washington, Roeder discovers that three enzymes, called RNA polymerases, directly copy DNA to RNA in eukaryotic organisms ranging from yeast to mammals.
- 1971–1977: As a professor at Washington University in St. Louis, he goes on to show that these enzymes, referred to as Pol I, II and III, have complex subunit structures with both distinct and common polypeptides, recognize and copy distinct classes of genes, respectively, of large ribosomal RNAs, mRNA precursors, and transfer and 5S RNAs.
- 1977–1979: Roeder develops cell-free systems to better study transcription. Composed of the purified RNA polymerases and components extracted from cell nuclei, the systems allow researchers to recreate transcription in a test tube in a way that faithfully mimics the real process in cells.
- 1979–1980: The development of cell-free systems leads to the identification of complex sets of proteins called accessory factors that are essential for each individual RNA polymerase (e.g., TFIIA, TFIIB, TFIIE, TFIIF and TFIIH for Pol II, and TFIIIB and TFIIIC for Pol III) to "read" specific target genes.
- 1980: Roeder identifies the first mammalian gene-specific activator, called TFIIIA. TFIIIA and similar proteins bind to specific DNA sequences and enhance the reading of corresponding target genes. Repressors perform the opposite task by inhibiting a gene's activity.
- 1990s: A decade of research culminates with the discovery of coactivators, large protein complexes that provide a bridge between the activators and repressors and the RNA polymerases and other components of the general transcription machinery.
- 1992: Roeder laboratory demonstrates that coactivators can be ubiquitous, monitoring many genes in a variety of cells, or specific to one particular cell type. Roeder and colleagues introduce the concept of cell specificity after they demonstrate that the coactivator OCA-B, the first cell-specific coactivator, discovered by Roeder in 1992, is unique to immune system B cells.
- 1996: Roeder's laboratory discovers the major conduit for communication between gene-specific activators and the general transcription machinery in animal cells: a giant coactivator (TRAP/SMCC) that consists of about 25 different protein chains and is referred to as the human mediator after its counterpart in yeast.
- 2002: Roeder and colleagues show that a single component of the mediator is essential for the formation of fat cells — a finding that may one day contribute to new treatments for diabetes, heart disease, cancer and other conditions in which the fat-making process breaks down.

== Highly cited papers ==
1. Dignam, J. D.; Lebovitz, R. M.; Roeder, R. G. (March 11, 1983). "Accurate transcription initiation by RNA polymerase II in a soluble extract from isolated mammalian nuclei". Nucleic Acids Research. 11 (5). Oxford University Press (OUP): 1475–1489. doi:10.1093/nar/11.5.1475. ISSN 0305-1048. PMC 325809. PMID 6828386. Times Cited: 12,743
2. Gu, Wei; Roeder, Robert G (1997). "Activation of p53 Sequence-Specific DNA Binding by Acetylation of the p53 C-Terminal Domain". Cell. 90 (4). Elsevier BV: 595–606. doi:10.1016/s0092-8674(00)80521-8. ISSN 0092-8674. PMID 9288740. S2CID 18434280. Times Cited: 3,236
3. Roeder, Robert G (1996). "The role of general initiation factors in transcription by RNA polymerase II". Trends in Biochemical Sciences. 21 (9). Elsevier BV: 327–335. doi:10.1016/S0968-0004(96)10050-5. ISSN 0968-0004. PMID 8870495. Times Cited: 1,511
4. Sawadogo, M (1985). "Interaction of a gene-specific transcription factor with the adenovirus major late promoter upstream of the TATA box region". Cell. 43 (1). Elsevier BV: 165–175. doi:10.1016/0092-8674(85)90021-2. ISSN 0092-8674. PMID 4075392. S2CID 42562115.Times Cited: 1,377
5. Roeder, Robert G.; Rutter, William J. (1969). "Multiple Forms of DNA-dependent RNA Polymerase in Eukaryotic Organisms". Nature. 224 (5216). Springer Science and Business Media LLC: 234–237. Bibcode:1969Natur.224..234R. doi:10.1038/224234a0. ISSN 0028-0836. PMID 5344598. S2CID 4283528. Times Cited: 1,177

== Honors and awards ==
- 1977: American Chemical Society, Eli Lilly Award in Biological Chemistry
- 1986: NAS Award in Molecular Biology
- 1988: Member, National Academy of Sciences
- 1988: Harvey Society Lecturer
- 1990: Honorary Doctor of Science from Wabash College
- 1992: Fellow, American Association for the Advancement of Science
- 1995: Lewis S. Rosenstiel Award for Distinguished Work in Basic Medical Science (shared with Robert Tjian)
- 1995: Passano Award (shared with Robert Tjian)
- 1995: Fellow, American Academy of Arts and Sciences
- 1999: Louisa Gross Horwitz Prize from Columbia University (shared with Pierre Chambon and Robert Tjian)
- 1999: General Motors Cancer Research Foundation's Alfred P. Sloan Prize (shared with Robert Tjian)
- 2000: Gairdner Foundation International Award (shared with Roger D. Kornberg)
- 2001: Dickson Prize in Medicine from University of Pittsburgh
- 2002: Merck Award – American Society for Biochemistry and Molecular Biology (shared with Roger D. Kornberg)
- 2003: Albert Lasker Award for Basic Medical Research
- 2003: Foreign Associate Member, European Molecular Biology Organization
- 2005: Honorary Doctor of Science from Washington University in St. Louis
- 2010: Salk Institute Medal for Research Excellence
- 2012: Albany Medical Center Prize in Medicine and Biomedical Research
- 2016: Herbert Tabor Research Award, American Society for Biochemistry and Molecular Biology
- 2018: Howard Taylor Ricketts Award of the University of Chicago
- 2019: Shitsan Pai International Award, the Biophysical Society of China
- 2021: Kyoto Prize

== Prominent alumni of the Roeder Laboratory ==
The Roeder Laboratory has trained hundreds of students and postdoctoral fellows, many of whom hold independent positions in prominent biomedical research institutions, including Richard A. Bernstein (Northwestern University), Robert B. Darnell (Rockefeller University and HHMI), Beverly M. Emerson (Salk Institute for Biological Studies), Michael R. Green (University of Massachusetts Medical School and HHMI), Wei Gu (Columbia University), Nathaniel Heintz (Rockefeller University and HHMI), Andrew B. Lassar (Harvard Medical School), Carl S. Parker (California Institute of Technology), Ron Prywes (Columbia University), Danny Reinberg (New York University School of Medicine and HHMI), Hazel L. Sive (Massachusetts Institute of Technology and Whitehead Institute) and Jerry Workman (Stowers Institute for Medical Research).
