= Malin Burnham =

American philanthropist and sailor (born 1927)

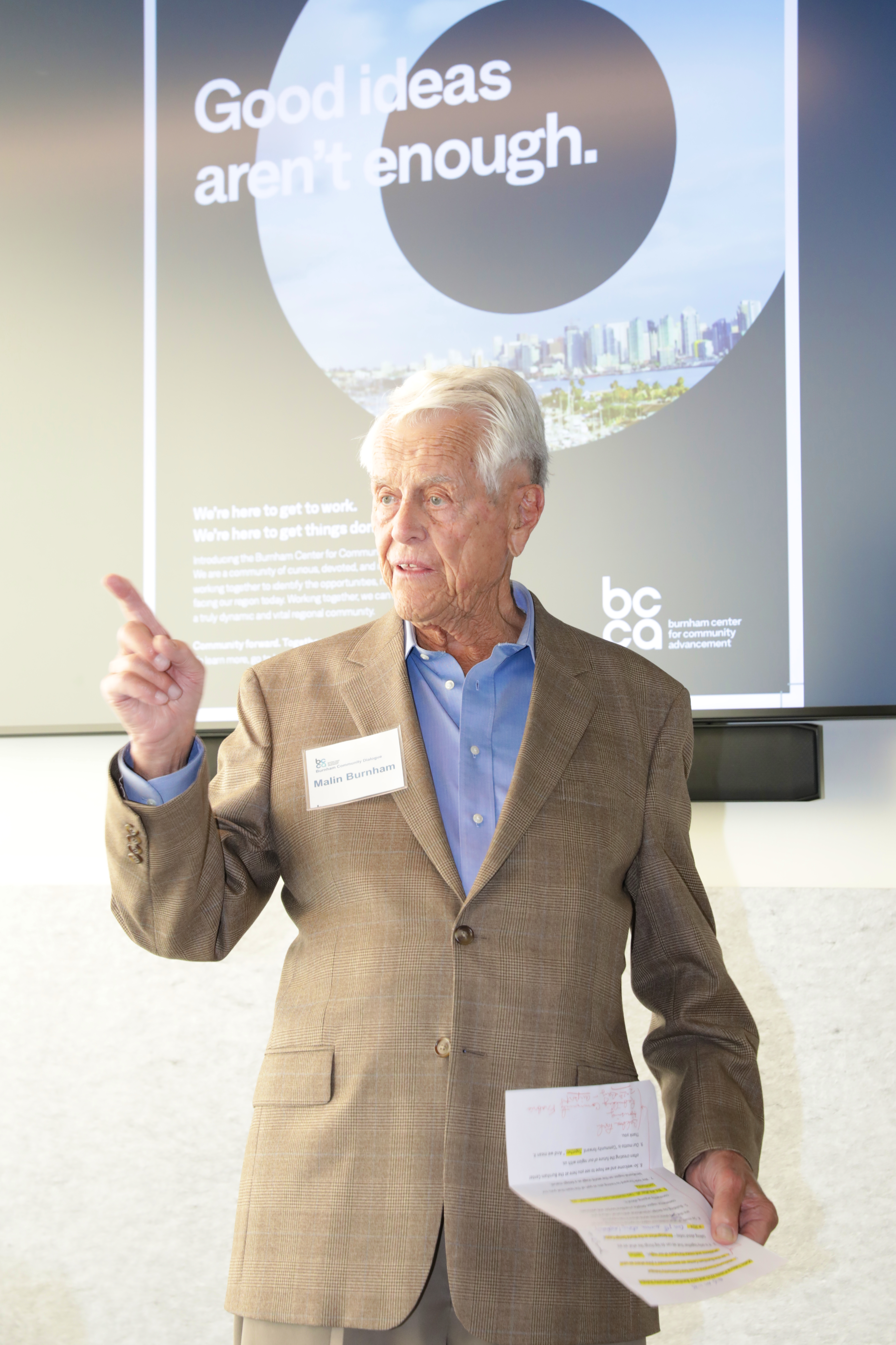
- Born: November 12, 1927 (age 98); San Diego, California, U.S.
- Education: Point Loma High School Stanford University
- Occupations: Philanthropist, real estate developer, sailor
- Spouse: Roberta Burnham (married 1972—present)
- Children: 4

Malin Burnham (born November 12, 1927) is an American sailor, real estate developer and philanthropist from San Diego, California.

Burnham was chairman of John Burnham & Company Insurance and Burnham Real Estate, the family business he joined in 1949, until 2008 when Burnham Real Estate was acquired by global real estate services firm Cushman & Wakefield. He continued to serve as vice chairman and chairman emeritus at Cushman & Wakefield until 2022. Burnham was also an active board member of 16 companies over his career.

Throughout his career, Burnham has dedicated himself to many civic and philanthropic endeavors. He chaired and co-founded numerous organizations, most providing direct benefit to the San Diego region. Some of his most significant contributions include his work to bring the USS Midway to San Diego, the establishment of Sanford Burnham Prebys, one of seven fundamental research institutes in the United States, and in 2021 the founding of the Burnham Center for Community Advancement, a nonprofit think-and-do tank designed to help move the San Diego region forward.

In April 2023, Burnham and his wife Roberta announced a $20 million donation to the Burnham Center for Community Advancement, the couple's largest charitable donation ever given to a single entity.

Burnham is also a world-recognized sailor. At age 17, he became the youngest skipper to win a World Championship in the International Star Class. In 1987, he played a leading role in bringing the America's Cup to San Diego.

Burnham was named “Mr. San Diego” in 1998 and “Philanthropist of the Year” in 2000.

== Early life and education ==
Malin Burnham was born in San Diego, California on November 12, 1927, and graduated from Point Loma High School in 1945. He intended to enlist in the Navy to serve during World War II, having yet to receive a draft notice, but the war with Japan came to an end soon after his graduation. Burnham then attended Stanford University, where he was a walk-on on the sailing team. He became the first member of his family to graduate from college in 1949, receiving a B.S. in Industrial Engineering.

== Sailing ==
Growing up in the Point Loma neighborhood of San Diego, Burnham had a strong interest and talent in competitive sailing. At the age of 17, he won the Star World Championship in 1944 (crewing for Gerald Driscoll) and won it again 1945 (together with Lowell North). Burnham also won four Lipton Cups and three San Francisco Challenge Cups as skipper, racing competitively nationally and internationally for 45 years.

Burnham was involved in the America's Cup competition for three decades. In 1977, he was helmsman and skipper of Enterprise, an S&S-designed 12-metre yacht, in America's Cup defender trials. In 1980, he sailed frequently as helmsman of the trial-horse boat for Dennis Conner's winning Freedom campaign. In 1983 he did the same for the Liberty campaign.

In 1987, he helped bring the America's Cup to San Diego when he founded and served as President & CEO of the Sail America Foundation, which funded and provided logistical support for Dennis Conner's winning Stars & Stripes campaign. In 1988 and 1992 he chaired San Diego Yacht Club's successful defenses of the America's Cup. San Diego hosted the America's Cup in 1988, 1992 and 1995.

Burnham was named to the America's Cup Hall of Fame in 2002 and was inducted into the National Sailing Hall of Fame in 2016. In 2022, the position of assistant sailing coach at Stanford University was endowed as the Malin Burnham Assistant Sailing Coach.

== Career ==
After graduating from Stanford, Burnham returned to San Diego and began working for Burnham Real Estate in 1949. Founded in 1891 by Burnham's grandfather, Burnham Real Estate grew to become one of the region's largest and most diversified full-service real estate companies. Burnham was chairman of the company until it was acquired by global real estate services firm Cushman & Wakefield in 2008.

After the 2008 acquisition, Burnham continued his real estate work as vice chairman at Cushman & Wakefield until his retirement in 2022. Over his career, Burnham has been an active board member of 16 companies and played a role in the founding of three publicly traded companies.

Beginning in 2014 he led a group of San Diegans seeking to acquire the U-T San Diego newspaper from Doug Manchester and run it as a nonprofit entity.

== Philanthropy ==
Burnham is known for his extensive civic and charitable activities in the San Diego region, and is known to carry business cards that read "Community Before Self." Community Before Self is also the title of Burnham's autobiography.

=== Education and medical research ===
Burnham's donations and service to California State University, San Marcos, the University of San Diego, San Diego State University, and University of California, San Diego have contributed to the development of each institution's education, research, and community engagement missions.

In 1996, the La Jolla Cancer Research Foundation was renamed The Burnham Institute after Burnham joined with an anonymous donor to contribute $10 million. It was later renamed the Sanford Burnham Prebys Medical Discovery Institute after generous donations from T. Denny Sanford and Conrad Prebys.

Along with former San Diego Padres owner John Moores, in 2004 Burnham founded the Burnham-Moores Center for Real Estate at the University of San Diego. He has continued to generously support the center, donating an additional $2.3 million in 2019.

Most recently, Burnham committed $3 million to support UC San Diego's first downtown San Diego campus building at Park & Market. His donation created a new "Civic Collaboratory" within the building where the community can come together to focus on advancing the region.

=== Sports ===
In 1987, he helped bring the America's Cup to San Diego when he founded and served as President & CEO of the Sail America Foundation, which funded and provided logistical support for Dennis Conner's winning America's Cup campaign. In 1988 and 1992 he chaired San Diego Yacht Club's successful defenses of the America's Cup.

Burnham has been a longtime member and supporter of San Diego Yacht Club and in 2010 the club named its new $8 million sailing center after the sailing enthusiast.

In 1995, Burnham joined efforts to establish a U.S. Olympic Training Center in Chula Vista, California, which has benefited thousands of Olympians, Paralympians, community groups, and countless visitors from around the world. It is estimated that 369 Olympic medals have been won by individuals who have trained at the center in San Diego.

Burnham is also a former partner/owner of the San Diego Padres and the San Diego Sockers.

=== Tourism ===
Burnham had a significant influence in bringing the USS Midway aircraft carrier to San Diego's waterfront and recreating it into the USS Midway Museum. The museum welcomes over 1 million visitors a year and is the most-visited historic naval ship museum in the world.

In 2013, Burnham was recognized for exemplifying the finest of American ideals with the Midway American Patriot Award, which recognizes individual acts and cumulative lifetime achievements.

Burnham supported the capital campaign to make the Rady Shell at Jacobs Park a reality, which added an iconic cultural center to San Diego's embarcadero waterfront.

=== Board and committee service ===
Burnham has served on many regional boards and committees, including but not limited to:

- Burnham-Moores Center for Real Estate at the University of San Diego, as co-endower
- Downtown San Diego Partnership (formerly San Diegans, Inc.)
- Institute of the Americas
- Kyoto Prize Symposium
- San Diego Foundation, as a founding member and Board of Governors member
- San Diego Regional Chamber of Commerce
- San Diego Regional Economic Development Corporation
- San Diego State University (Campanile Foundation and Fowler College of Business)
- San Diego Strategic Roundtable, as a founder
- San Diego Taxpayers Association
- Sanford Burnham Prebys Medical Discovery Institute
- Sanford Consortium for Regenerative Medicine
- San Diego International Sports Council
- San Diego Hall of Champions
- Smart Border Coalition
- Tri-Hospital Building Fund (Mercy, Sharp and Scripps)
- UC San Diego's Rady School of Management
- United Way of San Diego County
- USS Midway Foundation
- YMCA

Burnham has been awarded many honors because of his civic and philanthropic efforts, including the Midway American Patriot Award, Junior Achievement/San Diego Business Hall of Fame, Philanthropist of the Year, National Society of Fundraising Executives, Civic Entrepreneur of the Year, Mr. San Diego, and recognitions from the San Diego Regional Economic Development Corporation and Rotary Club of San Diego.

== Personal life ==
Burnham and his wife, Roberta, reside in Point Loma, a community of San Diego. Malin Burnham has four children, John, Cathe, Tom, and MaryBeth.
