= Jan Karlseder =

Austrian molecular biologist

- Born: September, 1968 (age 58); Vienna, Austria
- Education: University of Vienna
- Known for: Defining proliferative boundaries

Jan Karlseder (born September 28, 1968, in Innsbruck) an Austrian molecular biologist, is the Chief Science Officer and a Senior Vice President at the Salk Institute for Biological Studies. He is also a professor in the Molecular and Cellular Biology Laboratory, the Director of the Paul F. Glenn Center for Biology of Aging Research and the holder of the Donald and Darlene Shiley Chair at the Salk Institute for Biological Studies.

== Career ==
Karlseder obtained both his M.Sc. and his Ph.D. at the University of Vienna. In 1996, he joined the Laboratory of Titia de Lange at Rockefeller University in New York City for postdoctoral training. He became a faculty member at the Salk Institute for Biological Studies in 2002.

== Research ==
Karlseder discovered that telomere dysfunction plays a role in Werner Syndrome, a premature aging disease that is associated with early onset of cancer. WRN helicase, which is mutated in Werner Syndrome patients, is required for efficient replication of the telomeric G-strand. Without WRN, lagging strand replication frequently stalls at telomeres, leading to loss of one of the sister telomeres during replication and cell division. This telomere loss in turn can lead to telomere end-to-end fusions, fusion-bridge-breakage cycles and genome instability, which is responsible for the heightened cancer incidence in individuals with Werner Syndrome. He went on to show that following DNA replication telomeres are recognized by the intracellular DNA damage machinery. This seemingly paradoxical event turned out to be essential to recruit the machinery that establishes protection at chromosome ends, where the homologous recombination machinery acts to form a structure that is resistant to nucleases and damage repair.

Karlseder’s work on DNA repair pathway choice led to the discovery of the microprotein CYREN, which inhibits error prone non-homologous end-joining during S and G2 phases of the cell cycle, thereby promoting DNA break repair by the error free homologous recombination machinery.

Karlseder discovered that mitotic arrest leads to telomere deprotection, which triggers a stress response that leads to the death of cells that cannot complete mitosis. He demonstrated that this process is at play during replicative crisis, where fused telomeres trigger mitotic arrest and in turn cell death within one or two cell cycles.

Karlseder’s work on recombination-based telomere maintenance (ALT) revealed that constitutive damage signals from shortening telomeres down-regulate histone synthesis, which leads to changes in nucleosome availability and histone chaperone expression. This led to the discovery that replication fork stalling at telomeres plays a major role in the activation of ALT.

He found that cell death in replicative crisis is executed by the autophagy machinery. Autophagy suppression allowed cells to bypass crisis and continue to proliferate with critically short telomeres, accumulating high levels of genome instability, pointing at autophagy as a potent tumor suppressor during the earliest stages of cancer initiation.

Karlseder’s work on connecting telomere dysfunction with inflammation and cell death during replicative crisis identified ZBP1 as novel regulator of the innate RNA sensing machinery. He discovered that cells in replicative crisis use the telomeric transcript TERRA as messenger to sense critically short telomeres. TERRA associates with the innate RNA sensor ZBP1, which in turn forms filaments at the mitochondrial outer membrane, where it activates its adaptor MAVS, resulting in an amplification of an interferon type 1 inflammation response. Karlseder thereby discovered a novel tumor suppressive pathway, which removes aged cells with critically short telomeres, which would be prone to cancerous transformation.
