= Joseph R. Ecker =

American plant biologist and molecular biologist

Joseph R Ecker
- Education: The College of New Jersey; Penn State Milton S. Hershey Medical Center
- Known for: Plant biology and epigenetics
- Awards: 2015 Elected Member, American Academy of Arts and Sciences 2011 George W. Beadle Award, Genetics Society of America; 2006 Elected Member, US National Academy of Sciences; 2007 NAS, John J. Carty Award for the Advancement of Science; 2005 American Society of Plant Biologists, Martin Gibbs Medal 2001 Kumho Science International Award in Plant Molecular Biology
- Scientific career
- Workplaces: University of Pennsylvania Salk Institute for Biological Studies
- Doctoral advisor: Richard Hyman
- Website: https://www.salk.edu/scientist/joseph-ecker/

Joseph R. Ecker is an American molecular biologist. He is Professor and Director of the Genomic Analysis Laboratory at the Salk Institute for Biological Studies. He was an Investigator of the Howard Hughes Medical Institute from 2011-2026. He holds the Salk International Council Chair in Genetics.

He is also an adjunct professor in the Section of Cell and Developmental Biology at the University of California, San Diego.

== Biography ==
Ecker completed a BA degree in biology in 1978 at The College of New Jersey. He then joined the laboratory of virologist Dr. Richard Hyman and studied herpes viruses at the Pennsylvania State University College of Medicine. He joined Ronald W. Davis's lab at Stanford University. In 1987, he was appointed as an assistant professor at the Plant Science Institute at the University of Pennsylvania.

== Honors and awards ==
- 2026 – McClintock Prize for Plant Genetics and Genome Studies
- 2024 – ILCHUN Molecular Medicine Award, Korean Society for Molecular and Cellular Biology
- 2024 – Philip N. Benfey Arabidopsis Community Lifetime Achievement (PACLA) Award
- 2014–2025 – Thomson Reuters Highly Cited Researcher
- 2017 – John M. Chemerda Lectures, Pennsylvania State University
- 2015 – Elected Member, American Academy of Arts and Sciences
- 2012 – Elected Fellow, American Association for the Advancement of Science
- 2011 – Investigator, Howard Hughes Medical Institute / Gordon and Betty Moore Foundation
- 2011 – George W. Beadle Award, Genetics Society of America
- 2009 – S. F. Yang Memorial Lecture and Award, S. F. Yang Memorial Foundation (Taiwan)
- 2009 - Time Magazine #2 Scientific Discovery of the Year
- 2007 – John J. Carty Award for the Advancement of Science, National Academy of Sciences
- 2006 – Elected Member, National Academy of Sciences
- 2005 – Martin Gibbs Medal, American Society of Plant Biologists
- 2004 – Scientific American 50: Research Leader of the Year in Agriculture
- 2004 – Distinguished Research Award, International Plant Growth Substances Association
- 2001 – Co-recipient, Kumho Science International Award, Kumho Foundation (Korea)
