= Cyclin-dependent kinase 12 =

Protein kinase found in humans

CDK12

Identifiers
- Aliases: CDK12, CRK7, CRKR, CRKRS, cyclin-dependent kinase 12, cyclin dependent kinase 12
- External IDs: OMIM: 615514; MGI: 1098802; GeneCards: CDK12
Available structures
PDB	Ortholog search: PDBe RCSB
PDB	List of PDB id codes 4CXA, 4NST, 4UN0, 5ACB
Enzyme activity
EC #	BRENDA	ExPASy	KEGG	MetaCyc
2.7.11.22	↗	↗	↗	↗
2.7.11.23	↗	↗	↗	↗

Gene location (Human)
Chr.	Chromosome 17 (human)
Band	17q12	Start	39,461,486 bp
Band	17q12	End	39,564,907 bp

Gene location (Mouse)
Chr.	Chromosome 11 (mouse)
Band	11 D|11 61.75 cM	Start	98,093,885 bp
Band	11 D|11 61.75 cM	End	98,169,330 bp
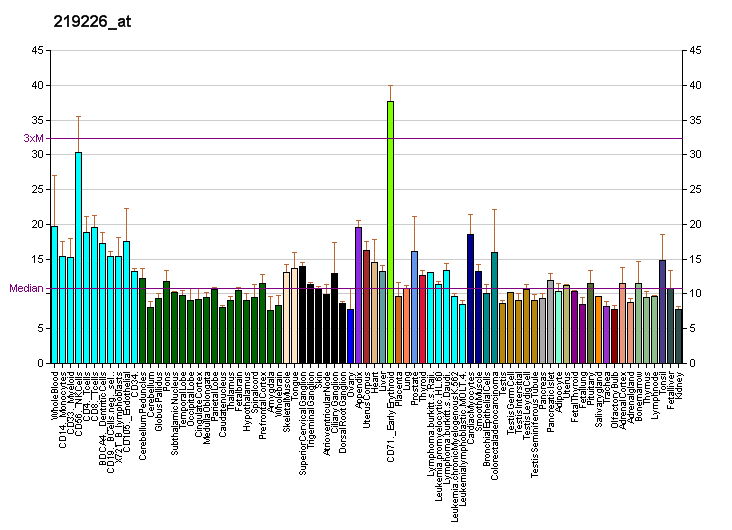

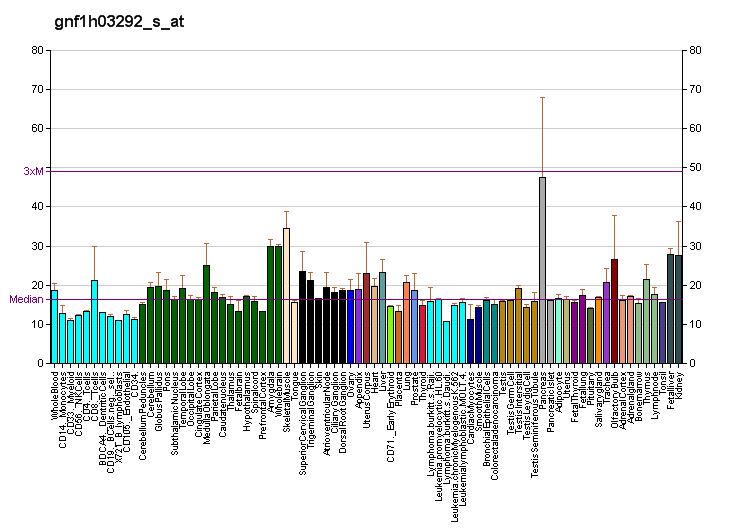
RNA expression pattern
Bgee	Human / Mouse (ortholog); Top expressed in: buccal mucosa cell; sural nerve; secondary oocyte; epithelium of colon; ganglionic eminence; gastric mucosa; ventricular zone; Achilles tendon; skin of leg; tonsil / Top expressed in: zygote; secondary oocyte; ascending aorta; tail of embryo; Rostral migratory stream; aortic valve; genital tubercle; granulocyte; spermatocyte; primary oocyte; More reference expression data
BioGPS	More reference expression data
Gene ontology
Molecular function	transferase activity; protein kinase activity; nucleotide binding; kinase activity; protein serine/threonine kinase activity; protein binding; RNA polymerase II CTD heptapeptide repeat kinase activity; ATP binding; cyclin binding; cyclin-dependent protein serine/threonine kinase activity; transcription factor binding; protein kinase binding
Cellular component	nuclear speck; nuclear cyclin-dependent protein kinase holoenzyme complex; cyclin K-CDK12 complex; nucleus; nucleoplasm; fibrillar center; chromosome; cyclin/CDK positive transcription elongation factor complex; cyclin-dependent protein kinase holoenzyme complex
Biological process	phosphorylation of RNA polymerase II C-terminal domain; phosphorylation; mRNA processing; regulation of cell cycle; protein phosphorylation; regulation of RNA splicing; RNA splicing; protein autophosphorylation; regulation of MAP kinase activity; transcription elongation from RNA polymerase II promoter; positive regulation of transcription by RNA polymerase II; negative regulation of stem cell differentiation; positive regulation of transcription elongation from RNA polymerase II promoter
Sources:Amigo / QuickGO
Orthologs
Databases	NCBI: entry; OMA: entry
Species	Human	Mouse
Entrez	51755	69131
Ensembl	ENSG00000167258	ENSMUSG00000003119
UniProt	Q9NYV4	Q14AX6
RefSeq (mRNA)	NM_015083; NM_016507	NM_001109626; NM_001109628; NM_026952
RefSeq (protein)	NP_055898; NP_057591	NP_001103096; NP_001103098; NP_081228
Location (UCSC)	Chr 17: 39.46 – 39.56 Mb	Chr 11: 98.09 – 98.17 Mb
PubMed search
- Wikidata
View/Edit Human	View/Edit Mouse

Cyclin-dependent kinase 12 (or CDK12) is a protein kinase that in humans is encoded by the CDK12 gene. This enzyme is a member of cyclin-dependent kinase protein family.

The CDK12 gene has been associated to prostate and ovarian cancer susceptibility.
