= Sanford Consortium =

US research institute

Coordinates: 32.88958°N 117.2441°W

- Established: 2011 (building completed)
- President: Edward W. Holmes, M.D.
- Location: 2880 Torrey Pines Scenic Drive, La Jolla, CA 92037, La Jolla, California
- Website: www.sanfordconsortium.com

The Sanford Consortium is a non-profit biomedical research institute in La Jolla, California. It was formed from a collaboration between the Burnham Biomedical Research Institute, Salk Institute for Biological Studies, Scripps Research, La Jolla Institute for Immunology, and the University of California, San Diego. The institute was previously known as the Sanford Consortium for Regenerative Medicine (SCRM).

The 'consortium' research building is 136,700 square-feet. It is located on a 7.5-acre property nearby to and leased from UC San Diego. The development and construction of the building and facilities from 2007 through 2011 cost $106,572,300 in construction and $21,028,500 in equipment acquisition costs.
