= Salk Institute for Biological Studies =

Research institute in California, US

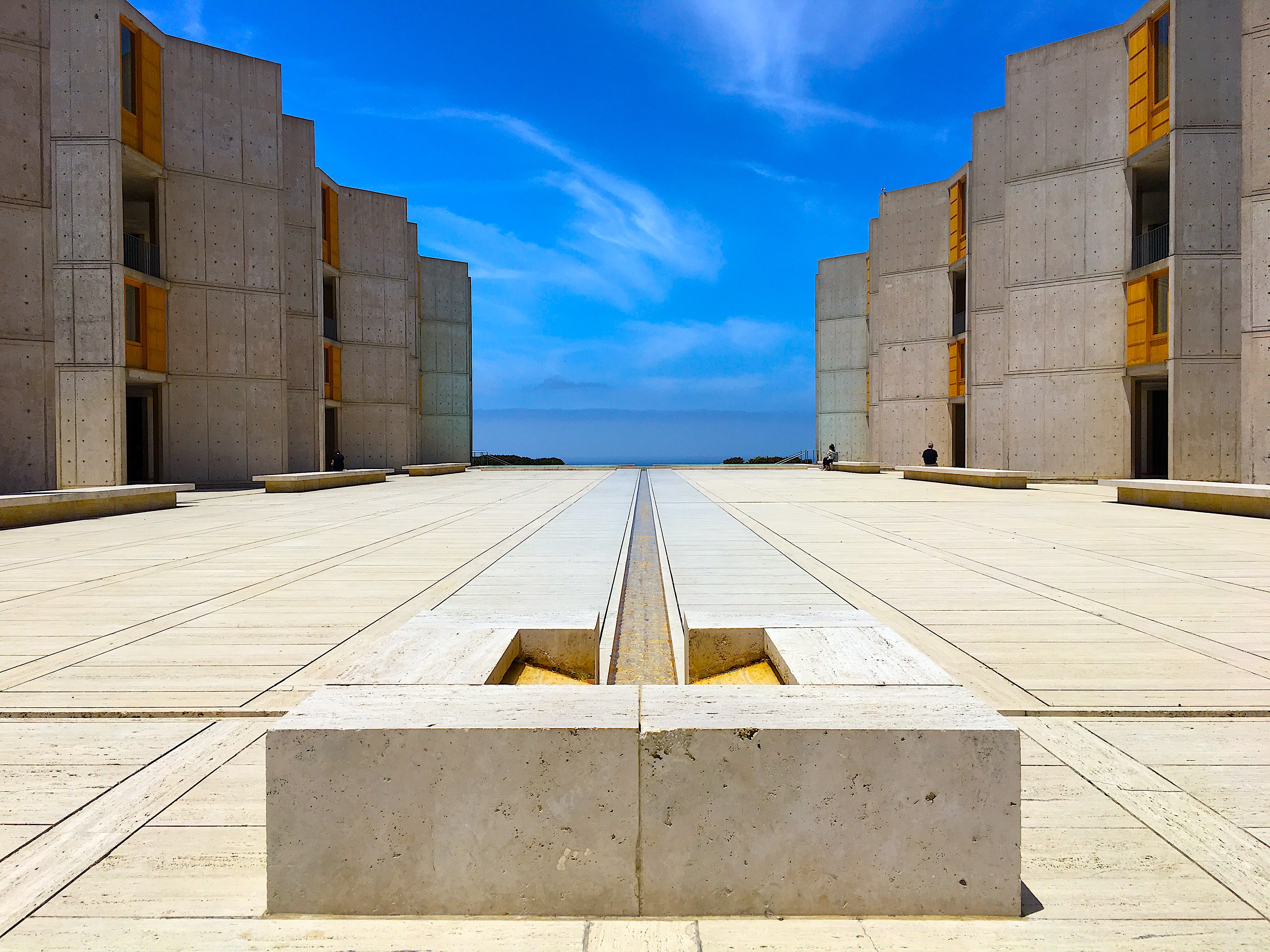
- Salk Institute for Biological Studies in July 2019
- Established: December 28, 1960; 65 years ago
- Research type: Basic
- Field of research: Neuroscience, cancer research, aging, immunobiology, plant biology, computational biology
- President: Gerald Joyce
- Faculty: 48
- Location: 10010 N Torrey Pines Rd, La Jolla, California, 92037, US; 32°53′15″N 117°14′47″W
- Affiliations: University of California, San Diego
- Nobel laureates: Elizabeth Blackburn; Francis Crick; Robert W. Holley; Renato Dulbecco; Sydney Brenner
- Website: salk.edu
- Building details

General information
- Type: Institutional
- Location: San Diego, California, U.S.
- Current tenants: Salk Institute
- Named for: Jonas Salk
- Completed: 1965

Technical details
- Structural system: Vierendeel trusses
- Material: Poured concrete
- Floor count: 4

Design and construction
- Architect: Louis I. Kahn
- Structural engineer: August Komendant
- Awards: American Institute of Architects Twenty-five Year Award

The Salk Institute for Biological Studies is a scientific research institute in the La Jolla community of San Diego, California. The independent, non-profit institute was founded in 1960 by Jonas Salk, the developer of the polio vaccine; among the founding consultants were Jacob Bronowski and Francis Crick. Construction of the research facilities began in spring of 1962. The Salk Institute consistently ranks among the top institutions in the US in terms of research output and quality in the life sciences.

As of October 2020, the Salk Institute employs 850 researchers in 60 research groups and focuses its research in three areas: molecular biology and genetics; neurosciences; and plant biology. Research topics include aging, cancer, diabetes, birth defects, Alzheimer's disease, Parkinson's disease, AIDS, and the neurobiology of American Sign Language. March of Dimes provided the initial funding and continues to support the institute. Research is funded by a variety of public sources, such as the US National Institutes of Health and the government of California; and private organizations such as Paris-based Ipsen, the Howard Hughes Medical Institute and the Waitt Family Foundation. In addition, the internally administered Innovation Grants Program encourages cutting-edge high-risk research. In 2017 the Salk Institute Trustees elected former president of Booz Allen Hamilton, Daniel C. Lewis, as board chairman.

The institute also served as the basis for Bruno Latour and Steve Woolgar's 1979 book Laboratory Life: The Construction of Scientific Facts.

== History ==
Salk and architect Louis I. Kahn approached the city of San Diego in March 1960 about a gift of land on the Torrey Pines Mesa and were granted their request after a referendum in June 1960. The National Foundation for Infantile Paralysis, known today as the March of Dimes, provided the initial funding. Construction began in 1962 and a handful of researchers moved into the first laboratory in 1963. Additional buildings housing more laboratories as well as the organizational administrative offices were constructed in the 1990s, designed by Anshen & Allen.

A golden engraving at the entrance of the institute honors Jonas Salk, bearing the words: “Hope lies in dreams, in imagination and in the courage of those who dare to make dreams into reality.”

Francis Crick held the post of J. W. Kieckhefer Distinguished Research Professor at the Salk Institute. His later research centered on theoretical neurobiology and attempts to advance the scientific study of human consciousness. He remained in this post at the Salk Institute until his death in 2004.

=== 50th anniversary celebration ===
From April 22 to 27, 2010, the Salk Institute hosted glass sculptures by artist Dale Chihuly to celebrate 50 years of its inception. The event was underwritten by Irwin Jacobs, past chairman of the board of trustees.

=== Gender discrimination lawsuits and sexual harassment allegations ===
In July 2017, three of the Salk Institute's senior female scientists, biochemists Beverly M. Emerson and Katherine Jones, and molecular biologist Victoria Lundblad, each filed separate gender discrimination lawsuits against the institute in state court. They alleged that Salk operated as an "old boys' club" in which a group of senior male faculty limited women's access to promotions, funding and laboratory resources, while male colleagues gained influence and received private donations. The lawsuits led to the retirement of Salk president Elizabeth Blackburn in the summer of 2018, and the resignation of board chairman Ted Waitt.

In April 2018, Salk placed cancer biologist Inder Verma, previously named in the lawsuits, on administrative leave and launched an independent investigation after Science reported further sexual harassment allegations against him from eight women in incidents spanning four decades. One professor, Pamela Mellon, said she had reported an incident to Salk's human resources department in the late 1980s and had been told not to share her account with others. Verma denied all allegations and resigned on June 6, 2018. Jones and Lundblad settled their discrimination suits confidentially in August 2018, retaining their positions; Emerson, who had left Salk in 2017, settled separately in November 2018. The institute admitted no liability in any of the settlements.

== Establishing the institute ==
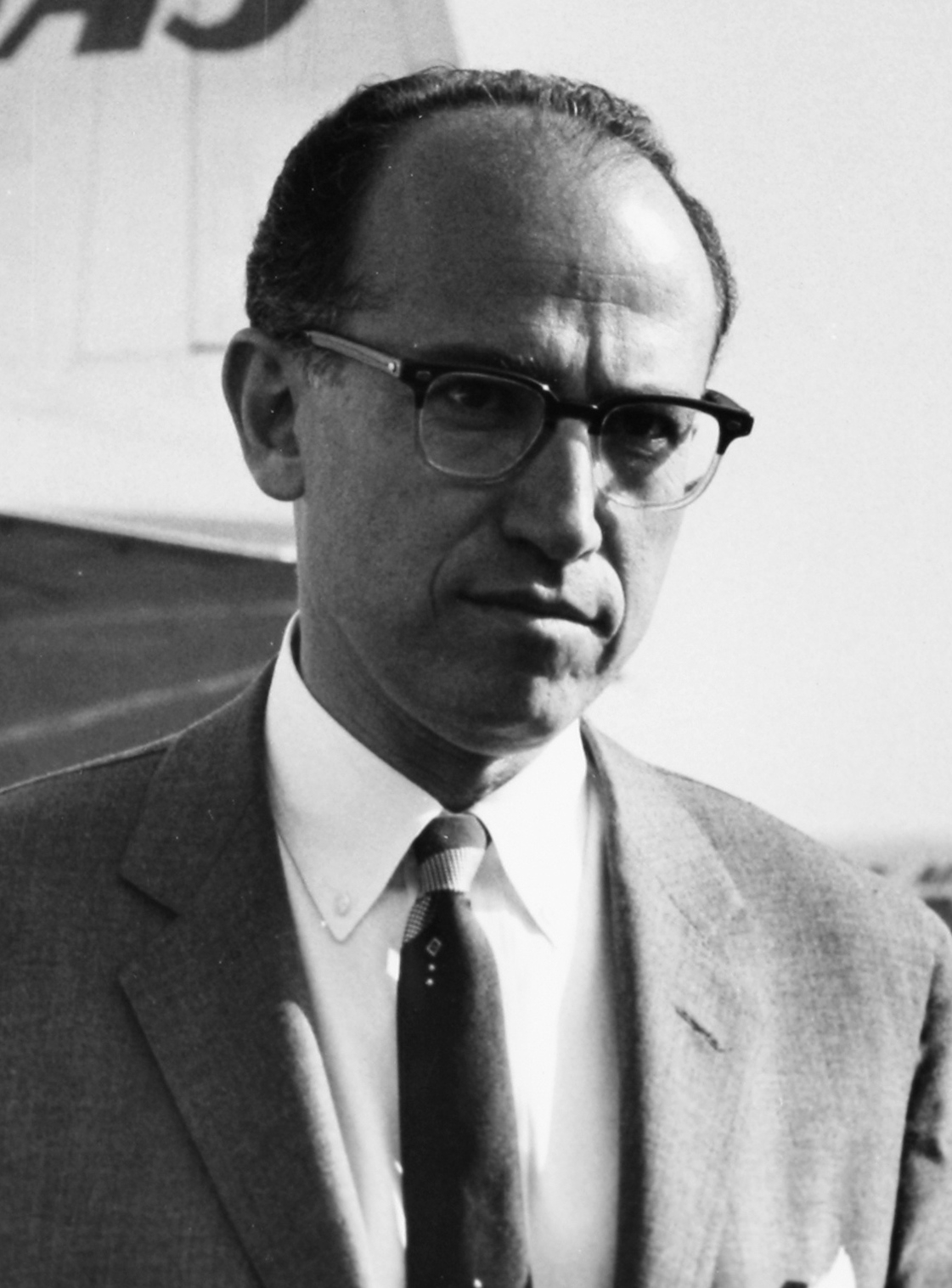
Jonas Salk

Jonas Salk founded the institute in 1963 in the San Diego neighborhood of La Jolla. Salk believed that the institution would help new and upcoming scientists along in their careers, as he said himself, "I thought how nice it would be if a place like this existed and I was invited to work there." Many supporters, in particular the National Foundation, "helped him build his dream of a research complex for the investigation of biological phenomena 'from cell to society'."

In 1966, Salk described his "ambitious plan for the creation of a kind of Socratic academy where the supposedly alienated two cultures of science and humanism will have a favorable atmosphere for cross-fertilization." Author and journalist Howard Taubman explained:

Although he is distinctly future-oriented, Dr. Salk has not lost sight of the institute's immediate aim, which is the development and use of the new biology, called molecular and cellular biology, described as part physics, part chemistry and part biology. The broad-gauged purpose of this science is to understand man's life processes.

There is talk here of the possibility, once the secret of how the cell is triggered to manufacture antibodies is discovered, that a single vaccine may be developed to protect a child against many common infectious diseases. There is speculation about the power to isolate and perhaps eliminate genetic errors that lead to birth defects.

Dr. Salk, a creative man himself, hopes that the institute will do its share in probing the wisdom of nature and thus help enlarge the wisdom of man. For the ultimate purpose of science, humanism and the arts, in his judgment, is the freeing of each individual to cultivate his full creativity, in whichever direction it leads. ... As if to prepare for Socratic encounters such as these, the institute's architect, Louis Kahn, has installed blackboards in place of concrete facings on the walls along the walks.

The New York Times, in a 1980 article celebrating the 25th anniversary of the Salk vaccine, described the current workings at the facility:

At the institute, a magnificent complex of laboratories and study units set on a bluff overlooking the Pacific, Dr. Salk holds the titles of founding director and resident fellow. His own laboratory group is concerned with the immunologic aspects of cancer and the mechanisms of autoimmune disease, such as multiple sclerosis, in which the immune system attacks the body's own tissues.

In an interview about his future hopes at the institute, he said, "In the end, what may have more significance is my creation of the institute and what will come out of it, because of its example as a place for excellence, a creative environment for creative minds."

Francis Crick, codiscoverer of the structure of the DNA molecule, was a leading professor at the institute until his death in 2004.

The institute also served as the basis for Bruno Latour and Steve Woolgar's 1979 book Laboratory Life: The Construction of Scientific Facts.

== Architecture ==
The Salk Institute, La Jolla, California (1959–1965) was to be a campus composed of three clusters: meeting and conference areas, living quarters, and laboratories. Only the laboratory cluster, consisting of two parallel blocks enclosing a water garden, was built. The two laboratory blocks frame a long view of the Pacific Ocean, accentuated by a thin linear fountain that seems to reach for the horizon.

The campus was designed by Louis Kahn. Salk had sought a beautiful campus in order to draw the best researchers in the world. The original buildings of the Salk Institute were designated a historical landmark in 1991. The entire 27-acre (11 ha) site was deemed eligible by the California Historical Resources Commission in 2006 for listing in the US National Register of Historic Places. It is "arguably the defining work" of Kahn.

=== Design ===
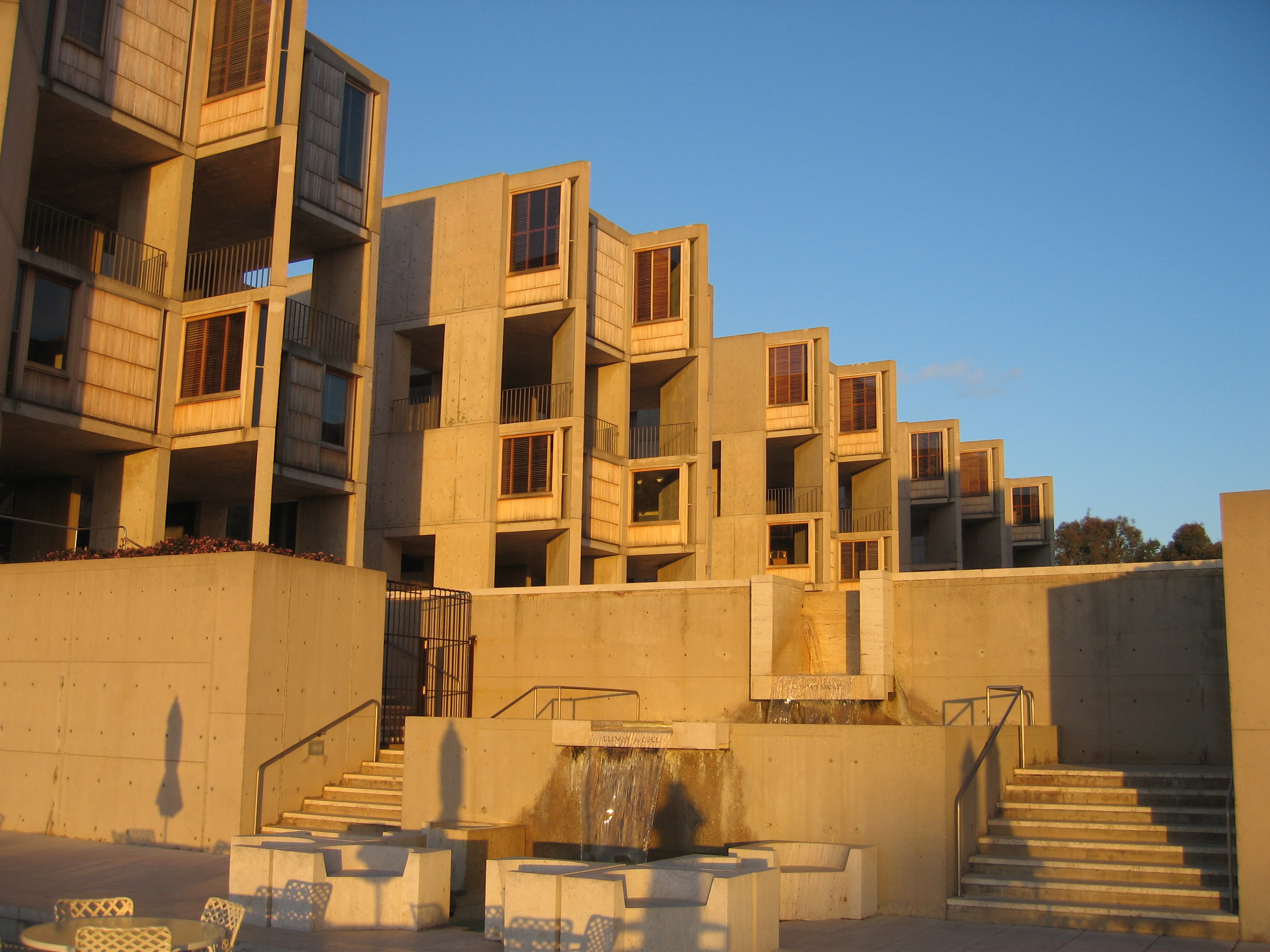
Water stream between symmetric building masses flowing towards the ocean

Jack MacAllister, FAIA, of the Kahn office, was the supervising architect and a design influence on the building that consists of two symmetric wings with a water stream flowing towards the ocean in the middle travertine-paved central plaza that separates the two. In the beginning the buildings were made up of different types of concrete mixes of different color. In the basement of the complex, there are different colored water walls because Kahn was experimenting with the mixtures. The buildings themselves have been designed to promote collaboration, and thus there are no walls separating laboratories on any of the floors. The lighting fixtures on the roof slide along rails thus reflecting the collaborative and open philosophy of the Salk Institute's science.

After two years of design work, and after the design had been approved and meetings with building contractors had begun, Kahn and the Salk Institute abruptly decided to reduce the number of laboratory buildings from four narrow ones to two wider ones and to increase the number of floors per building from two to three. August Komendant re-engineered the structure and produced a new set of drawings with a speed that professor Leslie described as "legendary". Komendant also trained the construction workers in techniques for producing a highly refined concrete finish.

In 1992 the American Institute of Architects (AIA) gave this building its prestigious Twenty-five Year Award, which is given to only one building per year.

Inside the laboratories, the ducts and vents are reinforced by concrete Vierendeel trusses supported by post-tensioned columns. The authorities at the time were very cautious due to the fact that they felt these trusses would not be able to hold in case of an earthquake, but in a tour de force of structural design, Komendant was able to achieve twice the ductility that a steel frame offered.

At first Kahn wanted to put a garden in the middle of the two buildings but, as construction continued, he did not know what shape it should take. When he saw an exhibit of Luis Barragan's work at the Museum of Modern Art in New York, Kahn invited Baragan to collaborate on the court that separated the two buildings. Barragan told Kahn that he should not add one leaf, nor plant, not one flower, nor dirt, instead, make it a plaza with a single water feature. The resulting space is considered the most impressive element of the entire design.

=== Courtyard ===
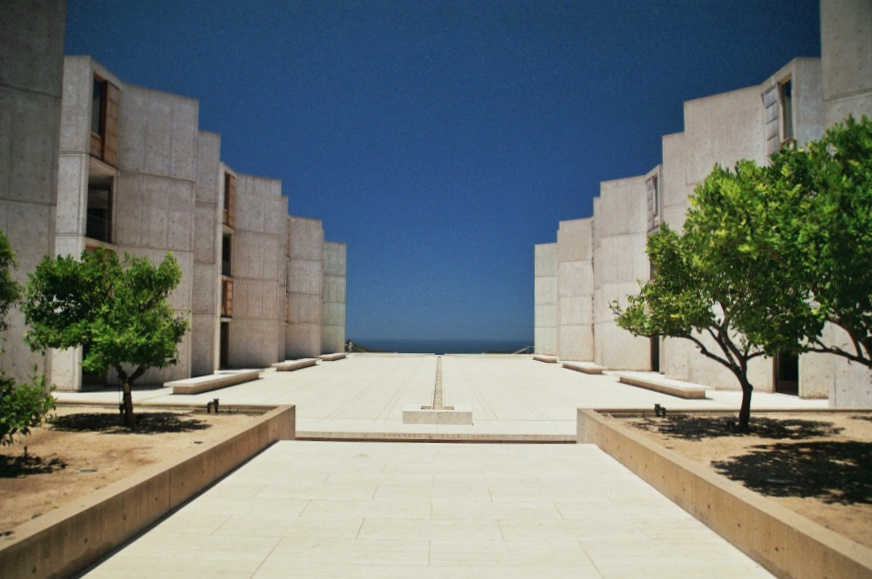
Semi-dwarf Valencia orange trees.

In the courtyard is a citrus grove containing several rows of semi-dwarf Valencia orange trees. This grove replaces the original grove which contained orange and kumquat trees which were then replaced with lime trees in the 1995 grove refurbishment. This latest replacement was due primarily to a need to remove current trees for structural repairs and waterproofing of central plant ceilings. The trees were mulched and used for ground cover in compliance with project commitments to sustainability. The decision not to replant additional lime trees stems from dissatisfaction with the manner in which the current trees defoliate and turn yellow in the shade. Valencia compensates for shade by producing additional chlorophyll in shaded section, becoming greener.

=== Open environment ===
The Salk Institute replete with empty space is symbolic of an open environment for creation. The contrast between balance and dynamic space manifests a pluralistic invitation for scientific study in structures developed to accommodate their respective functions as parts of a research facility. Although modern in appearance, it is essentially an isolated compound for individual and collaborative study, not unlike monasteries as sanctuaries for religious discovery, and they are thought to have directly influenced Kahn in his design. Ultimately, the Salk Institute's meaning can be interpreted as transcending function and physical place as a reflection of Western civilization's pursuit of truth through science.

In 2014, the Getty Conservation Institute partnered with the Salk Institute to preserve the concrete and teak building which is, due to its coastal location, subject to the punishing rigors of a marine environment.

=== Laboratories, library ===
Most of the laboratories and studies are named after the benefactors, such as the Sloan-Swartz Center for Theoretical Neurobiology and the Razavi Newman Center for Bioinformatics. A library that houses current periodicals, some books and computers is located on the 3rd level of the west end of the North building. The Conrad T. Prebys auditorium and the Trustees' Room are located in the basement of the east buildings of the institute.

=== Concrete ===
According to A. Perez, the concrete was made with volcanic ash relying on the basis of ancient Roman concrete making techniques, and as a result gives off a warm, pinkish glow. This "pozzolanic" concrete was then only vibrated as needed structurally, leaving a lightly textured wall face. The basement also houses the transgenic core. Each laboratory block has five study towers, with each tower containing four offices, except for those near the entrance to the court, which only contain two. A diagonal wall allows each of the thirty-six scientists using the studies to have a view of the Pacific, and every study is fitted with a combination of operable sliding and fixed glass panels in teak wood frames. Originally the design also included living quarters and a conference building, but they were never built.

=== Structural system ===
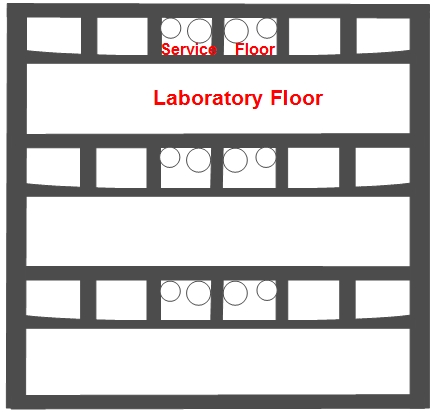
A section of a laboratory building at the Salk Institute. Above each laboratory floor is a service floor to handle air ducts, piping, etc. The ladder-like structures that encase the service floors are Vierendeel trusses.

In keeping with his design and the philosophy of "served and servant spaces," (Note: "Served and servant spaces: Servant spaces are supporting the main areas of the building. Toilets, storage and technical rooms, stairs and corridors, duct shaft and kitchens are main examples of spaces that are considered as servant spaces. Servant spaces are not meant for habitation, they will be visited only briefly or by internal staff. They are mostly meant for mechanical equipment, ducts and pipes. Served spaces are the primary areas. Concert halls, commercial spaces, living rooms, bedrooms, auditoriums, classes and exhibition spaces are common examples of served spaces. Served spaces are meant for habitation and are meant for primary occupants of the space or visitors. " and the need for mechanical services (air ducts, pipes, etc.)") and as the vast requirement for mechanical spaces were extensive, Kahn decided to create a separate service floor for them above each of the laboratories to make it easier to reconfigure individual laboratories in the future without disrupting neighboring spaces. He also designed each laboratory floor to be entirely free of internal support columns, making laboratory configuration easier. Komendant engineered the Vierendeel trusses that make this arrangement possible. These pre-stressed concrete trusses are about 62 feet (19 m) long, spanning the full width of each floor and extending from the bottom of each service floor to the top. They are supported by steel cables embedded in the concrete in a curve similar to that of cables supporting a suspension bridge. Their rectangular openings, which are 6 feet (1.8 m) high in the center and 5 feet (1.5 m) at the ends, allow maintenance workers to move easily through the thicket of pipes and ducts on the service floors. The trusses impose strictly vertical loads on their support columns, to which they are attached not rigidly but with a system of slip plates and tension cables to permit small movements during moderate earthquakes.

=== Unbuilt areas ===
The meeting and conference areas and the living quarters were formally designated by Kahn as the Meeting Place and Living Place, respectively. He continued to make drawings of these spaces even after their cancellation following a shortage in construction funding. Kahn's stressed importance of the Meeting Place and Living Place to the entirety of the campus plan was in accordance to the Urban Reidentification Grid concepts proposed by British architects Peter and Alison Smithson nearly a decade before, in which interconnectivity between communal activities and their respective spaces took priority. Aesthetically, the unbuilt areas combined cuboidal and cylindrical forms, distinguishing them from the laboratory cluster. The U-shaped road that was part of the original plan was built and exists to this day, but its ends that would have connected the Meeting Place and Living Place to the central laboratories are left bare or occupied by a parking lot.

== Scientific activities ==
The institute is organized into several research units, each of which is further composed of several scientific groups, each led by a member of the faculty. Some of these units are:

- Plant Molecular and Cellular Biology Laboratory
- Regulatory Biology Laboratory
- Structural Biology Laboratory
- Gene Expression Laboratory
- Laboratory of Genetics
- Molecular Neurobiology Laboratory
- Cellular Neurobiology Laboratory
- Systems Neurobiology Laboratories
- Computational Neurobiology Laboratory
- Clayton Foundation Laboratories for Peptide Biology
- Molecular and Cell Biology Laboratory
- Chemical Biology and Proteomics Laboratory
- Immunobiology and Microbial Pathogenesis Laboratory
- The Renato Dulbecco Laboratories for Cancer Research

Rusty Gage was named to a five-year term to lead the institute on January 1, 2019. In February 2023 he returned to full-time laboratory work and was succeeded as president by Gerald Joyce. The Austrian molecular biologist Jan Karlseder is the chair of the academic council. There are 53 faculty members. Five of these are members of the Howard Hughes Medical Institute, and more than a quarter are elected members of the US National Academy of Sciences.

In terms of research output measured by number of publications and citations, the institute is recognized as one of the world's leading institutions in several areas of biology, especially in neurosciences and plant biology.

In December 2009, the Time magazine ranked Joseph R. Ecker's mapping of the human epigenome as the second biggest scientific achievement of 2009.

In May 2008, the California state government announced that it would provide $US270 million for funding California Institute for Regenerative Medicine (CIRM). The Sanford Consortium for Regenerative Medicine, a joint effort between Salk Institute, UC San Diego, Burnham Institute and TSRI, received US$43 million from this funding.

In addition, the institute employs postdoctoral scholars and staff scientists who receive training for academic leadership.

== Notable projects ==
Salk Institute currently runs the Harnessing Plants Initiative (HPI), which aims to improve the capability of agricultural crops to sequester carbon. It comprises two programs:

- CRoPS (CO_{2} Removal on a Planetary Scale) which aims to develop "Salk Ideal Plants"
- CPR (Coastal Plant Restoration)

The Salk Ideal Plants are plants that are genetically modified. The intent is to create plants with increased root mass, root depth and suberin content.

== Training program ==
Although the Salk Institute is not a degree-granting institution, it runs a graduate program together with the neighboring UC San Diego, and all Salk Institute professors receive adjunct appointments in the Division of Biological Sciences at UC San Diego. In addition, several faculty members are affiliated with other programs such as the Neuroscience Graduate Program and the Cellular and Molecular Medicine. The students pursue either a PhD or an MD/PhD degree.

== Notable faculty members ==
- Joanne Chory, renowned plant scientist, member of the National Academy of Sciences and Howard Hughes Medical Institute investigator.
- Ursula Bellugi, founder of the neurobiology of American Sign Language
- Joseph Ecker, plant geneticist and biologist, renowned expert on epigenetics in plant and animals, member of the National Academy of Sciences, Howard Hughes Medical Institute investigator.
- Terrence Sejnowski, renowned computational neuroscientist, Howard Hughes Medical Institute investigator.
- Ronald M. Evans, winner of the Lasker Award, March of Dimes Chair in Molecular and Developmental Biology.
- Fred H. Gage, highly cited neuroscientist.
- Tony Hunter, discoverer of tyrosine phosphorylation of proteins.
- Juan Carlos Izpisua Belmonte, prominent developmental biologist.
- Katherine Jones, expert in proteomics who discovered the proteins required for HIV gene expression
- Charles F. Stevens, neuroscientist known for work in exploring the scalable architecture of the brain. Member of the National Academy of Sciences and former Howard Hughes Medical Investigator.
- Reuben Shaw, cancer researcher and director of Salk's National Cancer Institute-Designated Cancer Center.

== Nobel laureates ==
As of 2026, the institute has one Nobel laureate on its faculty: Elizabeth Blackburn. Five of Salk's 11 Nobel laureates were deceased by 2026: Francis Crick, Robert W. Holley, Renato Dulbecco, Sydney Brenner, Roger Guillemin. Another five scientists trained at Salk have gone on to win the Nobel Prize.

=== Former members ===
- Stephen Heinemann (1939–2014), early neuroscientist
- Francis Crick (deceased), Nobel laureate (for DNA double helix structure description).
- Leslie Orgel (deceased), former senior fellow and research professor
- Marguerite Vogt (deceased), virologist.
- Leo Szilard (deceased), Nuclear physicist, invented radioactive cobalt cancer treatment.
- Renato Dulbecco (deceased), Nobel laureate (for viral transformation of cells).
- Melvin Cohn (deceased), co-founder, pioneer in the research of gene regulation
- Elizabeth Blackburn (former president of Salk Institute), Nobel laureate (for work on telomeres and telomerase with Carol Greider and Jack Szostak).
- Sydney Brenner (deceased), Nobel laureate (for work with Caenorhabditis elegans)
- Roger Guillemin, co-founder, Nobel laureate (for elucidating the structures of neurohormones TRH and GnRH)
- Inder Verma, cancer biologist, Editor-in-chief of PNAS journal.

== Gallery ==
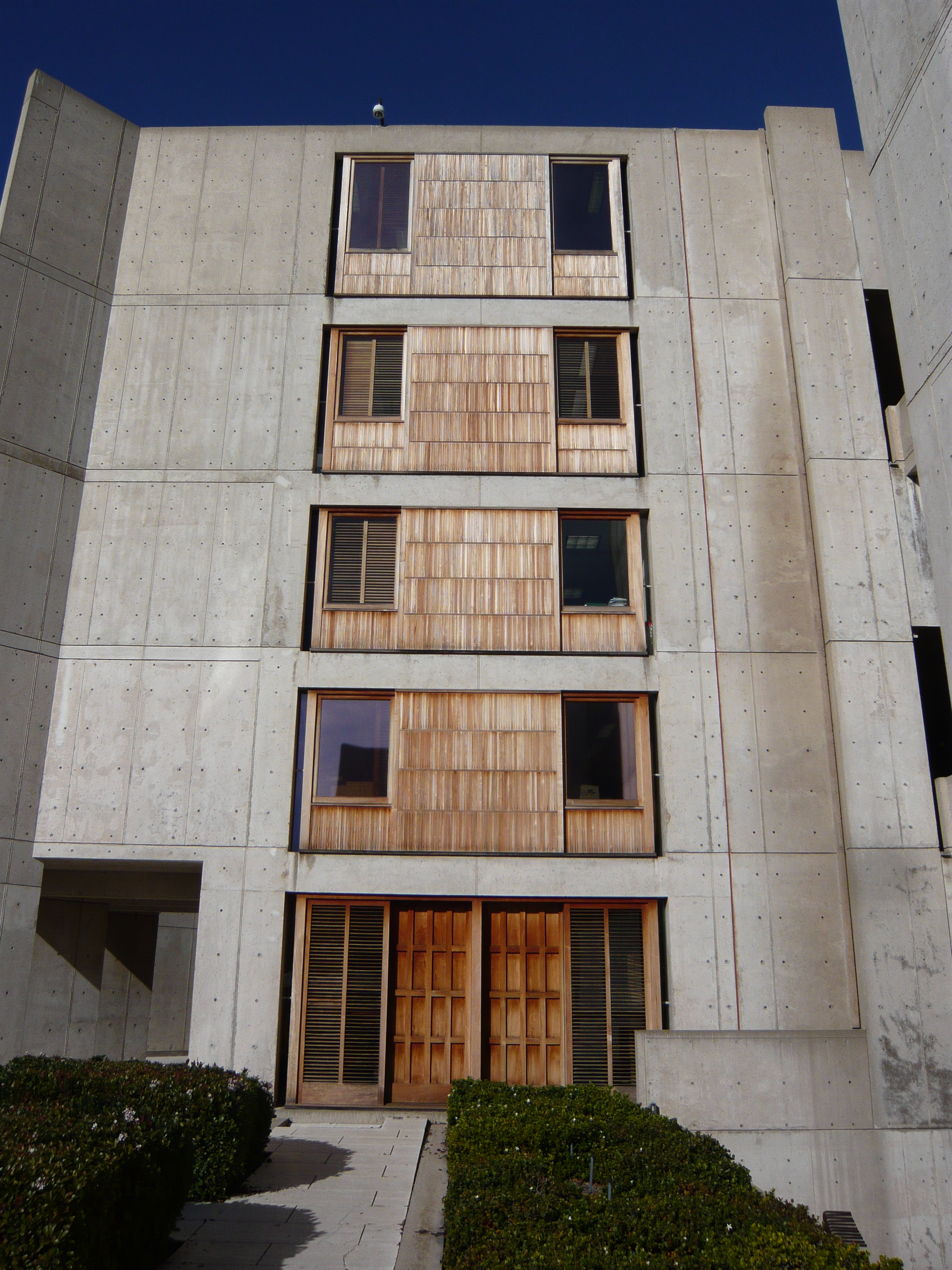

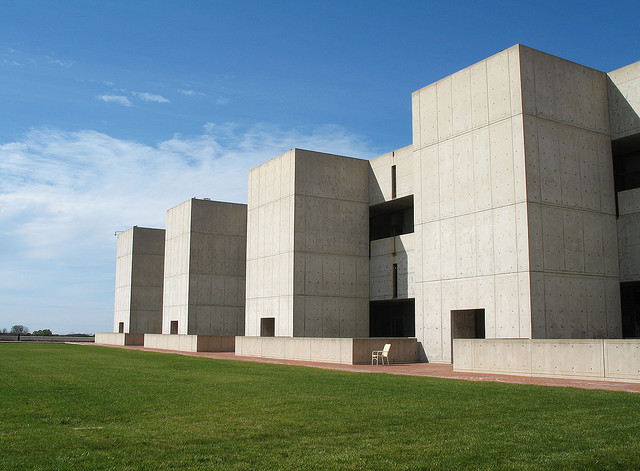

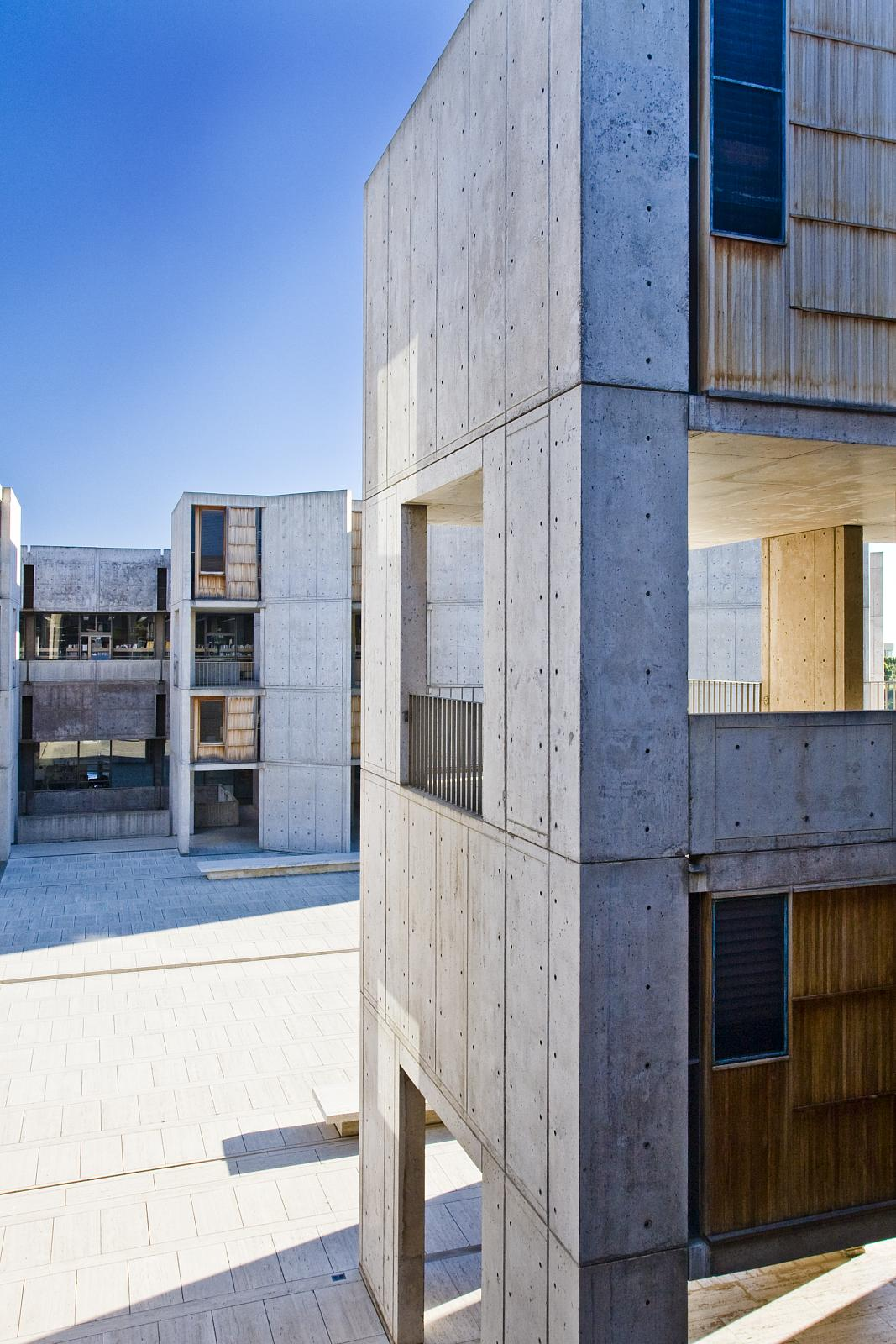

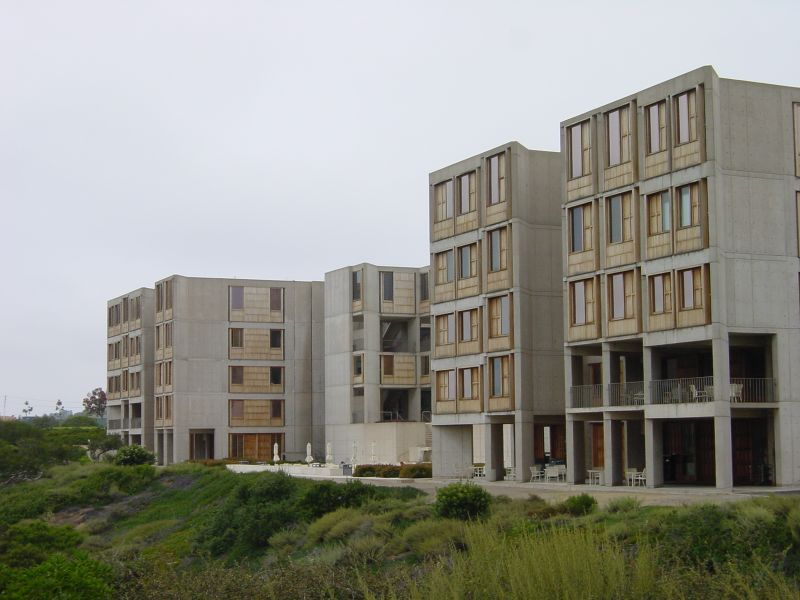

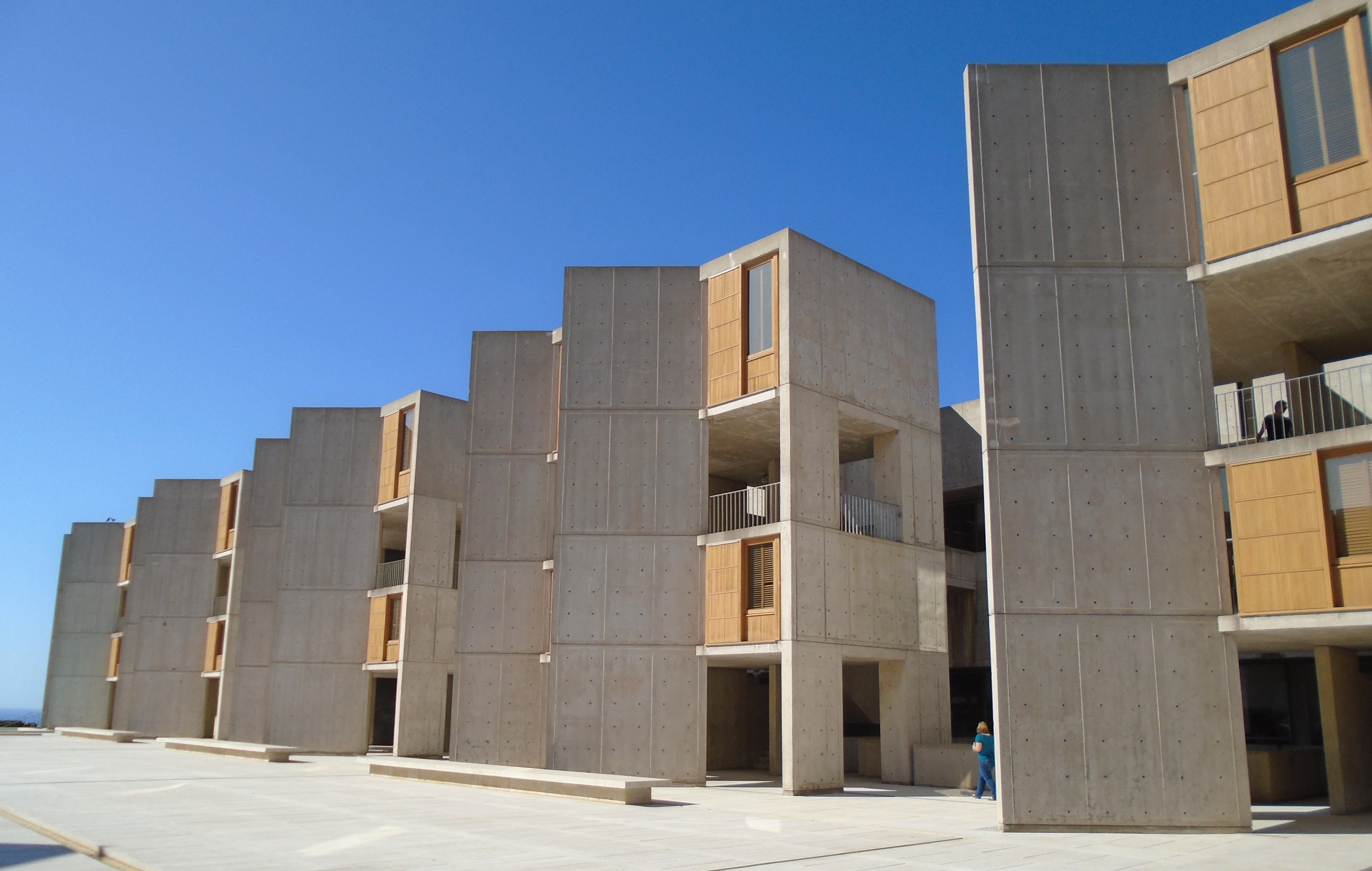

== See also ==
- Broad Institute
- Cold Spring Harbor Laboratory
- Laboratory Life, a book exploring the scientific construction of fact based on fieldwork done at Roger Guillemin's lab at the Salk Institute
- San Diego Historical Landmarks in La Jolla, California
- University of California, San Diego
- Whitehead Institute

== Bibliography ==
- Leslie, Thomas (2005). Louis I. Kahn: Building Art, Building Science. New York: George Braziller, Incorporated. ISBN 0-8076-1543-9, 0-8076-1543-9
- Weston, Richard (2004). Key buildings of the twentieth century: plans, sections, and elevations. New York: W.W. Norton. p. 138. ISBN 978-0-393-73145-3
- Wiseman, Carter. Louis I. Kahn: Beyond Time and Style. New York: W. W. Norton & Company, 2007. ISBN 978-0393731651
