= Sanford Burnham Prebys =

Non-profit medical research institute

Coordinates: 32.901192°N 117.241937°W

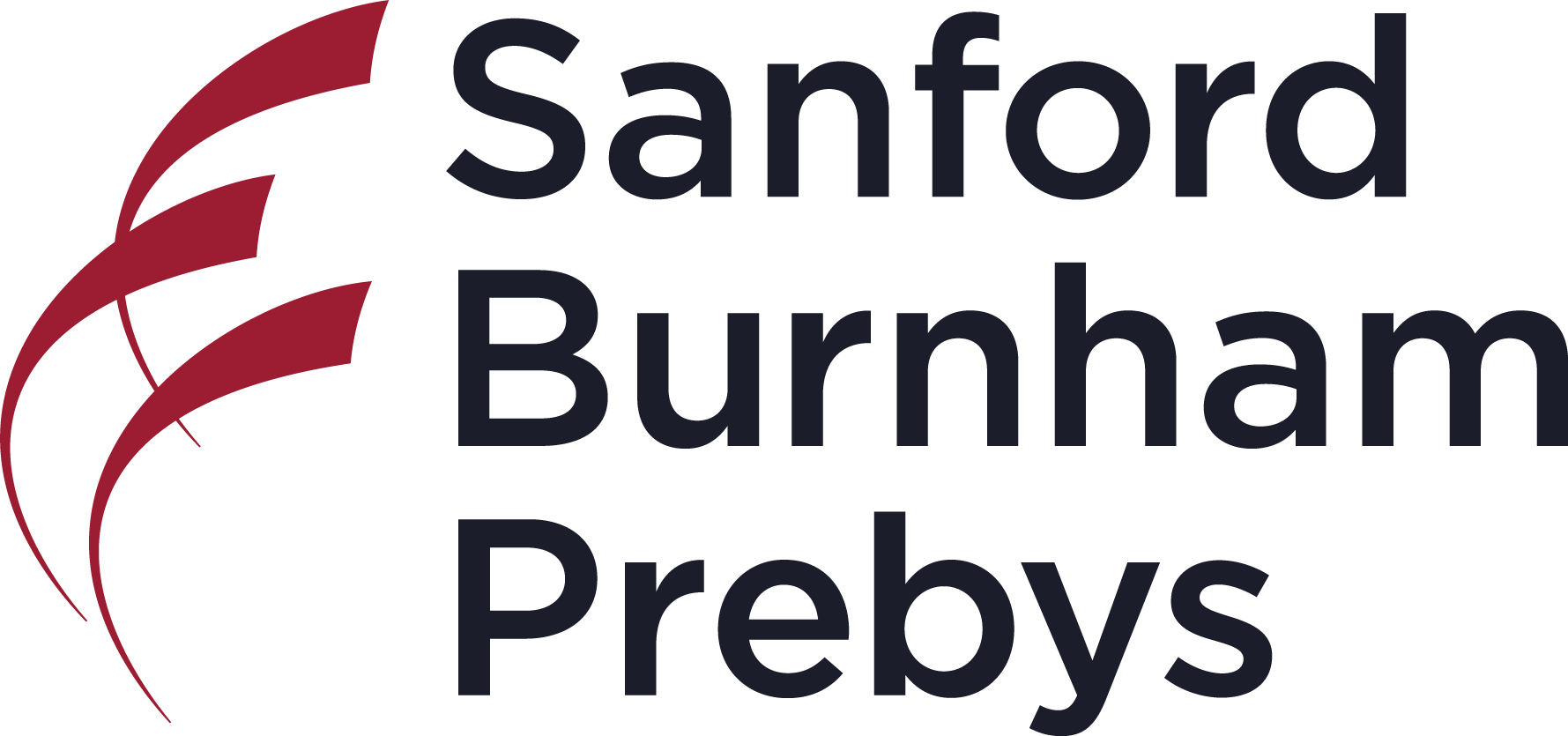
- Official logo of Sanford Burnham Prebys
- Established: 1976
- President and CEO: David Brenner, M.D.
- Budget: $109 million (FY2021)
- Address: 10901 North Torrey Pines Road
- Location: La Jolla, California
- Website: sbpdiscovery.org

Sanford Burnham Prebys is an American nonprofit biomedical research institute located in La Jolla, California, conducting biomedical and translational research, including stem cell and drug discovery studies. It operates a National Cancer Institute-designated Cancer Center and conducts genomics research.

== History ==
Former logo of Burnham Institute for Medical Research

In 1976, Dr. William H. Fishman and his wife, Lillian Waterman Fishman, founded the La Jolla Cancer Research Foundation after Dr. William retired from Tufts University School of Medicine. In 1996, the Institute was renamed to the Burnham Institute after receiving a $10 million donation from Malin Burnham and another anonymous donor. In 2006, its name was changed to the Burnham Institute for Medical Research. In 2007, T. Denny Sanford pledged $20 million through Sanford Health to support the Sanford Children's Health Research Center in La Jolla, California, and Sioux Falls, South Dakota.

In 2008, a $97.9 million grant from the National Institutes of Health enabled the foundation of a small-molecule screening center.

In 2010, following a $50 million donation from Sanford, the Institute was renamed Sanford-Burnham Medical Research Institute. Additionally, in 2014, a $275 million pledge was announced but was later reduced to $200 million. In 2015, a $100 million gift from Conrad Prebys resulted in the renaming of the Institute to Sanford Burnham Prebys.

In 2022, Dr. David Brenner was nominated as the Institute's President and CEO.

== Funding ==
According to Sanford Burnham Prebys tax filings, for its fiscal year ending June 2024, the non-profit reported $123 million in annual revenue, with $111 million in expenses, $12 million in net income and $268 million in net assets.

The sources of revenue were: 86.8% from grants and contributions, 0.5% from program services, 5.5% from investment income, 1.2% for royalties, 0.3% from rental property income, 4,7% from sales of assets with another 1.0% from "other revenue".

Donations from the Whittaker Corporation and the California Foundation enabled the acquisition of a five-acre site on the La Jolla mesa. These donations, alongside those from the Institute's namesakes (T. Denny Sanford, Malin and Roberta Burnham, and Conrad Prebys), supported the Institute’s expansion.

== Research ==
As of June 2024, Sanford Burnham Prebys employed 45 Principal Investigators and a total of 500 staff members, consisting of postdoctoral researchers, graduate students and administrative personnel. The Institute also partnered with the San Diego Nathan Shock Center for Aging Research alongside the Salk Institute and UC San Diego.

Stem cell research

Sanford Burnham Prebys participates in a collaborative stem cell research initiative with several other California-based institutions. The Sanford Consortium for Regenerative Medicine, named after T. Denny Sanford, was created to advance studies in stem cell science and regenerative medicine. Construction of a dedicated research facility in La Jolla began in 2009 following state budget delays that temporarily affected project funding.

Nanomedicine

The Institute also maintains research activities in nanomedicine through a partnership with the University of California, Santa Barbara. This collaboration began in 2006 and was later expanded with the creation of the Center for Nanomedicine, led by Dr. Jamey Marth. The center combines expertise in biomedical science and engineering to study nanoscale biological systems, including research on nanoparticle-based methods for delivering treatments directly to specific cells or tissues.

== Educational programs ==
A robotic arm used in high-throughput screening is fully operational at the La Jolla campus

Sanford Burnham Prebys operates an accredited Graduate School of Biomedical Sciences, established in 2005, offering a PhD degree in Biomedical Sciences. In 2015, Sanford Burnham Prebys achieved accreditation with the Western Association of Schools and Colleges. Moreover, the Institute also trains and employs postdoctoral fellows, with an average of 250 postdoctoral fellows trained there at any one time.

The graduate school focuses on biomedical research and is supported by laboratory technologies used in biomedical research. The program offers a foundation in biomedical science and projects in biology, chemistry, bioinformatics, and engineering, where students complete research projects within specialized laboratories.

== Select scientific achievements ==
The Institute initially focused on the commonalities between cancer and fetal development, known as oncodevelopmental biology. Early research included the development of monoclonal antibody-based 'two-site' ELISA. In the 1980s, the Institute conducted research on fibronectin and other extracellular matrix components, including research into cell adhesion. This work includes the discovery of the RGD tripeptide as the cell attachment site in fibronectin, fibrinogen, and other adhesive proteins, alongside the discovery of integrins, which are the cell surface receptors that recognize the RGD sequence in matrix proteins.

In the 1990s, Institute scientists contributed to research on programmed cell death, discovering several previously unknown pro- and anti-apoptotic proteins, namely caspases, inhibitor of apoptosis (IAP) proteins, and Bcl-2 family members.

The demonstration by Institute scientists that cells deprived of attachment to an extracellular matrix undergo apoptosis ("anoikis") connected the fields of cell adhesion and apoptosis. These discoveries have been cited as contributing to research, as they explain why normal cells remain in their appropriate place, while cancer cells spread and metastasize. Reduced integrin function in malignant cells enables them to leave their original tissue, and increased expression of anti-apoptotic proteins prevents anoikis, enabling cancer invasion and metastasis. Research based on these findings has informed the development of several drug candidates.

In recent years, the Institute has expanded its research focus to include neuroscience, cardiovascular diseases, and rare diseases of sugar and phosphate metabolism. Additionally, discoveries of proteins linked to disease development and the identification of chemical compounds (or antibodies) that bind to those proteins and inhibit/enhance their function are an area of active research. Such compounds become candidate drugs for disease treatment. Several compounds developed either at the Institute or different biopharmaceutical companies are currently undergoing clinical trials. The Institute's studies demonstrated that simple sugars, including D-mannose, L-fucose, and D-galactose, can effectively treat a set of rare genetic disorders; indeed, some are now in clinical trials.

== Collaboration and partnerships ==
Sanford Burnham Prebys has established working relationships with the University of California, San Diego, The Scripps Research Institute, the Salk Institute for Biological Studies, Duke University's Sarah W. Stedman Nutrition and Metabolism Center, and the Mayo Clinic.

Sanford Burnham Prebys also collaborates with the pharmaceutical industry to support the translation of basic research into clinical applications.
