= Katherine Jones (academic) =

Biochemist

Katherine A. Jones
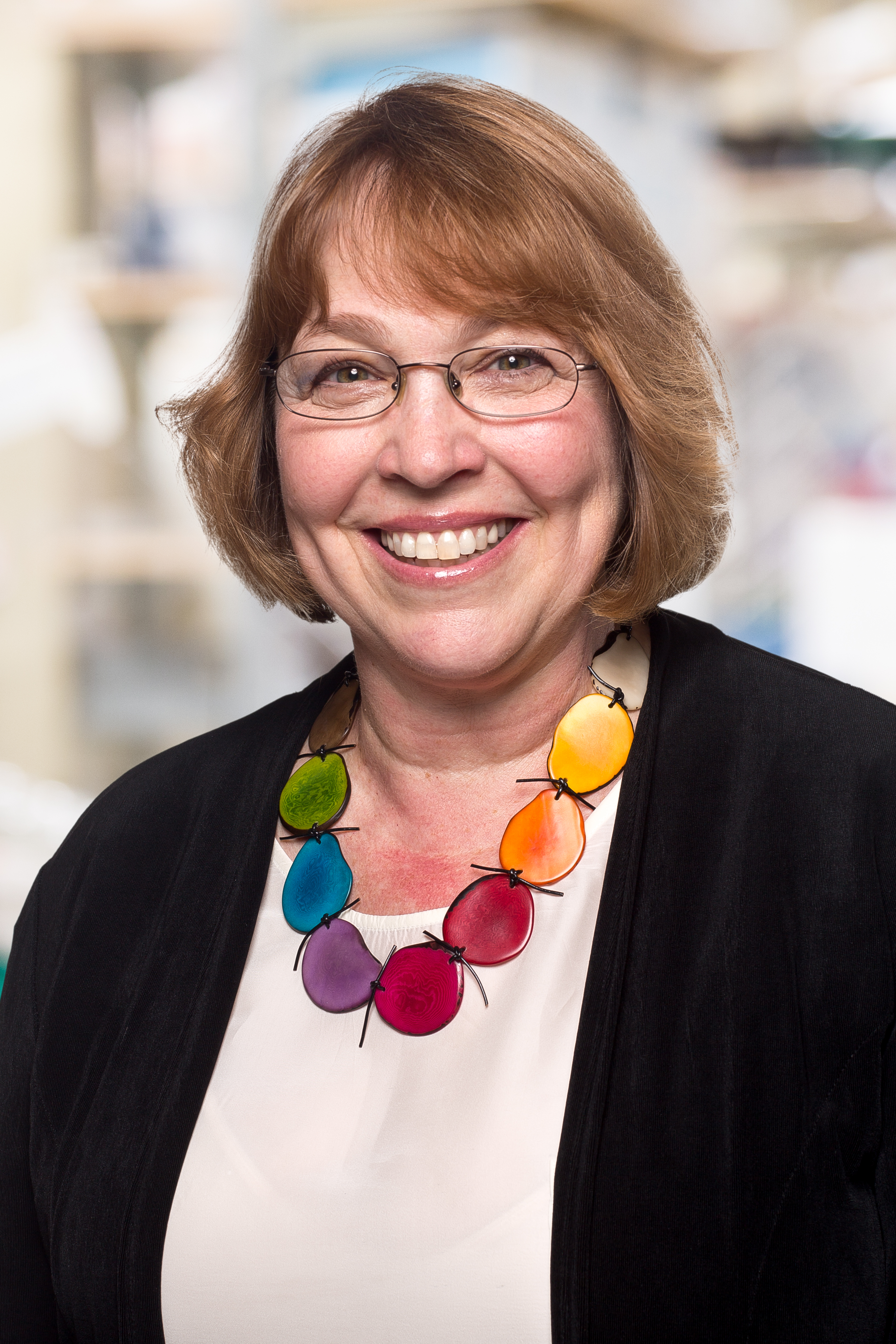
- Education: University of California, Riverside
- Known for: HIV, stem cell biology, proteomics
- Scientific career
- Workplaces: Salk Institute for Biological Studies

Katherine A. Jones is a professor of regulatory biology and the Edwin K. Hunter Chair at the Salk Institute for Biological Studies. She uses proteomics to study transcription elongation and molecular biology to understand protein coordination. Jones identified elongation factors, a class of proteins which are important in viral gene expression.

== Early life and education ==
Jones earned her PhD in biochemistry at the University of California, Riverside. She was made a Pew Scholar in 1987. Her Pew Foundation fellowship allowed her to study the transcription mechanisms that are responsible for rapid induction in mammalian genes. Jones showed how the RNA polymerase II transcription factor Sp1 binds to DNA and activates RNA.

== Research and career ==
Jones is a professor of regulatory biology and Edwin K. Hunter Chair at the Salk Institute for Biological Studies. Jones holds an adjunct position at University of California, San Diego. She has worked extensively on understanding the Human Immunodeficiency Virus (HIV). She investigated several proteins that interact with HIV-Tat (Tat). Tat is a protein created by HIV, which has been described as an "engine for HIV replication". Jones identified several proteins (including Cyclin T1, CycT1, and SSu72) that are required for HIV gene expression. SSu72 is a phosphatase that binds to Tat and speeds up the transcription process that replicates the virus. Unfortunately, CycT1 is needed for normal cell function, so is not an ideal target for antivirals.

Jones looks to create small molecule inhibitors that restrict these proteins. She identified that the small molecule JIB-04 is particularly effective in destroying Tat. She used DIFFpop to identify the protein targets of JIB-04. DIFFpop revealed that JIB-04 decreases the levels of Tat because it binds together two enzymes in the host cell, SHMT2 and BRCC36, which subsequently enable the cells to destroy Tat. At present JIB-04 is too toxic to primary T-cells, but Jones and colleagues are working on investigations of other small molecules that can still inhibit Tat expression.

Jones demonstrated that in colon cancer, the mutated adenomatous polyposis coli (APC) regulates the expression of genes which control cancer growth. She demonstrated that APC cannot turn off growth control genes as it cannot bind to a protein that presents metastasis. She has gone on to show that transcription elongation is involved with the differentiation of stem cells. It is well known that wnt and activin pathways are needed for stem cell growth, but it was unclear how they work together. Jones showed how they work together to activate transcription. She also demonstrated that activation of the wnt signaling pathway can result in colon cancer. During their investigations of embryonic stem cells, Jones identified a third pathway, YAP, which slows the activin pathway and stops stem cells from specialising. She used CRISPR-cas9 to remove the genes that make the YAP protein, reducing the number of steps to convert embryonic stem cells into functional heart cells.

She has also studied the CDK12 gene, which is mutated in 3 - 5% of prostate, ovarian and breast cancers. The majority of cancers that contain a mutated CDK12 gene are not responsive to immunotherapy, so creating inhibitors of CDK12 could make cancers more treatable. When CDK12 is inhibited cells cannot repair DNA and the cells are more likely to die during chemotherapy.

In 2017 Jones filed a lawsuit against the Salk Institute for Biological Studies for gender discrimination, citing that their work had not been recognised their labs were small and they received less funding. She claimed that imagery of women faculty members was used in Salk Institute promotional material to secure funding from donors. Jones settled her case in August 2018.
