= William H. Fishman =

Canadian-American cancer researcher

- Born: March 2, 1914; Winnipeg, Manitoba, Canada
- Died: January 25, 2001 (aged 86); La Jolla, California, United States
- Education: Minnedosa Collegiate (1931), University of Saskatchewan (BSc, 1935), University of Toronto (PhD, 1939)
- Scientific career
- Fields: Biochemistry, oncology
- Institutions: University of Edinburgh, Weill Cornell Medicine, Wake Forest School of Medicine, University of Chicago, Tufts University

William Harold Fishman (March 2, 1914 – January 25, 2001) was a Canadian-American cancer researcher who taught at Tufts University from 1948 until his retirement in 1975. In 1971 he founded the Tufts Cancer Research Center, the first of its kind in the area under President Nixon's 1971 National Cancer Act. In 1976, with a $180,000 grant from the National Cancer Institute, he co-founded the La Jolla Cancer Research Foundation (since renamed the Sanford Burnham Prebys Medical Discovery Institute) with his wife, Lillian. He was also the founding editor-in-chief of Tumor Biology, serving in this role from 1980 to 1983.
