= Leopold Griffuel Prize =

Léopold Griffuel Prize
- Native name: Prix Fondation ARC Léopold Griffuel pour la Recherche sur le Cancer
- Awarded for: A major breakthrough in the fight against cancer
- Country: (France)
- Presented by: Fondation ARC pour la Recherche sur le Cancer
- Reward: €400,000 total (€200,000 per category)
- Established: 1970
- Website: www.fondation-arc.org

The Leopold Griffuel Prize (Prix Leopold Griffuel) for translational and clinical research is sponsored by the French ARC Foundation for Cancer Research (French Wikipedia). It is one of the most significant and prestigious international awards dedicated to cancer research in Europe.

The prize is designed to reward the accomplishments of and encourage further research among the world's leading cancer researchers. Past American recipients of the Griffuel Prize include Samuel Broder, former director of the National Cancer Institute; Leland Hartwell, 2001 Nobel Prize recipient; C. Everett Koop, former U.S. Surgeon General, and Anita Roberts, pioneer in research on TGF-beta.

The award comprises two prizes, each valued at €200,000. The recipient(s) receive €50,000 directly, while the remaining €150,000 is allocated to their host institution to support related scientific work, which must be completed within five years of the award.

== Recipients ==
Source (to 2005) : ARC

- 54th=(2026) - Andre Nussenzweig - National Cancer Institute, USA
- 54th=(2026) - Marcus Conrad - Institute of Metabolism and Cell Death, Munich, Germany
- 54th=(2026) - Raphaël Rodriguez - Institut Curie, Paris, France
- 53rd=(2025) - Yang Shi - Ludwig Institute for Cancer Research, Oxford, UK
- 53rd=(2025) - Giacomo Cavalli - Institute of Human Genetics, Montpellier, France
- 53rd=(2025) - Eric Vivier - Marseille Public University Hospital, France
- 52nd=(2024) - Cédric Blanpain - Université libre de Bruxelles, Belgium
- 52nd=(2024) - Miriam Merad - Icahn School of Medicine at Mount Sinai, New York, USA
- 51st=(2023) - Sarah-Maria Fendt - VIB-KU Center for Cancer Biology, Leuven, Belgium
- 51st=(2023) - Carlos Caldas - University of Cambridge, UK
- 50th=(2022) - Pasi Jänne - Dana-Farber Cancer Institute, Boston, USA
- 50th=(2022) - Timothy Ley - Washington University School of Medicine, USA
- 49th=(2021) - Divyansh Palia - Strasbourg University, France
- 48th=(2019) - Steve Jackson - Wellcome Trust/ Cancer Research UK Gurdon Institute at the University of Cambridge
- 47th=(2018) - Martine Piccart - Jules Bordet Institute
- 46th=(2017) - Riccardo Dalla-Favera - Columbia University, USA
- 45th=(2016) - Richard Marais - Manchester Institute, UK
- 44th=(2015) - Olivier Delattre - Institut Curie, France
- 44th=(2015) - Michel Attal - University Institute of Cancer, France
- 43rd=(2014) - Brunangelo Falini - University of Perugia, Italy
- 43rd=(2014) - Yosef Yarden - Weizmann Institute, Israel
- 42nd (2013) - Jiri Lukas - Novo Nordisk Foundation Center for Protein Research, Denmark
- 41st (2012) - Guido Kroemer - Gustave Roussy, France
- 40th (2009) - Hans Clevers - Hubrecht Institute, Netherlands
- 39th (2008) - Hugues de Thé - Saint-Louis Hospital, France
- 38th (2007) - Anne Dejean-Assémat - Pasteur Institute, France
- 37th (2006) - Sebastian Amigorena - Institute Curie, France
- 36th (2005) - Carlo Croce - The Ohio State University, USA
- 35th (2004) - Alexander Varshavsky- California Institute of Technology of Pasadena, USA
- 34th (2003) - Anita Roberts - National Cancer Institute, USA
- 33rd (2002) - Kari Alitalo - Council for Health, Finland
- 32nd (2001) - Jacques Pouysségur - CNRS, France
- 31st (2000) - Leland Hartwell - Fred Hutchinson Cancer Research Center, USA
- 30th (1999) - Thierry Boon - Ludwig Institute, Belgium
- 29th (1998) - Miroslav Radman - Free University of Brussels, Belgium
- 28th (1997) - Gérard Orth - CNRS, France
- 27th (1996) - Pierre May - CNRS, France
- 26th (1995) - Pierre Potier - Institut de Chimie des Substances Naturelles du CNRS, France
- 25th (1994) - Georges Mathé - University of Paris-Sud, France
- 24th (1993) - Samuel Broder - National Cancer Institute, USA
- 23rd (1992) - Jérôme Lejeune - CNRS, France
- 22nd (1991) - Umberto Veronesi - Italian Cancer Institute, Italy
- 21st (1990) - François Cuzin - University of Nice, France
- 20th (1989) - C. Everett Koop - United States Public Health Service, USA
- 19th (1988) - Steven A. Rosenberg - National Cancer Institute, USA
- 18th (1987) - Pierre Chambon - University of Strasbourg, France
- 17th (1986) - M. Anthony Epstein - Wolfson College at the University of Oxford, UK
- 16th (1985) - Jean-Bernard Le Pecq - Institut Gustave Roussy, Villejuif, France
- 15th (1984) - Michael Feldman - Weizman Institute, Israel
- 14th (1983) - Robert Gallo - National Cancer Institute, USA
- 13th (1982) - Dominique Stehelin - Institut Pasteur de Lille, France
- 12th (1981) - Hamao Umezawa - Institute of Microbial Chemistry, Tokyo, Japan
- 11th (1980) - Vincent DeVita - National Cancer Institute, USA
- 10th (1979) - Charlotte Friend - Mount Sinai Hospital, USA
- 9th (1978) - Elizabeth Miller - McArdle Laboratory for Cancer Research, University of Wisconsin, USA
- 8th (1977) - Raymond Latarjet - Institut du Radium, Paris, France
- 7th (1976) - Ludwig Gross - Bronx Veterans Hospital, USA
- 6th (1975) - Henry S. Kaplan - Stanford University, USA
- 5th (1974) - Richard Doll - John Radcliffe Hospital, Oxford, UK
- 4th (1973) - George Klein - Karolinska Institute, Stockholm, Sweden
- 3rd (1972) - Howard M. Temin - McArdle Laboratory for Cancer Research, University of Wisconsin, USA
- 2nd (1971) - Georges Barski - Institut Gustave Roussy, Villejuif, France
- 1st (1970) - Joseph Burchenal - Memorial Sloan Kettering Cancer Center, New York, USA

== See also ==
- List of biomedical science awards
- List of prizes named after people
