= JacSue Kehoe =

American neuroscientist (1935–2019)

- Born: October 23, 1935; Cleveland, Ohio, U.S.
- Died: June 25, 2019 (aged 83)
- Education: Northwestern University (BA, 1957); Brown University (PhD, 1961)
- Occupation(s): Instructor at Brown University, researcher at CRNS
- Awards: Forbes Lectureship, 1977

JacSue Kehoe (October 23, 1935 – June 25, 2019) was an American neuroscientist and neuroscience researcher. She spent decades working with the neurons of Aplysia californica, studying post-synaptic nerve response. She discovered that one neurotransmitter can have multiple types of receptors, which could vary in level and type of response. Kehoe worked for the Centre national de la recherche scientifique, where she made many other discoveries in neuroscience.

== Early life ==
JacSue Kehoe was born on October 23, 1935, in Cleveland, Ohio. Her mother was a former doctoral candidate turned English teacher. Her father was an employee of the Chrysler Corporation. The youngest of three, Kehoe and her family moved to Evansville, Indiana, for the duration of World War II for her father's work. After the war they migrated back to the city, where Kehoe discovered her interest in the performing arts. She became assistant to the dramatic arts teacher at her high school: this position inspired her to become a theater director. She attended Northwestern University to pursue a degree in theater.

After two years pursuing her theater degree, she switched her major to experimental psychology. Human behavior was a major interest of the field. Kehoe performed experiments testing memory for her honor's thesis. After two years she graduated Northwestern with a bachelor's degree in experimental psychology.

Kehoe continued her education at Brown University. She focused on the function of the nervous system and its relation to psychology, furthering her understanding of human memory. She performed experiments concerning the proactive and retroactive inhibition of memory retention on pigeons, earning her Ph.D. in 1961.

== Career ==
Kehoe joined the psychology faculty of Brown University, before moving to Washington, D.C., to continue her research. As a postdoctoral fellow at the Walter Reed Army Institute of Research she furthered her study of discrimination learning in pigeons, rats and squirrels and became increasingly focused on the physiological basis of behavior. In a nearby lab Felix Strumwasser was using neurons from Aplysia californica, a species of sea slug, to study circadian rhythms. These cells were ideal for studying the effects of neurotransmitters on neuron behavior: using discarded Aplysia ganglia and equipment provided by Strumwasser's lab, Kehoe began her study of synaptic physiology.

In 1964 Kehoe moved to Paris to continue her work on Aplysia at the Institut Marey. She began experimenting to identify the neurotransmitter that brought about postsynaptic potentials (PSP). Attempting to use curare, a Cholinergic antagonist, to this end, she observed instead a change in the cells' spontaneous synaptic activity. This activity was unusual, so she refocused her research on this hyperpolarizing response for several years. After many tests using a setup of her own design Kehoe discovered that methyl-xylocholine, an Adrenergic neuron blocker, inhibited the K-dependent response she had found in the cells. This was unusual, as the Aplysia response she was researching was cholinergic and was not expected to change with the addition of an adrenergic inhibitor. From this data Kehoe determined that both the adrenergic and cholinergic responses she observed involved the same receptor. She determined that multiple receptors for a particular neurotransmitter could be found on a neuron, each receptor could change the conductance of the neurotransmitter in a different and independent manner, and that the postsynaptic response could vary from cell to cell.

Kehoe then took a position as a full-time researcher at the Centre national de la recherche scientifique (C.N.R.S.). In 1968 she and Philippe traveled to Cambridge on sabbatical, where they continued their research. Kehoe worked under Gabriel Horn in the anatomy department, who arranged for her to be admitted to High Table at King's College. At the time High Table was all male—Kehoe was the first visiting female academic to be granted access.

In the same year her husband Philippe accepted a teaching position in Paris, so that they could operate their own lab. Upon their return from Cambridge they were given space for their lab at École Normale Supérieure. Over the following summers Kehoe also acted as an instructor at a research program in the United States. At Cold Spring Harbor Laboratory, she taught summer courses to students with an interest in neuroscience research from 1971 to the mid-1980s. Kehoe continued to travel the world, giving seminars and conferences on her discoveries, as well as performing her own experiments. She continued her research to identify the neurotransmitters used in Aplysia, turning her attention towards glutamate receptors in the late 20th century. In 2002 she and Philippe gave up their lab to other researchers, and moved their research to the lab of their colleagues, Alain Marty and Isabel Llano, in another part of Paris. As of 2017 Kehoe continued researching neurotransmitters and their effects.

== Personal life ==
In 1967 Kehoe married fellow researcher and French native Philippe Ascher. In the fall of 1968 she had her first son David. Her second son Ivan was born after she began working at Cold Spring. Until her death, she spent most of her life in Paris with her husband and their two children.

== Works ==
- Kehoe, Jacsue (1963-06-01). "Effects of prior and interpolated learning on retention in pigeons". Journal of Experimental Psychology. 65 (6): 537–545. doi:10.1037/h0041864. PMID 14031682.
- Kehoe, J. (1967-09-30). "Pharmacological characteristics and ionic bases of a 2 component postsynaptic inhibition". Nature. 215 (5109): 1503–1505. Bibcode:1967Natur.215.1503K. doi:10.1038/2151503b0. PMID 4293852. S2CID 4186621.
- Kehoe, J. (1969-03-01). "Single presynaptic neurone mediates a two component postsynaptic inhibition". Nature. 221 (5183): 866–868. Bibcode:1969Natur.221..866K. doi:10.1038/221866a0. PMID 4387868. S2CID 4176193.
- Kehoe, J. S.; Ascher, P. (1970-02-28). "Re-evaluation of the synaptic activation of an electrogenic sodium pump". Nature. 225 (5235): 820–823. Bibcode:1970Natur.225..820K. doi:10.1038/225820a0. PMID 5415112. S2CID 4256264.
- Kehoe, J. (1972-08-01). "Three acetylcholine receptors in Aplysia neurones". The Journal of Physiology. 225 (1): 115–146. doi:10.1113/jphysiol.1972.sp009931. PMC 1331096. PMID 4679741.
- Kehoe, J. (1978-08-31). "Transformation by concanavalin A of the response of molluscan neurones to L-glutamate". Nature. 274 (5674): 866–869. Bibcode:1978Natur.274..866K. doi:10.1038/274866a0. PMID 210395. S2CID 4294451.
- Kehoe, J. (1990-10-01). "Cyclic AMP-induced slow inward current: its synaptic manifestation in Aplysia neurons". The Journal of Neuroscience. 10 (10): 3208–3218. doi:10.1523/JNEUROSCI.10-10-03208.1990. PMC 6570174. PMID 1698941.
- Kehoe, J.; McIntosh, J. M. (1998-10-15). "Two distinct nicotinic receptors, one pharmacologically similar to the vertebrate alpha7-containing receptor, mediate Cl currents in aplysia neurons". The Journal of Neuroscience. 18 (20): 8198–8213. doi:10.1523/JNEUROSCI.18-20-08198.1998. PMC 6792842. PMID 9763466.
- Kehoe, JacSue; Vulfius, Catherine (2000-12-01). "Independence of and Interactions between GABA-, Glutamate-, and Acetylcholine-Activated Cl Conductances in AplysiaNeurons". Journal of Neuroscience. 20 (23): 8585–8596. doi:10.1523/JNEUROSCI.20-23-08585.2000. PMC 6773048. PMID 11102462.
- Tieman, T. L.; Steel, D. J.; Gor, Y.; Kehoe, J.; Schwartz, J. H.; Feinmark, S. J. (2001-05-01). "A pertussis toxin-sensitive 8-lipoxygenase pathway is activated by a nicotinic acetylcholine receptor in aplysia neurons". Journal of Neurophysiology. 85 (5): 2150–2158. doi:10.1152/jn.2001.85.5.2150. PMID 11353029.
- Kehoe, JacSue; Buldakova, Svetlana; Acher, Francine; Dent, Joseph; Bregestovski, Piotr; Bradley, Jonathan (2009-06-25). "Aplysia cys-loop Glutamate-Gated Chloride Channels Reveal Convergent Evolution of Ligand Specificity". Journal of Molecular Evolution. 69 (2): 125–141. Bibcode:2009JMolE..69..125K. doi:10.1007/s00239-009-9256-z. PMID 19554247. S2CID 31988613.
- Blarre, Thomas; Bertrand, Hugues-Olivier; Acher, Francine C.; Kehoe, JacSue (2014-09-26). "Molecular Determinants of Agonist Selectivity in Glutamate-Gated Chloride Channels Which Likely Explain the Agonist Selectivity of the Vertebrate Glycine and GABAA-ρ Receptors". PLOS ONE. 9 (9) e108458. Bibcode:2014PLoSO...9j8458B. doi:10.1371/journal.pone.0108458. PMC 4178172. PMID 25259865.
