= Daniel Louvard =

French scientist

Daniel Louvard (French pronunciation: [danjɛl luvaʁ]) is a French scientist with the Department of Cell Biology in the Curie institute, Paris. In 1996 he won the Richard Lounsbery Award jointly with Jacques Pouysségur for "their contributions to the study of the regulation of cell division and differentiation."

== Biography ==
Professor Daniel Louvard (born February 20, 1948) obtained his doctorate in biochemistry in 1973 and in physical sciences in 1976 at the University of Marseille. From 1978 to 1982, he headed a team at the European Molecular Biology Laboratory (LEBM, Heidelberg, Germany), then joined the Institut Pasteur where, from 1988 to 1990, he was head of the Molecular Biology Department and, since 1987, has been a professor. He was Director of Research at the CNRS (1986–2013) and Director of the Institut Curie Research Centre (1993–2013).

He is now Director of Research Emeritus at the CNRS, Honorary Professor at the Institut Pasteur, Honorary Director at the Institut Curie, Advisor to the chairman of the Board of Directors of the Institut Curie for International Affairs. In 2014 and 2015, he was on sabbatical leave as a visiting scientist at Biogen (Cambridge, USA).

Professor Louvard was also in charge of the Institut Curie / CNRS UMR 144 (1995–2013) morphogenesis and cell signalling laboratory. He has been a member of numerous scientific committees of the CNRS and the Institut de la santé et de la recherche médicale (Inserm), ad hoc committees and scientific organizations such as EMBO and the Scientific Committee of the Human Frontier Science Programme, and a member of the ERC committee for advanced scholarships.

Member of the Academy of Sciences (2003), the European Academy of Sciences (1995), the Academia Europa (1997), the European Academy of Cancer Sciences (2013), foreign member of the American Academy of Arts and Sciences (2014).

Former Vice-president of the French government's cancer control mission (2002–2003), Professor Louvard was permanent advisor to the government's inter-ministerial plan for cancer control (2003–2005). From 2013 to 2018, he was Chairman of the International Scientific Council of the National Cancer Institute (INCa) and vice-chairman of the LEBM Scientific Advisory Board (2012–2017).

He has been a member of various editorial boards, including EMBO Journal, Current Opinion in Cell Biology, Gastroenterology and editor of the Journal of Cell Science.

He is a Knight of the National Order of Merit (1992), Knight of the Legion of Honour (2000) and Officer of the Legion of Honour (2012).

== Scientific work ==
Daniel Louvard is a biochemist, cell and molecular biologist. His fundamental research focuses on epithelial functions, in particular vesicular membrane trafficking, intercellular junctions and actin cytoskeleton of polarized epithelial cells. He continues his research on the molecular basis of cell polarity, cell motility and cell plasticity. More recently, he has developed new research on transgenic mice. These genetically modified animal models, containing transgenes expressed only in the intestine and subject to strict conditional control, have allowed his group to study the molecular basis of carcinogenesis of the digestive epithelium in order to develop new diagnostic and therapeutic approaches to malignant colonic metastases.

At the European Molecular Biology Laboratory he created his first research group in 1978. His work was devoted to intracellular membrane trafficking and the polarity of epithelial cells. At the Pasteur Institute in 1982 he continued his research on cell polarity, actin cytoskeleton and intestinal cell differentiation. At the Institut Curie in 1993, his work continued in several directions with a team of 20 people: cell polarity, signalling via surface receptors and actin cytoskeleton, development of mouse models of intestinal carcinogenesis, cell morphogenesis, stem cells and cancer. His research, which has been concretized and recognized internationally, invitations as a speaker (more than 100 invited conferences), scientific awards, national and international research grants have been one of the aspects of his scientific career.

Daniel Louvard has also contributed his skills as a member of scientific councils to numerous organizations for the evaluation of researchers' or institutions' research projects (CNRS, Inserm, EMBO, EMBL, ERC, ANR, Institut Pasteur, IECB, ENS, INCa, MRC, VIB, Singapore University, Max Planck, NIH, American Universities ....) or by participating in the evaluation and awarding of prizes (Académie des Sciences, Fondation Bettencourt, Fondation IPSEN, ARC, LNCC, Fondation Kôrber...).

Passionate about research and teaching, two fundamental missions of the research profession, he has contributed throughout his career to the teaching of Masters and Doctorates at Parisian and provincial universities. He created and co-directed for more than 15 years the Molecular Biology Course of the Institut Pasteur Cell. He has directed or co-directed more than 70 university theses.

Convinced after his experience as group leader at EMBL of the importance of research groups led by promising young team leaders, he inspired Claude Paoletti to create the CNRS's ATIPE program and chaired the first international ATIPE committee (Cell Biology) in 1989.

In 1993, at the request of the President of the Institut Curie, Prof. C. Burg, he joined the foundation to restructure the research of the Institut Curie. In 1995 a new Cellular Biology unit was created (UMR144 CNRS Institut Curie), links with the Physics section were renewed, new UMRs and Inserm Units created or reorganized. Fourteen research units of the Institut Curie have been brought together in the Institut Curie Research Centre (1300 people 90 million consolidated budget in 2013). The results of the teams at the Research Centre place the Institut Curie among the best European institutions in the field of life sciences.

Simultaneously with the development of fundamental research in Curie, he was able to create in 2003 the translational research department co-managed with the Institut Curie Hospital and inaugurate in 2008 a new building housing the Department of Biology and Development Genetics (UMR CNRS/Unit INSERM/Institut Curie) and the INSERM Bioinformatics Unit created in 2003. Concerned with the promotion of fundamental research, he worked with the President of the Institut Curie to create the department of valorisation and industrial relations in 2000, which facilitated the creation of 15 start-ups in biotechnology. These were founded and led by CNRS or INSERM researchers working at the Institut Curie.

== Distinctions ==
Professor Daniel LOUVARD has received numerous prizes, including the FEBS Prize (1983), the Alexandre Joannidès Prize from the Academy of Sciences (1987), the Lounsbery Prize from the French and American Academy of Sciences (1996), the Claude Bernard Grand Prize of the City of Paris (2008). ), the Inserm Honorary Prize 2013.

He is an officer of the National Order of the Legion of Honour and the National Order of Merit.

He has published 317 publications since 1973 (Google Scholar: 24336 citations – H-index 90). He is co-author of 20 patents.
