= Sjöberg Prize =

The Sjöberg Prize
- Awarded for: Significant contributions to cancer research
- Country: Sweden
- Presented by: Royal Swedish Academy of Sciences
- First award: 2017
- Website: Swedish English

The Sjöberg Prize is an award aimed at individuals or research groups that have made significant contributions to cancer research. The Sjöberg Prize is awarded as a partnership between the Royal Swedish Academy of Sciences and the Sjöberg Foundation. The Sjöberg Foundation also finances the prize. The Foundation was founded in 2016, and the first prize was announced in February 2017.

The foundation was founded by businessman Bengt Sjöberg, who donated two billion Swedish kronor to promote scientific research, with the main focus on cancer, health and the environment. The prize, which is international, is planned to be awarded annually. It consists of a 100,000 US dollars of free disposal and 900,000 dollars to fund future research making up a total of one million US dollars. The prize money increases to counteract inflation.

== Laureates ==
Year	Image	Laureate	Nationality	Work	Ref.
2017	James P. Allison	James P. Allison	American	“Pioneering studies of cellular processes which led to the development of new effective cancer drugs”	
2017	Tony Hunter	Tony Hunter	British-American	“Pioneering studies of cellular processes which led to the development of new effective cancer drugs”	
2018	Chen Zhu	Zhu Chen	Chinese	“for the clarification of molecular mechanisms and the development of a revolutionary treatment for acute promyelocytic leukaemia”	
2018	Anne Dejean	Anne Dejean	French	“for the clarification of molecular mechanisms and the development of a revolutionary treatment for acute promyelocytic leukaemia”	
2018		Hugues de Thé	French	“for the clarification of molecular mechanisms and the development of a revolutionary treatment for acute promyelocytic leukaemia”	
2019		Dennis Slamon	American	“for their groundbreaking contributions to the clinical development of targeted therapy directed against genetic aberrations in cancer.”	
2019	Brian Druker	Brian Druker	American	“for their groundbreaking contributions to the clinical development of targeted therapy directed against genetic aberrations in cancer.”	
2020	Michael Hall	Michael N. Hall	American	“for their discovery of mTOR and its role in the control of cell metabolism and growth.”	
2020		David M. Sabatini	American-Argentine	“for their discovery of mTOR and its role in the control of cell metabolism and growth.”	
2021		Benjamin L. Ebert	American	“for his discovery of the mode of action of lenalidomide in the treatment of haematological disorders”	
2022		Arul Chinnaiyan	American	"for the discovery of recurrent gene fusions in prostate cancer"	
2023		Kevan Shokat	American	“for discoveries that enable the inhibition of mutated K-Ras in cancer treatment”	
2024		Catherine J. Wu	American	“for discoveries concerning tumour neoantigens and the immune response to tumour cells as a basis for cancer vaccine development”	
2025		Miriam Merad		“for discoveries identifying the origin of myeloid cell subtypes and elucidating how they modulate antitumour immunity”	
2026		Charles Swanton	British	"who has provided fundamental knowledge about evolution in tumours."	
