= Pierre Léopold =

French scientist

Pierre Léopold (born 6 May 1960) is a research director at the French National Institute for Health and Medical Research (Inserm) and a member of the Institut de France. He heads the Unit of Genetics and Developmental Biology (UMR3215 CNRS / U934 Inserm) at the Curie Institute (Paris), and works with his team to understand the growth processes of organisms.

== Biography ==
Pierre Léopold undertook higher education at the Lycée St Louis in Paris and then at the École Normale Supérieure in St Cloud. He defended his university thesis (PhD) in 1990 at the University of Nice-Sophia Antipolis after working in F. Cuzin's team. He then started a post-doctoral internship from 1990 to 1993 at the University of California, San Francisco (UCSF) in the team of Pr. Patrick O'Farrell. He returned to France and created his research team with an ATIP-CNRS funding at the Villefranche-sur-mer Observatory. From 1998 to 2018, he was team leader at the ISBDC of the University of Nice (direction Jacques Pouyssegur), which then became the Institut de Biologie Valrose (dir. S. Noselli). In 2019, he became director of the Unit of Genetics and Developmental Biology at the Curie Institute.

== Scientific interests and achievements ==
Following his thesis work on the biology of oncogenic viruses, Pierre Léopold started being interested in developmental biology and studied the control of cell proliferation during the formation of the Drosophila embryo (post-doctoral internship in the team of Pr. P. O'Farrell, UCSF). This work allowed him to identify a new cdk complex, cyclin C/Cdk8, involved in the function of the mediator, controlling transcription by polymerase II. He also studied the function of another cdk complex, cyclin H/Cdk7, and its role in the initiation of zygotic transcription during the early development of Drosophila.

After returning to France, he and his team began to study mechanisms of organ and organismal growth in the Drosophila model. The approaches used by the team are at the frontier between genetics and physiology and address two major questions in the field of growth. Firstly, the team is interested in the mechanisms of growth induction by nutrition and highlighted the role of "sentinel" organs controlling growth in a systemic manner in response to nutritional information. This research uses genetic tools specific to the Drosophila model (unbiased genetic screens, loss of function by spatially targeted RNA-interference) to understand the inter-organ crosstalks and more particularly the endocrine relays existing between peripheral tissues and the central complex (brain/endocrine glands) where insulin/IGF and steroid hormones are produced. This work sheds light on how a nutritional signal (amino acid) activates the TOR kinase pathway in the fat body (functional equivalent of liver and adipose tissue in insects). This activation in turn leads to the production of specific relay inducing the production of systemic insulin-like growth hormones/IGF by the brain. This work also identifies functional interactions between growth hormones (insulin/IGF) and the steroid hormone (ecdysone) controlling the developmental program.

In parallel to this line of research, the team is studying the mechanisms of growth coordination allowing the maintenance of organ proportions in response to a localized alteration of growth, as well as the coupling between tissue growth and the developmental progression. This recent work led to the identification of a hormonal mechanism predicted 30 years earlier allowing damaged tissues (genetic ablation or tumor growth) to act on the growth of other organs and to control the end of the juvenile period through the production of a relaxin-like hormone called Dilp8 and its receptor Lgr3 in the brain.

More recently, the team's work has focused on the study of the genetic mechanisms of developmental precision allowing fine adjustment of growth parameters during development, with a particular focus on bilateral organs.

The work of Pierre Léopold interrogates the normal physiology of biological systems, as well as the metabolic disturbances observed in response to altered hormone response pathways (insulin/IGF, steroids), tumor formation, or during tissue regeneration.

== Honours and awards ==
- 2020 Elected member of the French Academy of sciences
- 2019 Elected member of the Academia Europaea
- 2018 Grand Prize of the Fondation pour la Recherche Médicale (FRM)
- 2016 ERC Advanced grant recipient
- 2014 AXA/French Academy of science "Major advances in..." Award
- 2011 Inserm Research Prize
- 2010 Recipient of an ERC Advanced grant
- 2009 J. Martin Award - Academy of Sciences
- 2008 Elected member of EMBO
- 2006 AXA/Academy of Science "Major advances in..." Award
- 1993 CNRS ATIP recipient
