= Richard Lounsbery Award =

Scientific award

The Richard Lounsbery Award is given to American and French scientists, 45 years or younger, in recognition of "extraordinary scientific achievement in biology and medicine."

The Award alternates between French and American scientists, and is awarded by the National Academy of Sciences and the French Academy of Sciences in alternating years to a scientist from the other country. The award is selected by a seven-member jury representing both the French and the US Academies. The recipient receives a $75,000 prize, funding to visit a lab or research institution in the awarding country, and an invitation to give the Lounsbery Lecture in the awarding country.

The Lounsbery Award was established in 1979 by Vera Lounsbery in memory of her husband, Richard Lounsbery, and is funded by the Richard Lounsbery Foundation. Richard and Vera met in Paris after World War I, and the couple divided their time between Paris and New York.

== Award recipients ==
- 2026, David Bikard, for outstanding contributions to microbiology and synthetic biology.
- 2025 Michael M. Yartsev for pivotal contributions advancing our understanding of systems neuroscience.
- 2024 Jean-Léon Maître, for outstanding and innovative work in mammalian developmental biology.
- 2023 Michelle Monje, for her groundbreaking discoveries that neuronal activity promotes adaptive myelination important for cognition, and that neuronal activity drives malignant glioma progression through neuron-to-glioma synapses and paracrine factors. These contributions have elucidated new perspectives in neuroscience and pioneered the field of cancer neuroscience.
- 2022 Claire Wyart, for her outstanding research on the sensory interface between the central nervous system and cerebrospinal fluid that controls our posture and movements.
- 2021 Feng Zhang, for his pioneering achievements in the field of genome editing, including the discovery of novel CRISPR systems and their development as molecular tools.
- 2020 Marie Manceau, for her work in developmental biology, in particular training and evolution of periodic patterns on the plumage of birds.
- 2019 Jay Shendure, for his pioneering work and leadership in the second wave of genomics that is transforming genetics and medicine. Through his development of exome sequencing and other novel technologies, he has defined new paradigms for implicating Mendelian disease genes, interpreting genetic variation, and single cell profiling of developmental lineages and gene regulation in whole organisms.
- 2018 Yohanns Bellaïche, For his work on the genetic and mechanical regulation that underlies tissue proliferation, homeostasis and repair in physiological and pathological conditions (using a combination of interdisciplinary approaches involving sophisticated imaging, genetics, large-scale molecular approaches, and computational analyses) including the mechanisms of local and long-range mechano-sensing during cytokinesis that remodel the dividing cell adherens junction.
- 2017 Pardis Sabeti, for her contributions to global health and study of emerging diseases and pandemics, including ebola, Lassa fever, and malaria
- 2016 Bruno Klaholz, for his work in Structural Biology (by X-ray diffraction and cryo-electron microscopy methods) on the regulation of gene expression at both the transcriptional level (structures of the nuclear receptors to retinoic acid and vitamin D) and the protein translation level (initiation and termination complexes, and the structure of the human ribosome).
- 2015 Hopi Hoekstra, for her work probing the molecular basis of how adaptation to novel selective pressures establishes and sustains diversity during evolution.
- 2014 Frédéric Saudou, for his major contributions to the understanding of molecular and cellular mechanisms causing Huntington's disease.
- 2013 Karl Deisseroth, for pioneering the technology called optogenetics in which insertion of a single bacterial protein into a neuron allows exquisite control of the neuron with light.
- 2012 Olivier Pourquié , for his work in embryonic patterning in vertebrates and particularly in the genetic and developmental mechanisms that control segmentation.
- 2011 Bonnie L. Bassler, for her pioneering discoveries of the universal use of chemical communication among bacteria and the elucidation of structural and regulatory mechanisms controlling bacterial assemblies.
- 2010 Gérard Karsenty, for his work on the molecular mechanisms that underlie the formation and the remodeling of bone.
- 2009 Cornelia I. Bargmann, for her extraordinarily inventive and successful use of molecular and classical genetics to probe the individual nerve cell basis of behavior in C. elegans.
- 2008 Jean-Laurent Casanova, for his contributions to the understanding the genetic basis of the predisposition to viral and bacterial diseases of childhood, which have important clinical implications for the diagnostic and management of infectious diseases.
- 2007 Xiaodong Wang, for his pioneering biochemical studies on apoptosis, which have elucidated a molecular pathway leading into and out of the mitochondrion and to the nucleus.
- 2006 Catherine Dulac, for her major contributions in the perception and behavioral translation of pheromones in mammals.
- 2005 John Kuriyan, for his critical role in revealing the structural mechanisms underlying processivity in DNA replication and the regulation of tyrosine kinases and their interacting target proteins.
- 2004 Brigitte Kieffer, for her pioneering work on the molecular neurobiology of opioid-controlled behaviors, the results of which have very important implications for the treatment of pain, drug abuse, and emotional disorders.
- 2003 Carol W. Greider, for her pioneering biochemical and genetic studies of telomerase, the enzyme that maintains the ends of chromosomes in eukaryotic cells.
- 2002 Denis Le Bihan, for his work on the invention and development of nuclear magnetic resonance imaging of brain diffusion and perfusion. The method he developed permits in vivo mapping of nerve fiber bundles and has multiple applications in both medical pathology and cognitive science fields.
- 2001 Elaine Fuchs, for her fundamental insights into structure and function of cytoskeletal proteins and the relation of these proteins to human genetic diseases.
- 2000 Miroslav Radman, for his contribution to the discovery of the molecular mechanisms implicated in the replication and repair of DNA, in particular, the discovery of a key enzyme of the DNA repair mechanism.
- 1999 Elliot M. Meyerowitz, for his pioneering contributions to the molecular genetics of plant architecture, which have practical implications for agriculture.
- 1998 Pascale Cossart, for her fundamental discoveries in microbiology dealing with mechanisms of bacterial entry and intracellular host motility.
- 1997 James E. Rothman, for his dissection of the biochemical mechanisms by which proteins are transferred from one cellular compartment to another and to the outside world. These mechanisms are important in neurotransmission, tissue biogenesis, and hormonal secretion.
- 1996 Daniel Louvard and Jacques Pouysségur, for their contributions to the study of the regulation of cell division and differentiation.
- 1995 Douglas A. Melton, for showing how cells and tissues differentiate during vertebrate development through studies on localized mRNAs in eggs and the genes that induce mesoderm and neural tissue.
- 1994 Jean Louis Mandel, for his work in human genetics and in particular for his discovery of the mutation of fragile X. This new type of mutation has now been found at the origin of the diseases.
- 1993 Stanley B. Prusiner and Bert Vogelstein, for their distinct and exciting discoveries about the pathogenesis of neurodegenerative and malignant diseases. This award is given as a celebration of the power of modern molecular medicine.
- 1992 Philippe Ascher and Henri Korn, for their discoveries of the mechanisms of synaptic transmission. Philippe Ascher furthered knowledge regarding the properties of glutamate receptors which play an important role in trials, and Henri Korn brought to light the elementary liberation of neurotransmitter in quanta form in the central nervous system of vertebrates.
- 1991 Marc W. Kirschner, for elucidating key steps in the cell cycle, chromosome movement, cell cycle timing, nucleus breakdown and reformation, and microtubule control of cell polarity and mitosis.
- 1991 Harold Weintraub, for elucidating a molecular mechanism by which a single regulatory gene can lead to a program of cell differentiation.
- 1990 Jean Rosa, for his contributions, which have opened a new road in the control of oxygen transport in the blood and the treatment of the first worldwide genetic plague, drepanocytosis.
- 1989 Richard Axel, for his discoveries elucidating gene structure in animal cells.
- 1988 François Cuzin, for his original contributions in the elucidation of the mechanisms involved in malignant cell transformation, in particular, demonstration of the necessary contribution of two oncogenes.
- 1987 Alfred G. Gilman and Martin Rodbell, for their discoveries regarding the proteins and mechanisms that mediate cellular responses to the binding of ligands to cell surface receptors.
- 1986 André Capron and Jacques Glowinski, for their fundamental work, which has contributed to the treatment of parasitic and neurological diseases.
- 1985 Martin Gellert and Thomas Maniatis, for their seminal contributions to our understanding of the structure and function of DNA, which were essential and fundamental to the development of recombinant DNA techniques.
- 1984 Maxime Schwartz, for his genetic and biochemical analysis of the maltose system of E. coli, which paved the way for the solution of a series of fundamental problems in molecular biology.
- 1983 Günter Blobel, for his work in uncovering the molecular interactions that control the traffic of newly synthesized proteins in eukaryotic cells, for his incisive experiments, and for the beauty of the findings by which he established these interactions.
- 1982 Pierre Chambon and Jean-Pierre Changeux, for their work on fundamental structures of genetic material and of the nervous system.
- 1981 Philip Leder, for his series of notable contributions in molecular genetics, which help to explain the means by which genetic information is organized and used to direct the synthesis of specific cell products.
- 1980 François M. M. Morel, for his work on the physiology of the kidney.
- 1979 Michael S. Brown and Joseph L. Goldstein, for their work in cholesterol biosynthesis.

== See also ==
- List of biomedical science awards
