= Henri Korn =

French neuroscientist (1934–2023)

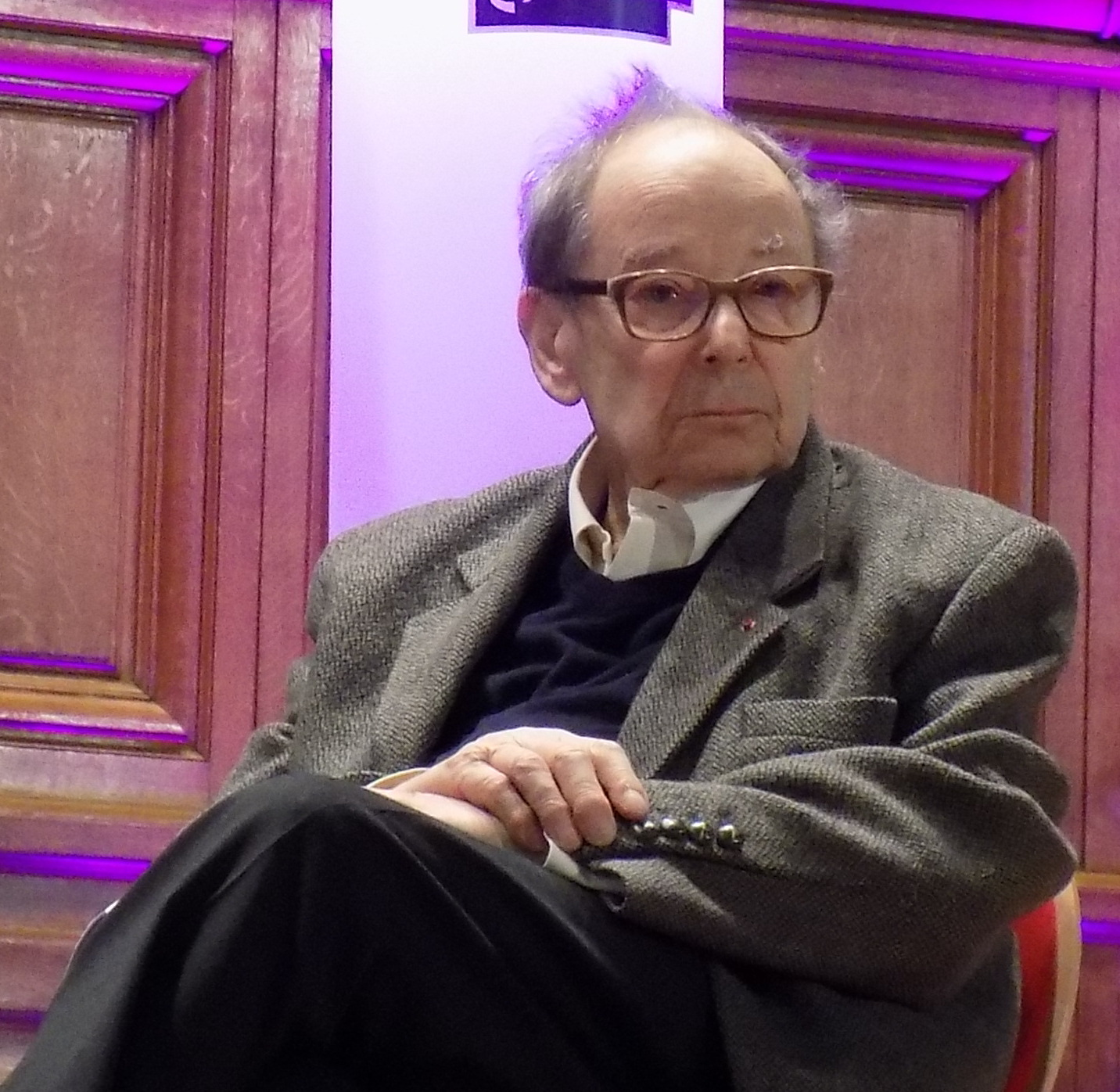
- Korn in 2016
- Born: 15 February 1934
- Died: 2 November 2023 (aged 89)
- Occupation: Neuroscientist

Henri Korn (15 February 1934 – 2 November 2023) was a French neuroscientist with the Pasteur Institute.

== Life and career ==
Korn was born on 15 November 1934. In 1992 he won the Richard Lounsbery Award jointly with Philippe Ascher for "their discoveries of the mechanisms of synaptic transmission. Philippe Asher (sic) furthered knowledge regarding the properties of glutamate receptors which play an important role in trials, and Henri Korn brought to light the elementary liberation of neurotransmitter in quanta form in the central nervous system of vertebrates."

In 2007, a re-analysis of Korn's data by Jacques Ninio in the Journal of Neurophysiology showed serious anomalies that suggested the results of his research were fabricated.

He died on 2 November 2023, at the age of 89.
