= Dennis Slamon =

American physician

Dennis J. Slamon
- Born: August 6, 1948 (age 78); New Castle, Pennsylvania
- Education: Washington & Jefferson College (B.A.); University of Chicago (Ph.D. cell biology, M.D. (1975))
- Occupations: oncologist, professor
- Awards: Gairdner Foundation International Award (2007); Scheele Award (2009); The Sjöberg Prize (2019); Albany Medical Center Prize (2026)

Dennis Joseph Slamon (born August 6, 1948), is an American oncologist and chief of the division of Hematology-Oncology at UCLA. He is best known for his work identifying the HER2/neu oncogene that is amplified in 25–33% of breast cancer patients and the resulting treatment trastuzumab.

He currently serves as director of Clinical/Translational Research at UCLA's Jonsson Comprehensive Cancer Center, and as director of the Revlon/UCLA Women's Cancer Research Program at JCCC. He is a professor of medicine, chief of the Division of Hematology/Oncology and executive vice chair for research for UCLA's Department of Medicine. Slamon also serves as director of the medical advisory board for the National Colorectal Cancer Research Alliance, a fund-raising organization that promotes advances in colorectal cancer.

== Early life and education ==
Slamon was born to parents of Syrian descent, his father left Syria at age 8, and later worked as a coal miner in West Virginia. He attended Washington & Jefferson College for its pre-med program.

A 1975 honors graduate of the Pritzker School of Medicine at the University of Chicago, Slamon earned his Ph.D. in cell biology that same year. He completed his internship and residency at the University of Chicago Hospitals and Clinics, becoming chief resident in 1978. One year later, he became a fellow in the Division of Hematology/Oncology at UCLA, Los Angeles.

== Career ==
In 1986 Axel Ullrich, a German scientist working at Genentech, first discovered the Her-2 protein and gave a conference about it in which Slamon was present. Afterwards Slamon proposed to work together, since he suspected that a mutation in Her-2 might cause cancer, eventually they found a kind of aggressive breast cancer with a mutation in the gene responsible for the Her-2 protein and started working on producing an antibody to block that protein, hoping to create a new breast cancer treatment; however Genentech had serious administrative conflicts regarding the direction of their research at the time and they refused to fund their research, with Ullrich leaving the company.

Despite not working at Genentech, Slamon kept insisting, which led to him being known and disliked among the staff, but eventually he convinced a group of Genentech scientists and got funds to do a small study, which proved the efficacy of the Her-2 antibody in fighting breast cancer which convinced Genentech to launch a full scale research and development effort, which concluded in the creating of new more effective breast cancer treatments.

For 12 years, Dr. Slamon and his colleagues conducted the laboratory and clinical research that led to the development of the new breast cancer drug Herceptin, which targets a specific genetic alteration found in about 25 percent of breast cancer patients. To acknowledge Slamon's accomplishments, President Bill Clinton appointed Slamon to the three-member President's Cancer Panel in June 2000.

Slamon and his colleagues set out to find ways to target their treatments. They took breast cancer cells and mimicked what was happening in their patients, looking at genetic alterations in the genes that regulate growth. One of them was a gene called HER-2, human epidermal growth factor receptor No. 2.

The researchers saw that women who had the HER-2 alteration weren't doing as well because they had a more aggressive tumor. That made it a logical target. Slamon's group found that when they added an antibody to the receptor that the gene made when it mutated, the tumor growth rate dropped dramatically.

The process of identifying the target and validating it in the laboratory worked not just for breast cancer, but for other major malignancies, he said. The UCLA researchers developed models for several cancers, seeing which antibodies worked and which didn't.

== Popular culture ==
His life and research was the template for the plot of the film Living Proof (2008), starring Harry Connick, Jr. Slamon's cancer research is discussed in the second episode of Cancer: The Emperor of All Maladies.

== Honors and awards ==
- 2002 Jacob Heskel Gabbay Award in Biotechnology and Medicine
- 2007 Gairdner Foundation International Award
- 2017 Komen Brinker Award for Scientific Distinction
- 2019 Lasker-DeBakey Clinical Medical Research Award
- 2019 Sjöberg Prize
- 2024 Szent-Györgyi Prize
- 2026 Albany Medical Center Prize
