= Adrenergic neuron blockers =

Class of drugs

Adrenergic neurone blockers, commonly known as adrenergic antagonists, are a group of drugs that inhibit the sympathetic nervous system by blocking the activity of adrenergic neurones. They prevent the action or release of catecholamines such as norepinephrine and epinephrine. They are located throughout the body, causing various physiological reactions including bronchodilation, accelerated heartbeat, and vasoconstriction. They work by inhibiting the synthesis, release, or reuptake of the neurotransmitters or by antagonising the receptors on postsynaptic neurones. Their medical uses, mechanisms of action, adverse effects, and contraindications depend on the specific types of adrenergic blockers used, including alpha 1, alpha 2, beta 1, and beta 2.

== Medical uses ==
There are various labeled uses of adrenergic neurone blockers that are approved by the Food and Drug Administration (FDA), alongside some off-label uses.

=== Alpha 1 blockers ===
Alpha 1 blockers cause vasodilation by relaxing smooth muscles that control blood vessel diameter, leading to lower blood pressure. FDA-approved uses of these drugs include treating conditions like benign prostatic hyperplasia, hypertension, pheochromocytoma, extravasation management, and reversal of local anesthesia.

Common examples of alpha 1 blockers are Tamsulosin, Prazosin, Phentolamine, and Phenoxybenzamine. Each agent has its own off-label uses, some examples include Tamsulosin for urinary disorders, Prazosin for post-traumatic stress disorder-related nightmares and Raynaud phenomenon, Phentolamine for hypertensive crisis and extravasation of vasopressors, and Phenoxybenzamine for neurogenic bladder and prostate obstruction.

=== Alpha 2 blockers ===
Alpha 2 blockers are mainly neurotransmitter release inhibitors. They inhibit the release of circulating adrenergic neurotransmitters like norepinephrine, which contributes to the contraction of smooth muscles. Examples of alpha 2 blockers include yohimbine and idazoxan. Apart from being used as antidotes to reverse the overdose effects of alpha 2 agonists, they only have a limited number of indications. For instance, Yohimbine has been used to treat sexual dysfunction in males. However, the effectiveness of this medication for treating sexual dysfunction has not been established. As a result, it is currently not approved by the FDA for this indication. Although Idazoxan is still being used in research, it has no established clinical roles.

=== Beta 1 blockers ===
Beta 1 blockers are receptor antagonists that bind to and antagonise beta 1 receptors, which are extensively located in the heart. The majority of FDA-labeled uses of beta 1 blockers target the abnormalities of the heart to treat heart-related disorders including hypertension, heart failure, chronic stable angina, post-myocardial infarction, and decreased left ventricular function after a recent myocardial infarction.

They can treat other non-cardiac symptoms as off-label uses, such as migraine prophylaxis, arrhythmias, tremors, and anxiety disorders. Common examples include atenolol, bisoprolol, esmolol, metoprolol, and nebivolol.

=== Beta 2 blockers ===
Beta 2 blockers primarily contract the smooth muscles in various tissues, particularly airway smooth muscles where beta 2 receptors are predominantly present. There are currently no FDA-approved beta 2 antagonists for clinical uses. Butoxamine, an example of a beta 2 blocker, is only used in research.

== Mechanism of Action ==
=== Alpha 1 blockers ===
Activation of alpha 1 receptors.The initial binding of ligand to GPCR is blocked by alpha 1 blocker.

Alpha 1 blockers prevent smooth muscle contraction by inhibiting the downstream activation of Gq-type G-protein coupled receptors. This downstream activation is caused by the activation of phospholipase C upon ligand binding, which increases intracellular calcium concentration and leads to smooth muscle contraction. By inhibiting this activation, alpha 1 blockers prevent the increase in intracellular calcium concentration and subsequent smooth muscle contraction. This is achieved by antagonising the Gq type G-protein coupled receptors, thus the downstream signaling pathway.

Alpha 2 blockers

Alpha 2 blockers inhibit the activation of adenylyl cyclase via Gi protein by antagonising alpha 2 receptors, which curbs the synthesis of cyclic AMP (cAMP). This subsequently reduces the concentration of calcium and the release of neurotransmitters, resulting in smooth muscle dilation.

Beta 1 blockers

Beta 1 blockers bind to the beta 1 receptor without activating it, inhibiting the receptor-mediated effects. The beta-1 receptor is a G-protein-coupled receptor with the Gs alpha subunit as its main signaling protein. The subunit dissociates from the receptor when activated, subsequently activating adenylyl cyclase to convert adenosine triphosphate (ATP) to cAMP, which is a secondary messenger mediating the pharmacological effects. Since beta 1 receptors are densely located in the heart, beta 1 blockers can effectively control heart rate by chronotropic effect and contractility by inotropic effect.

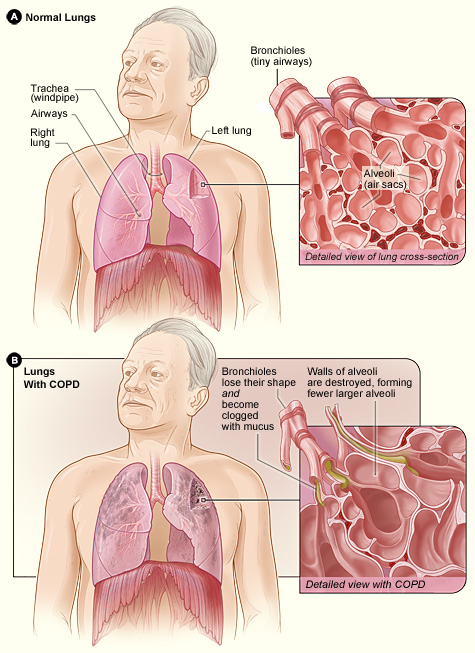
Presentations of chronic obstructive pulmonary disease (COPD)

Beta 2 blockers

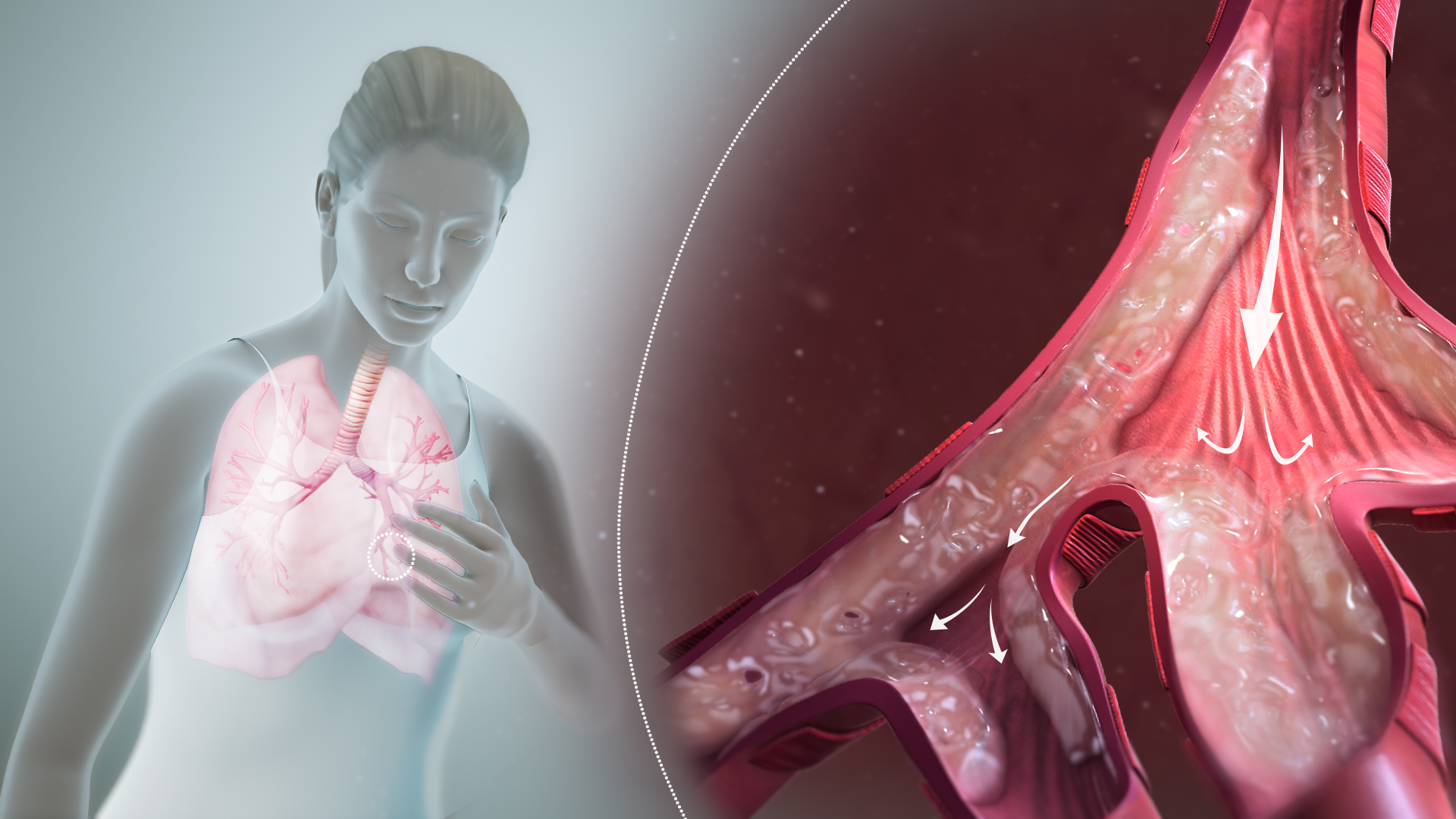
Constriction of airway

Beta 2 blockers function by prohibiting beta 2 receptor stimulation via blocking the dissociation of the alpha subunit of Gs protein and subsequent activation of adenylyl cyclase, which reduces the synthesis of cAMP and the expression of protein kinase A. This causes the levels of intracellular calcium to drop, which in turn prevents the relaxation of smooth muscles, especially the bronchial smooth muscles. Therefore, by lessening the relaxation of airway smooth muscles, beta 2 blockers should not be used in patients with airway diseases such as asthma and chronic obstructive pulmonary disease (COPD) to avoid exacerbation in those medical conditions.

== Adverse Effects ==
=== Selectivity ===
Selectivity, or “binding selectivity”, describes how a ligand may bind more preferentially to one receptor than another. Selectivity can also describe how an agonist or antagonist binds more preferentially to one target receptor than another. Higher selectivity is associated with less off-target binding, which is binding between drug molecules and receptors other than target receptors. Therefore, non-selective adrenergic blockers can cause various adverse effects as they can also exert actions on non-target receptors, such as non-selective alpha blockers and beta blockers.

==== Non-selective alpha blockers ====
Non-selective alpha blockers have the potential to cause hypotension, weakness, tachycardia, and tremor. The simultaneous suppression of alpha 1 and alpha 2 receptors is responsible for these adverse effects. Alpha 1 receptor blockade, which results in vascular smooth muscle relaxation and consequent vasodilation, is the cause of hypotension. The occurrence of greater release of norepinephrine when numerous alpha 2 receptors are antagonised is what causes the remaining side effects. When non-selective alpha blockers are used, norepinephrine cannot bind to alpha 1 or alpha 2 receptors. As a result, activation of beta receptors occurs upon norepinephrine binding due to the spillover of excessive amounts of norepinephrine, resulting in tremors and tachycardia.

==== Selective alpha 1 blockers ====
Due to their influence on the autonomic response to systemic changes, including a sudden drop in blood pressure, selective alpha 1 blockers can have adverse effects. Around 10-20% of patients experience asthenia, dizziness, faintness, and syncope as common side effects. Additionally, there are a few rare adverse effects including priapism, urinary incontinence, palpitations, headaches, and sleepiness. The first-dose reaction can also result in tachycardia and orthostatic hypotension, which is characterised by a feeling of extreme dizziness that gets worse with an upright posture. Intravascular volume reduction, or concomitant use of other antihypertensive drugs can also lead to reflex tachycardia and orthostatic hypotension.

orthostatic hypotension (postural hypotension) demonstration

Selective alpha 2 blockers

The possibility for selective alpha 2 blockers to interact with non-target receptors, such as 5-HT serotonin receptors, can result in adverse effects, including weight gain and reduced movement due to serotonin receptor antagonism. Alpha 2 blockers are rarely utilised in clinical practice because of their substantial off-target binding and associated risks.

Non-selective beta blockers

Non-selective beta blockers can cause a range of adverse effects, including bradycardia, hypotension, fatigue, dizziness, nausea, and constipation. In some cases, exacerbation of asthma or COPD, and erectile dysfunction are also reported. For examples, certain non-selective beta blockers, such as carvedilol, can cause edema, and sotalol can block potassium channels in the heart, leading to QT prolongation and an increased risk of torsades de pointes.

==== Selective beta 1 blockers ====
Selective beta 1 blockers have been shown to have an array of cardiac common side effects, comprising bradycardia, reduced exercise tolerance, hypotension, atrioventricular block, and heart failure. Regarding non-cardiac side effects, they can cause nausea, headache, fatigue, dry mouth, and dry eyes. In rare cases, confusion, memory loss, and sexual dysfunction are reported. Additionally, beta 1 blockers can mask hypoglycaemia-induced tachycardia in diabetic patients, potentially leading to hypoglycaemic unawareness and subsequent complications if hypoglycaemia is not treated in a timely manner. Beta 1 blockers can also mask catecholamine-triggered neurogenic hypoglycaemic symptoms like tremors and palpitations. Since prolonged hypoglycaemia can cause acute brain damage, it is crucial to monitor and treat this condition promptly.

==== Selective beta 2 blockers ====
Selective beta 2 blockers impede the activity of beta 2 adrenergic receptors that are mainly situated in the airway smooth muscle of the lungs. By inhibiting the beta 2 receptor-mediated smooth muscle relaxation, beta 2 blockers narrow airways and blood vessels. This can lead to various adverse effects such as bronchospasm, tachycardia, arrhythmia, hypertension, and subcutaneous ischemia. Other possible adverse effects include the Raynaud phenomenon, hypoglycaemia during exercise, muscle cramps, an increase in airway resistance and symptoms related to bradycardia.

== Contraindications ==
=== Alpha 1 blockers ===
Alpha 1 blockers should not be used in those with a history of orthostatic hypotension, and those using calcium channel blockers or phosphodiesterase inhibitors, as they may intensify the hypotensive effect. They are also contraindicated in people with heart failure as they increase blood volume and put more stress on the heart.

=== Alpha 2 blockers ===
There is limited information about the contraindication of alpha 2 blockers, since it has limited clinical uses.

=== Beta 1 blockers ===
Beta 1 blockers are contraindicated in people with complete or second-degree heart block or recent history of fluid retention without using diuretics. Additionally, beta 1 blockers can affect beta 2 receptors, particularly at high doses, and hence should not be administered to patients with peripheral vascular disease or diabetes mellitus as they may cause vasoconstriction or a delayed hypoglycaemic response, respectively. While some studies suggest that there are minimal differences in side effects between asthma patients and non-asthma patients, beta 1 blockers are generally avoided in patients with asthma or chronic obstructive pulmonary disease due to their potential to block beta 2 receptors, particularly at high doses.

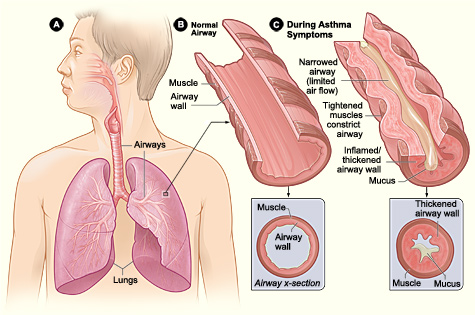
Presentations of asthma

=== Beta 2 blockers ===
Patients with asthma or chronic obstructive pulmonary disease should refrain from using beta 2 blockers since they can cause bronchoconstriction, exacerbating the conditions. Additionally, it potentially increases the risk of hypoglycaemic comas in diabetic patients.
