= Philippe Ascher =

French biologist (1936–2022)

- Born: 28 July 1936; Commercy, France
- Died: 4 October 2022 (aged 86)
- Citizenship: France
- Education: École normale supérieure
- Spouse: JacSue Kehoe (m. 1967; died 2019)
- Awards: Légion d'honneur (1990); Richard Lounsbery Award (1992)
- Scientific career
- Fields: Neuroscience
- Workplaces: CNRS

Philippe Ascher (28 July 1936 – 4 October 2022) was a French neuroscientist who was professor emeritus at the Université Paris Diderot. He devoted his research mainly to the characterization of cholinergic and glutamatergic neurotransmitter receptors. He was a corresponding member of the French Academy of Sciences since 1990.

== Biography ==
=== Education ===
Ascher was a student at the École normale supérieure from 1955 to 1959 and passed the Agrégation of biology in his final year, a highly competitive postgraduate examination which serves as a national ranking of students. Then he devoted his thesis to a problem of organization of nerves (the analysis of the circuits involved in the startle reaction of the anaesthetized cat to chloralose). He became a Doctor of Science in 1965.

=== Career ===
Philippe Ascher was interested in the ionic mechanisms associated with the action of neurotransmitters. On Aplysian neurons, he studied the inhibitory and excitatory effects of dopamine, and the rapid excitatory actions of acetylcholine. In the study of mammalian neurons, he was a highly influential and key contributor to the early characterization of L-glutamate receptors, particularly those activated by N-methyl-D-aspartic acid (NMDA receptors). In 1984, together with Linda Nowak, he discovered the role magnesium ions play in the functioning of these receptors. In 1987, Jon Johnson and Ascher discovered the modulating role of glycine in gating NMDA receptor channels. He later studied the role of NMDA receptors in the plasticity of cerebellar synapses.

In 1965 he met a post-doctoral student named JacSue Kehoe, whom he married in 1967 and with whom he had a scientific collaboration throughout his career.

In 1971 at the École normale supérieure (ENS), he founded the Neurobiology Laboratory, of which he was director until 2001. Then in 1992, still at the ENS, he succeeded Pierre Joliot as head of the Biology Department (until 1999).

In 1992 he won the Richard Lounsbery Award jointly with Henri Korn for "their discoveries of the mechanisms of synaptic transmission. Philippe Ascher furthered knowledge regarding the properties of glutamate receptors which play an important role in trials, and Henri Korn brought to light the elementary liberation of neurotransmitter in quanta form in the central nervous system of vertebrates."

Ascher's later research focused on a synapse in the spinal cord that uses both acetylcholine and glutamate.

In 2003, having reached official retirement age with his wife JacSue, he joined Alain Marty who heads the Laboratory of Cerebral Physiology at the University of Paris-Descartes. Since 2019, he has been Professor Emeritus at the SPPIN laboratory (Saint-Pères Paris Institute for Neurosciences) of the French National Centre for Scientific Research, also at the University of Paris-Descartes.

=== Personal life ===
Ascher married in 1967 the American researcher JacSue Kehoe (died in 2019) with whom he had two sons. He died on 4 October 2022, at the age of 86.

== Awards and honours ==
=== Diplomas, titles and awards ===
- 1965: PhD Thesis
- 1992: Richard-Lounsbery Award from the National Academy of Sciences and the French Academy of Sciences

=== Extra-academic distinctions ===
- 1989: elected to the pan-European Academy of Humanities, Letters, Law, and Sciences Academia Europaea (physiology and neuroscience section)
- 1990: Knight of the Legion of Honor
- 1990: Elected correspondent of the French Academy of Sciences (Molecular and Cellular Biology, Genomics Section)
