= Arul Chinnaiyan =

Indian scientist, medical researcher

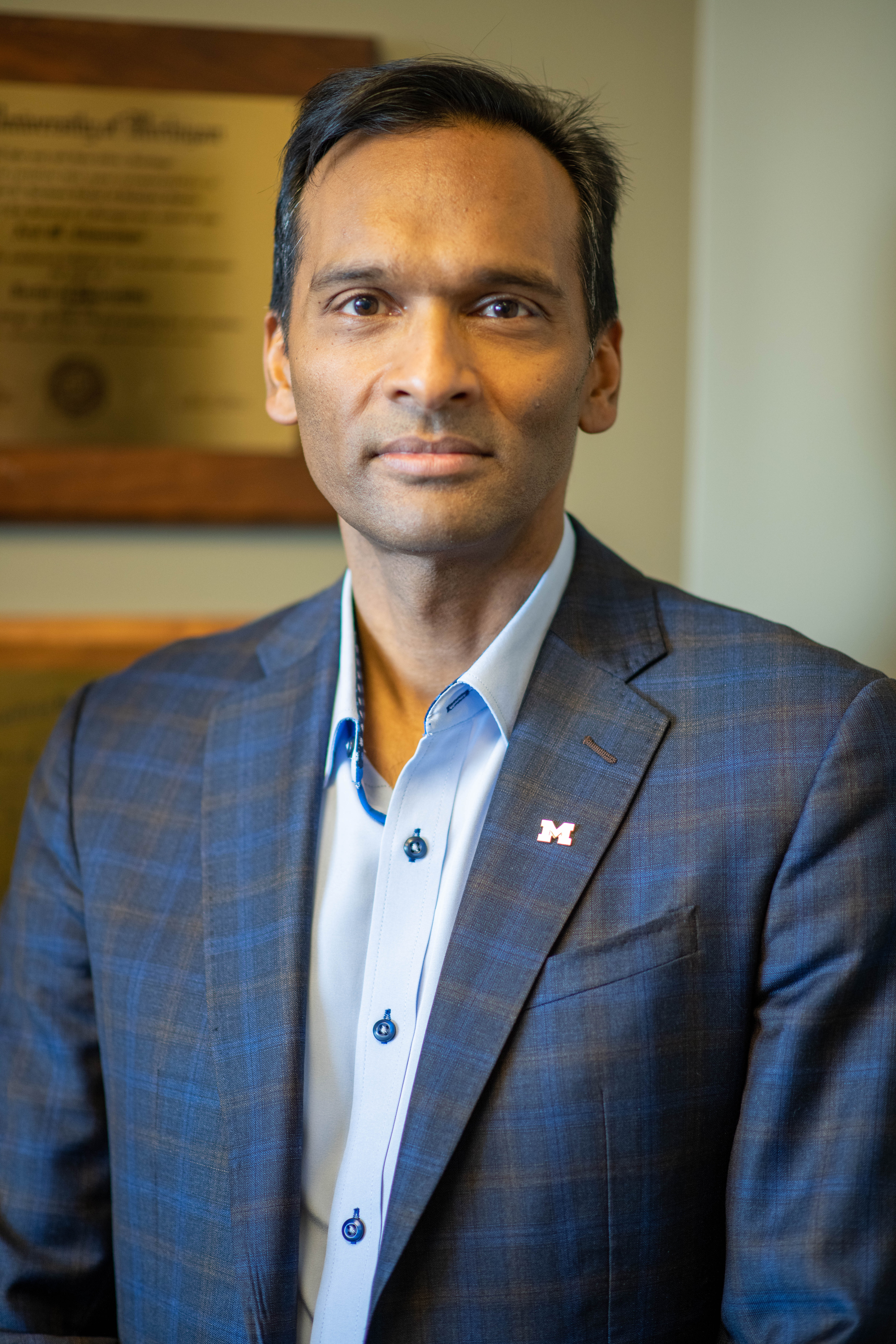
- Education: University of Michigan Medical School
- Known for: Cancer Research
- Scientific career
- Workplaces: University of Michigan Medical School, Howard Hughes Medical Institute

Arul M. Chinnaiyan is the S.P. Hicks Endowed Professor of Pathology, a Professor of Urology, and the Director of the Michigan Center for Translational Pathology at the University of Michigan Medical School. He is also a Howard Hughes Medical Institute Investigator and an American Cancer Society Research Professor.

Arul Chinnaiyan received both PhD and MD degrees at the University of Michigan Medical School in 1999. He is a cancer researcher and the recipient of the 28th annual American Association for Cancer Research Award for Outstanding Achievement in Cancer Research at the annual meeting of the AACR in April 2008 in San Diego. He was also the leader of a group of scientists who received the inaugural 2007 American Association for Cancer Research "Team Science" Award for their discovery of gene fusions in prostate cancer.

Arul Chinnaiyan received a number of other awards and prizes, including the Burroughs Wellcome Fund Clinical Scientist Award in Translational Research and the Ramzi Cotran Young Investigator Award from the United States and Canadian Academy of Pathology. He is an elected member of the American Society for Clinical Investigation, the Association of American Physicians, the American Academy of Arts and Sciences, the National Academy of Medicine, and the National Academy of Sciences. He received the 2022 Sjöberg Prize and was jointly awarded the Harrington Prize for Innovation in Medicine alongside Charles L. Sawyers.

He is a member of the editorial boards for Oncogene and Cancer Discovery, and serves on the advisory board of Cancer Cell, among other journals.

== Research and discovery ==
Arul Chinnaiyan's research focuses on the molecular profiling of cancer to identify novel diagnostic markers and therapeutic targets. In 2005, his group discovered recurrent TMPRSS2-ETS gene fusions in prostate cancer using a bioinformatic outlier-analysis method. This study was the first to establish gene fusions, previously believed to be confined to hematological malignancies, as oncogenic drivers in solid tumors. The TMPRSS2-ERG gene fusion has been incorporated into the 18-gene MyProstateScore 2.0 urine biomarker test for detection of clinically significant prostate cancer.

Chinnaiyan developed the MI-ONCOSEQ program at the University of Michigan in 2011, one of the first clinical sequencing programs. MI-ONCOSEQ employs DNA and RNA sequencing to identify actionable mutations in advanced cancer patients and combines this data with clinical information to tailor treatment strategies. The MI-ONCOSEQ program has also helped reveal key insights into cancer biology, including the mutational landscape of metastatic castration-resistant prostate cancer (mCRPC), the CDK12-mutant subtype of mCRPC, distinct classes of FOXA1 alterations in mCRPC, activating ESR1 mutations in endocrine-resistant breast cancer, FGFR fusions in diverse solid tumors, cancer-related long non-coding RNAs, and circular RNAs.

Chinnaiyan's research has identified therapeutically targetable epigenetic regulators and cofactors of transcription factor-driven oncogenesis, with a focus on proteins involved in driving androgen receptor activity in prostate cancer. These include BET bromodomain proteins, the SWI/SNF chromatin remodeling complex, p300/CBP histone acetyltransferases, and NSD2 methyltransferase.

His team has also defined the lipid kinase PIKfyve as a therapeutic target in multiple malignancies, including prostate cancer, pancreatic cancer, and gastroenteropancreatic neuroendocrine tumors.

== Publications ==
Partial list:

- Tomlins SA, Rhodes DR, Perner S, Dhanasekaran SM, Mehra R, Sun XW, Varambally S, Cao X, Tchinda J, Kuefer R, Lee C, Montie JE, Shah RB, Pienta KJ, Rubin MA, Chinnaiyan AM (2005). "Recurrent fusion of TMPRSS2 and ETS transcription factor genes in prostate cancer". Science. 310 (5748): 644–8. Bibcode:2005Sci...310..644T. doi:10.1126/science.1117679. PMID 16254181.
- Roychowdhury S, Iyer MK, Robinson DR, Lonigro RJ, Wu YM, Cao X, Kalyana-Sundaram S, Sam L, Balbin OA, Quist MJ, Barrette T, Everett J, Siddiqui J, Kunju LP, Navone N, Araujo JC, Troncoso P, Logothetis CJ, Innis JW, Smith DC, Lao CD, Kim SY, Roberts JS, Gruber SB, Pienta KJ, Talpaz M, Chinnaiyan AM (2011). "Personalized oncology through integrative high-throughput sequencing: a pilot study". Sci Transl Med. 3 (111): 111ra121. doi:10.1126/scitranslmed.3003161. PMC 3476478. PMID 22133722.
- Iyer MK, Niknafs YS, Malik R, Singhal U, Sahu A, Hosono Y, Barrette TR, Prensner JR, Evans JR, Zhao S, Poliakov A, Cao X, Dhanasekaran SM, Wu YM, Robinson DR, Beer DG, Feng FY, Iyer HK, Chinnaiyan AM (2015). "The landscape of long noncoding RNAs in the human transcriptome". Nat Genet. 47 (3): 199–208. Bibcode:2015NaGen..47..199I. doi:10.1038/ng.3192. PMC 4417758. PMID 25599403.
- Robinson D, Van Allen EM, Wu YM, Schultz N, Lonigro RJ, Mosquera JM, Montgomery B, Taplin ME, Pritchard CC, Attard G, Beltran H, Abida W, Bradley RK, Vinson J, Cao X, Vats P, Kunju LP, Hussain M, Feng FY, Tomlins SA, Cooney KA, Smith DC, Brennan C, Siddiqui J, Mehra R, Chen Y, Rathkopf DE, Morris MJ, Solomon SB, Durack JC, Reuter VE, Gopalan A, Gao J, Loda M, Lis RT, Bowden M, Balk SP, Gaviola G, Sougnez C, Gupta M, Yu EY, Mostaghel EA, Cheng HH, Mulcahy H, True LD, Plymate SR, Dvinge H, Ferraldeschi R, Flohr P, Miranda S, Zafeiriou Z, Tunariu N, Mateo J, Perez-Lopez R, Demichelis F, Robinson BD, Schiffman M, Nanus DM, Tagawa ST, Sigaras A, Eng KW, Elemento O, Sboner A, Heath EI, Scher HI, Pienta KJ, Kantoff P, de Bono JS, Rubin MA, Nelson PS, Garraway LA, Sawyers CL, Chinnaiyan AM (2015). "Integrative clinical genomics of advanced prostate cancer". Cell. 161 (5): 1215–1228. doi:10.1016/j.cell.2015.05.001. PMC 4484602. PMID 26000489.
- Robinson DR, Wu YM, Lonigro RJ, Vats P, Cobain E, Everett J, Cao X, Rabban E, Kumar-Sinha C, Raymond V, Schuetze S, Alva A, Siddiqui J, Chugh R, Worden F, Zalupski MM, Innis J, Mody RJ, Tomlins SA, Lucas D, Baker LH, Ramnath N, Schott AF, Hayes DF, Vijai J, Offit K, Stoffel EM, Roberts JS, Smith DC, Kunju LP, Talpaz M, Cieslik M, Chinnaiyan AM (2017). "Integrative clinical genomics of metastatic cancer". Nature. 548 (7667): 297–303. Bibcode:2017Natur.548..297R. doi:10.1038/nature23306. PMC 5995337. PMID 28783718.
- Wu YM, Cieslik M, Lonigro RJ, Vats P, Reimers MA, Cao X, Ning Y, Wang L, Kunju LP, de Sarkar N, Heath EI, Chou J, Feng FY, Nelson PS, de Bono JS, Zou W, Montgomery B, Alva A, Robinson DR, Chinnaiyan AM (2018). "Inactivation of CDK12 Delineates a Distinct Immunogenic Class of Advanced Prostate Cancer". Cell. 173 (7): 1770–1782.e14. doi:10.1016/j.cell.2018.04.034. PMC 6084431. PMID 29906450.
- Parolia A, Cieslik M, Chu SC, Xiao L, Ouchi T, Zhang Y, Wang X, Vats P, Cao X, Pitchiaya S, Su F, Wang R, Feng FY, Wu YM, Lonigro RJ, Robinson DR, Chinnaiyan AM (2019). "Distinct structural classes of activating FOXA1 alterations in advanced prostate cancer". Nature. 571 (7765): 413–418. Bibcode:2019Natur.571..413P. doi:10.1038/s41586-019-1347-4. PMC 6661908. PMID 31243372.
- Xiao L, Parolia A, Qiao Y, Bawa P, Eyunni S, Mannan R, Carson SE, Chang Y, Wang X, Zhang Y, Vo JN, Kregel S, Simko SA, Delekta AD, Jaber M, Zheng H, Apel IJ, McMurry L, Su F, Wang R, Zelenka-Wang S, Sasmal S, Khare L, Mukherjee S, Abbineni C, Aithal K, Bhakta MS, Ghurye J, Cao X, Navone NM, Nesvizhskii AI, Mehra R, Vaishampayan U, Blanchette M, Wang Y, Samajdar S, Ramachandra M, Chinnaiyan AM (2022). "Targeting SWI/SNF ATPases in enhancer-addicted prostate cancer". Nature. 601 (7893): 434–439. Bibcode:2022Natur.601..434X. doi:10.1038/s41586-021-04246-z. PMC 8770127. PMID 34937944.
- Tosoian JJ, Zhang Y, Xiao L, Xie C, Samora NL, Niknafs YS, Chopra Z, Siddiqui J, Zheng H, Herron G, Vaishampayan N, Robinson HS, Arivoli K, Trock BJ, Ross AE, Morgan TM, Palapattu GS, Salami SS, Kunju LP, Tomlins SA, Sokoll LJ, Chan DW, Srivastava S, Feng Z, Sanda MG, Zheng Y, Wei JT, Chinnaiyan AM (2024). "Development and Validation of an 18-Gene Urine Test for High-Grade Prostate Cancer". JAMA Oncol. 10 (6): 726–736. doi:10.1001/jamaoncol.2024.0455. PMC 11190811. PMID 38635241.
- Cheng C, Hu J, Mannan R, He T, Bhattacharyya R, Magnuson B, Wisniewski JP, Peters S, Karim SA, MacLean DJ, Karaburk H, Zhang L, Rossiter NJ, Zheng Y, Xiao L, Li C, Awad D, Mahapatra S, Bao Y, Zhang Y, Cao X, Wang Z, Mehra R, Morlacchi P, Sahai V, Pasca di Magliano M, Shah YM, Weisman LS, Morton JP, Ding K, Qiao Y, Lyssiotis CA, Chinnaiyan AM (2025). "Targeting PIKfyve-driven lipid metabolism in pancreatic cancer". Nature. 642 (8068): 776–84. Bibcode:2025Natur.642..776C. doi:10.1038/s41586-025-08917-z. PMC 12176661. PMID 40269157.
