= Carlos Caldas =

Carlos Caldas FMedSci
- Born: Carlos Manuel Simão da Silva Caldas; 27 June 1960 (age 66)
- Education: University of Lisbon Medical School
- Awards: Fellow of the Academy of Medical Sciences
- Scientific career
- Workplaces: University of Cambridge Addenbrooke's Hospital; Robinson College, Cambridge
- Website: https://www.oncology.cam.ac.uk/directory/c-caldas

Carlos Caldas FMedSci is a clinician scientist, professor in the Department of Immunology and Cancer Research, Faculty of Medicine at the Hebrew University of Jerusalem, and professor of cancer medicine at the University of Cambridge. He is an honorary consultant medical oncologist at Addenbrooke's Hospital and was the founding director of the Cambridge Breast Cancer Research Unit. He is a fellow of Robinson College, Cambridge and an emeritus senior investigator at the National Institute for Health Research (NIHR).

== Education ==
Caldas graduated from the University of Lisbon Medical School before training in internal medicine in University of Texas Southwestern, Dallas and medical oncology at Johns Hopkins Hospital, Baltimore. He then moved to the Institute of Cancer Research, London to complete a research fellowship.

== Research and career ==
Caldas' research focuses on the functional genomics of breast cancer. Caldas led the METABRIC (Molecular Taxonomy of Breast Cancer International Consortium) study, analysing the genome and transcriptome of tumours from nearly 2,000 women and comparing this with long-term clinical information including survival, age and diagnosis. The METABRIC study concluded that breast cancer was at least ten different subtypes, characterised by distinct genomic drivers. In 2019, the team published research showing the subtype a women's breast cancer is initially placed in could predict the likelihood of the tumour returning or metastasising over the next 20 years.

Caldas leads the Personalised Breast Cancer Programme in Cambridge, where woman diagnosed with breast cancer have a sample of their tumour and blood sent for DNA and RNA sequencing. The sequencing results help determine the best course of treatment for patients and can reveal if their tumour is developing resistance to treatment.

== Awards and honours ==
- Academy of Medical Sciences Fellow, 2004
- European Academy of Cancer Sciences Fellow, 2010
- EMBO member, 2015
- European Society for Medical Oncology Hamilton Fairley Award, 2016
- European Society of Human Genetics ESHG Award Laureate, 2021
- Susan G. Komen Brinker Award for Scientific Distinction in Basic Science, 2021
- 51st Fondation ARC Leopold Griffuel Prize, 2023
