= Catherine J. Wu =

American physician-scientist

- Born: New York City, US

Academic background
- Education: BS, Harvard College; MD, Stanford University School of Medicine

Academic work
- Institutions: Dana–Farber Cancer Institute; Brigham and Women's Hospital
- Main interests: Chronic lymphocytic leukemia; Cancer
- Website: wulab.dfci.harvard.edu

Catherine J. Wu is an American physician-scientist who studies oncology. She is a Professor of Medicine and Chief of Division of Stem Cell Transplantation and Cellular Therapies at the Dana–Farber Cancer Institute. Her research focuses on longitudinal studies of patients with chronic lymphocytic leukemia (CLL).

== Early life and education ==
Wu was born in New York City but her family moved to Setauket, New York when she was in grade school. Growing up, she attended Ward Melville High School. She earned her Bachelor of Science degree in Biochemistry (magna cum laude) from Harvard and her Medical degree from Stanford University School of Medicine. Upon completing her medical degree, Wu was trained in internal medicine at Brigham and Women's Hospital and completed her medical fellowship in oncology and hematology at the Dana–Farber Cancer Institute.

== Career ==
In 2000, Wu joined the Dana-Farber faculty and began her independent research program in 2005.

In 2011, Wu was the recipient of a Stand Up To Cancer Innovative Research Grant for her project "Coupled Genetic and Functional Dissection of Chronic Lymphocytic Leukemia." Using this grant, she identified mutations in the splicing factor SF3B1 connected to the development of chronic lymphocytic leukaemia (CLL). The following year, Wu continued to lead studies on clonal heterogeneity and clonal evolution of CLL and was subsequently elected to the American Society for Clinical Investigation. Wu later led a study analyzing genetic material in CLL and normal tissue of over 500 patients. Her research team identified numerous genetic abnormalities that had the ability to drive leukemia, including RPS15 and IKZF3 which had never before been linked to human cancer.

In 2019, Wu continued her research on patients with chronic lymphocytic leukaemia and led a research study which collaborated with scientists at the Broad Institute, Massachusetts General Hospital, and the University of Washington. They found that genetic changes that occur very early in chronic lymphocytic leukaemia development directly influenced the growth pattern the CLL cells would ultimately take. As a result of her research, she was elected a Member of the National Academy of Medicine. Wu later led a study which uncovered why some patients become resistant to Venclexta, a Leukemia drug. Her research team used leukemia samples from before treatment with venetoclax and following their resistance. They then analyzed the tissue looking for genomic differences in the before and after relapse samples. The results of the analysis were lacking so they performed a large-scale loss-of-function screen to see the effect on other genes. Through this screening, they found that resistant cells make too much MCL1. Using a similar approach, Wu also studies how to implement personalized cancer vaccines by identifying neoantigen targets created by a patient's tumor. In 2023, Wu was elected a fellow of the American Association for Cancer Research.

In 2024, Wu received the Sjöberg Prize from the Royal Swedish Academy of Sciences for her efforts in cancer vaccine research. Through 2024, she worked with Toni Choueiri to oversee phase 1 of a clinical trial to test the effectiveness of personalized cancer vaccines on kidney cancer. Their results found that neoantigen-derived personalized cancer vaccines were capable of targeting key driver mutations in kidney cancer, which can then induce anti-cancer immunity. All nine of their clinical trial patients generated a successful anti-cancer immune response after they received the vaccine.
