= André Nussenzweig =

Molecular biologist

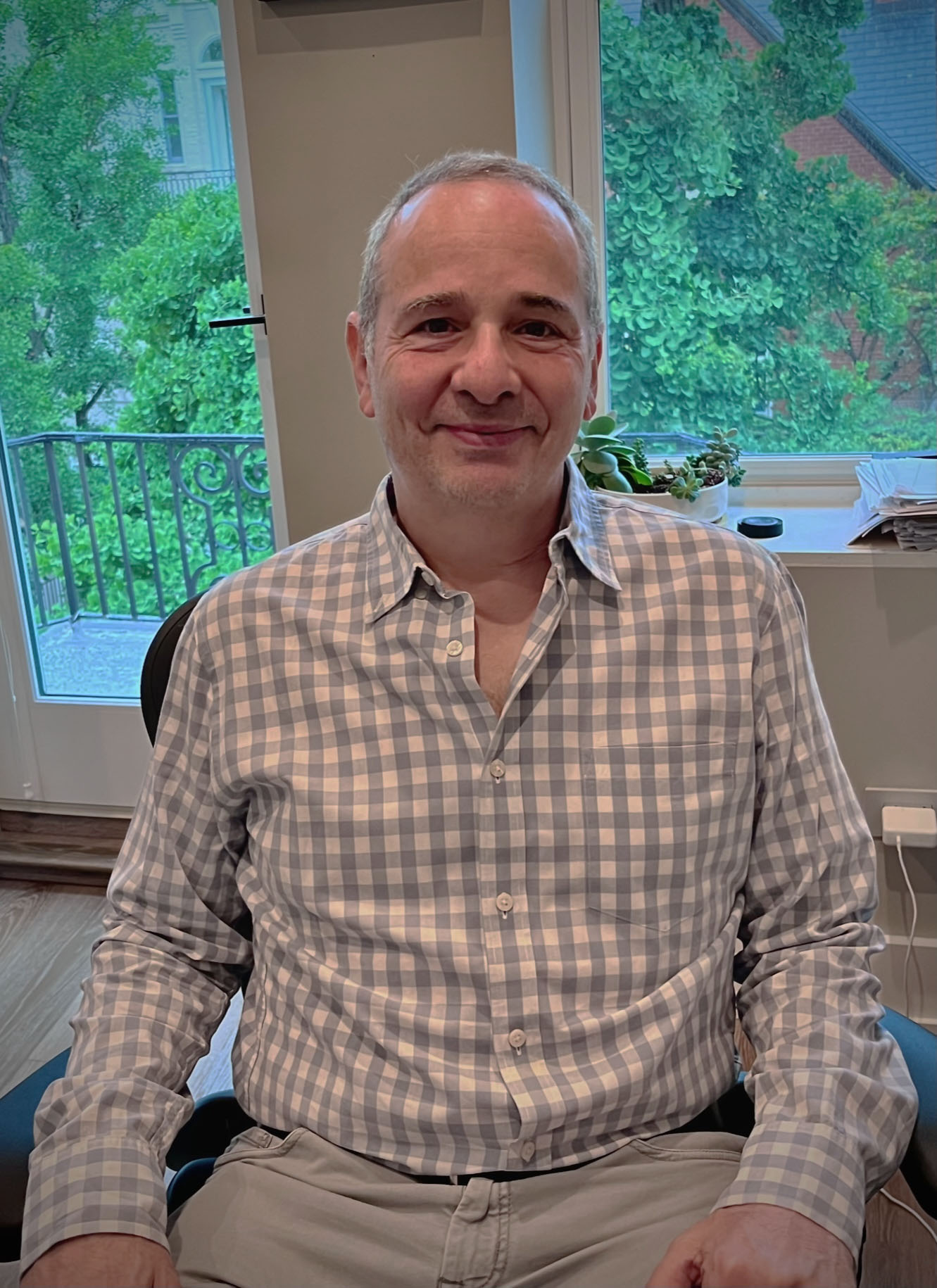
- Born: October 25, 1960 (age 65)
- Education: Yale University (Ph.D.); New York University (B.A.)
- Awards: Arthur S. Flemming Award (2007); European Molecular Biology Organization(2013); NIH Distinguished Investigator (2016); Basser Global Prize for BRCA Research (2021); National Academy of Medicine (2019); American Academy of Arts and Sciences (2023); National Academy of Sciences (2023); Environmental Mutagenesis and Genomics Society Professional Award (2024); HHS Career Achievement Award (2024)
- Scientific career
- Fields: DNA repair; cancer
- Workplaces: National Institutes of Health

André Nussenzweig (born October 25, 1960) is an American molecular biologist (former physicist). He studies the mechanisms that maintain genomic stability and prevent cancer. He is a distinguished investigator and chief of the Laboratory of Genome Integrity within the Center for Cancer Research at the National Cancer Institute. He is a member of the US National Academy of Medicine, the US National Academy of Sciences and American Academy of Arts and Sciences.

== Early life ==
He is the youngest son of Victor and Ruth Nussenzweig who worked on the development of malaria vaccines André Nussenzweig did his undergraduate studies in physics at New York University, and subsequently obtained a Ph.D. in physics at Yale University in 1989.

== Career ==
He worked two years in Serge Haroche's laboratory as a postdoctoral fellow at the Ecole Normale Superieure in Paris, France. In 1992, he began research on DNA repair in the Department of Medical Physics at Memorial Sloan-Kettering Cancer Center. There, he established a long-standing collaboration with his brother Michel C. Nussenzweig at Rockefeller University, working on immunoglobulin class-switch recombination. In 1998, he established an independent research group within the Experimental Immunology Branch at the National Cancer Institute at the National Institutes of Health in Bethesda Maryland. In 2011, he started his own department at the National Cancer Institute named the Laboratory of Genome Integrity. His research provides insight into various mutagenic sources, risk factors, and mechanisms underlying cancer.

== Personal life ==
Nussenzweig lives in Washington DC.

== Recognition ==
Partial list:

- Ellison Medical Foundation Senior Scholar in Aging
- 2007 - the Arthur S. Flemming Award
- 2016 - NIH Distinguished Investigator
- 2021 - Long School of Medicine Distinguished Scholar Award
- 2021 - the Basser Global Prize for BRCA Research
- 2024 - Leopold Griffuel Prize for Fundamental Research

Environmental Mutagenesis and Genomics Society Professional Award

- 2024 - HHS Career Achievement Award
- 2024 - Bert and Natalie Vallee Award in Biomedical Science

=== Organizations ===
- Scientific Advisory Committee of Stand Up To Cancer
- European Molecular Biology Organization
- U.S. National Academy of Medicine
- U.S. National Academy of Sciences
- American Academy of Arts and Sciences
