= Toni Choueiri =

American medical oncologist

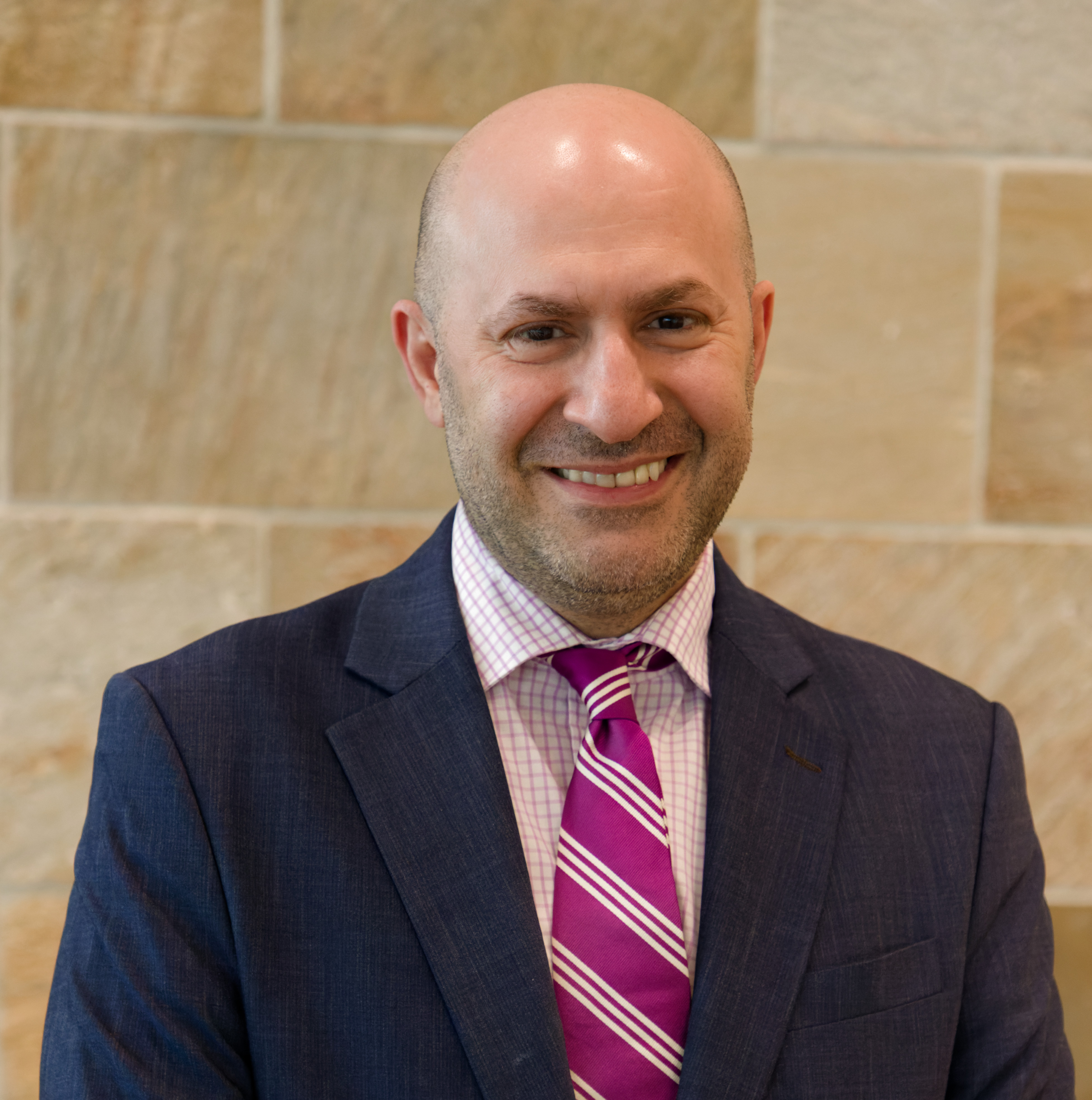
- Choueiri in 2025
- Born: Beirut, Lebanon

Academic background
- Education: MD, Saint Joseph University Residency/Fellowship, Cleveland Clinic

Academic work
- Institutions: Dana–Farber Cancer Institute

Toni K. Choueiri is a Lebanese American medical oncologist and researcher. He is the Jerome and Nancy Kohlberg Professor of Medicine at Harvard Medical School and director of the Lank Center for Genitourinary Oncology at Dana–Farber Cancer Institute. His work has led to the establishment of several novel drugs (cabozantinib, avelumab, pazopanib and others) and prognostic factors in advanced renal cell carcinoma (RCC). Choueiri also co-established the International Metastatic RCC Database Consortium (IMDC) with Daniel Heng. His biomarker work has shed light on complex immunogenomic mechanisms contributing to response and resistance to targeted therapy and immunotherapy, as well as HIF-2α biology, rare kidney tumor subtypes and solid tumor liquid biopsy.

== Early life and education ==
Choueiri was born and raised in Beirut, Lebanon, and received his medical degree at Saint Joseph University's Faculty of Medicine. He trained at the Cleveland Clinic in Ohio after medical school and moved in 2007 to Dana–Farber Cancer Institute.

== Career ==
Choueiri collaborated with Paul L. Nguyen in 2011 to perform a meta-analysis of randomized studies involving 4,141 prostate cancer patients to examine whether androgen deprivation therapy (ADT) was associated with a higher rate of cardiovascular death. The study found no significant difference in cardiovascular mortality in patients who received ADT and those who didn't, but it could not exclude a possible increased risk of fatal cardiac events. The following year, Choueiri led an analysis showing that several new anti-cancer agents were associated with a small increase in the risk of treatment-related death.

From 2015 and for the next several years, Choueiri led the development of cabozantinib in metastatic RCC, from early phase 1 to randomized trials leading to its approval in TKI-refractory disease in 2016 and in untreated RCC patients in 2017. Choueiri also co-established the International Metastatic RCC Database Consortium (IMDC) with Daniel Heng.

In 2017, Choueiri led a study that found that patients with metastatic papillary renal cell carcinoma benefited from savolitinib, a drug that targets an abnormal genetic pathway causing cancerous growth.

The following year, Choueiri was appointed full professor of medicine at Harvard Medical School while continuing in his position as director of the Lank Center for Genitourinary Oncology. In this role, he led the development of the combination of axitinib and avelumab from phase 1 to late stage trials, leading to the combination being approved for RCC therapy in May 2019. He also collaborated with Nobel prize laureate and long-term close colleague William Kaelin Jr. on translational and clinical research involving hypoxia-inducible factor 2 alpha (HIF-2α) as a therapeutic target in clear-cell RCC.

During the COVID-19 pandemic, Choueiri worked clinical shifts caring for oncology patients with COVID-19 and led a multinational effort to identify risk factors unique to cancer patients. During the same period, he continued his kidney cancer research, including work with Matthew Freedman on liquid biopsy approaches for early detection of RCC. One such study reported high accuracy in distinguishing patients with kidney cancer from individuals without the disease using blood-based molecular profiling.

In January 2021, the Food and Drug Administration (FDA) approved nivolumab in combination with cabozantinib as the first-line treatment for advanced RCC following results from a trial led by Choueiri. He also co-led, with Robert Motzer, the development of the combination of lenvatinib plus pembrolizumab, which received FDA approval for advanced RCC in August 2021.

Later that year, Choueiri presented results from the phase 3 KEYNOTE-564 trial, which demonstrated the benefit of adjuvant pembrolizumab after nephrectomy in patients with RCC at increased risk of recurrence. The findings led to FDA approval of pembrolizumab for adjuvant treatment of RCC later in 2021.

Choueiri later led LITESPARK-005, a randomized phase 3 trial that established the HIF-2α inhibitor belzutifan as a treatment option for previously treated advanced RCC and supported its FDA approval in 2023.

In 2024, Choueiri and Dana-Farber scientist Catherine J. Wu oversaw a clinical trial evaluating personalized neoantigen vaccines in patients with kidney cancer. All nine participants developed vaccine-induced immune responses directed against tumor-associated neoantigens, supporting further investigation of personalized cancer vaccines in RCC.

In 2026, FDA approval was granted to the combination of pembrolizumab and belzutifan based on Choueiri's work combining targets and drugs from the 2018 (immune checkpoint blockers) and 2019 (HIF2 inhibitors) Nobel Prizes in Medicine and Physiology.

As a result of his research, Choueiri was inducted into the 2021 Giants of Cancer Care class and received the King Hussein Cancer Research Lifetime Achievement Award (International Track). In recognition of his continued efforts to combat cancer, he was awarded the Waun Ki Hong Award for Outstanding Achievement in Translational and Clinical Cancer Research in 2024.

He was also inducted as a member into the American Society for Clinical Investigation and into the Association of American Physicians in 2026. That same year, he received the KidneyCAN Hall of Fame Lifetime Achievement Award in honor of his pivotal contributions to renal cell carcinoma research.

== Personal life ==
Choueiri and his wife Sue have two children together and are soccer fans of the MLS, Bundesliga and Premier League.
