= Yang Shi =

- Education: New York University (PhD)
- Known for: Discovery of LSD1 (KDM1A); histone demethylases; epigenetic regulation
- Awards: Leopold Griffuel Prize; American Cancer Society Research Professorship; Ray Wu Award; SCBA Presidential Award;
- Honors: Member of the National Academy of Sciences; Member of the National Academy of Medicine; Fellow of the Royal Society; Member of the American Academy of Arts and Sciences;
- Scientific career
- Fields: Epigenetics; Molecular biology; Cancer research
- Workplaces: University of Oxford; Ludwig Institute for Cancer Research; Harvard Medical School; Boston Children's Hospital; Princeton University;
- Doctoral advisor: Eva Derman
- Other academic advisors: Thomas Shenk
- Website: https://www.ludwig.ox.ac.uk/team/yang-shi

Yang Shi is a molecular biologist known for work on epigenetic regulation, particularly histone and RNA methylation. He is a Member of the Ludwig Institute for Cancer Research and a professor at the University of Oxford. Shi is best known for his discovery of lysine-specific demethylase 1 (LSD1/KDM1A) in 2004, which demonstrated that histone methylation is reversible. His work has identified multiple histone demethylases and clarified their roles in gene regulation, cancer, and human disease, and has contributed to the ongoing development of epigenetic cancer therapies. He is an elected member of the National Academy of Sciences, the National Academy of Medicine, and the Royal Society, and a recipient of the Leopold Griffuel Prize.

== Career ==
Yang Shi received his PhD from New York University in 1987, where his doctoral advisor was Eva Derman. He then completed postdoctoral training in the laboratory of Thomas Shenk at Princeton University.

Shi began his independent research career at Harvard Medical School in 1991 as a tenure-track assistant professor and was promoted to full professor in the Department of Pathology in 2004. In 2009, he joined the Newborn Medicine Division at Boston Children's Hospital, where he held the Merton Bernfield Professorship. In 2018, he was appointed the inaugural C. H. Waddington Professor of Pediatrics at Harvard Medical School. In 2020, he joined the Ludwig Institute for Cancer Research at the University of Oxford.

== Contributions and Impact ==
Shi’s work has advanced understanding of epigenetic regulation through the discovery of histone and RNA-modifying enzymes and proteins that recognize histone methylation states. He is best known for identifying the first histone demethylase, LSD1 (KDM1A), in 2004, demonstrating that histone methylation is reversible. His group subsequently identified a second family of histone demethylases and contributed to the characterization of multiple demethylases and their roles in gene regulation, cancer, and human disease. His studies have also shown that LSD1 regulates tumor immunogenicity and that its inhibition can enhance responses to immune checkpoint therapies in various models and induce therapeutic differentiation, informing the ongoing development of epigenetic cancer treatments. More recently, his work on RNA methylation has revealed roles for m6A in transcriptional regulation and the DNA damage response, and identified new enzymes involved in RNA methylation.

== Awards and honors ==
- Member of the American Academy of Arts and Sciences (2016)
- Fellow of the AACR Academy (2022)
- Member of the European Molecular Biology Organization (2022)
- Member of the National Academy of Medicine (2022)
- Fellow of the Academy of Medical Sciences (2023)
- Member of the National Academy of Sciences (2024)
- Fellow of the Royal Society (2024)
- Leopold Griffuel Prize (2025)
