= André Capron =

French immunologist and parasitologist (1930–2020)

- Born: December 30, 1930; Lens, France
- Died: January 10, 2020 (aged 89)
- Education: University of Lille (M.D. 1958; L.Sc. 1959)
- Awards: Richard Lounsbery Award (1985); King Faisal Prize in Medicine (1990); Commander of the National Order of Merit (1990); Officer of the Legion of Honour (2007); Commander of the Legion of Honour (2016)
- Scientific career
- Fields: immunology parasitology
- Institutions: Lille University College of Medicine; Pasteur Institute of Lille

André Capron (30 December 1930 – 10 January 2020) was a French immunologist and parasitologist known for his work on schistosomiasis (bilharzia).

== Career ==
Capron graduated from the University of Lille as doctor of medicine (1958) with a scientific specialty (1959). His senior appointments included professor at the College of Medicine of Lille University (1970–2000), head of immunology at Lille University Hospital (1970–2000), director of the Parasite Immunology Research Center at the Pasteur Institute (1975–2001), and director of the Pasteur Institute of Lille (1994–2000).

At the national level, he served as president of the scientific committee of Inserm (the French institute for health and medical research) between 1987 and 1991, and as president of ANRS (the national society for AIDS and hepatitis research) from 1999 until 2002. Since 2001 he was a member of the scientific committee of the École normale supérieure.

Capron worked in both administrative and advisory capacities to further biomedical research in developing countries. During the 1980s he chaired the first European program on Science and Techniques for Development and served as president of the WHO Bilharziasis Program. He was also a member of the WHO Scientific Advisory Group of Experts (1987–1999) and the WHO Scientific and Technical Advisory Committee (1988–1992).

== Awards ==
In 1985 Capron won the Richard Lounsbery Award jointly with Jacques Glowinski for "their fundamental work, which has contributed to the treatment of parasitic and neurological diseases." In 1990 he received the King Faisal International Prize in Medicine with Anthony Butterworth for significant progress towards the goal of vaccines against schistosomiasis.

Capron was elected to the Institut de France in 1988 and was a member and former secretary of the French Academy of Sciences. He was also a member of the National Academy of Medicine, and an honorary member of The Royal Academy of Belgium, and honorary doctor of Brussels University and Ghent University. He was appointed Commander of the National Order of Merit in 1990, Officer of the Legion of Honour in 2007, and Commander of the Legion of Honour in 2016.
