= Benjamin L. Ebert =

American oncologist

- Born: Boston
- Education: Williams College (BA); University of Oxford (DPhil); Harvard University (MD)
- Scientific career
- Workplaces: Harvard Medical School; Dana–Farber Cancer Institute
- Thesis: Transcriptional regulation of the LDH-A and erythropoietin genes by hypoxia (1999)

Benjamin Levine Ebert is the president and CEO of Dana–Farber Cancer Institute, the Richard and Susan Smith Professor of Medicine at Harvard Medical School and director of the Dana-Farber/Harvard Cancer Center. Ebert succeeded Laurie Glimcher as president and CEO in October 2024.

== Early life and education ==
Ebert was born in Boston to parents Michael and Ellen Ebert. His father was the chair of the department of psychiatry at Vanderbilt University School of Medicine while his mother was an artist. He and his family lived in Bethesda, Maryland, and Nashville, Tennessee. While in Tennessee, Ebert was enrolled at the University School of Nashville. During high school, he also worked in the laboratory of Daryl Granner and studied gene regulation and diabetes.

Following high school, Ebert received a bachelor's degree from Williams College. As a senior, he was presented with the college's Good Citizen award for his involvement in various community projects over the years. Ebert was also elected president of the Williams juggling club and competed in cycling. In 1992, Ebert went to the University of Oxford as a Rhodes Scholar where he completed a doctorate under the mentorship of Sir Peter Ratcliffe.

Upon returning to North America, Ebert enrolled at Harvard Medical School (HMS) and worked with Frank Bunn, whom he later listed as a major reason for pursuing a career in hematology. He graduated from HMS in 1999 and then completed his internship and residency at Massachusetts General Hospital in 2001. He then went on to complete his clinical fellowship in hematology and oncology at Dana–Farber Cancer Institute (DFCI).

== Career ==
Ebert started his career as a Harvard Medical School faculty member at Brigham and Women's Hospital, where he led an independent research laboratory and practiced medicine as a hematologist/oncologist. His laboratory described the genomic landscape of adult myelodysplastic syndromes and identified RPS14 as a key gene for deletion 5q MDS. In 2011, Ebert was elected to the American Society for Clinical Investigation. In 2014, Ebert's lab found that lenalidomide, a cancer drug, targeted two proteins, IKZF1 and IKZF3, for degradation. This finding and additional studies established the mechanism of action of lenalidomide in both multiple myeloma and del(5q) MDS. An independent line of investigation characterized and defined clonal hematopoiesis of indeterminate potential (CHIP) as a precursor state for blood cancers and a risk factor for inflammatory diseases. As a result of his research, Ebert was the recipient of the 2017 William Dameshek Prize from the American Society of Hematology. He has received funding from a National Cancer Institute Outstanding Investigator Award for his research.

In 2017, Ebert moved to Dana-Farber Cancer Institute to be Chair of the Department of Medical Oncology. In 2018, Ebert, was elected a member of the National Academy of Medicine for his "contributions to understanding the genetics and biology of myeloid malignancies, to the characterization of clonal hematopoiesis, and for elucidating the mechanism of action of thalidomide and its analogs." He was named a Howard Hughes Medical Institute Investigator in 2019. He has received multiple recognitions for mentorship including the Thomas McMahon Award and the Seidman Prize from the HST Program at Harvard Medical School. Ebert has served on the Board of Directors of Break Through Cancer since 2024.

== Awards ==
- 2011 Elected to the American Society for Clinical Investigation
- 2014 Elected to the Association of American Physicians
- 2017 William Dameshek Prize from the American Society of Hematology
- 2018 Elected to the National Academy of Medicine
- 2019 Meyenberg Cancer Research Prize
- 2021 Stanley J. Korsmeyer Award
- 2021 Sjöberg Prize for Cancer Research
- 2023 Elected to the American Academy of Arts and Sciences
- 2024 Fellow of the AACR Academy
- 2025 Erasmus Hematology Prize
- 2026 Elected to the National Academy of Sciences
- 2026 Janet Rowley Basic Science Medal
