= Martin Gellert =

American molecular biologist

Martin Frank Gellert (born 5 June 1929 in Prague, Czechoslovakia) is a Czechoslovak-born American molecular biologist. He is a past president of the American Society for Biochemistry and Molecular Biology.

He is a survivor of the Holocaust.

Gellert graduated from Harvard University in 1950 with an A.B. His doctorate was completed at Columbia University in 1956.

In 1985 he won the Richard Lounsbery Award jointly with Thomas Maniatis for "their seminal contributions to our understanding of the structure and function of DNA, which were essential and fundamental to the development of recombinant DNA techniques." Gellert is an NIH Distinguished Investigator at the National Institute of Diabetes and Digestive and Kidney Diseases (NIDDK).
