= François Cuzin =

François Cuzin is a professor at the University of Nice, Sophia-Antipolis. In 1988 he won the Richard Lounsbery Award for "his original contributions in the elucidation of the mechanisms involved in malignant cell transformation, in particular, demonstration of the necessary contribution of two oncogenes."
