= Maxime Schwartz =

French molecular biologist

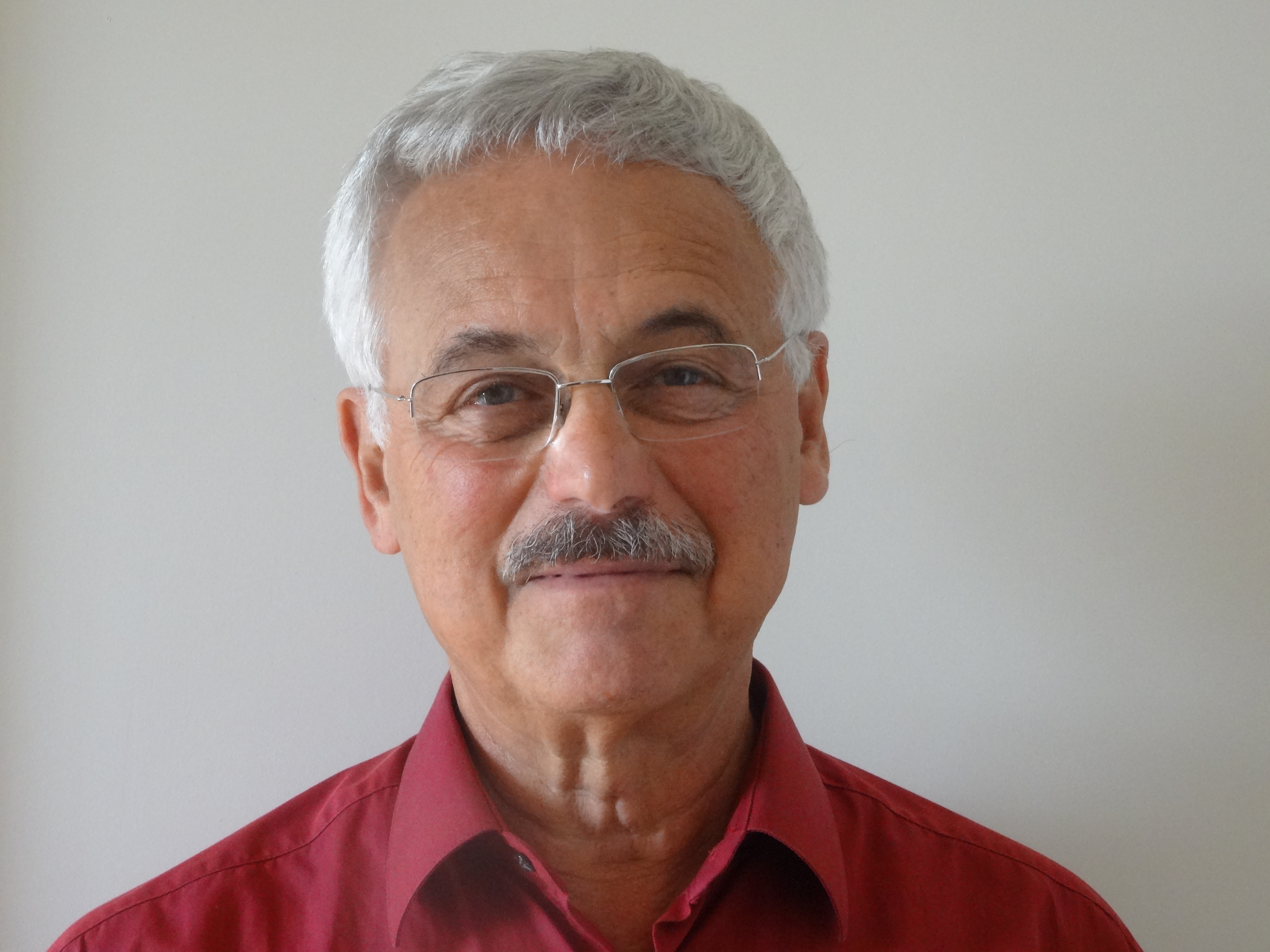
Maxime Schwartz

Maxime Simon Schwartz, born in June 1940 in Blois (Loir-et-Cher), is a French molecular biologist who has been a research director at the CNRS, a professor at the Pasteur Institute and Director General of the Pasteur Institute. He is a correspondent of the French Academy of sciences.

== Family origins ==
Maxime Schwartz was born on 1 June 1940 in Blois, Loir-et-Cher. He is the son of Daniel Schwartz (1917–2009) (X, 1937) and Yvonne Berr (1917–2001). His paternal grandparents were Anselme Schwartz, surgeon, and Claire Debré, sister of the pediatrician Robert Debré. His maternal grandparents were Raymond Berr (X, 1907), director of the Kuhlmann Establishment and Antoinette Rodrigues Ely, who died in deportation, and their daughter Hélène Berr.

With his brother Yves, he is a nephew of Laurent Schwartz and Bertrand Schwartz (X, 1939), his father's brothers.

== Formation ==
After completing his secondary education at the Lycée Janson-de-Sailly, he entered the École Polytechnique in 1959. A student at this institution until 1961, he then did his military service (1961–1962) in the Navy in Toulon, where he worked alongside Henri Laborit.

In 1962–1963, Maxime Schwartz prepared and obtained a mixed degree in physics and biology.

From 1964 to 1967, under the direction of Jacques Monod, at the Pasteur Institute, he prepared a doctorate, which he defended in June 1967. During the preparation of this doctorate he benefited from the advice of François Jacob, with whom he worked for more than thirty years.

From 1967 to 1969, as a Junior Fellow of the Harvard Society of Fellows at Harvard University, he carried out a postdoctoral internship in James Watson's laboratory at that university. He spent the last three months of 1969 at the Salk Institute, where he collaborated with Suzanne Bourgeois in the laboratory of Melvin Cohn.

== Scientific and administrative career ==
After his doctorate, Maxime Schwartz returned to the Pasteur Institute, where he remained for most of his career. He first worked there as a researcher at the CNRS, and then, from 1973, as a CNRS/Institut Pasteur dual member.

At the CNRS, he was a research professor from 1971 to 1986 and research director from 1986 to 2007.

At the Pasteur Institute, he was head of laboratory from 1973 to 1984 and then professor from 1984 to 2007.

From 1975 to 1995, he was head of the Molecular Genetics Unit at the Pasteur Institute.

From 1985 to 1987, he was deputy director (Scientific Director) of the Pasteur Institute.

From 1988 to 1999, he was Director General of the Pasteur Institute.

From 2000 to 2001, he was Head of the Cell Physiology Unit at the Pasteur Institute.

Since 2007, the year of his retirement, he has been a chargé de mission with the management of the Institut Pasteur.

From 2002 to 2006, he was Scientific Director of the French Food Safety Agency, headed by Martin Hirsch, then Pascale Briand.

On March 30, 1987, Maxime Schwartz was elected correspondent of the French Academy of sciences, in the Molecular and Cellular Biology and Genomics section.

== Distinctions ==
S.A. Waksman Gold Medal of the French Academy of sciences (1974).

Richard Lounsbery Prize of the French Academy of sciences and the National Academy of Sciences (1984).

Officier of the Ordre des Palmes Académiques

Commandeur of the Ordre National du Mérite May 2, 2017 (Officier of September 27, 1994)

Officier of the Légion d'Honneur

Commandeur of the Ordre du Lion (Senegal)

Commandeur of the Order of the Southern Cross (Brazil)

== Scientific work ==
Maxime Schwartz's scientific work concerns various aspects of the metabolism of a sugar, maltose, in the bacterium Escherichia coli. These have enabled him to address very general questions, such as the regulation of protein synthesis and the structure, functions and biogenesis of membrane proteins. François Jacob and Jacques Monod's work on the metabolism of another sugar, lactose, in the same bacterium led them to propose that the expression of genes encoding the enzymes necessary for the metabolism of this sugar is blocked by a repressor, a regulatory protein whose action is itself inhibited in the presence of lactose. The unblocking of the genes thus results from the inhibition of the repressor. This regulation involving a double inhibition was later to be qualified as negative. Based on his work on maltose metabolism, Maxime Schwartz was one of the first to suggest the existence of positive regulation, the expression of genes resulting from the activation of an activator. Positive regulation mechanisms subsequently proved to be extremely frequent in all living cells. The most original aspect of Maxime Schwartz's work on membrane proteins is the demonstration that one of the proteins allowing the transport of maltose through the bacterial envelope serves as a receptor for a bacterial virus, the bacteriophage lambda. It was a novel notion that virus receptors are proteins with a well-defined function for the target cell. This is now a well-established fact for many, many viruses. Maxime Schwartz has also been interested, in collaboration with the laboratory of the American Jonathan Beckwith, in the mechanisms that allow proteins to be placed in various layers of the bacterial envelope. Using genetic methods, he is helping to demonstrate that the signal sequence, located at the amino-terminal end of membrane-through proteins and defined by Gunther Blobel's group, is indeed necessary for the transport of these proteins across the cytoplasm membrane, but is not sufficient. Indeed, the inactivation by mutation of the signal sequence prevents such a protein from crossing the membrane; on the other hand the single addition of a signal sequence to the end of a cytoplasmic protein is not sufficient to make it cross the membrane.

== Management of the Pasteur Institute ==
Managing Director of the Institut Pasteur for two consecutive six-year terms, Maxime Schwartz is striving to continue the work of modernization begun by his predecessors, Jacques Monod, François Gros and Raymond Dedonder. On the Paris campus, he presided over the construction of several new buildings, including the Scientific Information Centre, financed by the bequest from the Duchess of Windsor, and undertook the renovation of most of the laboratories located in older buildings. He also continued the development of the International Network of Pasteur Institutes (which he named), upgrading the equipment of the old institutes, integrating foreign institutes such as those in St. Petersburg and Romania, building a new institute in Cambodia, and initiating the creation of a joint laboratory between the Pasteur Institute and the University of Hong Kong. At the scientific level, it promotes the application of molecular biology techniques to the study of infectious diseases, thus allowing the emergence of several teams of great international reputation. In addition, he works to develop and modernize relations between research and industry, presiding in particular over the creation of the first "start-ups" created by researchers from the institute. In 1994, Maxime Schwartz succeeded in getting the American government to admit that the virus isolated by the American Robert Gallo as being the AIDS virus was none other than the virus that the Pasteurian Luc Montagnier had sent him a year earlier; he thus put an end to a 10-year-old controversy involving scientific ethics as well as financial aspects.

== AFSSA Scientific Directorate ==
With the title of Director of Laboratory Programming, Maxime Schwartz worked for 5 years as Scientific Director of the laboratories of the French Food Safety Agency (AFSSA). As such, he notably launched a European Network of Excellence, MED-VET-NET, bringing together veterinary and human medicine laboratories for the study of diseases transmitted to humans by animals. In this agency, he also chairs the "Biotechnology" expert committee whose main objective is to give opinions to public authorities on the marketing of genetically modified organisms.

== Books ==
Maxime Schwartz is author or co-author of the following books:

- 1995, avec Annick Perrot, Pasteur, des microbes au vaccin, Casterman, Paris.
- 2001, Comment les vaches sont devenues folles ? Odile Jacob, Paris.
- 2008, with François Rodhain, Des microbes ou des hommes, qui va l'emporter ? Odile Jacob, Paris.
- 2009, with Jean Castex,La Découverte du virus du SIDA. La vérité sur "l'affaire Gallo/Montagnier". Odile Jacob, Paris.
- 2013, with Annick Perrot, Pasteur et ses lieutenants. Roux, Yersin et les autres. Odile Jacob, Paris.
- 2014, with Annick Perrot, Pasteur et Koch. Un duel de géants dans le monde des microbes, Odile Jacob, Paris.
- 2016, with Annick Perrot, Le génie de Pasteur au secours des Poilus, Odile Jacob, Paris.
- 2018, with Annick Perrot, Louis Pasteur le visionnaire, Editions de La Martinière

== Documentary ==
- Maxime Schwartz and Annick Perrot, Pasteur et Koch, un duel de géants dans le monde des microbes, Arte, October 6, 2018.
