= Selectivity factor =

Antibiotic efficiency during the gene selection process

Selectivity factor is a quantifiable measure of how efficient an antibiotic is during the process of gene selection. It measures of the capacity an antibiotic to select for transfected (resistant) cells that contain a selectable marker, while killing untransfected (sensitive) cells that do not contain a selectable marker. A selectivity factor higher than 10 is optimal. This means the concentration of antibiotic is sufficient to kill untransfected cells but not toxic enough to kill transfected cells. A selectivity factor lower than 10 means the concentration of antibiotic needed for selection is too close to the toxic concentration for the transfected cells. As a result, fewer transfected cells survive and more untransfected cells survive. In this case an alternative antibiotic should be considered.

== Calculating the selectivity factor ==
The method uses a modified MTT assay. The MTT assay is a colorimetric assay used to assess cell metabolic activity. The assay is based on the reduction of yellow tetrazolium salt (MTT) by active cells to produce purple formazan crystals which accumulate in living cells. Cells are lysed, the crystals are dissolved, and the absorbance of the solution is analysed on a spectrophotometer as a measure of cell viability. In situations where the use of MTT is problematic, PI or Sytox Green screening in a fluorescence plate reader can be considered. The next step is to generate a kill curve which defines the ideal concentration of a selection antibiotic to kill untransfected cells (Fig 1A). Curves are generated for both sensitive cells and resistant cells. The half-maximal Inhibitory Concentration (IC50) can be calculated, which measures the potency of the antibiotic.

The selectivity factor is calculated as follows:

SF = IC_{5}0R/IC_{50}S whereas SF = selectivity factor; IC_{50} = half-maximal inhibitory concentration; R= resistant cells; S = sensitive cells

== Advantages of the selectivity factor ==
The selectivity factor has the following advantages: it is quantitative thus can be reported numerically using a microplate reader, it streamlines the process of generating stable cell lines (assay can be completed in 3 days), it considers both sensitive and resistant cells, and it allows comparison of the consistency and quality of antibiotics from different batches, vendors, and manufacturing methods.

== Practical uses of the selectivity factor ==
The selectivity factor can be used for the creation of stably transfected cell lines, an important tool in drug discovery, biomedical research, and biological pathway investigation. Cell line creation involves transfection (transferring the gene into the cell line), and selection (applying selective pressure in the form of an antibiotic. Transfection efficiency is dependent on cell type, cell density, vector, and transfection method. Selection efficiency depends on the capacity of the antibiotic to kill the parental cells but not the transfected cells.
