= Hugues de Thé =

French biologist (born 1959)

Hugues de Thé (2026)

Hugues de Thé (born January 18, 1959, in Marseille) is a French biologist and researcher. He is currently a hospital doctor and professor at the Collège de France, the holder of the chair of cellular and molecular oncology (2014), and a member of the French Academy of Sciences since 2011. His work, at the intersection between biology and medicine, has transformed the management of a rare form of leukaemia, which has become the paradigm for targeted cancer treatments.

== Biography and scientific work ==
Thé's father was a doctor and biologist. He spent the first years of his life in the United States. After a period in preparatory classes, he studied medicine and biological sciences in parallel, first in Lyon, then at the Necker Hospital in Paris. Successful for the competitive examination as a resident at Assistance Publique – Hôpitaux de Paris in 1984, he chose the medical research internship programme, which he did in Pierre Tiollais' laboratory at the Pasteur Institute. His thesis and post-doctoral work in this laboratory enabled him to make significant contributions to the understanding of retinoic acid signalling, in particular with the cloning of RARB and the identification of the first element of response to this hormone. Together with Laurent Degos and Anne Dejean, he then explored the basis of the clinical response of acute promyelocytic leukaemias to retinoic acid, which lead him to identify the reworking of the RARA gene in this disease and describe the PML/RARA fusion. Recruited as a researcher at Inserm in 1991, he devoted the rest of his career to understanding the leukemogenic function of this oncoprotein. After being recruited as a professor and hospital practitioner at the University of Paris 7, he was appointed head of a CNRS research unit, then CNRS/Inserm/University (molecular pathology) from 1995 to 2018. He is, or has been, a member of numerous evaluation and advisory structures in France and abroad. He is a member of the editorial boards of Cancer Research, then Cancer Discovery.

His work, directly inspired by clinical observations and carried out in collaboration with French and Chinese teams, lead to new insights into the roles of differentiation, gene expression control or nuclear organization in the pathogenesis of this disease. In particular, he will seek to understand the molecular and cellular bases of PML/RARA targeting by retinoic acid and later by arsenic. His team showed that retinoic acid and arsenic are targeted treatments that bind directly to PML/RARA and induce its degradation by the proteasome. In vivo modelling of the disease allowed him to discover that the combination of retinoic acid and arsenic is capable of eradicating the disease. These models found clinical application in treatments that can cure the vast majority of patients without the use of genotoxic chemotherapy. In addition to their medical applications, his work has opened up new perspectives in very fundamental biological fields, such as nuclear organization or protein stability control.

== Distinctions ==
Hugues de Thé has received numerous national and international awards: the Mandé Prize From the French Academy of Medecine (1996), Rosen Prize from the Fondation pour la Recherche Médicale (FRM) (1999), Mergier-Bourdeix Prize from the French Academy of sciences (2004), Griffuel Prize from the Association de recherche en Cancérologie (ARC) (2010), Claude Bernard Prize of the City of Paris (2010), the Chinese Office Science and Technology International Cooperation Prize (2011), the Ernest Beutler Award of the American Society of Hematology (2016), the Sjoberg Prize of the Royal Swedish Academy of Sciences (2018), and the Shaw Prize (2026).

He is a member of EMBO (2004) and has obtained two Advanced Grants from the European Research Council (ERC). He was named Chevalier in the Ordre national du Mérite (2001) and then in the Légion d'Honneur (2010).
