= Anne Dejean-Assémat =

French molecular biologist (born 1957)

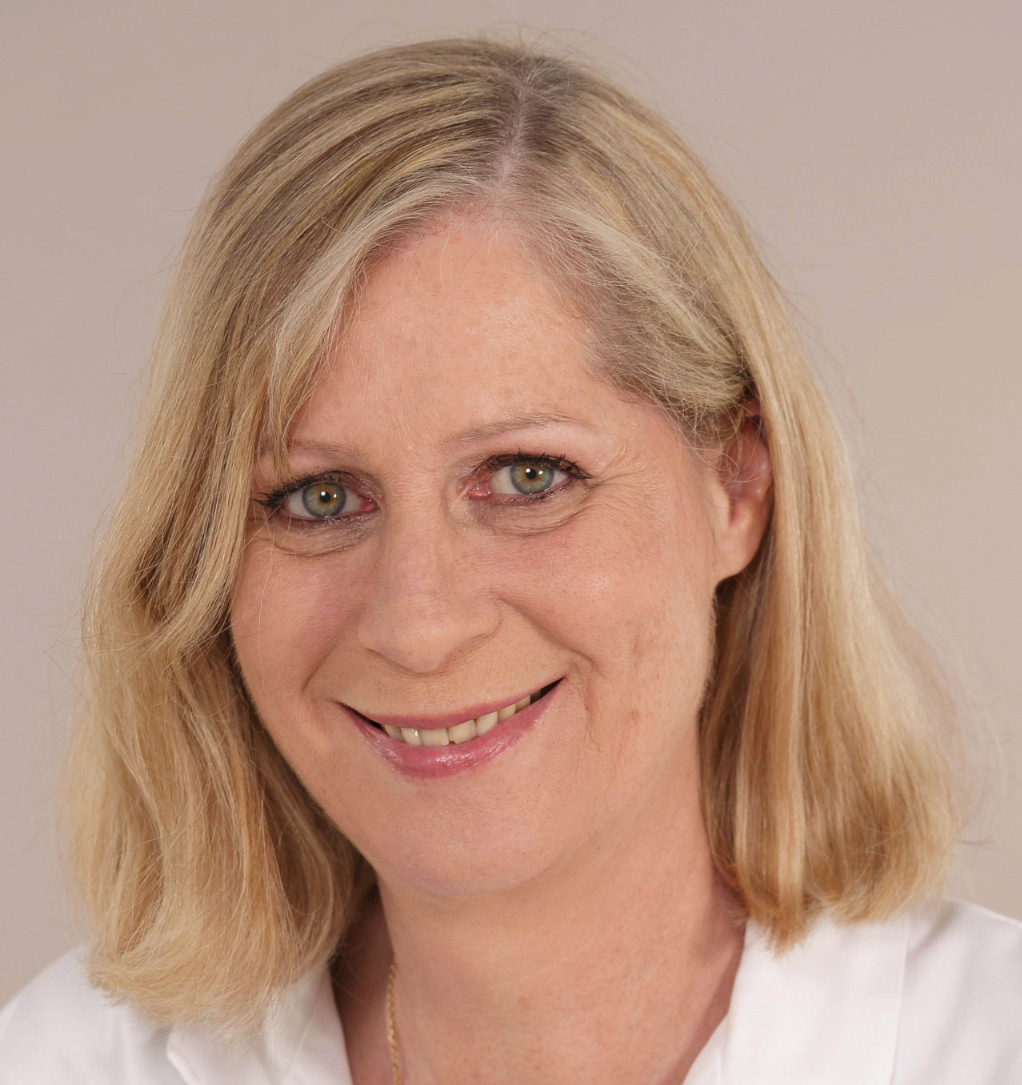
- Born: 6 January 1957 (age 69); Cholet, Pays de la Loire, France
- Education: Pierre-and-Marie-Curie University
- Employer(s): Pasteur Institute, INSERM
- Known for: Human cancers, Molecular and Cellular Biology
- Awards: Member of the French Academy of Sciences, Member of the American Academy of Arts and Science, Grand Prix INSERM, Sjöberg Prize, Shaw Prize
- Website: https://research.pasteur.fr/en/member/anne-dejean/

Anne Dejean-Assémat (born 6 January, 1957) is a French molecular biologist working on the mechanisms leading to the development of human cancers. Professor at the Pasteur Institute and Research Director at Inserm, she heads the laboratory of Nuclear Organization and Oncogenesis at the Pasteur Institute.

== Biography ==
Anne Dejean-Assémat was educated at the Pierre and Marie Curie University in Paris, graduating with a Master of Science degree in Genetics in 1980. Anne Dejean earned her PhD in 1983 and her habilitation (thèse d'état) in 1988, both from Sorbonne University (ex Pierre and Marie Curie University). She got a position at Inserm as Chargée de recherche in 1985 and was appointed head of a Pasteur Institute/Inserm laboratory in 2003. Member of EMBO, of the French Academy of Sciences and of the American Academy of Arts and Sciences, she has received the Gagna and Van Heck Prize, 2003, the Prize L'Oréal-Unesco for Women in Science, 2010, the Grand Prix Inserm, 2014 and the Sjöberg Prize, 2018.

== Scientific contributions ==
A cancer molecular biologist, Anne Dejean-Assémat has contributed several pioneering concepts in the areas of nuclear receptors and human cancers. She discovered that genes encoding the receptors for retinoic acid (RAR), the active derivative of vitamin A, are mutated in liver cancer and in a rare type of leukemia and deciphered the molecular and cellular bases for the cure of this leukemia, opening up unique perspectives for new differentiation and targeted cancer therapy leads.

She first found such a mutation in a hepatitis B virus-associated liver tumor, demonstrating that this virus, by inserting its genome into that of the hepatic cell, can disrupt neighbouring human genes and directly trigger the development of liver cancer. This discovery led Dejean-Assémat's team to clone the RARb gene and identify the first responsive element to retinoic acid. Together with Hugues de Thé, she then discovered the PML-RARa oncoprotein as the genetic defect responsible for acute promyelocytic leukemia (APL) and elucidated its oncogenic properties.

Dejean-Assémat's further work led to the characterization of the mechanisms underlying the cure of APL by retinoic acid and arsenic, a treatment developed in China and that remains the most efficient oncogene-targeted therapy described so far. She showed that therapeutic doses of retinoic acid can correct the deficient molecular response in the leukemic cells. She also demonstrated that a particular organelle, the PML Nuclear Body, is disrupted in these cells, and that both retinoic acid and arsenic are able to correct this cellular defect. She then showed that arsenic induces the post-translational modification of PML-RARa by the small SUMO protein as well as the degradation of the oncoprotein.

Dejean-Assémat's laboratory next contributed to the emergence of the SUMO field by unveiling an as yet unanticipated function for this pathway as a major epigenetic determinant of gene expression regulation, with a key role in the repression of innate immunity and the maintenance of cell identity. Her work opened up new avenues in regenerative medicine and cancer treatment through pharmacological modulation of sumoylation levels.

3 articles published in Anne Dejean-Assémat's laboratory have been retracted pointing to instances of image manipulation. In 2019, the Pasteur Institute, CNRS and Inserm launched a joint investigation into research misconduct. The conclusion indicates that one staff scientist of the laboratory, who left the Institut Pasteur in April 2021, had engaged in fraudulent practice.

== Memberships and awards ==
Anne Dejean-Assémat has held several scientific advisory positions and served in the Scientific Council and as a president of the Genetics, Development and Cancer committee at Inserm (2008–2012). She received the Mergier-Bourdeix Prize of the French Academy of Sciences (1997), the Rosen Prize from the Medical Research Foundation (1998), the Mitjaville Prize of the National Academy of Medicine (1999), the Hamdan Award for Medical Research Excellence - Therapy in Leukemia in 2000, the Gagna and Van Heck Prize (2003), the Léopold Griffuel Prize from Association de recherche en cancérologie (ARC), (2010), the Prize L'Oréal-Unesco for Women in Science, (2010), the Duquesne Prize of la Ligue Nationale Contre le Cancer, (2014), the Grand Prix Inserm (2014) and the Sjöberg Prize of the Royal Swedish Academy of Science (2018). She was awarded two Advanced Grants from the European Research Council (ERC), in 2011 and 2018. She was appointed Officer in the Ordre national du Mérite, (2012) and in the ordre national de la Légion d'honneur, (2016). She was awarded the Shaw Prize in 2026.

Anne Dejean-Assémat is a member of the European Molecular Biology Organisation (EMBO) (1995), the French Academy of Science, (2004), the Academia Europaea (2005), the European Academy of Cancer Sciences, (2011) and the American Academy of Arts and Sciences (2020).
