= Jacques Pouysségur =

French medical researcher (born 1943)

Jacques Pouysségur is a French engineer and researcher. He was born on November 10, 1943, in Toulouse, Haute-Garonne.

He is a research director emeritus of the CNRS. He has conducted research at the Institute for Research on Cancer and Aging, Nice (IRCAN), at the University of Nice Sophia Antipolis. From 2013 to 2021, he also worked in the Department of Medical Biology, Scientific Centre of Monaco (CSM). He has been the head of the Tumor Hypoxia and Metabolism Team and a visiting professor at Kyoto Medical University, Kyoto, Japan, since 2013.

== Training and scientific career ==
Jacques Pouysségur studied biochemistry engineering from 1962 to 1966 at the Institut national des sciences appliquées de Lyon (INSA Lyon). He completed his 2-years Civil Military Service as Professor of Biochemistry from 1966 to 1968 at the Institute of Agronomy of Algiers (Algeria). He then defended his PhD thesis in 1972 in genetic regulation of E. coli in the lab of François Stoeber, (student of Jacques Monod) at INSA Lyon. He then joined the National Cancer Institute (Dr. Ira Pastan), Bethesda, USA as a postdoctoral researcher between 1974 and 1976. He then joined in 1978 as a CNRS Research Group Leader the Centre de Biochimie University Côte d'Azur, followed by CNRS Institutes (ISBDC, IRCAN) since 1978 and was Director of the ISBDC Institute, Signaling, Development Biology & Cancer, Nice between 1997 and 2007.

== Scientific interests and achievements ==
After his training in bacterial genetics, Jacques Pouysségur combined genetics and molecular biology to identify the signalling mechanisms of growth factors controlling cell proliferation. This team contributed to the fields of glycoproteins and cell adhesion, metabolism, intracellular pH regulation and molecular identification of the human Na+/H+ exchanger. In addition, the team determined that intracellular pH and MAP kinase (ERK1/2) are essential for the activation of mTORC1 and for controlling cell entry into the cell cycle.

Over the past 25 years, the team has turned its interest towards the mechanisms by which cells control nutrient intake. Interest in this process led the team to study the mechanisms of HIF-proline hydroxylase signalling, HIF1 stabilization under hypoxia, angiogenesis, autophagy, nutritional stress and aberrant tumor metabolism.

The team is pursuing, at a fundamental, translational and pre-clinical level, the physiological role of key targets induced by nutritional stress and tumor hypoxia. The focus is on the metabolism of fermented glucose (Warburg effect) or oxidative glucose in tumours, the import of amino acids under the influence of HIF or oxidative stress. Numerous anti-cancer targets inactivated by Zinc Finger Nucleases and/or CRISPR-Cas9 (carbonic anhydrases CA9, CA12, CA2, bicarbonate carriers NBC, lactate/H+ Symporters MCT1, MCT4, their chaperone CD147/basigine, key amino acid carriers : LAT1, ASCT2, xCT and their chaperones CD98, CD44...) were analyzed on tumor lines (colon, melanoma, breast, pancreas, lung). These targets, often strongly expressed in aggressive cancers, contribute to "Darwinian" selection within the hypoxic, acidic, denutrient tumor microenvironment leading to metastatic spread. Some of these targets (CA9, MCT, LAT1, ASCT2, xCT), with anticancer potential, are currently under pharmacological development.

== Honours and awards ==
=== Prizes ===
- Savoie Prize (LNCC); 1989,
- Delahautemaison Nephrology Prize (FRM); 1995,
- Rosen Oncology Prize (FRM); 1996,
- Lounsbery Prize of the American and French Academies of Sciences; 1999,
- Athena and Institut de France Prize; 2001,
- Leopold Griffuel Cancer Prize (ARC); 2001,
- Sir Hans Krebs Medal (FEBS); 2002,
- Carl Cori Reading Award (Roswell Park, US); 2008,

=== Appointments ===
- President of the Scientific Council of INCa;
- Member of EMBO;
- Member of the Académie des sciences;
- Member of the European Academy of Sciences, Academia Europaea;
- Knight of the National Ordre national du mérite;

=== Publications, conferences and citations ===
440 articles published in peer-reviewed journals; 515 scientific conferences as guest speaker - Google Scholar citations: 63,091 - h-factor: 137.
