= Yves Agid =

French physician

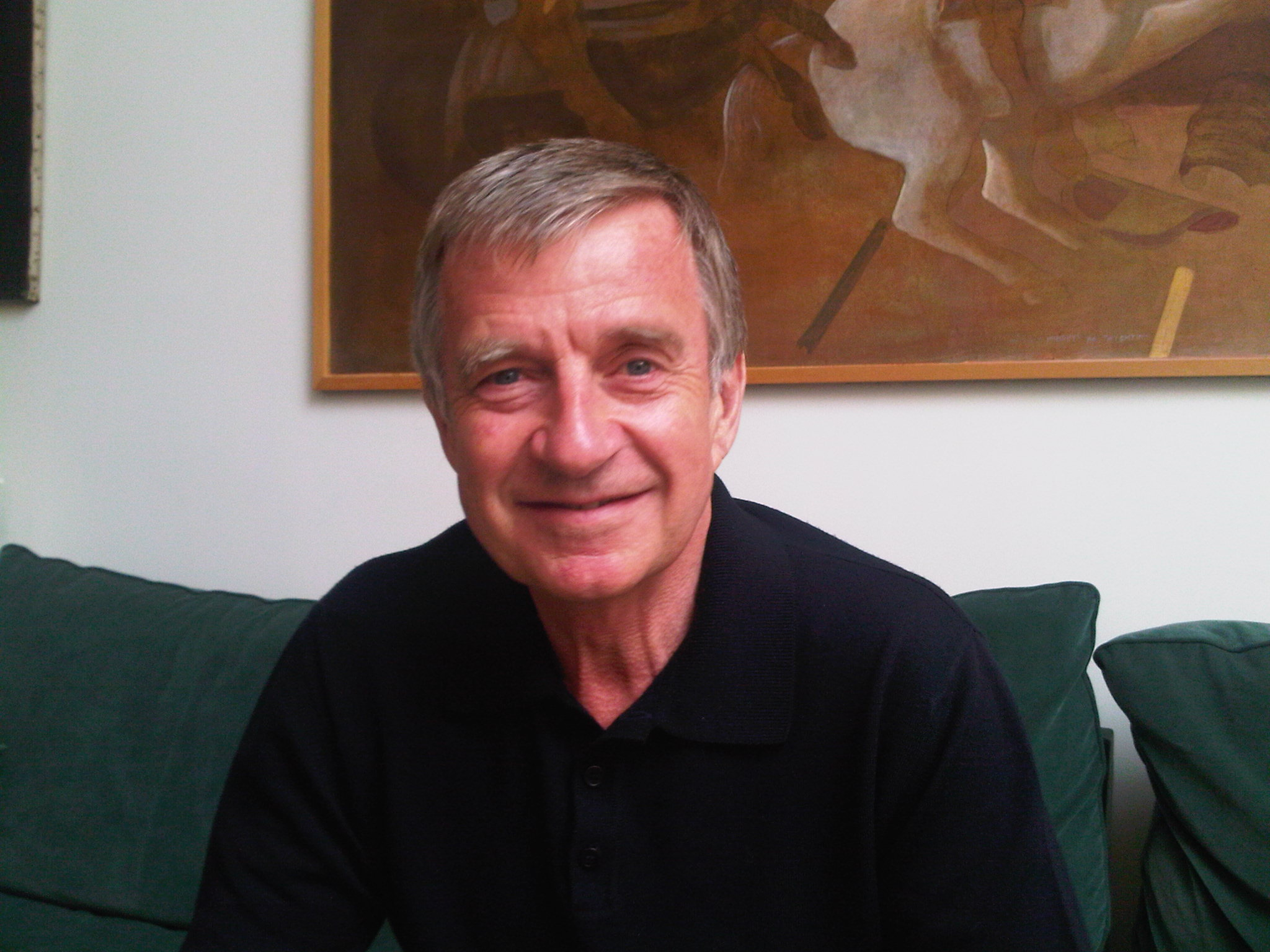
- Yves Agid in 2010
- Born: 13 November 1940 (age 85); Nice, France
- Education: Lycée Jean-Baptiste Corot; University of Pierre and Marie-Curie
- Occupation: Scientist

Yves Agid (born 13 November 1940 in Nice in the Alpes-Maritimes) is a neurologist, neuropsychiatrist, cell biologist, neurochemist, academician, university professor, hospital doctor, researcher in biology and scientist specializing in neurosciences.

== Early life and education ==
Yves Agid is the son of university professor Rene Agid and Swedish artist painter Sylvia Stave. Rene Agid was a close friend of Romain Gary. The latter dedicated his novel The Promise at Dawn to Rene and Sylvia Agid.

Yves Agid was educated at the Lycée Jean-Baptiste Corot in Savigny-sur-Orge and the Faculty of Medicine of Paris, Pierre-and-Marie-Curie University. He served as an hospital intern in Paris in 1966 and Chief clinical assistant of the neuropsychiatry department and hospitals in Paris 1973. He received his MD in 1973 from University of Paris. He obtained his PhD in Science in 1976 working with Jacques Glowinski at the College of France and became PU-PH in neurology and neuropsychology in 1979 at the Salpêtrière, then head of the Neurology Department at the Pitié-Salpêtrière from 1993 to 2007.

== Career ==
After leading the neurology department of the Pitié-Salpêtrière Hospital from 1993 to 2007 and having a career as a researcher at Inserm, Yves Agid was elected on December 16, 2008 as member of the Academy of Sciences in the human biology and medical sciences section. Since 2009 he is member of the National Ethics Advisory Committee of France. He is also founder and scientific director of the Brain and Spine Institute.

He is one of the most cited scientists of the past 20 years. Agid is professor of Neurology and Neurosciences at the ICM.

Meanwhile Agid led his research career at the French Institute of Health and Medical Research (INSERM) from 1985 to 2000 as director of the unit U289. In 2001 the Institute awarded him its Grand Prix for medical research (Grand Prix Inserm de la Recherche Médicale). Until 2005 Agid was the director of the Federate Research Institute (IFR)'s neuroscience department from 1997-2005, director of the Institute of Neurology from 2000 to 2002 and coordinator of clinical Investigation Centre since 1996. He was the Chairman of the Scientific Council of the Foundation for Medical Research from 2002-2004.

Agid is founder and scientific director of the Institute of the brain and spinal cord established in 2004. On April 12, 2010, at the World Day for Parkinson's disease, Yves Agid and Bruno Favier as the founders of the Association France Parkinson, presented a white paper entitled Recommendations Objective: leave the "most forgotten diseases of the brain" shadow to the Health Minister Roselyne Bachelot. He served as president of the French Neurological Society from 2002 - 2003. He was made the honorary professor of neurology at University of Paris.

Moreover, Yves Agid is since 2009 (and renewed in 2013) member of the National Advisory Committee Ethics. He has held various administrative positions at FRM and LEEM.

He has been the member of organizations like the French Society of Neurology, French Society for Neuroscience, European Society of Neurological Societies, American Academy of Neurology, American Neurological Association, Movement Disorder Society, Society for Neuroscience and Belgian Society of Neurology.

Yves Agid is a specialist in neurodegenerative diseases (Parkinson's disease, Alzheimer's disease, but also other nervous system diseases such as cerebellar ataxia, Charcot-Marie-Tooth disease, Tourette disease and mechanisms of neuronal apoptosis) of which he studied the causes, mechanisms, and clinical implications, while proposing new therapies. His research has been devoted to studying the mechanisms of cell death, and their pathophysiological and clinical consequences, with the essential model of Parkinson disease. His recent work focuses on glial cells―the other half of the brain.

Among his key contributions:

- identification of factors contributing to vulnerability and programmed neuronal cell death;
- the detection of mutations in various neurodegenerative diseases;
- description of various biochemical and anatomical systems of compensation for neuronal injury;
- the description of many clinical presentations in the field of neuropsychology and abnormal involuntary movements;
- the development of numerous pharmacological and neurosurgical treatment;

Yves Agid has published over 600 scientific articles at international level.

== Awards and honours ==
- 1984 Award Maujean Foundation of the Academy of Sciences.
- 1993: Alice Wilson Award (Parkinson's disease).
- 1994: Academy Award Mande Medicine.
- 1995 Price AGF-Athena Academy of Sciences.
- 2001: Grand Prix of Medical Research INSERM.
- 2003 Research Award from the American Academy of Neurology.
- 2004 Career Award of the Movement Disorder Society.
- 2004: Award of the French Thomson-ISI most cited neuroscientist in the last twenty years.
- 2008: Knight of the Legion of Honour.
- 2008: Elected Fellow of the Academy of Sciences' section - Human biology and medical sciences.
- 2009: Claude-Bernard Prix.
- 2025 Leonardo Da Vinci Prize from the European Academy of Sciences.
