= Jean Rossier =

Belgian biologist and academic (1944–2026)

- Born: 18 June 1944; Brussels, German-occupied Belgium and Northern France
- Died: January 2026 (aged 81)
- Education: Collège de France
- Occupations: Biologist; Academic

Jean Rossier (18 June 1944 – January 2026) was a Belgian biologist. He was a professor of biology at ESPCI Paris until his retirement in 2012 and was a member of the French Academy of Sciences.

== Life and career ==
Born in Brussels on 18 June 1944, Rossier studied medicine in his home city before earning a doctorate in biology in 1969 at the Collège de France under the direction of Jacques Glowinski. He worked as a researcher for Tufts University School of Medicine and at the Roche Institute of Molecular Biology. After the biology department at ESPCI Paris was founded by Pierre-Gilles de Gennes, Rossier became a professor and researcher there, working on techniques of the polymerase chain reaction. He also founded a startup called Genescore, which developed biotechnology for DNA microarrays. In 2003, he joined the scientific council of Gaz de France. A major advocate for teaching innovation and research in engineering schools, he created the Fondation pour les Sciences du Cerveau. Some of his main research included β-Carbolines and interneurons.

Rossier died in January 2026, at the age of 81.

== Distinctions ==
- Mentoring in Science Award from Nature (2011)
