= Le Moal =

Le Moal, or Moal, is a surname of Breton origin. Notable individuals with this surname include:

- André Le Moal (1923–1941), Breton French résistant shot on October 22, 1941
- Armand Le Moal (1914–1999), French cyclist
- Colette Le Moal (born 1932), member of the National Assembly of France
- Corinne Le Moal (born 1954), French rower
- Jean Le Moal (1909–2007), Breton French abstract painter
- Michel Le Moal (born 1934), French neurologist
