= Ethel Moustacchi =

French chemist (1933–2016)

- Moustacchi in 2011
- Born: 21 August 1933; Cairo, Egypt
- Died: 13 December 2016 (aged 83); Paris, France
- Citizenship: French
- Awards: Knight of the Legion of Honour
- Scientific career
- Fields: Molecular biology Radiobiology
- Workplaces: CNRS
- Thesis: Facteurs de la sensibilité des levures à l'action létale des radiations ionisantes : étude d'un mutant radio-résistant (1964)
- Doctoral advisor: Raymond Latarjet

Ethel Moustacchi (21 August 1933 - 13 December 2016) was an Egyptian-born French geneticist and research director of the French National Centre for Scientific Research (CNRS). She was a leading figure in molecular biology and radiobiology research. From 1988, she headed the Société française de génétique (French Genetic Society). She is remembered in particular for her interest in the mechanisms of mutagenesis and DNA repair, for her research into Fanconi anemia and for her call for more attention to be given to the health effects of small doses of radiation on nuclear workers and healthcare professionals.

In early 2026, Moustacchi was confirmed to be one of the 72 women to have their names added to those of the men already engraved on the Eiffel Tower.

== Early life and education ==
Esther Ethel Moustacchi was born in Cairo, Egypt, on 21 August 1933. Her father, Felix P. Moustacchi, was a Greek from Corfu, while her mother Flora (née Revi) was born in Cairo but came from a family established in Trieste. Ethel was their first child. After first attending an Italian-speaking primary school, she became a student at the French lycée in Cairo where she passed her baccalauréat. When only 17, on her own insistence, she moved to France in September 1951 to embark on her higher education, initially studying in Montpellier and then at the faculté des sciences de Paris where she studied chemistry and biology.

Moustacchi first spent a preparatory year in sciences at the University of Montpellier, then enrolled at the École Nationale Supérieure de Chimie de Paris, and in 1954 joined the Institut du Radium, later the Curie Institute in Paris, where she subsequently spent most of her career. She initially studied under geneticist Boris Ephrussi. Recruited by the French National Centre for Scientific Research (CNRS) in 1959, she began a thesis on the factors of radioresistance in yeast (French: Facteurs de la sensibilité des levures à l'action létale des radiations ionisantes : étude d'un mutant radio-résistant) under the supervision of Raymond Latarjet, which she defended in 1964.

== Career ==
Moustacchi left France to pursue postdoctoral studies in the United States and collaborated with Donald Williamson in Herschel L. Roman's laboratory at Washington State University in Seattle.

In 1966, aged 33 she returned to France and took over as head of the radio-biology laboratory at the faculté des sciences d'Orsay, a satellite branch of l'Institut du radium, and focused her research towards study of DNA damage.

In 1985, she returned to the Curie Institute's Paris site, taking over Raymond Latarjet's laboratory and focusing on the mechanisms of mutagenesis and DNA repair through a pathophysiology approach to chemotherapy and radiotherapy induced cancers. She also worked for over a decade on Fanconi's anemia, a rare genetic disease affecting the bone marrow.

From 1988 to 1992, she headed to French Genetic Institute and from 1995, became a scientific advisor for the Commissariat à l'énergie atomique et aux énergies alternatives (CEA), she called for more attention to be given to the health effects of small doses of radiation on nuclear workers and healthcare professionals.

Moustacchi headed the joint CNRS/Curie Institute UMR218 unit until her retirement in 1998.

In 1995, she became scientific advise for biology at the French Alternative Energies and Atomic Energy Commission.

Her successor at the French Genetic Institute, Geneviève Almouzni, complemented her on the encouragement and inspiration she and her team received from Ethel Moustacchi. She was "always attentive to the younger members of the unit and was constantly available for advice."

Moustacchi died in the 14th arrondissement of Paris on 13 December 2016, aged 83.

== Awards and commemoration ==
Moustacchi was appointed Chevalier de la Légion d'Honneur in 1999 and promoted to Officier in 2013.

In 2011, Ethel Moustacchi received the Prix d'honneur de l'Inserm for her life's work. She was also the recipient of the Pierre and Marie Curie Medal from the International Society for Radiobiology in French.

In 2026, Moustacchi was announced as one of 72 historical women in STEM whose names have been proposed to be added to the 72 men already celebrated on the Eiffel Tower. The plan was announced by the Mayor of Paris, Anne Hidalgo following the recommendations of a committee led by Isabelle Vauglin of Femmes et Sciences and Jean-François Martins, representing the operating company which runs the Eiffel Tower.

== Selected publications ==
- Sequence specificity in photoreaction of various psoralen derivatives with DNA: Role in biological activity
- 6,4,4′-Trimethylangelicin photoadduct immunodetection in DNA: induction and repair in Fanconi's anemia and normal human fibroblasts
- Round table - DNA repair pathways and dose responses to ionizing radiations
- Moustacchi EDNA damage and repair: consequences on dose-responses. Mutat Res 464: 35-40
- Distribution and Repair of Bipyrimidine Photoproducts in Solar UV-irradiated Mammalian Cells
- FANCD1 et BRCA2, un seul et même gène?
- Fanconi anemia: Genes and function(s) revisited
- Sensitivity to photoaddition of mono- and bifunctional furocoumarins of X-ray sensitive mutants of Saccharomyces cerevisiae
- EXCISION OF PYRIMIDINE DIMERS FROM THE NUCLEAR DNA OF A HAPLOID RESPIRATION‐DEFICIENT (ρ) STRAIN OF SACCHAROMYCES CEREVISIAE
- Un rôle pour les UVA dans les dommages solaires causés à l'ADN
- Biologie cellulaire et moléculaire de l'anémie de Fanconi

Researchgate records 245 publications by Moustachi

== See also ==
- List of women associated with Marie Curie and Irène Joliot-Curie
