= Costagliola =

Costagliola is a surname. Notable people with the surname include:

- Dominique Costagliola (born 1954), French epidemiologist and biostatistician
- Leonardo Costagliola (1921–2008), Italian football player and manager
