= Pier-Vincenzo Piazza =

French physician, psychiatrist, and neurobiologist

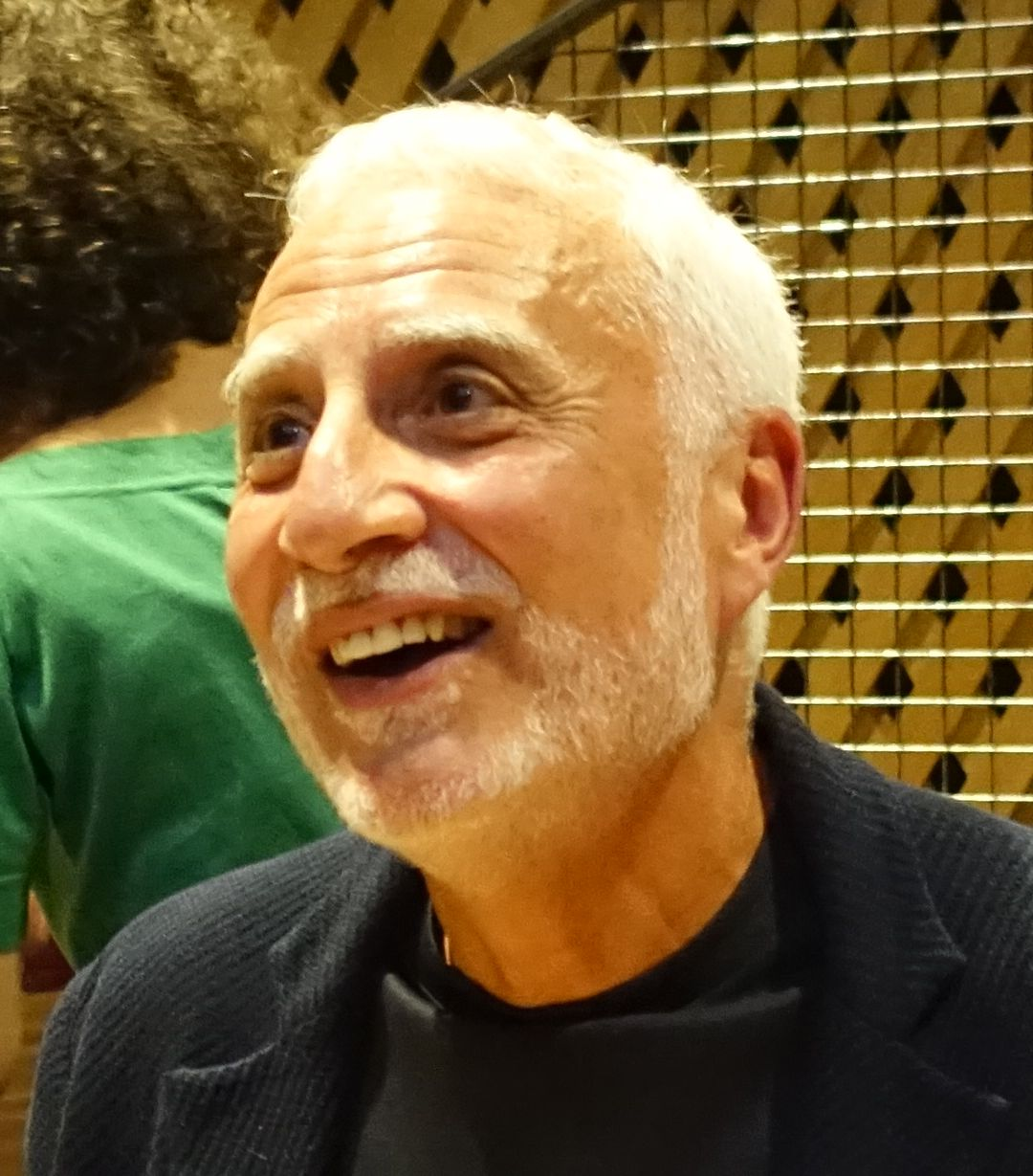
- Pier-Vincenzo-Piazza (2019)
- Born: May 28, 1961 (age 64); Italy
- Occupations: physician, psychiatrist, and neurobiologist
- Known for: specializing in addictology and psychiatric disorders
- Notable work: founded the Magendie Neurocenter in Bordeaux, founded the biotech start-up Aelis Farma
- Awards: INSERM Grand Prix (2015)

Pier-Vincenzo Piazza (born May 28, 1961) is a French physician, psychiatrist, and neurobiologist, specializing in addictology and psychiatric disorders.

== Biography ==
Piazza was born in Italy. After completing his studies in medicine and psychiatry in Palermo, Piazza moved to France in 1988, to pursue a six-month postdoctoral fellowship in the "Psychobiology of Adaptive Behaviors" laboratory (Inserm Unit 259) under the supervision of Professor Michel Le Moal at the Bordeaux University Hospital.

Following his post-doctoral research, he continued to conduct research in the Bordeaux region throughout his career. In 1998, he was appointed Director of Research at Inserm, the French National Institute of Health and Medical Research.

He is the founder of the Magendie Neurocenter in Bordeaux, which he directed until the end of 2017. In September 2017, he became the co-creator and coordinator of the Bordeaux Neurocampus, an interdisciplinary neuroscience hub that united six institutions.

By studying the molecular mechanisms of addiction and psychiatric diseases, he has paved the way for a new pharmacological class to combat Down's syndrome, schizophrenia, or the effects of THC, the active molecule in cannabis. He is also interested in the mechanism of vulnerability to drugs.

He received the INSERM Grand Prix in 2015 for his overall research on the pathophysiological mechanisms of psychiatric diseases. He also received the Grand Prix Lamonica of Neurology from the Academy of Sciences in 2015.

In 2013, he founded the biotech start-up Aelis Farma, which he chaired at the end of 2017 after being placed on leave from Inserm. The objective of this company is the development of a new pharmacological class that should make it possible by 2020 to treat cannabis addiction and certain cognitive diseases.
