= Pierre Ducimetière =

French epidemiologist (1942–2026)

- Born: 6 June 1942; Sallanches, France
- Died: 16 January 2026 (aged 83); Vitry-sur-Seine, France
- Education: École polytechnique Pierre and Marie Curie University (DEA, DND)
- Occupation: Epidemiologist

Pierre Ducimetière (French: [pjɛʁ dysimtjɛʁ]; 6 June 1942 – 16 January 2026) was a French epidemiologist.

Ducimetière spent his career conducting research for Inserm and directed the Groupement d'intérêt scientifique from 2005 to 2013.

Ducimetière died in Vitry-sur-Seine on 16 January 2026, at the age of 83.
