= Cécile Charrier =

French neuroscience researcher

- Education: Pierre and Marie Curie University
- Occupation: Neuroscientist
- Known for: Irène Joliot-Curie "Young Female Scientist" award

Cécile Charrier (born 1983) is a French neuroscientist research fellow at Inserm, the Institut national de la santé et de la recherche médicale (the French National Institute of Health and Medical Research), at the Ecole Normale Supérieure Institute of Biology. She received the Irène Joliot-Curie "Young Female Scientist of the Year" award in 2021 for her work.

== Life and work ==
Charrier has said that she knew from high school that she wanted to become a neurobiologist. She earned her master's degree in neuroscience and defended her doctoral thesis in neuroscience, supervised by Antoine Triller, in 2009 at the Pierre and Marie Curie University, which became part of Sorbonne University in 2018. She went on to do three post-docs, one at Inserm, then at University of North Carolina and finally at Scripps Research Institute in La Jolla, California. There she studied the SRGAP2C gene that appeared at the time when Australopithecus and Homo separated, around 2.4 million years ago. Charrier's research demonstrated the crucial role that this gene played on the "development of characteristics specific to human synapses, a discovery that determined her subsequent career."

She returned to Inserm in 2013 as a tenured researcher and since 2014 she has worked with a research group at the Biology Institute of the Ecole Normale Supérieure (IBENS) where she leads own team of researchers.

In 2021, the French Academy of Sciences gave her its Irène Joliot-Curie Young Female Scientist of the Year award for her work, citing:

"The overall theme of Charrier's research is to understand the fundamental mechanisms of synapse development and plasticity and to identify regulations that only exist in humans. In parallel, her work has also focused on technological developments such as the development of a three-dimensional optical and electronic microscopy technique that allows the ultrastructural and quantitative characterization of synapse subtypes.

Charrier actively encourages the employment of more women in biology and research.

== Awards ==
- 2021: Irène Joliot-Curie "Young Female Scientist of the Year" award

== Selected publications ==
- Charrier, C., Ettouati, L., & Paris, J. (1999). New application of the Julia olefination for the synthesis of Tyr-Gly E-alkene and carba isostere pseudopeptides. Tetrahedron letters, 40(31), 5705–5707.
- Charrier, C., Ehrensperger, M. V., Dahan, M., Lévi, S., & Triller, A. (2006). Cytoskeleton regulation of glycine receptor number at synapses and diffusion in the plasma membrane. Journal of Neuroscience, 26(33), 8502–8511.
- Charrier, C., Machado, P., Tweedie-Cullen, R. Y., Rutishauser, D., Mansuy, I. M., & Triller, A. (2010). A crosstalk between β1 and β3 integrins controls glycine receptor and gephyrin trafficking at synapses. Nature neuroscience, 13(11), 1388–1395.
- Charrier, C., & Polleux, F. (2012). Rôle de la duplication partielle du gène SRGAP2 dans l'évolution et le développement du cerveau humain. médecine/sciences, 28(11), 911–914.
- Charrier, C., Joshi, K., Coutinho-Budd, J., Kim, J. E., Lambert, N., De Marchena, J., ... & Polleux, F. (2012). Inhibition of SRGAP2 function by its human-specific paralogs induces neoteny during spine maturation. Cell, 149(4), 923–935.
- Fossati, M., Pizzarelli, R., Schmidt, E. R., Kupferman, J. V., Stroebel, D., Polleux, F., & Charrier, C. (2016). SRGAP2 and its human-specific paralog co-regulate the development of excitatory and inhibitory synapses. Neuron, 91(2), 356–369.
