= Michel Desmurget =

French neuroscientist

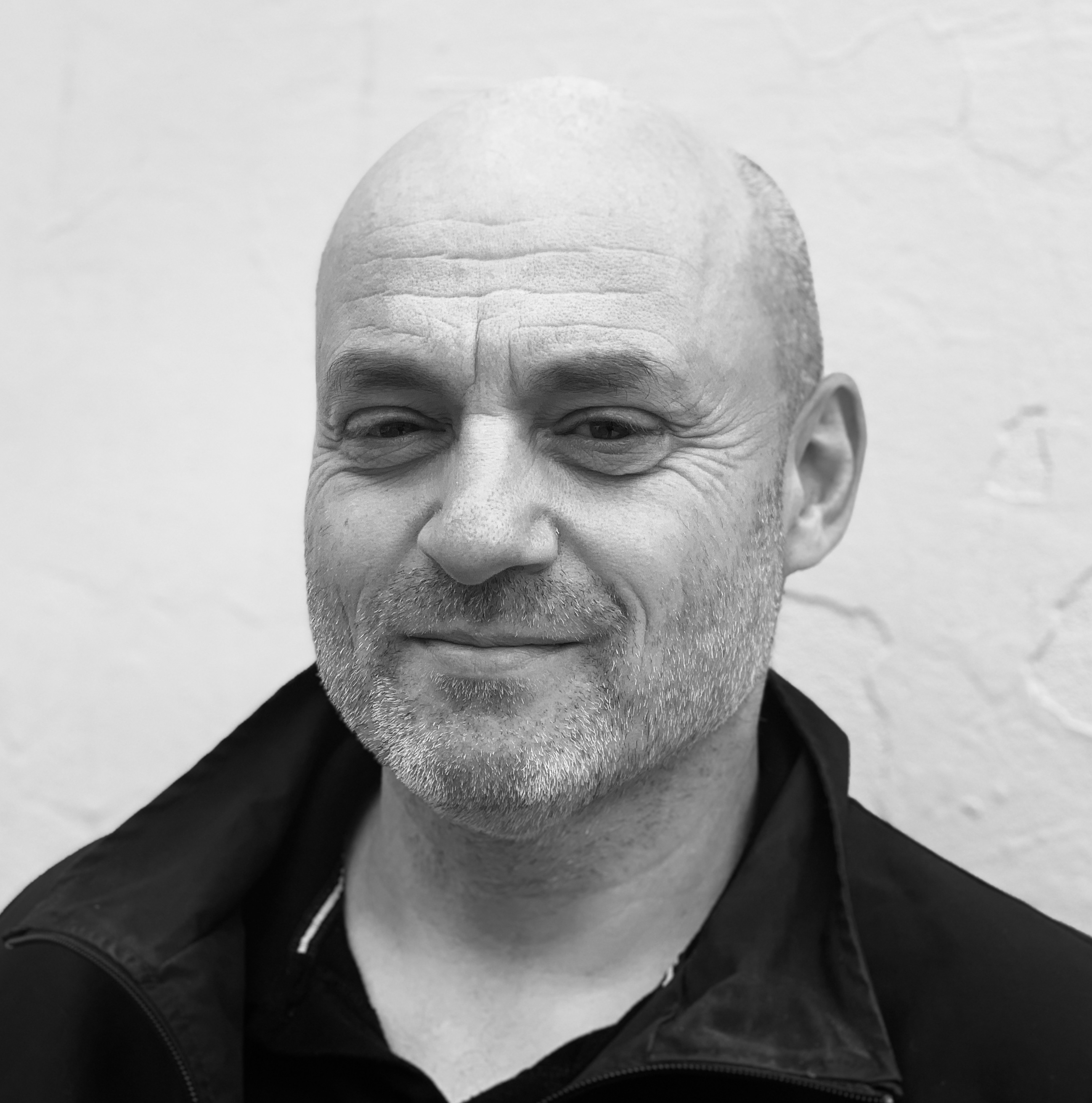
Michel Desmurget

Michel Desmurget is a French researcher and writer specializing in cognitive neuroscience.

== Biography ==
Son of a French father and a German mother, Desmurget is a doctor in neurosciences. He works at the Marc Jeannerod Institute of Cognitive Sciences, which is jointly financed by the (French National Centre for Scientific Research and the University of Lyon.

He lived in the United States for nearly eight years, working at several American universities, including the Massachusetts Institute of Technology, Emory University, and the University of California, San Francisco. In 2011, he was appointed "directeur de recherche" (an academic rank equivalent to full professor) at the Institut national de la santé et de la recherche médicale.

His research covers the effects that television and exposure to screens of all kinds produce on our health and our cognitive development, especially in childhood and adolescence.

He wrote TV lobotomie: La vérité scientifique sur les effets de la télévision (2011), which denounces the harmful effects of television on health and cognitive development, especially in children. He has also studied the effects of various slimming diets on the body and recounts his experience in L'Anti-régime, maigrir pour de bon (2018).

The book La Fabrique du crétin digital: Les dangers des écrans pour nos enfants (2019) (Screen Damage: The Dangers of Digital Media for Children) was described by France Inter radio as a "public health book", and was awarded the Femina Prize for essay in 2019.

== Bibliography ==
- Imitation et apprentissages moteurs : des neurones miroirs à la pédagogie du geste sportif (2006)
- Mad in U.S.A.: Les Ravages du modèle américain (2008) Mad in U.S.A.: The ravages of the American model (2023)
- TV Lobotomie: La Vérité scientifique sur les effets de la télévision (2012) TV Lobotomy: The scientific truth about the effects of television (2023)
- L'Anti-régime: Maigrir pour de bon (2015)
- La Fabrique du crétin digital: Les dangers des écrans pour nos enfants (2019) Screen Damage: The Dangers of Digital Media for Children (2022)
- Faites-les lire! (2023)
