= Thomas Römer =

Swiss biblical scholar, exegete, philologist, and professor

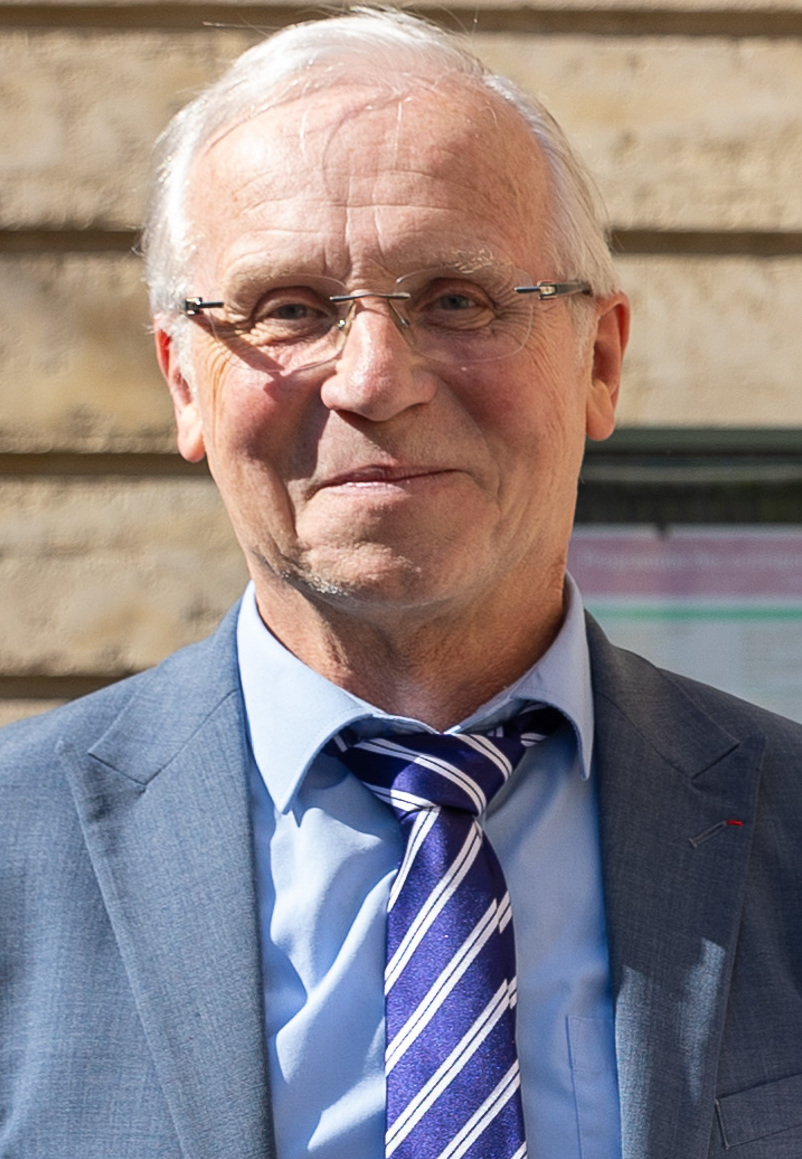
- Born: 13 December 1955; Mannheim
- Education: University of Geneva, Heidelberg University, University of Tübingen
- Occupations: Biblical scholar, university teacher, editor, writer, exegete, Hebrew Bible scholar, Protestant theologian
- Employers: Collège de France (2007–); University of Geneva (1984–1993); University of Lausanne (1993–2003)
- Awards: honorary doctor of Tel Aviv University (2015); prix Pierre-Antoine-Bernheim (2014); Chevalier of the Legion of Honour (2019); Knight of the French Order of Academic Palms (2021); Commandeur des Arts et des Lettres (2022)

Thomas Christian Römer (German: [ˈtoːmas ˈʁøːmɐ]; born 13 December 1955) is a German-born Swiss biblical scholar, exegete, philologist, professor, and Reformed minister. After teaching at the University of Geneva, he became professor of the Old Testament at the University of Lausanne. Since 2007, he has held the chair "Biblical environments" at the Collège de France, of which he became administrator in 2019.

== Biography ==
=== Life ===
Thomas Römer was born 13 December 1955 in Mannheim (Germany). He was raised in a practicing Protestant family of German descent and was very passionate about the Old Testament. From 1982 to 1984, He was trainee minister of the Reformed Church of France in Nancy.

=== Education ===
He studied Theology and Religious studies at the theological faculties of the University of Heidelberg and University of Tübingen from 1974 to 1980. He also studied Biblical Hebrew, Ugaritic, and other Semitic languages notably under the direction of Rolf Rendtorff, professor of Old Testament in Heidelberg, who encouraged him to develop a thesis on the question of the Jewish Patriarchs in the Book of Deuteronomy and the Deuteronomist history. From 1980 to 1982, Römer studied Religious studies at the École pratique des hautes études in Paris. During his preparation in Paris, where he arrived in 1980, he attended the École pratique des hautes études, the Catholic Institute of Paris, and the Protestant Faculty of Theology in Paris—where his teacher was the exegete Françoise Florentin-Smyth—and obtained his doctorate in 1988.

==== Doctoral thesis ====
His doctoral thesis entitled Israels Väter combines structuralist and historico-critical approaches, and is part of the continuation of the work of John Van Seters. It postulates the controversial aim of the editors of Deuteronomy against certain Judean circles and that the Pentateuch is the result of an attempt to unify between two factions internal to post-Babylonian exile, split between the exiles returning from Babylon and the Jews who remained in the country and whose visions are expressed respectively through the tradition of the Jewish Patriarchs and that of the Exodus. This thesis innovates in particular by suggesting that the fathers mentioned in Deuteronomy are those of the Exodus and not the Patriarchs, that the Deuteronomist editor considers that the only and true Israel is in the Golah, that is to say the exiled Babylonians, and that the patriarchs Abraham, Isaac, and Jacob did not appear in Deuteronomy until the final writing and editing of the Pentateuch.

== Academic work ==
=== University of Geneva ===
From 1984 to 1989, Römer was a research assistant of Albert de Pury in the Old Testament at the Faculty of Theology of the University of Geneva, and lecturer of Biblical Hebrew and Ugaritic. At the invitation of Albert de Pury, met in Paris, Thomas Römer joined the University of Geneva where he became senior lecturer at the Faculty of Theology from 1989 to 1991, before he became assistant professor teaching biblical philology and biblical exegesis from 1991 until 1993.

=== University of Lausanne ===
Since 1993, he was a professor of Biblical Hebrew at the Faculty of Theology and Science of Religions at the University of Lausanne, as well as at the Institut romand des sciences bibliques (IRSB), which is affiliated with the university. In 2003, French authorities contacted him when President Jacques Chirac sought clarification about George W. Bush's references to the biblical prophecies of "Gog and Magog", made a few weeks before the invasion of Iraq. He provided a biblical analysis of this apocalyptic prophecy.

=== Collège de France ===
In 2007, at the invitation of the assyriologist Jean-Marie Durand, Thomas Römer was appointed professor at the Collège de France where he held the chair "Milieux Bibliques": it was the first time that the term "Bible" appeared in a title of a research program of the College de France.

Since 2013, he has directed "Near East-Caucasus: languages, archeology, cultures" research unit at the Collège de France. In 2016 he was elected as a foreign associate of the Académie des Inscriptions et Belles-Lettres, in the chair of the medievalist Peter Lewis.

His work has contributed to renewing the understanding of the formation and dating of the Pentateuch as well as of the constitution of Jewish traditions on Abraham and Moses in particular. Thus, his work The So-Called Deuteronomistic History, published in English in 2005 and translated into several languages, marks a milestone in the history of Deuteronomist research. In January 2019, he made the cover of the popular science journal for the general public Sciences et Avenir for his philological and archaeological work on the Ark of the Covenant and his participation in excavations at the archaeological site of Kiriath-Jearim in Israel.

From 2015 to 2019, Römer was Vice-President of the Assembly of Professors of the Collège de France. On 1 September 2019 he was appointed administrator of the Collège de France, succeeding Alain Prochiantz. Of German and Swiss nationality, he became the first foreigner to head the Collège de France.

=== Historical-critical approach ===
Thomas Römer adopts an academic approach which combines historical criticism, literary and philological analysis of Old Testament texts, sometimes supported by archeology, seeking to detect the social, political or cultural circumstances which are the framework of the religious thought they generate, regardless of impact or contemporary theological readings. He notes that the writing of biblical texts constitutes a form of synthesis between identity conceptions and quite different theological conceptions and believes that this approach, which sometimes clashes with traditional representations, can serve both atheists and believers in their reflections on current issues.

== Editorial work ==
The Society of Biblical Literature Press, Ancient Israel and Its Literature (AIL) editorial board is led by series editor Thomas C. Römer.

== Honours and awards ==
=== Honours ===
- 2019: Knight of the Legion of Honour.
- 2021: Knight of the Ordre des Palmes académiques.
- 2022: Commander of the Ordre des Arts et des Lettres.

=== Awards ===
- 2014: Prize for the history of religions of the Foundation Les amis de Pierre-Antoine Bernheim of the Académie des Inscriptions et Belles-Lettres.
- 2015: Leenaards Foundation Cultural Prize.
- 2021: Lausanne University Medal.

=== Honorary degrees ===
- 2015: Tel Aviv University.
- 2022: Catholic University of Lyon.
- 2026: University of Pretoria.

=== Distinctions ===
- 2026 : Extraordinary Professor in the Department of Old Testament and Hebrew Scriptures at the University of Pretoria.

== Publications ==
Bibliography (1984–2016): IRSB Publications.

- Römer, Thomas (1990). Israels Väter: Untersuchungen zur Väterthematik im Deuteronomium und in der deuteronomistischen Tradition. Orbis Biblicus et Orientalis (in German). Vol. 99. Freiburg, Schweiz: Universitätsverlag; Göttingen: Vandenhoeck & Ruprecht. ISBN 9783727806735. OCLC 22099772.
- Thomas Römer and Jean-Daniel Macchi, Guide de la Bible hébraïque: La critique textuelle dans la Biblia Hebraica Stuttgartensia (BHS), Genève, Labor et Fides, 1994
- Thomas Römer, Dieu obscur: Le sexe, la cruauté et la violence dans l’Ancien Testament, Genève, Labor et Fides, coll. « Essais Bibliques » (no 27), 1998 (1re éd. 1996)
- Thomas Römer, Le peuple élu et les autres: L’Ancien Testament entre exclusion et ouverture, Poliez-le-Grand, Éditions du Moulin, 1997
- Thomas Römer, Les chemins de la sagesse: Proverbes, Job, Qohéleth, Poliez-le-Grand, Éditions du Moulin, 1999
- Thomas Römer, Moïse « lui que Yahvé a connu face à face », Paris, Gallimard, coll. « Découvertes Gallimard / Religions » (no 424), 2002
- Thomas Römer, Jérémie: Du prophète au livre, Poliez-le-Grand, Éditions du Moulin, 2003
- Thomas Römer and Loyse Bonjour, L'homosexualité dans le Proche-Orient ancien et la Bible, Genève, Labor et Fides, coll. « Essais bibliques » (no 37), 2005
- Römer, Thomas (2006). The So-Called Deuteronomistic History. London, Continuum International Publishing Group; New York: T & T Clark. ISBN 9780567040220. OCLC 62089069.
- Thomas Römer (trans. F. Smyth), La première histoire d'Israël: L'École deutéronomiste à l'œuvre, Genève, Labor et Fides, coll. « Le Monde de la Bible » (no 56), 2007
- Thomas Römer, Psaumes interdits, Aubonne, Éditions du Moulin, 2007
- Römer, Thomas (2009). Les Cornes de Moïse: Faire entrer la Bible dans l'histoire. Leçons inaugurales du Collège de France. Vol. 206. Paris: Collège de France, Fayard. ISBN 9782821814660. OCLC 949650209.
- Thomas Römer, Jean-Marie Durand et Jean-Pierre Mahé, La faute et sa punition dans les sociétés orientales, Leuven, Peeters, 2013
- Römer, Thomas; Davies, Philip R. (2013). Writing the Bible: Scribes, Scribalism and Script. Bible world (London, England). Durham, Acumen Publishing. ISBN 9781844657315. OCLC 827261812.
- Thomas Römer, L’Invention de Dieu, Paris, Seuil, coll. « Les Livres du nouveau monde », 2014
- Thomas Römer, La Bible, quelles histoires!: Les dernières découvertes, les dernières hypothèses, Genève, Labor et Fides, 2014 (ISBN 978-2-8309-1541-9)
- Thomas Römer, Moïse en version originale: Enquête sur le récit de la sortie d’Égypte, Bayard/Labor et Fides, 2015 (ISBN 978-2-8309-1584-6)
- Thomas Römer and Léonie Bischoff, Naissance de la Bible: comment elle a été écrite, Bruxelles, Le Lombard, coll. « La Petite Bédéthèque des savoirs » (no 23), 2018 (ISBN 978-2-8036-7101-4)
- Thomas Römer and Israel Finkelstein, Aux origines de la Torah: Nouvelles rencontres, nouvelles perspectives, Paris, Bayard, 2019 (ISBN 978-2227494701)
- Thomas Römer and Jacqueline Chabbi, Dieu de la Bible, Dieu du Coran, Paris, Le Seuil, 2020 (ISBN 9782021421361).
- Thomas Römer and Frédéric Boyer, Une Bible peut en cacher une autre : Le conflit des récits, Paris, Montrouge, Bayard, 2021.
- Thomas Römer, Psaumes interdits : Du silence à la violence de Dieu, Paris, Cerf, coll. « Lexio », 2022.
- Thomas Römer, Genèse 11,27–25,18 : L’histoire d’Abraham, Paris, Labor et Fides, 2023.
- Thomas Römer, La Bible, qu'est-ce que ça change ?, Paris, Labor et Fides, 2025.

== Bibliography ==
- "RÖMER Thomas". Académie des Inscriptions et Belles-Lettres (in French). 24 June 2014.
- "Le Prix 2014 d'histoire des religions de la Fondation " Les amis de Pierre-Antoine Bernheim " a été décerné le 20 juin par l'Académie des Inscriptions et Belles-Lettres à M. Thomas Römer pour son ouvrage " L'invention de Dieu " (Seuil, 2014)". Académie des Inscriptions et Belles-Lettres (in French). 24 June 2014.
- "George W. Bush et le Code Ezéchiel". Allez Savoir. No. 39. 2007-09-10.
- Arnaud, Bernadette (2019-09-06). "Thomas Römer, nouvel administrateur du Collège de France". Sciences et Avenir.
- "Décret du 19 novembre 2007 portant nomination et titularisation d'un professeur du Collège de France - M. Römer (Thomas)". Légifrance.
- "Décret du 18 juillet 2019 portant nomination de l'administrateur du Collège de France - M. RÖMER (Thomas)". Légifrance.
- "Curriculum Vitae" (PDF). college-de-france.fr. (in French).
- Hjelm, Ingrid (2004). Jerusalem's Rise to Sovereignty: Zion and Gerizim in Competition. The Library of Hebrew Bible/Old Testament Studies. Bloomsbury Publishing. p. 9. ISBN 9780567331977.
- "Thomas Römer". Université de Lausanne.
- Institut romand des sciences bibliques. "Thomas Römer". Université de Lausanne.
- Herzberg, Nathaniel (2019-10-05). "Thomas Römer, le sacre du " bibliste " Le professeur de théologie vient d'être élu administrateur du Collège de France, qu'il avait intégré en 2009". Le monde.
- Neighbor News (2015-05-20). "Tel Aviv University Awards Highest Honors to Atherton Philanthropist Lorry Lokey". Neighbor News.
- "Ancient Israel and its Literature". Society of Biblical Literature.
- Zhou, Zhihuan (2019-09-30). "Professor Thomas RÖMER appointed as the new chairman of the Collège de France" (PDF). Collège de France.
- Zúñiga, Hanzel (2020-09-18). "Thomas Römer en Costa Rica". Universidad Bíblica Latinoamericana.
