= Pierre Corvol =

French doctor and biology researcher (born 1941)

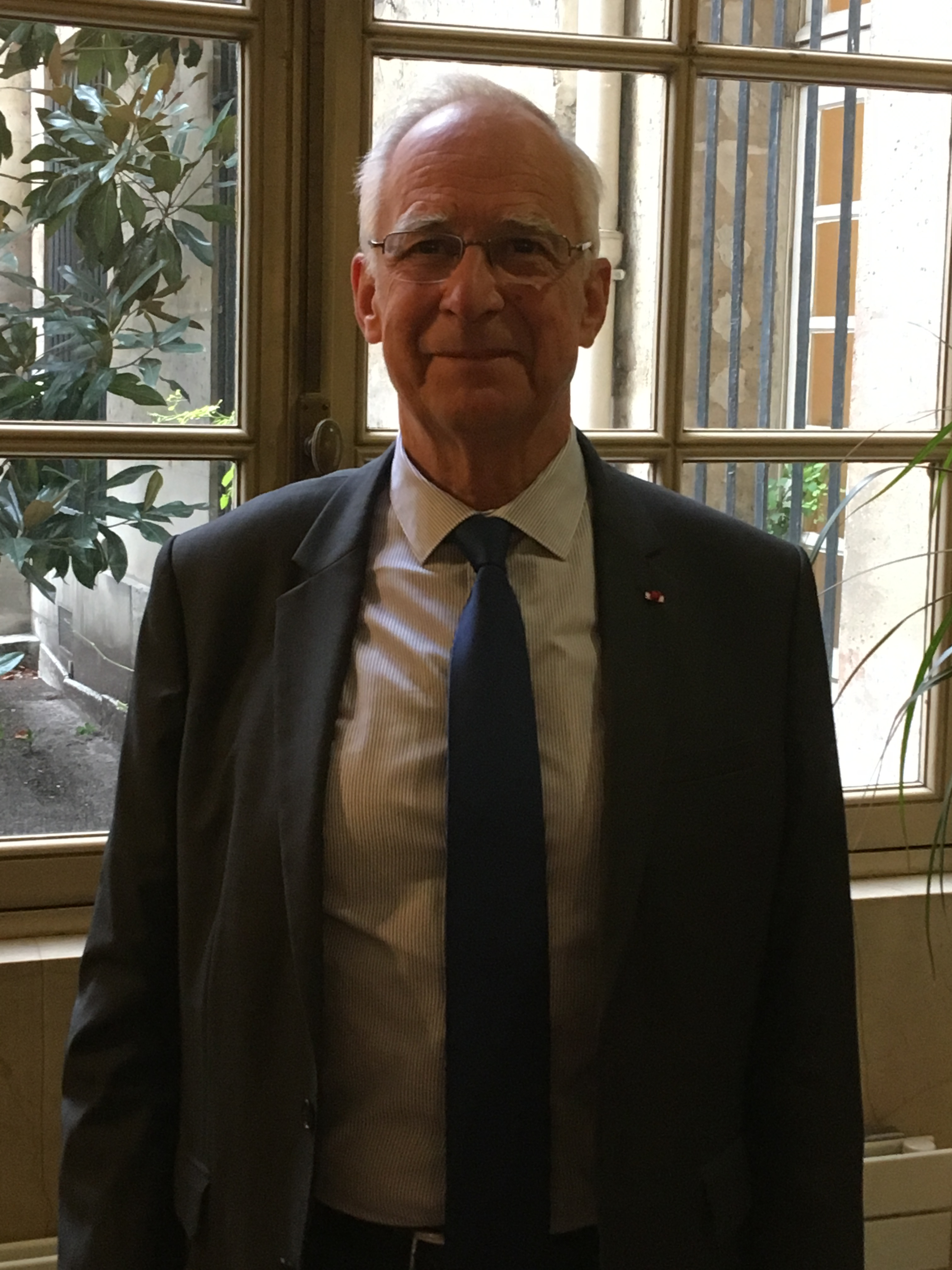
- Corvol in 2019
- Born: August 18, 1941 (age 85); Boulogne-Billancourt, France
- Scientific career
- Fields: Endocrinology

Pierre Corvol (born 18 August 1941) is a French doctor and biology researcher. He was director of the Collège de France from 2006 to August 2012.

== Early life and education ==
Corvol studied at the Lycée Condorcet in Paris, France. He served as resident at academic hospitals of Paris (1964), and spent post-doctoral research at the National Institutes of Health in Bethesda, Maryland, USA, in 1969.

== Scientific career ==
He became an associate professor at CHU Broussais Hôtel-Dieu in 1976. In 1983, he took over the management of Inserm's U36 (Vascular Pathology and Renal Endocrinology) and was elected as the chairman of the experimental medicine department at the Collège de France in 1989, a position he held until 2012. He was director of the Collège de France from 2006 to August 2012, and was succeeded by Serge Haroche.

Corvol is a researcher in the field of endocrine regulation of blood pressure and hypertension. In particular, he was one of the discoverers of the hormone regulatory system, the renin angiotensin system, and the angiotensin converting enzyme.

His work contributes to the development of therapeutics blocking the renin-angiotensin-aldosterone system. These drugs are widely used in the treatment of high blood pressure, heart failure and kidney failure in diabetics. He was a pioneer of the genetics of high blood pressure in humans. He has shown the importance of genetic markers in the renin system for predisposition to hypertension, cardiovascular disease and renal complications in diabetics.

== Professional activities ==
Corvol chaired the Scientific Council of the Foundation for Medical Research (1995-1998), the Scientific Council of Inserm (1999-2003), the Board of Directors of the École normale supérieure (2001-2004), and the Scientific Council of the Assistance public-Hôpitaux de Paris (2004-2006). He was a member of Inserm's Scientific Steering Committee from 1985 to 1992 and played a major role in the creation of Clinical Investigation Centres (1990-1992), which allowed clinical research in hospitals.

In 2016, he was commissioned by Thierry Mandon to report on scientific integrity, which encouraged a series of measures for scientific integrity in France, including the creation of the French Office for Scientific Integrity in 2017.

== Honors ==
He became a full member of the French Academy of Sciences in 1995, and President in 2019. He was elected a member of the American Academy of Arts and Sciences in 2000. On 9 December 2008, he became a full member of the (United States) National Academy of Medicine. He holds an honorary doctorate from the Universities of Lausanne (1997), Geneva (2006) and Semmelweis University of Budapest (2012). He has also received the following

- 1973: Award for research on high blood pressure. National High Blood Pressure League
- 1980: Claude Bernard Grand Prize, City of Paris
- 1980: Young researcher Award, International Society of Hypertension
- 1981: Jeanine Courrier Prize from the Academy of Sciences, Institut de France
- 1982: AC Corcoran Lecture Award, Council for High Blood Pressure Research, Cleveland
- 1983: Recipient of the Laurence B. Ellis Reading. Haravard Medical School
- 1984: European Society of Clinical Inverstigation Award
- 1985: Ciba award for hypertension research. Council for high blood pressure research.
- 1985: Grand prix scientifique de la Ville de Paris
- 1990: European Medal, British Society of Endocrinology
- 1993: Humboldt Prize
- 2004: Robert Tigerstedt Award, American Society of Hypertension
- 2006: Grand Prize for Medical Research at Inserm.
- 2008: Commander of the ordre national de la Légion d'honneur
- 2017: Grand Officer of the Ordre du mérite
- 2019: Leonardo da Vinci Award

== Publications ==
His publications include:

- Panthier J.J., Foote S., Chambraud B., Strosberg A.D., Corvol P. and Rougeon F. Complete amino-acid sequence and maturation of the mouse submaxillary gland renin precursor. Nature 298: 90–92, 1982.
- Galen F.X., Corvol M.T., Devaux C., Gubler M.C., Mounier F., Camilleri J.P., Houot A.M., Ménard J. and Corvol P. Renin biosynthesis by human tumoral juxtaglomerular cells: evidence for a renin precursor. J. Clin. Invest. 73 : 1144–1155, 1984.
- Soubrier F., Alhenc-Gelas F., Hubert C., Allegrini J., John M., Tregear G. and Corvol P. Two putative active centers in human angiotensin I-converting enzyme revealed by molecular cloning. Proc. Natl. Acad. Sci. USA 85: 9386–9390, 1988.
- Rigat B., Hubert C., Alhenc-Gelas F., Cambien F., Corvol P. and Soubrier F. An insertion/deletion polymorphism in the angiotensin I-converting enzyme gene accounting for half the variance of serum enzyme levels. J. Clin. Invest. 86: 1343–1346, 1990.
- Jeunemaitre X. Soubrier F., Kotelevtsev Y., Lifton R., Williams C., Charru A., Hunt S., Hopkins P., Williams R., Lalouel J.M. and Corvol P. Molecular basis of human hypertension: Role of angiotensinogen. Cell 71 : 169–180, 1992.
- Rousseau A., Michaud A., Chauvet M-T., Lenfant M. and Corvol P. The hemoregulatory peptide Acetyl-N-Ser-Asp-Lys-Pro is a natural and specific substrate of the N-terminal active site of human angiotensin-converting enzyme. J. Biol. Chem. 270 : 3656–3661, 1995
- Dive V., Cotton J., Yiotakis A., Michaud A., Vissiliou S., Jiracek J., Vazeux G., Chauvet M-T., Cuniasse P. and Corvol P. RXP407, a phosphinic peptide, is a potent inhibitor of angiotensin I converting enzyme able to differentiate between its two active sites. Proc. Natl. Acad. Sci. USA 96 : 4330–4335, 1999.
- Cole J., Ertoy D., Lin H., Sutliff R.L., Ezan E., Guyene T.T., Capecchi M., Corvol P. and Bernstein K.E. Lack of angiotensin II-facilitated erythropoiesis causes anemia in angiotensin-converting enzyme-deficient mice. J. Clin. Invest. 106 : 1391–1398, 2001.
- Billet S., Bardin S., Verp S., Baudrie V., Michaud A., Conchon S., Muffat-Joly M., Escoubet B., Souil E., Harmard G., Bernstein K.E., Gasc J-M., Elghozi J-L., Corvol P. and Clauser E. Gain-of-function mutant of angiotensin II receptor, type 1A, causes hypertension and cardiovascular fibrosis in mice. J. Clin. Invest. 117 : 1914–1925, 2007.
- Michaud A., Bur D., Gribouval O., Muller L., Iturrioz X., Clemessy M., Gasc J-M., Gubler M-C. and Corvol P. Loss-of-function point mutations associated with renal tubular dysgenesis provide insights about renin function and cellular trafficking. Hum. Mol. Genet. 20 : 301–311, 2011.
