= Arnold Munnich =

Arnold Munnich (born 9 October 1949, in Paris) is a French paediatrician-geneticist. He is the creator and head of the department of medical genetics at the Necker-Enfants malades hospital in Paris. He was an advisor to the President of the Republic from 2007 to 2012 and a member of the Scientific Council of the AMMi Association.

== Scientific background ==
After a doctorate in medicine (1979) and a science thesis (1988) at the Institut Cochin in the U129 unit then headed by Axel Kahn, he was appointed Professor of Genetics at the University of Paris-Descartes in 1989. He has been head of the Inserm unit "Genetic handicaps of the child" since 1990, succeeding Jean Frézal, where he had done his clinic (1986-1990) at the Necker Hospital in Paris.

After Nicolas Sarkozy was elected President of the French Republic, Arnold Munnich was appointed Advisor to the President for Biomedical Research and Health.

Arnold Munnich has tried to use molecular genetics in paediatrics and to reconcile clinical and molecular genetics. He is the co-founder and current president of the Imagine Institute of Genetic Diseases and a member of the Scientific Council of the AMMi Association.

== Distinctions ==
- 1994: Jean Hamburger Prize of the City of Paris
- 1999: Jean-Pierre-Lecocq Prize from the French Academy of Sciences
- 1999: Eloi-Collery Prize of the National Academy of Medicine
- 2000: Grand Prix de l'Inserm
- 2001: Jean Bernard Prize from the Fondation pour la recherche médicale
- 2003: Member of the Institut Universitaire de France
- 2004: Member of the French Academy of Sciences
- 2007: Winner of the European Society of Human Genetics Award
- 2009: Winner of the Gagna & Van Heck Award of the Belgian National Research Fund
- 2012: Winner of the British Society of Human Genetics Carter Award
- 2013: Officier of the Légion d'Honneur
- 2014: Jean-Bernard Grand Prize of the City of Paris

A 2021 publication found Munnich to be a central researcher for describing rare genetic diseases.

== Books ==
- La Rage d'espérer. La génétique au quotidien, Plon Publishing, 1999 (ISBN 2259189849)
- Programmé mais libre, Plon Editions, 2016 (ISBN 2259230091)

He is the author or co-author of more than 700 scientific publications.
