= William Vainchenker =

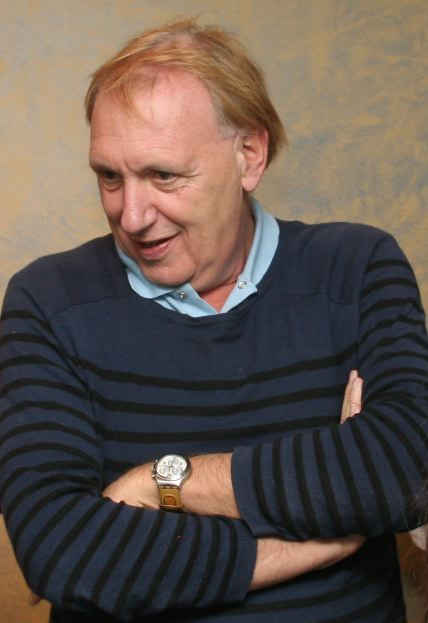
William Vainchenker, member of the French Academy of sciences

William Vainchenker, born on 16 December 1947, is a French medical doctor and researcher. He is considered a specialist in hematopoiesis.

== Biography ==
Vainchenker is director of research at Inserm, Hematopoiesis and Stem Cells Unit, Gustave Roussy Institute, Villejuif.

He is best known for his discoveries in the field of malignant blood diseases and the genetic mechanisms responsible for predisposition to myeloproliferative syndromes and leukaemias.

Vainchenker studied medicine from 1966 to 1971 in Paris VII University and passed his medical thesis in 1977. At the same time, he completed his bachelor's degree in science, then a DEA (master 2) and a postgraduate thesis in science in 1978 in Paris VI University.

He was appointed to the Paris Hospital Boarding School in 1971 and did his hospital internships from 1971 to 1978 with an interruption as a technical assistance cooperator. He then worked as an intern at the Inserm unit headed by Professor Jean Rosa at Henri Mondor Hospital (Créteil) in the team of Jeanine Breton Gorius, where he started working on megacaryocyte differentiation. In 1981, he returned to a university hospital activity in hemato-immunology as head of the clinic in the department of Professor Maxime Seligmann. In 1983, Vainchenker was recruited as research director at Inserm in Professor Jean Rosa's unit. In 1993, he took over the management of an Inserm unit at the Gustave Roussy Institute on the theme of experimental haematology, which he managed until 2010. Vainchenker then remained until now as a researcher in the same Inserm unit at Gustave Roussy. Until now, he has kept a hematology consultation at Saint Louis Hospital.

== Scientific contributions ==
Vainchenker has always worked on megacaryocyte differentiation with the objective of characterizing the mechanisms that regulate this normal that leads to platelet formation and then transposing these data to human pathology. This allowed him to be the first team to identify and characterize the progenitor of the megacaryocyte line, then to define its different steps and apply these data to the characterization of leukaemias. In parallel, his team has shown that GATA1 is a transcription factor that plays a key role not only in erythroblast but also in megacaryocyte differentiation.

A major theme of his team was to characterize the regulatory factors of megakaryopoiesis. They were able to show with Françoise Wendling that the orphan MPL receptor had as ligand a megakaryopoiesis stimulating factor that had all the characteristics of thrombopoietin, a presumptive humoral factor that physiologically regulates platelet production. Thrombopoietin in plasma could then be isolated from its MPL binding by other teams. This allowed them to study in detail: 1) the mechanisms of regulation of plasma thrombopoietin level by the number of platelets in the blood and 2) its function on differentiation, in particular on polyploidization of megacaryocytes. These fundamental results have allowed them to better understand the pathophysiology of different hereditary thrombocytopenia.

Having shown that overexpression of thrombopoietin in mice gave a picture similar to myeloproliferative neoplasm, they focused their research on the pathophysiology of these malignant diseases. This led to the discovery of the JAK2V617F mutation that causes more than 60% of these diseases, in particular more than 90% of Vaquez's Polyglobulias. JAK2 is a kinase associated with cytokine receptors such as MPL or the erythropoietin receptor essential for signalling these receptors and the V617F mutation results in constitutive signalling and is capable of inducing a disease similar to Vaquez's ployglobulia in mice or the erythropoietin receptor essential for the signalling of these receptors and the V617F mutation results in constitutive signalling and is capable of inducing a disease similar to Vaquez's ployglobulia in mice or the erythropoietin receptor essential for the signalling of these receptors and the V617F mutation results to constitutive signalling and is capable of inducing a disease close to Vaquez's ployglobulia in mice or the erythropoietin receptor essential for signalling these receptors and the V617F mutation results in constitutive signalling and is capable of inducing a disease close to Vaquez's ployglobulia in mice. His team then helped to characterize other motor mutations, particularly those of MPL. Most importantly, it has identified the TET2 gene, which can be mutated in association with JAK2V617F in myeloproliferative neoplasms and plays a major role in normal hematopoiesis and in many pathologies. With Stefan Constantinescu's team (Brussels), they showed that calreticulin mutations associated with certain myeloproliferative neoplasms modify the function of this chaperone that binds to MPL to activate signaling via JAK2.

Finally, working on familial myeloproliferative syndromes, they characterized one of the first locus responsible for the predisposition to myeloproliferative neoplasms and leukaemias with high penetration. Vainchenker and his collaborators are studying the mechanism of this predisposition linked to the duplication of five genes.

== Awards and honours ==
Vainchenker is the 1994 winner of the European Haematology Association (EHA) Award and the National Cancer League Award. In 2007, he received the William Dameshek Prize from the American Society of Hematology (ASH) and the Allianz-Institut de France Foundation Research Prize. Finally, in 2014, he received, for his entire career, the Inserm honorary prize of Prix d’Honneur.

He was elected a member of the French Academy of Sciences in December 2013, in the Human Biology and Medical Sciences section. He is Chevalier of the Légion d'Honneur.
