= Jean-Marc Egly =

French researcher (born 1945)

Jean-Marc Egly (born 27 December 1945) is a French molecular biology researcher specialising in the field of transcription. Research Director at Inserm, he was also Chairman of the Scientific Council of the ARC from 2006 to 2011. He is a member of the French Academy of sciences.

== Biography ==
Jean-Marc Egly obtained his doctorate in chemistry in 1971 and a second in biochemistry in 1976 at the Louis-Pasteur University in Strasbourg. In 1985, he became Inserm research director at the IGBMC in Strasbourg, founded by Pierre Chambon. In 1995, he was commissioned by the Secrétaire d'état à la Recherche, Elisabeth Dufourcq, to carry out a mission and prepare a report advocating the creation of the Great Sequencing of the Genome in Evry. In 2005, he was elected a member of the French Academy of sciences. He is also a member of the Scientific Council of the Parliamentary Office for the Assessment of Scientific and Technological Choices (OPECST).

== Scientific contributions ==
Jean-Marc Egly's work focused mainly on describing the mechanisms of transcription at the level of type II RNA polymerase.

== Distinctions ==
2002: Research Prize of the Allianz-Institut de France Foundation.

2004: Grand Prix de la recherche médicale de l'Inserm

2006: Chevalier of the Légion d'honneur

2014: Officier of the Légion d'honneur
