= Dominique Costagliola =

French epidemiologist

- Born: 17 May 1954 (age 71); Asnières-sur-Seine, France
- Education: Pierre and Marie Curie University (Maîtrise); Télécom ParisTech; Paris Diderot University
- Occupation: Epidemiologist

Dominique Costagliola (born 17 May 1954) is a French epidemiologist and biostatistician, deputy director of the Pierre Louis Institute of Epidemiology and Public Health (iPLESP) and is considered a “leading AIDS specialist.”,

== Biography ==
She earned a master's degree in physics from Pierre and Marie Curie University before graduating from Télécom Paris and defending a thesis in biological and medical engineering at Paris Diderot University.

== Career ==
Costagliola began working at Inserm in 1982 and began her research in HIV in 1986.

== Honors ==
- Inserm 2020 Grand Prize
- Inserm Research Prize in 2013
- 1995: Knight of the National Order of Merit
- 2005: Knight of the National Order of the Legion of Honor
- 2006: Louis-Daniel Beauperthuy Prize of the Academy of Sciences
- 2014: Officer of the National Order of the Legion of Honor
- 2017: Member of the Academy of Sciences
