= Yehezkel Ben-Ari =

French neuroscientist specialized in the development of brain disorders

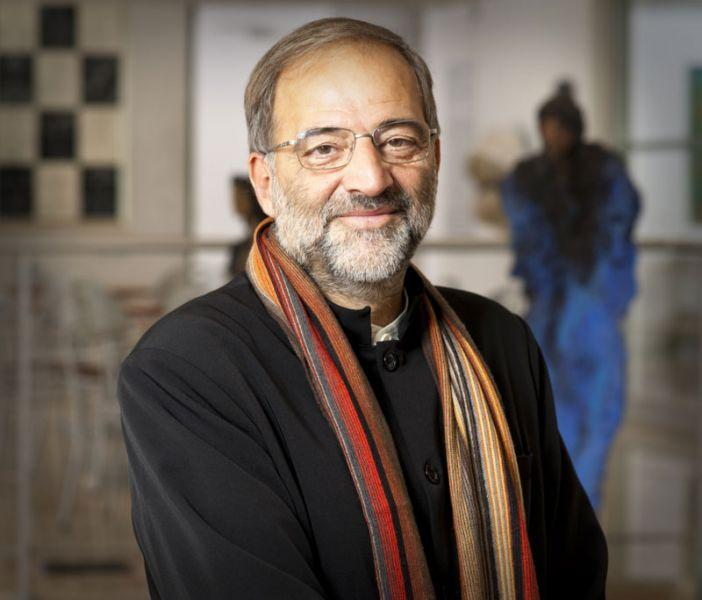
- Born: 1 December 1943 (age 82); Cairo, Egypt
- Education: Hebrew University of Jerusalem; Paris Sorbonne University
- Known for: Work on neurogenesis and neurological pathologies
- Awards: Grand Prix de l'INSERM (2009)
- Scientific career
- Fields: Neuroscience
- Workplaces: Institut de neurobiologie de la Méditerranée de l'INSERM; Neurochlore; B&A Therapeutics; B&A Biomedical; B&A Oncomedical

Yehezkel Ben-Ari (Hebrew: יחזקאל בן ארי; born 1 December 1943) is a neurobiologist specializing in brain development and the development of brain disorders. He has made seminal contributions to the understanding of brain activity in health and disease and notably autism, epilepsies and related infantile disorders.

== Biography ==
Yehezkel Ben-Ari began his academic career at the Hebrew University of Jerusalem in Israel, where he completed his bachelor's and master's degrees. From 1967-1971, he pursued advanced studies at the Institut Marey in Paris, France, completing his PhD with a focus on neuronal plasticity in 1971.

From 1973 to 1980, Ben-Ari undertook several post-doctoral fellowships at prestigious institutions, including Cambridge University, Oslo University, and McGill University in Montreal. Upon his return to France, he was engaged by the Centre National de la Recherche Scientifique (CNRS), where he initially headed a team studying epilepsy at the Alfred Fessart Laboratory of Nervous Physiology.

In 1986, Ben-Ari was appointed as the head of the INSERM U29 unit, "Neurobiology and Pathophysiology of Development," succeeding Professor Alexandre Minkowski. This unit was situated within the Port Royal maternity hospital in Paris. Ben-Ari later moved his entire team to Marseille in 1999, where he established and led the Institut de Neurobiologie de la Méditerranée (INMED) of INSERM, located on the scientific campus of Luminy.

In 2008, after retiring from his leadership role, Ben-Ari shifted his focus towards the creation of several start-up companies. Collaborating with renowned figures like Eric Lemonier, Nouchine Hadjikhani, Constance Hammond, Philippe Damier, and Francois Berger, these start-ups aim to understand and develop treatments for various brain disorders, including Autism Spectrum Disorders, Parkinson's Disease, and brain tumors.

== Scientific achievements ==
Yehezkel Ben-Ari studied in his PhD work neuronal plasticity, recording in vivo neurons in the amygdala and determining with a variety of mathematical tools the modifications of neuronal activity during a classical sensory-sensory random Pavlovian type conditioning. His main discovery was that during conditioning the so called ongoing or spontaneous activity is also modified leading to alterations that precedes the conditional stimulus as if the neuron expected the stimulus to come.

His Post doc in University of Cambridge at the MRC unit of neurochemistry directed by Prof L Iversen was centered on the amygdala where he determined with R Zigmond the levels of Gabaergic and cholinergic markers in substructures of the complex.

In parallel, he recorded with I Kanazawa and JS Kelly neuron in the amygdala in vivo reporting for the first time their activity and responses to a variety of neuroleptics. Yehezkel Ben-Ari also reported -with Kanazawa and Kelly- in Nature the striking effects of acetylcholine on neurons of the reticularis nucleus – a major structure that controls sensory inputs to the cortex.

Returning to France, Yehezkel Ben-Ari formed a team to study epilepsies in Temporal Lobe Epilepsies (TLE) -a pharmaco-resistant type of epilepsies. Studying the action of kainic acid -an epileptogenic agent present in algae – he discovered the animal model of TLE produced by kainic acid that mimicked the main features of TLE including the pattern of damage, the resistance to treatments, and the mechanisms underlying how "seizures beget seizures" due to the formation by propagated seizures of distant seizures foci. The pathogenic reactive form of plasticity generates aberrant synapses that generate more seizures. This general scheme is now considered as a major cause of reactive epilepsies. The review paper published on this domain is the 3rd most quoted paper in the field of epilepsies.

In 1986, Yehezkel Ben-Ari was nominated head of the Unit 29 of INSERM located within Hôpital Cochin-Port-Royal. He started to investigate the properties of immature neurons in rodent brain slices, making the first recording from in utero rodent and later non-human primate brains. These studies led to fundamental evolutionary conserved rules notably the high intracellular level of chloride (CL^{−})_{i} of immature neurons associated with paradoxical excitatory actions of the adult classical inhibitory transmitter GABA, exciting immature neurons and inhibiting adult ones. This underlies the trophic role of GABA that stimulates neuronal growth, synapse and network formation. Yehezkel Ben-Ari then spent the next decades investigating the roles, mechanisms of the developmental GABA shift -that was validated in all animal species from worms to humans- and its clinical implications.

Moving in 1999 to Marseille to the construct INMED – an institute dedicated then to study brain development- he led teams working in this domain showing notably that the GABA shift is reversed in pathological conditions including epilepsies, Autism Spectrum Disorders and other disorders: GABA "again" excites neurons with high chloride level due to enhanced activity of the main chloride importer NKCC1 and reduced activity of the main chloride exporter KCC2. He also discovered that parturition and birth are associated with an abrupt transient reduction of chloride (and polarity of GABA actions) due to the hormone oxytocin that triggers delivery. He then showed that in autism, this shift does not take place -GABA remains excitatory during a highly vulnerable period. These studies led to a flurry of investigations on parturition and birth and the roles of Oxytocin and the impact of these alterations in the pathogenesis of brain disorders.

In 2008, retiring from academic research, Yehezkel Ben-Ari shifted to create startups dedicated to understand and treat brain disorders. He proposed a fundamental concept called the "neuroarcheology concept" according to which in utero insults deviate developmental sequences leading to neurons endowed with immature features that are the final cause of disorders. Therefore, drugs aimed at selectively blocking immature properties -such as high chloride levels and excitatory actions of GABA- are highly suited to pharmaceutically silencing the perturbing neurons.

This hypothesis was first tested in Autism Spectrum Disorders (ASD) by Neurochlore, a startup dedicated to treat ASD. In animal models of ASD, the chloride importer antagonist that reduces (CL^{−})_{i} levels -Bumetanide –restores inhibitory actions of GABA and attenuates behavioral alterations in animal models. With Dr Eric Lemonnier – a psychiatrist treating children with ASD- they performed pilot trials and phase 2A and 2B trials to treat children (3-11 and later 2–18 years old). The differences treated/placebo were statistically significant and the clinical observations were highly positive with an amelioration of social interactions and reduction of agitation. These results were validated in many trials made in China, England, Sweden and Holland with several hundreds of children treated successfully.

In 2021, a final phase 3 was then made (210 children 2-6 and 210 children 7-18yrs old recruited in 40 centers in Europe, Brazil, Australia and US). The results were negative with no difference between placebo and treated children. However, bumetanide responders can be identified in large trials using EEG measures or inflammatory signals suggesting that the treatment is efficient in subpopulations of patients. If bumetanide is indeed efficient in a subpopulation of children it is essential to identify this population to enhance success of future trials and attenuate the severity of clinical signs in a disorder that is orphan of treatments.

Maternity and ASD

Experimental and human investigations indicate that ASD is born in utero. Relying on this, Yehezkel Ben-Ari and his team in BA-biomedical analyzed all maternity data available in French Maternities (roughly 200 parameters) in children with ASD and neurotypical ones in Limoges. The program enabled to identify almost all babies who will not be diagnosed with ASD years later and roughly half those who will be. Interestingly, impacting parameters included expected ones -sex, viral infections etc.- and unexpected ones- earlier upside-down head rotation, femur size 2nd trimester etc. The Cephalic Perimeter (CP) was bigger shortly before birth in future babies with than without ASD. in rodents, the team showed that brain structures and neurons increase size/volumes during parturition and birth in ASD not in naïve rodents. Therefore, major events occurring during in utero growth, parturition and birth are impacted by in ASD.

== Publications ==
Ben-Ari has published over 500 publications in leading scientific journals.

He is amongst the 5 most quoted French Neuroscientists.

== Awards and honours ==
Ben-Ari has won the following awards:

- 2000: Grand Prix Milken of the US Epilepsy Foundation
- 2002: Grand Prix of the Electricity of France (EDF)
- 2006: Prize of the Rotary foundation of France
- 2009: Grand Prix de l'INSERM
- 2009: Honorary Doctor Liège University (Belgium)
- 2010: Grand Prix European Society of Epilepsy
- 2012: Grand Prix Gagne Van Heck Belgian National Scientific Research (FNRS)

== Inmed ==
Ben-Ari is the founder and the first director of the Institute of Neurobiology of the Mediterranean sea (INMED) inaugurated in 2004. The Building was constructed by the Norvegian Snøhetta- who also constructed the library of Alexandria in Egypt and the opera of Oslo, amongst other institutions. INMED is initially based on the migration of virtually all researchers and technicians from Paris (INSERM UNIT 29). In addition to experimental groups and facilities, INMED includes a collection of artwork collected by Yehezkel Ben-Ari during several decades and a special teaching ensemble devoted to lyceum classes preferentially coming from poor neighborhood.
