= Antoine Triller =

- Born: May 23, 1952 (age 74)
- Citizenship: French
- Education: La Pitié-Salpêtrière Hospital
- Awards: Inserm Prize for "Physiology and Physiopathology" (2004); Lamonica Prize (2010); Inserm Honorary Prize (2018)
- Scientific career
- Fields: Neurobiology, Neurophysiology
- Workplaces: Inserm, École normale supérieure
- Doctoral advisor: Henri Korn
- Doctoral students: Cécile Charrier

Antoine Triller (born 23 May 1952) is research director at the Institut national de la santé et de la recherche médicale (Inserm). He is a researcher in neurobiology.

== Biography ==
Antoine Triller has a medical background at the university hospital centre of La Pitié Salpetrière (1978). In Jean Scherrer's laboratory, he turned to neurophysiology and initiated research work on inhibitory synapses with Henri Korn, a specialist in the field.

In 1979, he was recruited as a research associate at Inserm. In 1985, he obtained his PhD in science.

In 1995, he joined the Biology Department of the École normale supérieure where he was in charge of a team. He then created his research unit entitled "Cell Biology of the Synapse" in 1998. Among his doctoral students was Cécile Charrier.

In 2010, he created the Institut de Biologie de l'École normale supérieure, of which he is the director. This institute is the result of the grouping of all biology within the department. Since 2011, he has also been Director of the MemoLife Laboratory of Excellence, whose biology, physics and mathematics teams address memory processes, from genes to neural networks and the mechanisms of evolution.

Triller is the winner of several prizes, including the Inserm prize for "Physiology and Physiopathology" in 2004 and the Lamonica Prize of the French Academy of Sciences in 2010. He was elected a member of the French Academy of sciences in 2011.

He has been President of the Union rationaliste de France since 2019.

== Scientific work ==
By working on the Mauthner cell, a model used in the 1980s to study the quantum release mechanisms of neurotransmitters in the central nervous system, Triller began to focus on the intimate mechanisms of synapses and the molecules that compose them. It works on the development of technological approaches in partnership with physicists. They make it possible to characterize certain structural parameters of quantum release. As early as 1985, he was able to visualize the glycine receptor in the synapses of the central nervous system by electron microscopy and show that neurotransmitter receptors are concentrated in front of the synaptic vesicle release zones. This work has been used as a model to locate most channels and receptors, such as glutamate receptors. Triller demonstrated the possibility of a co-transmission involving two conventional transmitters, glycine and GABA.

He created his laboratory at the École normale supérieure de la rue d'Ulm in 1995 and reoriented his activities towards the study of the molecular and cellular mechanisms that control the recruitment and trafficking of receptors in the synapse. Triller studied GABA and glycine receptors in particular. He showed that the nature of the pre-synaptic neurotransmitter determined the type of receptor accumulating in the post synaptic density. In addition, using electron microscopy, he was able to demonstrate the presence of messenger RNAs encoding the glycine receptor in dendrites.

In 2003, in partnership with physicists, he developed the use of "quantum dots" for cellular neurobiology. This technological advance makes it possible to move from static imaging of molecules to a very high resolution dynamic approach. It is the subject of a founding article in Science that highlights multiple molecular mechanisms responsible for regulating these movements and ultimately the intensity of information transmission between neurons. Triller has contributed to a new understanding of the mechanisms of addressing stability and plasticity of the synapse, making it possible to broaden pharmacological approaches to neural dysfunctions.

One of Triller's contributions has been to demonstrate that these fundamental mechanisms are deregulated in neurodegenerative diseases such as Alzheimer's and Parkinson's.

== Awards and honours ==
- 1995: Winner of the "Foundation for Medical Research "
- 2004: Award from the French Atomic Energy Commission: Great Prize of the French Academy of Sciences
- 2004: Inserm Prize "Physiology and Physiopathology "
- 2010: Lamonica Prize in Neurology: Grand Prize of the Academy of Sciences
- 2011: Medical Research Prize of the Association France Alzheimer
- 2018: Inserm Honorary Prize
