= Alain Prochiantz =

French professor and neurobiologist

Alain Prochiantz (born 17 December 1948 in Paris) is a neurobiology researcher and professor at the Collège de France, of which he became director from 2015 to 2019.

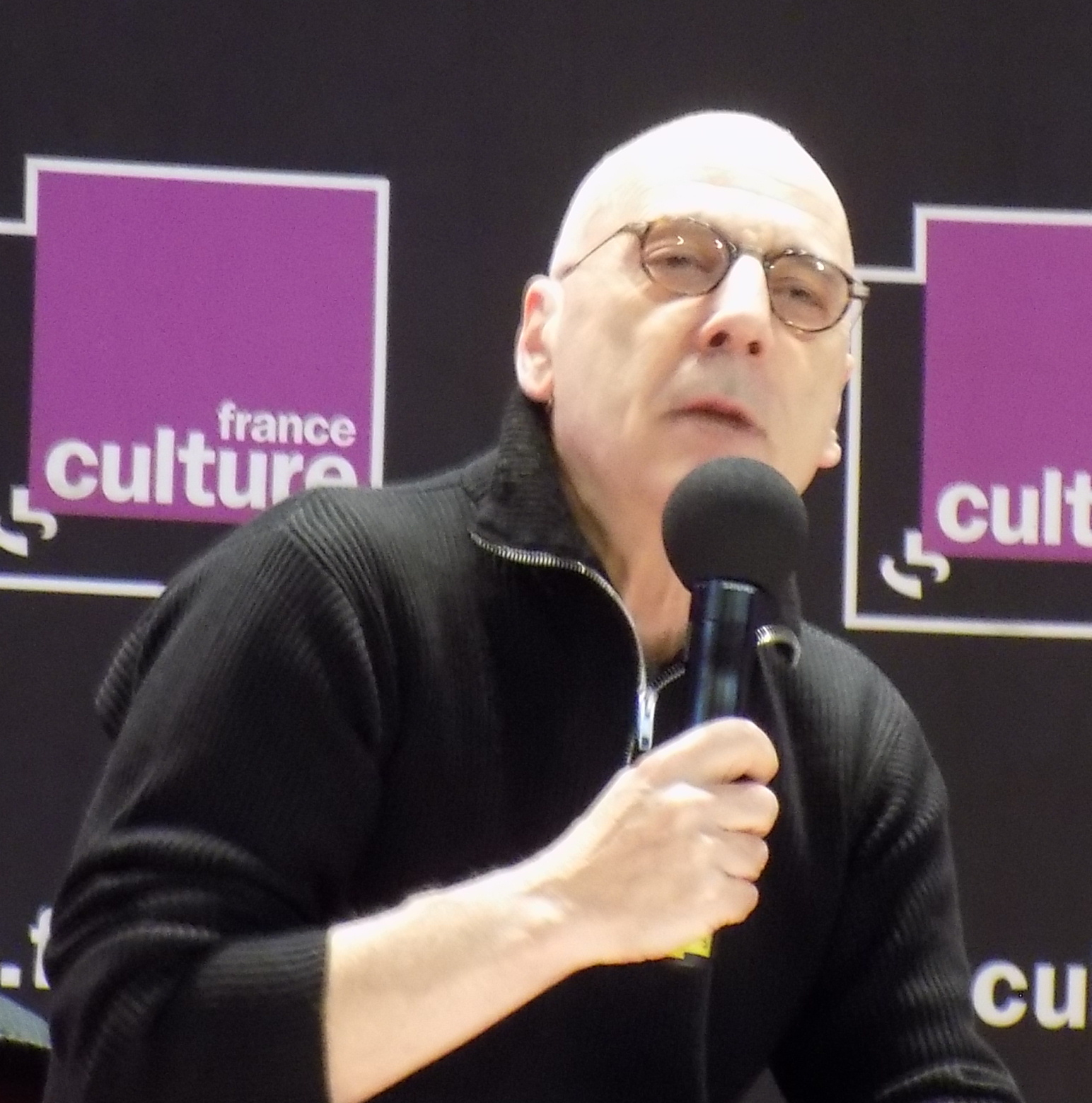
Alain Prochiantz at "L'année vue par les sciences" forum organized by France Culture on 13 February 2016

== Biography ==
Alain Prochiantz is a former student of the École normale supérieure (1969). After a science thesis obtained in 1976 in the field of genetic translation, he turned towards neurobiology by working with Jacques Glowinski and became a research fellow (1978–1981) and then research director (1982-2007) at the CNRS. He was appointed head of the Biology Department at the École normale supérieure, which he kept until 2006, when he became the holder of the "Morphogenetic Processes" chair at the Collège de France in 2007.

He has also been a member of the French Academy of Sciences since 18 November 2003 and chairman of the Research Committee of the Foundation for Medical Research (FRM). In 2011, he received the Inserm Grand Prix de l'Inserm for all his work.

Alain Prochiantz is also the author of numerous scientific articles and books on the brain; he participates in scientific theatre productions with his friend Jean-François Peyret. Together, they are collaborating on the writing of the play Ex vivo / In vitro, premiered at the Théâtre de la Colline in November 2011.

Alain Prochiantz served as director of the Collège de France from 2015 to 2019.

== Scientific contributions ==
Alain Prochiantz has been working since the early 1980s in the field of molecular neurobiology, particularly on the processes of morphogenesis and nerve cell differentiation. He did his first major work at the Collège de France with Jacques Glowinski on the development and in vitro maturation of dopaminergic neurons in the mesencephalon.

His laboratory having moved to the École normale supérieure, he then became interested in the molecular signals responsible for certain neuronal morphogenesis processes and, in 1991, highlighted in particular the role of homeoboxes of certain transcription factors (but also of different extracellular matrix proteins such as tenascin, glycoaminoglycans...) in these phenomena.

As was then fully accepted in the scientific community, he proposes that cascades of regulation of homeotic genes (of the Hox family) are potentially involved in many stages of neuronal differentiation, neurite growth, neuronal polarity... However, going against a certain number of knowledge, or even dogmas in the field of molecular biology, he reports that domains of transcription factors, or even whole proteins such as Hox5, can be internalized in a cell and therefore suggests the possible secretion of a given transcription factor by a nerve cell A that can be internalized by a neighbouring cell B and have a biological effect on it. To clearly demonstrate this, he and his team are interested in the homeoprotein Engrailed of the Hox gene family involved in the morphogenesis of brain structures and demonstrate that it also has an intracellular location in secretion vesicles.

The first key publication supporting this theory was in 1998 with the in vitro demonstration that a large proportion of the nuclear transcription factor Engrailed is effectively secreted in the extracellular medium by Cos cells and recaptured by cocultured neurons acting as a potential intercellular peptide messenger. These articles were published in good biology journals but not in the forefront because the data were relatively contested by the scientific community. These discoveries will take some time to be recognized. His team then demonstrated the involvement of Engrailed-1/2 proteins in the development and survival of dopaminergic neurons by using heterozygous mouse models (En1+/-) for them and by proposing a mechanism of action on the transcriptional activation of the Ndufs1 and Ndufs3 subunits of complex I of the mitochondrial respiratory chain.

Alain Prochiantz continues his work in evolutionary developmental genetics and directs his research towards the physiological aspects of his fundamental molecular discoveries, particularly for the understanding of neuronal plasticity and axonal guidance processes.

== Awards and honours ==
- 2001: Research Prize of the Allianz-Institut de France Foundation.
- 2011: Grand Prix de l'Inserm

== Books ==
- Les Stratégies de l'embryon, PUF, 1987, (ISBN 978-2-13-041422-3)
- La Construction du cerveau, Hachette, 1989, (ISBN 978-2-01-235028-1)
- Claude Bernard : la révolution physiologique, PUF, 1990
- La Biologie dans le boudoir, éditions Odile Jacob, 1995, (ISBN 978-2-7381-0316-1)
- Les Anatomies de la pensée - À quoi pensent les calamars ?, éditions Odile Jacob, 1997, (ISBN 978-2-7381-0448-9)
- Machine-esprit, éditions Odile Jacob, 2001, (ISBN 9782738109163)
- La Génisse et le Pythagoricien - Traité des formes, Alain Prochiantz et Jean-François Peyret, éditions Odile Jacob, 2002, (ISBN 978-2-7381-1210-1)
- Les Variations Darwin, Jean-François Peyret et Alain Prochiantz, coll. « Sciences », éditions Odile Jacob, 2005, (ISBN 978-2-7381-1559-1)
- Géométries du vivant, coll. « Leçons inaugurales du Collège de France », éditions Fayard, 2008, (ISBN 978-2-213-63501-9).
- Darwin : 200 ans, coll. « Collège de France », éditions Odile Jacob, 2010, (ISBN 978-2-7381-2522-4).
- Génétique, évolution, développement, éditions De vive voix, 2010, (ISBN 978-2-84684-099-6).
- Qu'est-ce que le vivant ?, coll. « Les Livres du Nouveau Monde », éditions du Seuil, 2012, (ISBN 9782021026733).
- Singe toi-même, éditions Odile Jacob, (ISBN 9782738146991), 2019.
