= Jean-Claude Weill =

French biologist and immunologist

Jean-Claude Weill (born 14 August 1941), is a French biologist, immunologist and member of the French Academy of Sciences.

== Personal ==
Jean-Claude Weill is the son of Jean-Paul Weill, a lawyer at the Paris Court of Appeal, an officer of the Legion of Honour and holder of a war cross (1940–1945), and Denise Maier. He is the brother of Guy Weill, who died accidentally on 6 May 1966. Weill was married to Claudia Duxbury with whom he has a daughter Samantha Weill-Philippe (a psychoanalyst), and he subsequently married the lawyer, Frederique Pons.

== Career ==
=== Education ===
- 1980 Doctorate (biochemistry, University of Paris 7, Paris, France)
- 1968 Doctor of Dentistry – Faculty of Medicine (Paris)
- 1965 Master's Degree in Biochemistry – University at Buffalo, New York City

=== Positions ===
Since 2014, Weill has been the Scientific co-director of the "Development of the immune system" team. Institut Necker-Enfants Malades Inserm U1151-CNRS in Paris. From 2001 to 2013, Weill was Scientific Co-Directorate of Inserm U783 "Development of the immune system" in the Faculty of Medicine Paris Descartes. Positions previous to that include:

- 1992–2000 Director of Inserm U373 "Development of the immune system".
- 1987–1991 Permanent member of the Basel Institute of Immunology (Basel, Switzerland)
- 1982–1987 Group Leader "Molecular Immundifferentiation" (Inserm Research Director), Jacques Monod Institute, Paris
- 1977–1982 Scientific Research Officer (Inserm), Jacques Monod Institute (Paris)
- 1972–1977 Research Scientist, Institute of Immunobiology, Broussais Hospital (Paris) (Prof. Bernard Halpern)
- 1963–1965 Master's student, Department of Biochemistry, New York State University, Buffalo, United States

=== Works ===
Weill's entire career has been spent in collaboration with Claude-Agnès Reynaud, who she met in Klaus Sherrer's laboratory at the Institut Jacques Monod, he is interested in the mechanisms of formation of the immunoglobulin repertoire, highlighting new mechanisms such as gene conversion in birds, or the use of the somatic hypermutation process in ruminants in the formation of the preimmune repertoire. These strategies are accompanied by localized lymphocyte differentiation mainly in lymphoid tissues associated with the intestine. Their more recent work has focused on the molecular mechanisms of the hypermutation process of immunoglobulin genes, by describing the role played by mutagenic DNA polymerases in this process, as well as the mechanisms of immune memory formation, and the description of lymphocyte subpopulations in humans with similarities in their formation mode to that of B cells described in birds or ruminants.

Jean-Claude Weill is the author of a large number of scientific articles.

== Memberships ==
- 2011 Member of the French Academy of sciences
- 2005 "Honorary Member" of the American Association of Immunologists
- 2000 Honorary Professor at the Institut Universitaire de France (IUF)
- 1993 Elected member of EMBO

== Honours ==
- 2018 Sanofi-Institut Pasteur International Senior Award (with Claude-Agnes Reynaud)
- 2017 Inserm Honorary Prize (with Claude-Agnes Reynaud)
- 1997 Jean-Pierre Lecocq Prize from the French Academy of sciences (with Claude-Agnes Reynaud)
- 1993 Lucien Tartois Prize from the Foundation for Medical Research
