= André Vaillant =

French linguist (1890–1977)

- Born: 3 November 1890; Soissons, French Third Republic
- Died: 23 April 1977 (aged 86); Paris, France

Academic background
- Education: École Normale Supérieure

Academic work
- Institutions: Collège de France; Institute of Slavic Studies
- Main interests: Slavic languages, particularly Old Church Slavonic

André Vaillant (November 3, 1890 – April 23, 1977), was a French linguist, philologist and grammarian who also specialized in Slavic languages.

He was born in Soissons. After studying at École Normale Supérieure in Paris, he became professor at the Collège de France, acting as a Chair of Slavic Languages and Literatures in 1952.

In Russia, he studied manuscripts written in Old Church Slavonic. He worked at the Institute of Slavic Studies of Paris. He collaborated in the drafting of the Revue d'études slaves (Journal of Slavic Studies) which served as the basis for the development of his comparative grammar of Slavic languages.

He wrote twenty books including the six-volume Comparative Grammar of Slavic languages (Grammaire comparée des langues slaves), the two-volume Handbook of Old Church Slavonic (Manuel de vieux-slave) and a grammar of Serbo-Croatian together with Antoine Meillet.

He translated and published many liturgical texts written in Church Slavonic.

He died in Paris.

== Selected works ==
- Histoire et philologie. Langues et littératures slaves du Moyen Âge / André Vaillant / Paris : EPHE École Pratique des Hautes Études - 1965
- Histoire et philologie. Langues et littératures slaves du Moyen Âge / André Vaillant / Paris : EPHE École Pratique des Hautes Études - 1969
- Pascal Pierre et Johannet José, André Vaillant (1890-1977), l’homme et le savant, Revue des études slaves, t. 53, 1981, fasc. 3, p. 367-370.
- Les "Piesni razlike" de Dominko Zlatarić, thèse complémentaire pour le doctorat ès lettres présentée à la Faculté des lettres de l'Université de Paris, par André Vaillant.
- Grammaire comparée des langues slaves. Tome I, Phonétique. Lyon, I.A.C., 1950.
- Grammaire comparée des langues slaves. Tome II, Morphologie. Première partie, Flexion nominale. Lyon : I.A.C, 1958.
- Grammaire comparée des langues slaves. Tome II, Morphologie. Deuxième partie, Flexion pronominale. Lyon : I.A.C, 1958.
- Grammaire comparée des langues slaves. Tome III, Le verbe. Paris : Klincksieck, 1966.
- Grammaire comparée des langues slaves. Tome IV, La Formation des noms. Paris : Klincksieck, 1974.
- Grammaire comparée des langues slaves. Tome V, La syntaxe. Paris : Klincksieck, 1977
- Manuel du vieux slave. Tome I, Grammaire. Seconde édition revue et augmentée. Paris, 1964.

== Sources ==
- Tributes André Vaillant on the Persée website
- Selected bibliography of André Vaillant
- André Vaillant at the Slavic Studies Center at the University of Paris-Sorbonne
