= Geneviève Almouzni =

French biologist

- Born: 1960 (age 65–66); Algeria
- Education: École normale supérieure de Fontenay-aux-Roses; Université Pierre-et-Marie-Curie
- Occupation: Biologist

Geneviève Almouzni (born 1960) is a French biologist, a specialist in epigenetics and director of the Curie Institute's research centre.

== Biography ==
Geneviève Almouzni was born in Algeria and studied at the École normale supérieure de Fontenay-aux-Roses from 1980 to 1985. In 1988, she defended a thesis in microbiology at the Université Pierre-et-Marie-Curie on the use of a system derived from xenope eggs to study DNA chromatin replication and assembly under the supervision of Marcel Méchali.

From 1988 to 1989 and 1991 to 1993, she went to the United States to work as a post-doc in the research centre of the National Institutes of Health in Bethesda, in the laboratory of Professor Alan Wolffe.She has been a research director at the CNRS since January 2000.

In 2013, she took over the direction of research at the Institut Curie and became the third woman to hold this position after Marie Curie and Irène Joliot-Curie. She served on the Life Sciences jury for the Infosys Prize in 2013. She was Chair of EU-LIFE (2018-2019), the alliance of research institutes advocating for excellent research in Europe. Geneviève Almouzni is also a member of the editorial board of Cell magazine.

== Scientific work ==
Her research focuses on cancer prevention, including the role of certain proteins in tumor development. Geneviève Almouzni studies the transmission of genetic and epigenetic information in eukaryotic cells, particularly through chromatin assembly mechanisms, and the impact of potential errors at this level of regulation, particularly on cancer.

== Awards and honours ==
- 2000 CNRS silver medal
- 2011 Chevalier of the Légion d'Honneur
- 2013 FEBS/EMBO Women in Science Award for her research work in the field of epigenetics, in particular the role of histones and chromatin in controlling gene activity
- 2013 elected to the American Association for the Advancement of Science
- 2013 elected to the French Academy of sciences since December 10, 2013
- 2016 Officier of the Légion d'Honneur
