= Bernard Malissen =

French researcher and immunologist

Bernard Malissen, born on 29 November 1953 in Agen, is a French biology researcher specialising in immunology. Research Director at the CNRS, he was also Director of the Marseille-Luminy Immunology Centre from 1995 to 2005.

== Biography ==
Bernard Malissen obtained his PhD in science in 1982. He joined the CNRS, where he worked with François Kourilsky and Claude Mawas. For many years, he headed an Inserm research unit in Marseille-Luminy. In 1995, he became Director of the Marseille-Luminy Immunology Centre. In 2003, he was elected a member of the French Academy of Sciences.

Bernard Malissen is the founder and director of the Centre for Immunophenomics (CIPHE).

== Scientific contributions ==
Bernard Malissen's work focused mainly on describing the genetic recombination mechanisms that allow the synthesis of T-cell receptors (TCR) - the surface receptor that triggers cell differentiation of the T-cell that carries it and contributes to the body's defences against infectious agents or tumours - and on studying their three-dimensional structure.

In the 1980s, he also developed gene transfer approaches to reconstruct the TCR multi-molecular complex from scratch to study how it induces T lymphocyte activation, and then his team developed transgenic mouse models to study T cell development and function in their physiological context.

Using functional genomics tools, Bernard Malissen was able to describe the different types of dendritic cells - which are responsible for capturing and presenting T cell antigens particularly effectively - present in tissues such as skin and how they perform sentinel functions. To understand the complexity of signal transduction networks involved in the activation of T cells and dendritic cells, Bernard Malissen is currently using so-called "omics" approaches to simultaneously measure a large number of parameters and describe how T lymphocytes function under normal and pathological conditions.

== Awards and honours ==
- 1982: CNRS Bronze medal
- 1986: Prize of the Foundation for Medical Research
- 1988: Bernard Halpern Prize
- 1996: CNRS silver medal
- 2005: Grand Prix de la recherche médicale de l'Inserm
- 2018: Grand Prize of the Foundation for Medical Research
