= Michel Le Moal =

French neuropsychiatrist and neuroscientist

- Born: September 28, 1934 (age 91); Le Havre, France
- Occupation: Neuropsychiatrist

Michel Le Moal (born 28 September 1934) is a French neuropsychiatrist and neuroscientist from Le Havre. In France, he is considered to be the first to research the establishing relationships between behavior and neuroscience, as well as creating an integrative neurobiology.

== Biography ==
As a pupil of the Nation (Rocroi Court, 1943), he completed his secondary studies in Givet, the Lycée Henri IV, then at the Lycée de Brest. He was admitted to SPCN at the Faculty of Sciences in Paris (1952), then enrolled in a preparatory class (Brest Maritime Hospital) before being admitted to National School of the Marine Health Service in 1954. At the same time, he continued his medical studies at the Faculty of Medicine. His studies were interrupted for a period of treatment at Sanatorium, Isère. In 1968 he decided to focus on what was still an emerging field, neuropsychiatry. He then specialized in child neuropsychiatry. le Moal also has a Bachelor of Arts degree in Philosophy and Psychology, a Bachelor of Science degree in Chemistry—Physiology.

From 1964 onwards, he was an assistant before becoming an assistant professor at the Faculty of Science in Bordeaux. From 1975 to 1976, he was a postdoctoral fellow at the J. Olds' Laboratory in the California Institute of Technology (Caltech). From 1976 to 2005, he was a professor of Neurosciences. From 1980 to 2004, he was the Director of Studies at the École Pratique des Hautes Études in Experimental Psychopathology (EPHE 3rd section). From 1993 to 2003, he was a member of the Institut Universitaire de France.

As Professor Emeritus at the University of Bordeaux, he headed several CNRS and Inserm units, designed, and directed the Institut François Magendie de Neurosciences (Inserm - CNRS). Le Moal is considered to be the French pioneer of research aimed at integrating neurobiology by establishing relationships between behaviour and neuroscience. In order to understand the transition from adaptation to disadaptation, he laid the foundations for experimental psychopathology. He has been a member of the French Academy of sciences since 2005. He received the ECNP Neuropsychopharmacology Award in 2005.

== Distinctions ==
- Chevalier of the Ordre de la Légion d'Honneur.
- Chevalier in the Ordre du Mérite.
- Commandeur of the Ordre des Palmes Académiques.

== Other significant events ==
- 1977-1979: Creation, Management, Laboratory of Psychophysiology CNRS ERA 416.
- 1979-1982: Creation, Management, CNRS own laboratory, LP 82–31, Laboratory of Behavioural Neurobiology.
- 1983-2004: Creation, Management, Inserm Laboratory (U 259) affiliated to Inserm and CNRS.
- 1987-1990: Creation, Direction of the master's degree, then of the DEA and the Doctoral School, Bordeaux.
- 1995: Creation, Management of the Federal Institute of Clinical and Experimental Neurosciences (IFR 8 Inserm, IFR 13 CNRS).
- 1996: Creation, Management of the Institut François Magendie de Neurosciences.

== Research themes and scientific contributions ==
He attempts to explain the relationship to drugs by integrating an individual's history and education at a cellular level in the brain.

Le Moal resided in the United States since the late 1970s as progress in behavioural neuroscience and psychiatric research was rapid. At Caltech, he how to record animals without movement using multiple intracerebral computer.

From 1974 to 1980, his publications focused on:

- the role of a ventral neural system including the neurotransmitters dopamine, norepinephrine, or serotonin, in motivational processes; stimulation (intracerebral self-stimulation) causes attention arousal, pleasure phenomena, and injury to the system causes the inability to focus and uncontrolled hyperactivity.
- the functional roles of dopaminergic systems in their frontal cortical projections; identification of memory syndromes resulting from their local lesions and their specific intracerebral stimulation and blockages; analysis of the neural bases of individual and species survival behaviours; discovery of the central roles of the CRF and vasopressin in adaptive behaviours.

From 1980 to 1995, he based his research on the modalities of the transition from normal to pathological with behavioural analysis and their measurements. The research studies the consequences of harmful environments and aggressions (stress) and proposes the measurement of specific markers acting centrally (including the stress system and its central receptors, the neurons involved).

From 1995 to 2005, in continuity with previous results, Le Moal focused his teams' work on a fundamental question of psychopathology: why some subjects succumb to it while others do not or show resilience and began studying the causes of interindividual, genetic, developmental and environmental differences. The underlying neuro-adaptive processes will be studied on the basis of vulnerability to addictions, the effects of chronic stress, and pathological aging.

== Publications ==
=== Articles published in Nature or Science ===
- Le Moal M., Stinus L., Simon H. Increased sensitivity to (+) amphetamine self-administered by rats following meso—cortico-limbic dopamine neurone destruction. Nature, 1979, 280, 156–158.
- Simon H., Scatton B., Le Moal M. Dopaminergic A10 neurons are involved in cognitive functions. Nature, 1980, 286, 150–151.
- Le Moal M., Koob G., Koda L.Y., Bloom F.E., Manning M, Sawyer W.H., Rivier J., Vasopressor receptor antagonist prevents behavioural effects of vasopressin. Nature, 1981, 291, 491–493.
- Sutton R.E., Koob G.E., Le Moal M., Rivier J., Vale W. Corticotropin releasing factor produces behavioural activation in rats. Nature, 1982, 297, 332–333.
- Tassin J.P., Simon H., Hervé D., Blanc D., Le Moal M., Glowinski J., Bockaert J. Non- dopaminergic fibres may regulate dopamine-sensitive adenylate cyclase in the prefrontal cortex and nucleus accumbens. Nature, 1982, 295, 696–698.
- Koob G.F., Dantzer R., Rodriguez F., Bloom F.E., Le Moal M., Osmotic stress mimics effects of vasopressin on learned behavior. Nature, 1985, 316, 750–752.
- Piazza P.V., Deminière J.M., Le Moal M., Simon H., Factors that predict individual vulnerability to amphetamine self-administration. Science, 1989, 245, 1511–1513.
- Koob G.F., Le Moal M. Drug abuse : hedonic homeostatis dysregulation. Science, 1997, 278, 52–58.
- Cabib S., Orsini C., Le Moal M., Piazza P.V. Abolishment and reversal of genetic differences in behavioral responses to drugs of abuse after a short-lived experience. Science, 2000, 289, 463–465.
- Koob G.F., Le Moal M. Reward neurocircuitry plasticity and the « dark side » of drug addiction. Nat. Neuroscience, 2005, 8, 1442–1444.

=== In general journals ===
- Le Moal M., Simon H. Dopamine mesocorticolimbic network : functional and regulatory roles. Physiol. Rev., 1991, 71, 155–234.
- Abrous D.N., Koehl M., Le Moal M. Adult neurogenesis : from precursors to network and physiology. Physiol. Rev., 2005, 85, 523–569.
- Piazza P.V., Le Moal M. Pathophysiological basis of vulnerability to drug abuse: role of an interaction between stress, glucocorticoids and dopaminergic neurons. Ann. Rev. Pharm. Toxicol., 1996, 36, 359–378.
- Piazza P.V., Le Moal M. Glucocorticoids as a biological substrate of reward: physiological and pathophysiological implications. Brain Res. Rev., 1997, 25, 359–372.
- Piazza P.V., Le Moal M. The role of stress in drug self-administration. Trends in Pharmacol. Sci., 1998, 19, 67-74
- Vallée M., Mayo W., Le Moal M. Role of neurosteroids in cognitive aging. Brain Res. Rev, 2001, 37, 301–312.
- Koob G.F., Le Moal M. Addiction and the Brain Anti-Reward System. Ann Rev Psychol, 2008, 59, 29–53.

==== Main books and lectures ====
- Encyclopedia of Behavioral Neuroscience. Le Moal M. (en collaboration avec Koob G.F. et Thompson R.), (Eds). Academic Press, 3 volumes, 2012, 1816 p.
- Dictionnaire de Psychologie. Doron R., Parot F., Anzieu D., Bronckart J.P., Le Moal M., Lévi-Leboyer C., Moser G., Richelle M., Widlöcher D. (Eds), PUF, 2012 (2^{ème} édition), 768 p.
- Neurobiology of Addiction. Le Moal M. (en collaboration avec Koob G.F.). Academic Press - Elsevier (1^{re} édition 2006), 500 p., 2^{ème} édition (fin 2017), 3 volumes.
- Drugs, Addiction and the Brain. Le Moal M. (en collaboration avec Koob G.F. and Arends M.). Academic Press - Elsevier, 2014, 342 p.
