= Maîtrise (degree) =

- Acronym: Maîtrise
- Type: Master's degree (but not equivalent to a French master's degree)
- Duration: One year
- Prerequisites: Licentiate (degree)

The maîtrise, or the one-year master's degree, is a French national diploma awarded by the French higher education system, created in 1966 and validating one year's study after the licence (the bachelor's degree in France). It is a level 6 qualification in the National Professional Qualifications Register (RNCP) and is worth 60 ECTS credits.

Following the reform of the licence-master-doctorat programme between 2002 and 2006 as part of the Bologna Process, the maîtrise (one-year master's degree) is merged into the two-year master's program (called "master"). The maîtrise diploma can still be awarded as an intermediate degree on request. It corresponds to the first year of the French master's degree, which takes two years to complete.

In Quebec, a maîtrise is a master's degree and is therefore the equivalent of a French master's degree in two years.

== History ==
=== Medieval period: Maîtrise ès Arts (Master of Arts) ===
The degree of Master of Arts traces its origins to the teaching license or Licentia docendi of the University of Paris, designed to produce "masters" who were graduate teachers of their subjects.

The origin of the term ‘maîtrise ès arts’ comes from the University of Paris, where a degree known as the maîtrise was awarded on completion of studies in the Faculty of Arts of the University of Paris. Unlike the baccalauréat and licence (bachelor's degree), which existed in all four faculties of Paris (arts, medicine, theology and law), the maîtrise existed only in the Faculty of Arts. The maîtrise ès arts was obtained after the licence ès arts (Bachelor of Arts) and, unlike the licence, which was conferred by the chancellor of Notre-Dame and gave the right to teach, it was a rather honorary degree indicating the graduate's recognition within the university community and opening the way to studies in the higher faculties.

=== Contemporary era: the maîtrise diploma ===
In 1966, the ‘Fouchet’ reform abolished the preparatory postgraduate certificates (certificats d'études supérieures préparatoires or certificats propédeutiques) and replaced them with the university diploma in scientific studies and the university diploma in literary studies. In addition, the maîtrise complements the licence in the second cycle of humanities faculties. It is a level II qualification according to the old 1969 nomenclature (level 6 in the National Professional Qualifications Register).

Since the implementation of the Licence-Master-Doctorat reform between 2003 and 2006, students with a licence can continue their studies to obtain a French master's degree, a two-year course. Universities accredited to award the Master's degree are also accredited to award, at the intermediate level, the maîtrise diploma "in the relevant field of study", once the student has successfully completed the first year.

== See also ==
- Education in France
- List of universities and colleges in France
- Bologne Process
- Master's degree (France)
