= Collège de France =

Higher education and research establishment in Paris, France

Coordinates: 48°50′57″N 002°20′44″E

- Coat of arms of the Collège de France, given by Louis XIV with letters patent in 1699
- Latin: Collegium Franciæ Regium
- Former names: Collège royal, Collège national, Collège impérial
- Motto: Docet omnia (Latin)
- Motto in English: Teaches all
- Type: Public
- Established: 1530; 496 years ago (royal charter)
- Founder: Francis I of France
- Affiliations: PSL University, Consortium Couperin
- Administrator: Thomas Römer
- Academic staff: 47 chairs (2016)
- Location: Paris, France
- Campus: Urban
- Website: www.college-de-france.fr

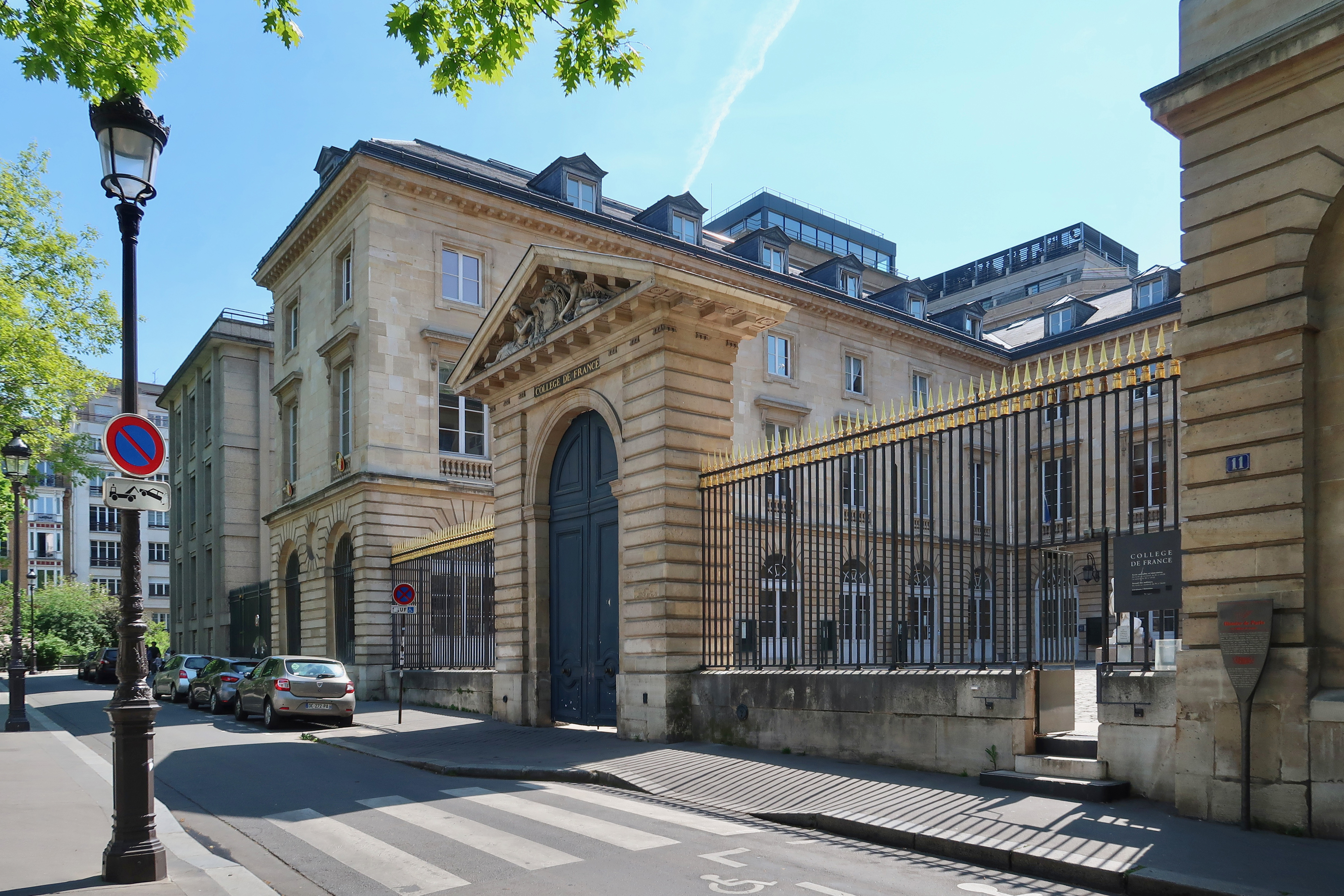
The primary entrance to the Collège de France

The Collège de France (French pronunciation: [kɔlɛʒ də fʁɑ̃s]; formerly known as Collège royal or Collège impérial or Collège des trois langues), founded in 1530 by Francis I of France, is a higher education and research establishment (grand établissement) in France. It is located in Paris near La Sorbonne. The Collège de France has been considered to be France's most prestigious research establishment. It is an associate member of PSL University.

Research and teaching are closely linked at the Collège de France, whose ambition is to teach "the knowledge that is being built up in all fields of literature, science and the arts".

== Overview ==
As of 2021, 21 Nobel Prize winners and 9 Fields Medalists have been affiliated with the Collège. It does not grant degrees. Each professor is required to give lectures where attendance is free and open to anyone. Professors, about 50 in number, are chosen by the professors themselves, from a variety of disciplines, in both science and the humanities. The motto of the Collège is Docet Omnia, Latin for "It teaches everything"; its goal is to "teach science in the making" and can be best summed up by Maurice Merleau-Ponty's phrase: "Not acquired truths, but the idea of freely-executed research" which is inscribed in golden letters above the main hall.

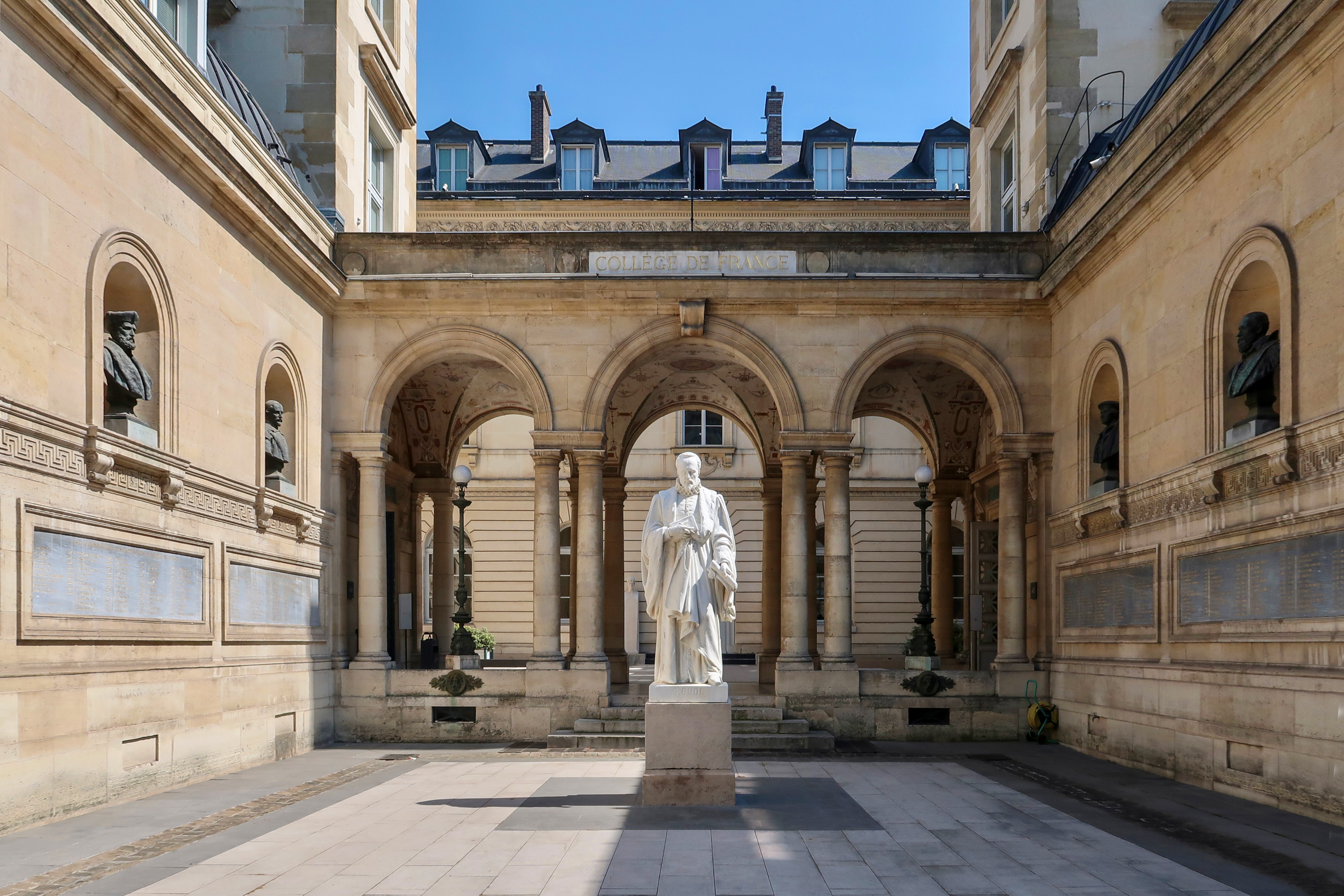
The courtyard of the Collège de France

The Collège houses research laboratories and an extensive network of specialized research libraries, with collections focusing on chemistry, physics, social sciences, humanities, and history, the latter of which includes rare books.

As of June 2009, over 650 audio podcasts of Collège de France lectures are available on iTunes. Some are also available in English and Chinese. Similarly, the Collège de France's website hosts several videos of classes. The classes are followed by various students, from senior researchers to PhD or master's students, or even undergraduates. Moreover, the "leçons inaugurales" (first lessons) are important events in Paris intellectual and social life and attract a very large public of curious Parisians.

== History ==
The Collège was established by King Francis I of France, modeled after the Collegium Trilingue in Louvain, at the urging of Guillaume Budé. Of humanist inspiration, the school was established as an alternative to the Sorbonne to promote such disciplines as Hebrew, Ancient Greek (the first teacher being the celebrated scholar Janus Lascaris) and Mathematics. Initially called "Collège royal", and later "Collège des trois langues" (Latin, ancient Greek and Hebrew), "Collège national", and "Collège impérial", it was named "Collège de France" in 1870. In 2010, it became a founding associate of PSL Research University (a community of Parisian universities).

== Administrators ==
- 1800–1823: Louis Lefèvre‑Gineau
- 1824–1838: Antoine Isaac Silvestre de Sacy
- 1838–1840: Louis Thénard
- 1840–1848: Jean-Antoine Letronne
- 1848–1852: Jules Barthélemy-Saint-Hilaire
- 1852–1853: Xavier de Portets
- 1853–1854: Jacques Rinn
- 1854–1873: Stanislas Julien
- 1873–1883: Édouard René de Laboulaye
- 1883–1892: Ernest Renan
- 1892–1894: Gaston Boissier
- 1894–1903: Gaston Paris
- 1903–1911: Émile Levasseur
- 1911–1929: Maurice Croiset
- 1929–1936: Joseph Bédier
- 1937–1955: Edmond Faral
- 1955–1965: Marcel Bataillon
- 1966–1974: Étienne Wolff
- 1974–1980: Alain Horeau
- 1980–1991: Yves Laporte
- 1991–1997: André Miquel
- 1997–2000: Gilbert Dagron
- 2000–2006: Jacques Glowinski
- 2006–2012: Pierre Corvol
- 2012–2015: Serge Haroche
- 2015–2019: Alain Prochiantz
- Since 2019: Thomas Römer

== Faculty ==
The faculty of the Collège de France currently comprises fifty-two professors, elected by the Professors themselves from among francophone scholars in subjects including mathematics, physics, chemistry, biology, history, archaeology, linguistics, oriental studies, philosophy, the social sciences and other fields. Two chairs are reserved for foreign scholars who are invited to give lectures.

== Notable faculty ==
Notable faculty members include Serge Haroche, awarded with Nobel Prize in Physics in 2012. Notably, eight Fields Medal winners have been affiliated with the College.

- Jean-Pierre Abel-Rémusat, sinologist
- Raymond Aron, philosopher, social theorist, journalist.
- Jean François Boissonade de Fontarabie, classical scholar
- Étienne Baluze, historiographer
- Roland Barthes, literary theorist, philosopher, critic
- Simon Baudichon, physician
- Émile Benveniste, structural linguist, semiotician
- Henri Bergson, philosopher
- Claude Bernard, physiologist
- Marcelin Berthelot, chemist, politician
- Yves Bonnefoy, poet, art historian
- Pierre Boulez, musician, writer
- Pierre Bourdieu, sociologist
- Jean-François Champollion, philologist, orientalist
- Jean-Pierre Changeux, neuroscientist
- Roger Chartier, historian, historiographer
- Anne Cheng, sinologist
- Claude Cohen-Tannoudji, physicist
- Alain Connes, mathematician
- Yves Coppens, anthropologist
- Georges Cuvier, naturalist, zoologist
- Marie Henri d'Arbois de Jubainville, historian, philologist
- Jean Darcet, chemist
- Jacques-Arsène d'Arsonval, physician, physicist, inventor
- Pierre-Gilles de Gennes, physicist
- Émile Deschanel, author, politician
- Georges Duby, historian
- Georges Dumézil
- Lucien Febvre
- Oronce Fine
- Michel Foucault
- Ferdinand André Fouqué
- Etienne Fourmont
- Marc Fumaroli
- Albert Gabriel
- Jean-Baptiste Gail
- Charles Gide
- Étienne Gilson
- Jerzy Grotowski
- Martial Gueroult
- Ian Hacking
- Eugène Auguste Ernest Havet
- Barthélemy d'Herbelot
- Françoise Héritier
- Frédéric Joliot
- Alfred Jost
- Stanislas Julien
- René Labat
- Edouard Rene Lefebvre de Laboulaye
- Sylvestre François Lacroix
- René Laennec
- Paul Langevin
- Henri Lebesgue
- René Leriche
- Emmanuel Le Roy Ladurie
- Claude Lévi-Strauss
- André Lichnerowicz
- Alfred Loisy
- Edmond Malinvaud
- Henri Maspero
- Louis Massignon
- Marcel Mauss
- Maurice Merleau-Ponty
- Jules Michelet
- Adam Mickiewicz
- Jean-Baptiste Morin
- Alexis Paulin Paris
- Abel Pavet de Courteille
- Paul Pelliot
- François Pétis de la Croix
- Guillaume Postel
- Edgar Quinet
- Petrus Ramus
- Henri Victor Regnault
- Louis Robert
- Jean-Baptiste Say
- Victor Scialac
- Jean-Pierre Serre
- François Simiand
- Gabriel Sionita
- André Vaillant
- Paul Valéry
- François Vatable
- Jean-Pierre Vernant
- Claire Voisin
- Jules Vuillemin
- Harald Weinrich
- Jean-Christophe Yoccoz
- Jean Yoyotte
- Don Zagier

== See also ==
- Institut de France
- Raymond Couvègnes
