= Inserm =

Biomedical French research institute

Institut national de la santé et de la recherche médicale

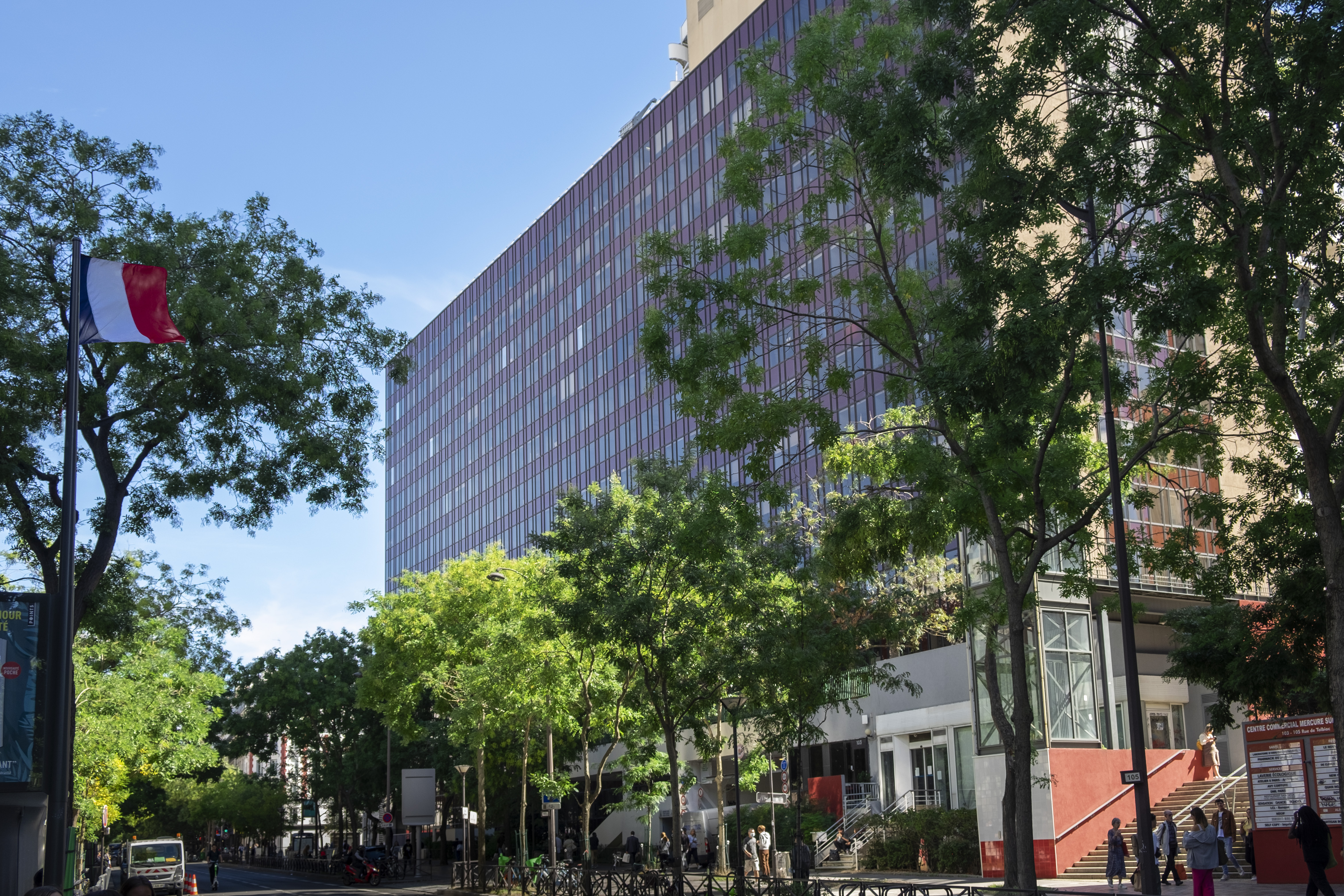
- Abbreviation: Inserm
- Formation: 1964
- Type: Governmental organization
- Location: Paris
- Region served: France
- Official language: French
- Director: Didier Samuel (2023)
- Staff: 6,500
- Website: inserm.fr/en

The Institut national de la santé et de la recherche médicale (Inserm, French pronunciation: [insɛʁm]) is the French National Institute of Health and Medical Research.

== History and organisation ==
Inserm was created in 1964 as a successor to the French National Institute of Health.

Inserm is the only public research institution solely focused on human health and medical research in France. It is a public institution with a scientific and technical vocation under the dual auspices of the Ministry of Health and the Ministry of Research. Similarly to the US National Institutes of Health, Inserm conducts fundamental and translational research projects through 339 research units, run by around 13,000 scientists, including 5,100 permanent research staff members and 5,100 staff members co-affiliated with university hospitals and medicine faculties. Inserm's laboratories and research units are located all over France, mainly in the largest cities. Eighty percent of Inserm research units are embedded in research hospitals of French universities.

In 1997, Inserm founded Orphanet, a rare disease database.

Inserm's CEO is chosen by decree upon a proposal of the Ministers of Health and Research, advised by a review committee. The CEO since February 2023 is Didier Samuel.

== Ranking ==
According to the 2019 Scimago Institutions Ranking, Inserm is the second-best research institution in the health sector (behind the NIH) and twenty-second best across all sectors.

== Awards ==
=== Nobel prizes ===
Two Inserm research scientists have been awarded by the Nobel Prize in Physiology or Medicine. In 1980, the French immunologist Jean Dausset received the Nobel prize (along with Baruj Benacerraf and George Davis Snell), for his work on the discovery and characterisation of the genes making the major histocompatibility complex. In 2008, the French virologist Françoise Barré-Sinoussi was awarded, together with her former mentor Luc Montagnier, for the identification of the human immunodeficiency virus.

=== Grand prix de l'Inserm ===
Each year, Inserm awards three researchers in three major distinct categories. The Grand prix de l'Inserm recognizes major advancements in biology for an active researcher of the institution, the Grand prix d'honneur recognizes a French public institution's researcher whose contributions have had a major impact in science, and the Prix étranger (Foreign Prize) awards a foreign researcher for their particular contributions to biomedical research. In addition the Inserm has internal awards for engineers and young researchers.

==== Awardees ====
Year	Grand prix	Prix d'honneur	Prix international
2023	Nadine Cerf-Bensussan		
2022	Olivier Delattre		
2021	Marion Leboyer		
2020	Dominique Costagliola		Anthony Fauci
2019	Eric Gilson	Jean-François Delfraissy	Michel Sadelain
2018	Alain Tedgui	Antoine Triller	Elisabetta Dejana
2017	Edith Heard	Claude-Agnès Reynaud and Jean-Claude Weill	Marie-Paule Kieny
2016	Jean-Laurent Casanova	Catherine Barthélémy	Linda Fried
2015	Pier-Vincenzo Piazza	Étienne-Émile Baulieu	Peter Piot
2014	Anne Dejean-Assémat	William Vainchenker	Leszek Borysiewicz
2013	Stanislas Dehaene	Daniel Louvard	Ogobara Doumbo
2012	Philippe Sansonetti	Jean-Paul Soulillou	Ingrid Grummt
2011	Alain Prochiantz	Ethel Moustacchi	Susan Gasser
2010	Didier Raoult	Eliane Gluckman	Denis Duboule
2009	Yehezkel Ben-Ari	Nicole Le Douarin	Nora Volkow
2008	Alain Fischer	Alim-Louis Benabid	Tomas Lindahl
2007	Christine Petit	Pierre Ducimetière	Mina Bissel
2006	Pierre Corvol	Ketty Schwartz	Zhu Chen
2005	Bernard Malissen at the CIML	Jacques Glowinski	David P. Lane
2004	Jean-Marc Egly	Pierre Chambon	Harvey Alter
2003	Miroslav Radman		
2002	Monique Capron		
2001	Yves Agid		
2000	Arnold Munnich		
