= Jacques Glowinski =

French pharmacist and professor (1936–2020)

Jacques Glowinski (30 August 1936 – 5 November 2020) was a French pharmacist and biology researcher specializing in neurobiology and neuropharmacology for which he is considered one of the founding fathers in France. Glowinski was a professor at the Collège de France and was also its administrator. He was a member of the French Academy of sciences.

== Biography ==
Glowinski was born in Paris. A student of Professor Denise Albe Fessard, Glowinski took his first steps in research in 1960 at the Marey Institute (Collège de France) and the Radioactive Isotopes Laboratory of the Pasteur Institute (Directors Gérard Milhaud and J.P Aubert). After synthesizing radioactive dopamine, he conducted the first studies on the cerebral metabolism of dopamine and norepinephrine, which were marked.

From 1963 to 1966, he was invited to continue his work at the National Institute of Health (Bethesda, United States) as part of Julius Axelrod's team (Nobel Prize in Medicine in 1972) in the prestigious Clinical Sciences Laboratory directed by S. Kety, pioneer with L. Sokolof in brain circulation studies. During this internship, Jacques Glowinski also collaborated with L. Iversen and S. Snyder and published, among his hundreds of publications, about twenty articles on the brain metabolism of catecholamines and demonstrated in particular the mechanism of action of tricyclic antidepressants.

On his return, Jacques Glowinski was appointed Inserm researcher. He created a small research group at the Collège de France in the Chair of Neurophysiology under Professor Alfred Fessard and quickly established a fruitful collaboration with the pharmaceutical industry. This group quickly became an Inserm Research Unit and has continued to develop, particularly after Jacques Glowinski's appointment as Chair of Neuropharmacology at the Collège de France (1981). This laboratory has trained a large number of researchers, many of whom have founded their own laboratories in France and abroad.

Glowinski died from complications of COVID-19 in Paris, on 5 November 2020, at the age of 84.

== Scientific contribution ==
Neurotransmission, neuropeptides (including tachykinins), metabolic and functional properties of monoaminergic and cholinergic regulatory systems, neural circuits of the basal ganglia, relationships between the prefrontal cortex and the basal ganglia, development of dopaminergic systems, properties of astrocytes and astrocyto-neuronal relationships, Parkinson's disease, schizophrenia, drug addiction, neurotoxicity, these were the main research areas of this laboratory, which has developed various research avenues.

His interest in science policy, his organizational skills and his taste for architecture and urban planning have also led him to participate in other projects. Thus, shortly after his appointment as Vice-President of the Assembly of Professors of the Collège de France (1991), Jacques Glowinski was appointed by his colleagues to be responsible for the Institution's renovation project as part of the President of the Republic's Major Works, a task that continued during his tenure as Director (2000-2006) and which ended in 2013. After having been a member of the Campus Plan Commission (2008), Jacques Glowinski was appointed by Mrs Valérie Pécresse, Minister of Higher Education and Research, to carry out a scientific and urban planning coordination mission for the Plateau de Saclay campus plan (2009-2010).

== Distinctions ==
Jacques Glowinski and his collaborators have been awarded several prizes: the Richard Lounsbery Prize for Biology and Medicine (1986), the Grand Prize of the Foundation for Medical Research (2002), the Inserm Honorary Prize (2005) and the European College of Neuropsychopharmacology Life time Award (2008). Jacques Glowinski has been a member of several national commissions and the Inserm Governing Council (CODIS, 1982-1991), President of the Society of Neurosciences (1995-1999), co-founder and President of the Scientific Council of the Brain Research Federation (BRC) and, more recently, in charge of preparing a national plan for the brain and nervous system diseases (2007).

- He became a full member of the French Academy of sciences in 1992.
- 2002: Grand Prize of the Foundation for Medical Research
- 2005: Inserm Honorary Prize
- ECNP Lifetime Achievement Award in Neuropsychopharmacology (2008)
- Appointed Doctor Honoris causa of HEC
- Appointed member of the editorial committee of the magazine Le Grand Paris 2011
- Appointed President of the Scientific Council of the Val de Seine School of Architecture ( 2011)
- In 2016, Jacques Glowinski published a book on his career path, written with François Cardinali, "Le Cerveau Architecte", the Collège de France in the 21st century. Fondation Hugot du Collège de France, Collège de France and Éditions Michel de Maule
- Commandeur of the Légion d'Honneur and Commandeur of the Ordre National du Mérite.
