= Ali Talib (artist) =

Iraqi painter

- علي طالب
- Born: 1944 (age 81–82); Basra, Iraq
- Education: Academy of Fine Arts in Baghdad ( BA, 1966); Helwan University, Cairo (MA, 1980)
- Known for: Painter, curator
- Website: Ali Talib Official website

Ali Talib (born 1944 in Basra) is an Iraqi painter, noted for his abstract works and for curating exhibitions featuring Iraqi artists.

== Life and career ==
Ali Talib was born in Basra in 1944. He was among the first graduates of the Academy of Fine Arts, Baghdad, gaining a BA in painting in 1966, He returned to Basra for a short period in the 1960s, but ultimately settled in Baghdad, which at the time had a thriving arts scene. Along with artists such as Amer al-Obaidi, Saleh al-Jumai'e, Salman Abbas, Talib Makki, Nida Kadhim and Faik Husein he became part of a group of artists and intellectuals that "defined Iraqi arts" in the 1960s.

He joined the faculty of the Institute of Fine Arts as a lecturer in painting, a position he held throughout the 1970s. He was known to exhibit a "rebellious attitude to what he and his colleagues regarded as a stagnant arts scene." Determined to be part of a change, he became very active in the local arts community through his participation in Iraq's numerous art groups. He was founding member of the Innovationists established in 1965; a group of younger artists that wanted to advance Iraqi art by through the use of new media and new methods. Artists in this group often took war and conflict as their themes. Following the demise of the Innovationists group in 1969, Talib established a new art group, known as the Shadow Group. He was also a member of the New Vision Group, joining it a few years after its formation in 1968.

He studied graphic design at Helwan University in Cairo, where he attained a Master of Arts in 1980. In 1991 he left Iraq for Amman, Jordan where he was employed as a professor of fine arts at Yarmouk University between 1991-1997. He currently divides his time between the Netherlands and Amman, Jordan. In the Netherlands, he has curated exhibitions such as Iraq: Still Going Strong which featured works by Iraqi artists who did not flee the country during the 1990s.

He is the subject of a number of scholarly publications, including:

- Dia Azzawi, Ingrid Rollema, Jabra Ibrahim Jabra, Shakir Hassan Al Said, Abdulrahman Munif and May Muzaffar, Ali Talib, (English & Arabic) Dar Amwaj, 2009 ISBN 995341775X (book)

and;

- Yusuf Faruq, "Three Painters, Three Styles," Gilgamesh: A Journal of Modern Iraqi Art, vol. 3, 1988 pp 13–17 (journal article)
- Mayy Muzzafar, "A Turmoil Under a Quiet Surface," Gilgamesh: A Journal of Modern Iraqi Art, vol. 3, 1988 pp 6–12 (journal article)

== Work ==
Talib held his first solo exhibition at Mubarakia Gallery, Kuwait, in 1964, while he was still a student at the Academy. Since then, he has participated in scores of solo exhibitions and group exhibitions, including Gallery d'Art 50x70, Beirut, 1994; De Vrije Academie, The Hague, 2003 and United Nation Humans Settlements Programme, Barcelona, 2004. His work is held in collections including Mathaf Arab Museum of Modern Art, Doha and Jordan National Gallery of Fine Arts, Amman.

His artwork deals with themes of the human experience and the power of nature. The art historian and art critic, Jabra Ibrahim Jabra commented on Talib's work: "His paintings skillfully tackle an experience insistent with its inner contradictions: evasive and recurrent, leaving its impact each time in certain forms on the canvas-and in our memory."

Select list of paintings

- Mesopotamia Mixed media on paper 76 x 56 cm (297/8 x 22 in) (now in a private collection), 2004
- The Mask oil on canvas, 110 x 110 cm (43 5/16 x 43 5/16in), 1976
- Lovers and Mountain 139 x 139 cm (54¾ x 54¾ in), 1985
- Tangera (Series), 2009

== Awards and prizes ==
During the 1986 inaugural Baghdad International Arts Festival, he and Shakir Hassan Al Said and Dia Azzawi, were the three Iraqi artists who were awarded prizes. He has been the recipient of two prizes:

- 1986 First Prize, First Baghdad International Festival of Plastic Arts, Baghdad, Iraq
- 1995 First Prize, Second Sharjah Biennale, Sharjah, UAE

== See also ==
- Iraqi art
- List of Iraqi artists
