= Fazlul Bari =

Fazlul Bari may refer to:

- Fazlul Bari (Indian politician) (1936–2011), Indian politician and activist
- Fazlul Bari (Pakistani politician) (1922–1971), Pakistani politician
- Chowdhury Fazlul Bari, Bangladesh Army officer
- Mohammad Fazlul Bari, Bangladeshi civil servant and diplomat
