= Takiyya of Ali al-Bandaniji =

Old Sufi Monastery in Baghdad, Iraq

Religion
- Affiliation: Islam
- Rite: Qadiriyya wa Naqshbandiyya
- Status: Semi-active

Location
- Location: Baghdad, Iraq

Architecture
- Type: Sufi monastery
- Founder: Sheikh Ali al-Qadiri al-Bandaniji
- Established: 1743

The Takiyya of Ali al-Bandaniji (Arabic: تكية علي البندنيجي) is a takiyya located in Bab al-Sheikh area of eastern Baghdad, Iraq, near the Mausoleum of Abd al-Qadir al-Gilani. It is considered one of the most important modern Sufi monasteries due to its scholarly and spiritual role in Baghdadi society. It was founded by a sheikh named Sayyid Ali al-Qadiri al-Bandaniji, a popular Sufi scholar who had many disciples and students in Baghdad who used to attend his teachings in this takiyya. The takiyya also acted as an important madrasa and majlis for the people of Baghdad during the Ottoman Empire period, in which many of the religious scholars of Baghdad graduated.

== History ==
The takiyya was founded in the Bab al-Sheikh area, adjacent to al-Ghazali Cemetery and close to the Mausoleum of Abd al-Qadir al-Gilani, around 1743 by Sayyid Ali bin Ibrahim al-Qadiri al-Bandaniji during the Ottoman era. He was born in the town of Mandali in 1711, which at the time used to be called "Bandanij", hence Ali's name. He later traveled to Baghdad, where he founded a Qadiri takiyya that was named after him. Al-Bandaniji would gather a lot of students, do charity work, and recite dhikr and works of Imam Muhammad al-Bukhari. Al-Bandaniji also left many works of poetry and scholarship, which he worked on in the takiyya. According to Iraqi scholar Mahmud Shukri al-Alusi, the takiyya had 10,000 followers. He passed away after being infected with a plague that hit Baghdad in 1772 and was buried in the takiyya, where his tomb is still accessible in the present.

The custodianship of the takiyya was taken over by his successor, Sheikh Safa' al-Din Isa bin al-Bandaniji al-Qadir al-Hasan, in 1788. His father, Sheikh Musa Jalal al-Din, was a Qadiri-Naqshabandi Sufi who was killed in 1822 after the Qajar invasion of Mandali. Due to his background, Isa focused on scholarly and work teachings of the Qadiri-Naqshabandi Orders in both the takiyya in the evening and the Dawudiyya Madrasa of the Haydar-Khana Mosque in the morning. Notably, Isa also built a small mosque in the takiyya and established a majlis attended by scholars, notables, and dignitaries of Baghdad. This raised the importance of the takiyya at the time. Many of the religious scholars and sheikhs at the time in Iraq were from the families of al-Alusi, al-Rawi, al-Kurdi, and al-Na'ib.

Isa, who succeeded the custodianship of al-Bandaniji, would marry his daughter Saliha and have five children named Abdullah, Abd al-Rahman, Abd al-Rahim Diya' al-Din, Ahmad, and Hussein. He passed away on 25 November 1866 and was buried in a small chamber adjacent to the tomb of Ali al-Bandaniji. Currently, its entrance overlooks the takiyya's iwan. Afterwards, the custodianship was passed to his son, Sheikh Abd al-Rahman. The noble al-Bandaniji family remains the main custodians of the takiyya as of the 2010s.

== Layout and details ==
The takiyya is small and rectangular in shape (37x34m) with thick walls. It has only one floor, one main entrance, and a courtyard in the middle containing a small Islamic garden with a fountain at the center. Around the courtyard are several seclusion rooms, a kitchen that serves food to its followers, and the tomb of its founder and namesake on the eastern side. As well as the tombs of five other people. The prayer hall is topped by a dome above it. Sufi teachers continued to teach in the takiyya, and Qadiri dhikr circles were still being practiced in the complex every Tuesday and Friday nights. During the summer, they were held in the courtyard, while in the winter, they were held in the prayer room. Renovations of the takiyya were materialized in 1906 and then later in 1967.

=== Awqaf ===
The takiyya had several awqaf. The first was established by the daughter of Ali al-Bandaniji around 1838 in the presence of the Qadi of Baghdad, Ibrahim Sa'ad al-Din Effendi, who also registered in that same year. The waqf took care of students, fakirs, and children of both genders. As well as providing them with food and drinks. Records show that two more awqaf were also established in 1811 and 1813 by volunteers.
