= Abd al-Sattar al-Aboussi =

Iraqi military officer (1930 – 1970)

- Native name: عبد الستار العبوسي
- Born: 1930
- Died: 26 November 1970 (aged 39–40)
- Cause of death: Suicide
- Rank: First Commander
- Known for: Al-Rehab Palace massacre

Abd al-Sattar al-Aboussi (Arabic: عبد الستار العبوسي, 1930 – 26 November 1970) was an Iraqi military officer. He's recognized as the main perpetrator of the al-Rehab Palace Massacre and the killer of the Iraqi Hashemite royal family during the 14 July 1958 revolution.

== Early life ==
Abd al-Sattar Saba'a al-Aboussi was born in 1930 in the Bab al-Sheikh neighborhood near the Shrine of Abd al-Qadir al-Gillani in Baghdad, Iraq. Al-Aboussi had two brothers, the first, Jawad, worked as a military officer and was killed on national duty, while the second, Rashid, was a student studying biology in the United States. A rumor has it that he was killed in an incident that some attributed to the Regent Abd al-Ilah because of his national activity against the royal regime, while others believe that his killing was by the CIA, as he was excelling in his studies and the Americans offered him to leave Iraq and stay in the United States. Because he refused these offers, he was physically liquidated. Nevertheless, this incident gave al-Aboussi a grudge against the Iraqi royal family.

== Al-Rehab Palace Massacre ==
On 14 July 1958, a military coup to overthrow the Iraqi monarchy took place. Eventually, the revolutionaries ordered military soldiers to guard the royal al-Rehab Palace that morning. King Faisal II exited the palace with a Qu'ran and a white flag, wanting to be surrendered in peace. However, al-Aboussi, an infantry trainer in the al-Washash camp who wasn't part of the movement, ran with enthusiasm to the palace. He urged the soldiers to fire at the palace and urged aggression. At the garden of the palace, al-Aboussi, alongside an Iraqi soldier named Mustafa Abdullah, opened fire on the royal family without warning. Killing Faisal II at age 23, alongside Abd al-Ilah and many of the princesses. Abd al-Ilah's corpse would then be dragged across al-Rashid Street where crowds stoned it.

== Aftermath and death ==
Two years after the massacre, al-Aboussi regretted the killing of the royal family. In a recorded meeting with an Iraqi officer named Adnan Muhammad Nuri, al-Aboussi stated that the event made him lack sleep and have dreams where Faisal II, in white clothes, confronted him and asking repeatedly him "Why did you kill me? Did I hurt you? Did I do something wrong? Why did you take away my life when I was very young?" Soon after, other members of the royal family, including Princess Nafissa, started to appear in his dreams. In a later meeting with Nuri, al-Aboussi's dreams became worse after women he did not recognize blaming him for Iraq's conditions. At one point, al-Aboussi traveled to the Soviet Union for treatment but it did not help him.

Al-Aboussi would eventually commit suicide in 1970 by shooting himself with a 5mm pistol bullet, dying twelve years after the massacre.
