= Yarmouk University =

Public university in Irbid, Jordan

Yarmouk University جامعة اليرموك
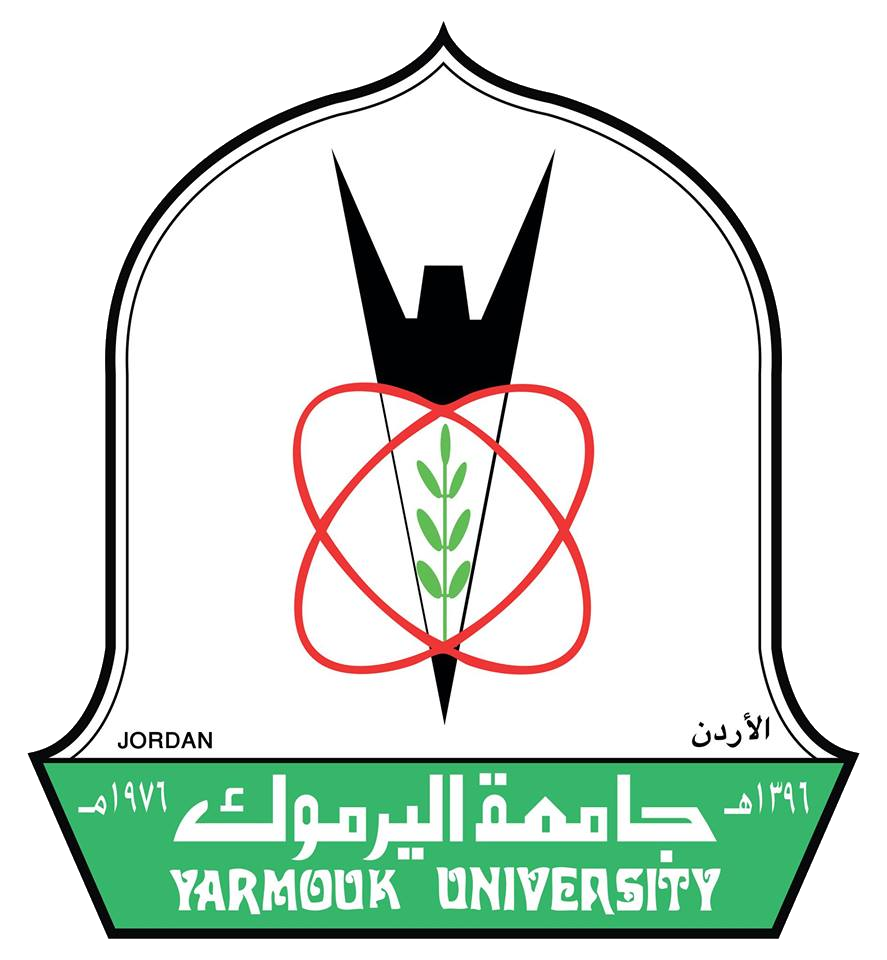
- Type: Public
- Established: 1976
- Affiliations: IAU, FUIW, UNIMED, AArU
- Endowment: 123,000,000 JOD
- President: Malek Alsharairi
- Vice-president: Prof. Amjad D. Al-Nasser; Prof. Ruba F. Bataineh
- Academic staff: 1,080
- Administrative staff: 1,597
- Students: 41000
- Undergraduates: 31,282
- Postgraduates: 2,807
- Doctoral students: 562
- Location: Irbid, Irbid Governorate, Jordan; 32°32′15″N 35°51′20″E
- Campus: Urban 1 square kilometre (250 acres)
- Colors: Green and White ^{[a]}
- Nickname: Al-Yarmouk
- Website: www.yu.edu.jo/index.php/en
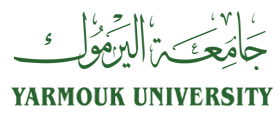

Yarmouk University (Arabic: جامعة اليرموك), also abbreviated YU, is a comprehensive public and state-supported university located near the city centre of Irbid in northern Jordan. Since its establishment in 1976, it has been at the forefront of Jordanian and Middle Eastern universities. The University consists of 15 faculties offering 52 bachelor's degrees, 64 master's degrees, and 18 PhD Programs in different disciplines. The university also hosts 12 research and career centers.

As of the Academic Year 2016/2017, the university had 1,004 faculty members and 1,597 staff with 34,651 students in all academic programs (31,282 Undergraduate, 2,807 Postgraduate, and 562 Doctoral). In addition, there were around 5,000 international students from 50 different nations.

== History ==
YU was established in 1976, and contains 15 faculties. Each year YU grants over 4000 Bachelor's and Master Degrees. The university started with a small number of faculty members; now it hosts 1,004 faculty members, of which 260 are full professors, 239 associate professors, 278 assistant professors, and 227 lecturers.

== Presidents ==
- Prof. Malek A. Alsharairi

== Campus ==
YU campus is located near the city center of Irbid, the second largest city in Jordan. The campus consists of independent buildings for each faculty and administration unit.

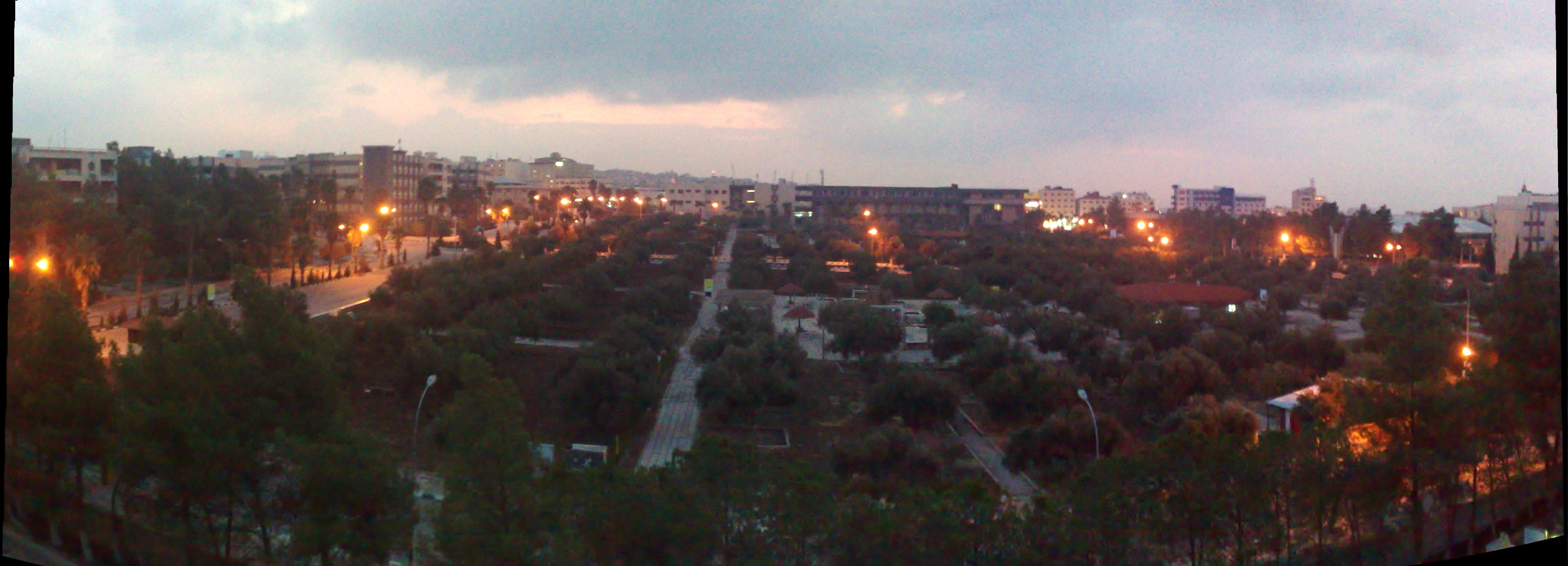
YU Campus

== Academics ==
There are fifteen faculties in the Yarmouk University that offer doctoral, graduate and undergraduate degrees, the medium of lectures, exams, and tuition depends in the faculty, scientific faculties use mainly English while other faculties use mainly Arabic, while Arabic is the main communication language in the university.

Faculty of Arts	Faculty of Science	Faculty of Economics and Administrative Sciences	Hijjawi Faculty for Engineering Technology	Faculty of Shariaa	Faculty of Education	Faculty of Physical Education	Faculty of Fine Arts	Faculty of Mass Communication	Faculty of Information Technology and Computer Sciences	Faculty of Archaeology and Anthropology	Faculty of Tourism and Hotel Management	Faculty of Law	Faculty of Medicine	Faculty of Pharmacy
1976	1976	1981	1984	1990	1988	1993	2001	2008	2002	2003	2010	1992	2013	2012

=== Scientific colleges ===
Faculty of Science:

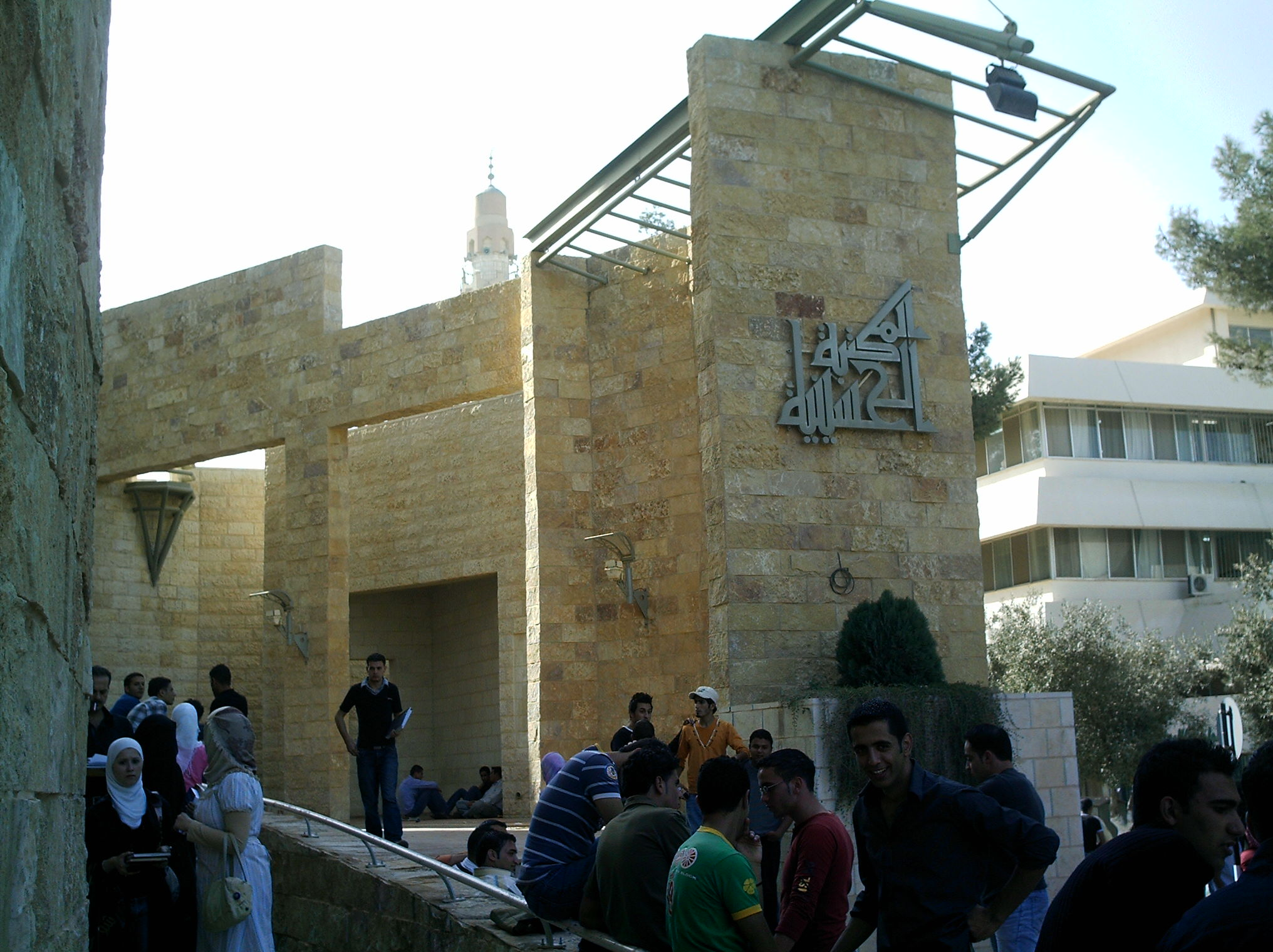
- The University Library
  Mathematics
- Physics
- Chemistry
- Biological Sciences
- Statistics
- Earth and Environment

Hijjawi Faculty of Engineering Technology:

- Biomedical Systems and Informatics Engineering
- Civil Engineering
- Computer Engineering
- Electronic Engineering
- Power Engineering
- Telecommunications Engineering
- Architectural Engineering
- Industrial Engineering

Faculty of IT and Computer science:

- Computer Sciences
- Computer Information Systems
- Management Information Systems
- Software Engineering
- Network Security and Systems

Faculty of Medicine

Faculty of Pharmacy and Pharmaceutical sciences

=== Colleges of arts and humanity sciences ===
- Faculty of Arts:
  - Arabic Language and Literature
  - English Language and Literature
  - Modern Languages
  - Semitic and Eastern Languages
  - Translation
  - History
  - Sociology and Social Work
  - Political Sciences
  - Geography
- Faculty of Education:
  - Curriculum and Instruction
  - Administration and Foundations
  - Counseling and Ed. Psychology
  - Elementary Education
- Faculty of Fine arts:
  - Fine Arts
  - Drama
  - Design
  - Music
- Faculty of Economics and Administrative Sciences:
  - Economics
  - Accounting
  - Marketing
  - Finance and Banking
  - Public Administration
  - Business Administration
- Faculty of Shari'a and Islamic Studies:
  - Fiqh
  - Usul Addin
  - Islamic studies
  - Islamic Economics&Banking
- Faculty of Law:
  - Private law
  - Public law
- Faculty of Physical Education:
  - Physical Education
  - Sport Science
- Faculty of Archaeology and Anthropology:
  - Archaeology
  - Anthropology
  - Epigraphy
- 'Faculty of Tourism and Hotel Management:'
  - Tourism
  - Conservation and Management of Cultural Resources
- Faculty of Mass Communication:
  - Public Relations and Advertising
  - Journalism
  - Radio & Television

== Deanships & Centers ==
- Deanship of Student Affairs
- Deanship of Research and Graduate Studies
- The Language Center
- Computer & Information Center
- Faculty Development Center (FDC)
- Queen Rania Center
- Refugees & Displaced Persons & Migration Center
- Center of Theoretical and Applied Physics Center
- Speech and Hearing Center
- The Jordanian Design Center (JDC)
- Academic Entrepreneurship Center of Excellence
- UNESCO Chair for Desert Studies and Desertification Control
- Marine Science Station Center (MSS)

== Yarmouk University Press ==
The university publishes journals that are internationally peer-reviewed journals, they are published in cooperation with the Jordanian Ministry of Higher Education and Scientific Research, and other annual and semiannual periodicals:

- Jordan Journal of Chemistry (ISSN 1814-9111)(LCCN 2006308967)
- Jordan Journal physics (ISSN 1994-7615)
- Jordan Journal of Mathematics and Statistics (ISSN 2075-7905)
- Jordan Journal of Modern Languages and Literature (ISSN 1994-6953)
- Jordan Journal of Arts
- Jordan Journal of Educational Sciences (ISSN 2303-9574)

Periodicals published by the university that include dissertations and masters thesis works:

1. Abhath Al-Yarmouk (AYBSE). (ISSN 1023-0149)
2. Abhath Al-Yarmouk (AYHSS). (ISSN 1023-0165)

== Media ==
Yarmouk University has an FM radio station that broadcasts 24/7 at the frequency 105.7 FM. The station Yarmouk FM broadcasts news, music, political, social, and academic programs, and weather forecast. Yarmouk University has a newspaper that published periodically. The newspaper Sahafat Al-Yarmouk publish in the following topics:

- news
- music
- political
- social
- academic programs

== Notable alumni ==
- Shireen Abu Akleh, journalist
- Reham Al-Farra, diplomat and journalist murdered in suicide bombing
- Emad Hajjaj, cartoonist.
- Osama Hamdan, Palestinian senior representative of Hamas
- Ahmad Hanandeh, Jordanian Minister of Digital Economy and Entrepreneurship
- Hanadi Jaradat, Palestinian suicide bomber
- Yousef Shamali, Jordanian Minister of Industry, Trade and Supply
- Nasser Shraideh, Jordanian Deputy Prime Minister for Economic Affairs and Minister of State for Public Sector Modernisation
- Yasser Abu Hilalah, Aljazeera News Channel's director general

== Faculty ==
Notable past Yarmouk University faculty include:

- Prof. Adnan Badran (1976-1986).
- Prof. Ali Mahafza (1989-1993).
- Prof. Marwan Kamal (1994-1997).
- Dr. Seteney Shami, Anthropologist.
- Ina'am Qaddoura Al-Mufti.
- Sayed Awad (1982-1986), Egyptian composer of contemporary classical music.
- Dr. Abdul Jabbar Hassoon Jerri, Iraqi American mathematician.
- Dr. Khaldoun H. Shami, Syrian scholar of ethnographic documentary.
- Dr. Mohammad Basil Altaie, Iraqi physicist, philosopher and professor of theoretical physics.
- Dr. Muhammad Mufaku, Albanian Syrian professor of Middle East studies.
- Dr. Salam Fayyad, Economist.
- Ali Talib, Iraqi artist.

== See also ==
- List of Islamic educational institutions
