= Bab al-Sheikh =

Neighborhood in Baghdad, Iraq

Bab al-Sheikh بَاب ٱلشَّيْخ
- Neighborhood
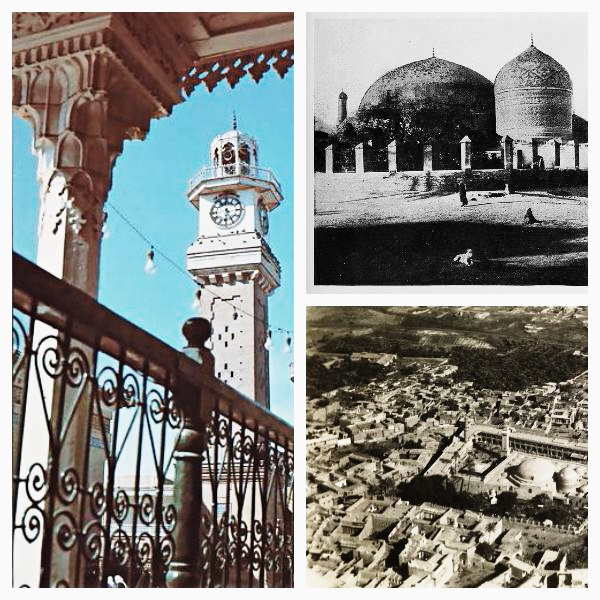
- Various angles of the Qadiriyya Shrine and Bab al-Sheikh
- Located in: Baghdad, Iraq
- Known for: Hadhrat al-Qadiriyya
- Founder: Al-Mustazhir
- Named for: Abd al-Qadir al-Gilani
- Time zone: UTC+3 (Arabian Standard Time)

Bab al-Sheikh (Arabic: بَاب ٱلشَّيْخ, romanized: The Gate of the Sheikh) is an old historical large neighborhood in the Rusafa side of Baghdad, Iraq. It is notable for being the location of the Hadhrat al-Qadiriyya which contains the tomb of Sufi Sheikh Abd al-Qadir al-Gilani, founder of the Qadiriyya Order. The area is contains many Sufi monasteries, tombs, smaller neighborhoods, and mosques.

Bab al-Sheikh is located southeast of the Rusafa side of Baghdad, and has historically been a significant site for religious, community, and cultural activity. Due to this, the area gained a reputation for having a collective cultural memory, as well as being the center of the Sufi Qadiriyya Order that spread in the Islamic world as far back as the Abbasid Caliphate.

== History ==
=== Background ===
The Arabic name Bab al-Sheikh translates to “The Gate of the Sheikh” and is a reference to the Sufi Sheikh Abd al-Qadir al-Gilani who is buried in a tomb in the same mosque in the area that also bears his name. The area was originally named Bab al-Azj prior to al-Gilani's arrival.

Abd al-Qadir al-Gilani was a respected Sufi Theologian and mystic who founded the Sufi Qadiriyya Order and a madrasa dedicated to it that bears its name where al-Gilani and his family lived in until his death in 1166 where he was buried in it. His order flourished and survived the 1258 Mongol destruction of Baghdad. However, when Iranian Safavid Shah Isma'il I conquered Baghdad, he destroyed the shrine. In 1534 Baghdad was conquered by the Ottoman Empire. Its Sultan, Suleiman the Magnificent, ordered a dome be built over al-Gilani's mausoleum.

The area was said to be established by Abbasid Caliph al-Mustazhir (1094-1118 CE) upon building one of the gates of Baghdad. Later during the reign of Abbasid Caliph al-Nasir in 1222, he built Bab al-Talsim in the area and renovated the area. This gate would be used by Ottoman Sultan Murad IV upon entering Baghdad in 1638. Bab al-Talsim would eventually be destroyed by Ottoman forces in 1917 just before the British Empire took over Iraq.

=== Ottoman period ===
During the Ottoman Empire period, Bab al-Sheikh became a prominent safe spot for people fleeing the government. Due to this, the area was a refuge and did not allow them to be arrested by Ottoman Authorities. As such, it attracted the same reputation as Karbala for being a safe haven for those fleeing the Ottoman government. Bab al-Sheikh also became the source of many uprisings and demonstrations against the government. Around 1831, when Ali Riza Pasha conquered Baghdad, representing the Ottoman Sultan's will, and took it back from the Mamluk Dynasty, some of Dawud Pasha's supporters went to hiding in Bab al-Sheikh, including Islamic scholar Mahmud al-Alusi, who was then interceded by the area's Mufti to work at the Hadhrat al-Qadiriyya's madrasa.

Around the summer of 1848, uprisings in Bab al-Sheikh reached Bab al-Mu’adham. The uprisings were motivated by frustrations against the Wali's imposition of a taxation policy on the craftsmen. After repressing them, the Wali accused the shrine's preacher, Sayyid Muhammad Amin al-Wa’iz, of being among the instigators of the uprisings. Consequently, he banished him and several of his followers to Basra. Al-Alusi, the Mufti of the shrine at this point, was also banished to Basra where al-Alusi spent the rest of his life in hardship. During the reign of Midhat Pasha, mandatory officer conscriptions were established by the Pasha. As a result, Bab al-Sheikh blew up with demonstrations against the conscription system. Several regressive protestors took arms and attacked the souks that belonged to Christians and Jews who were living in that area. Midhat Pasha heard their gunshots from his office and immediately ordered officers to protect the Christians and Jews. Midhat Pasha then focused on arresting the demonstrators of Bab al-Sheikh who eventually got drafted into the Ottoman military.

Bab al-Sheikh was also home to several special gatherings for many families based in Baghdad. Among those were the Turkish al-Jorbaji family, which was known for being a philanthropist family, Bayt al-Alaqband, a family that was well known for teaching high positions in schools and the Qadiriyya madrasa, and other gatherings for families of religious scholars.

=== Present day ===
Bab al-Sheikh from a bird's-eye view in 1925.

In 1982, plans to develop Bab al-Sheikh as part of a wider development project were proposed. Because the street next to the old shrine connected to al-Khulafa Street, John Moutoussamy had plans to preserve many historic houses in the area. Previously, parts of the area were demolished to make parking lots. Due to this, the Baghdad Municipality was obligated to follow the advice of Iraqi architect Rifat Chadirji who didn't approve of old areas in Bab al-Sheikh being blindly given away for the sake of development. The development of Bab al-Sheikh was planned to have public transportation and extend the Central Business District. However, due to the Iran-Iraq War and the Gulf War, these projects were never completed.

During the 2003 US-led invasion of Iraq, Bab al-Sheikh, similar to a lot of areas in Baghdad, saw a major decline in the medical, social, and job sectors. The area was looted and vandalized by foreigners. Many of Bab al-Sheikh's people migrated which left the area in dire poverty.

== Hadhrat al-Qadiriyya ==
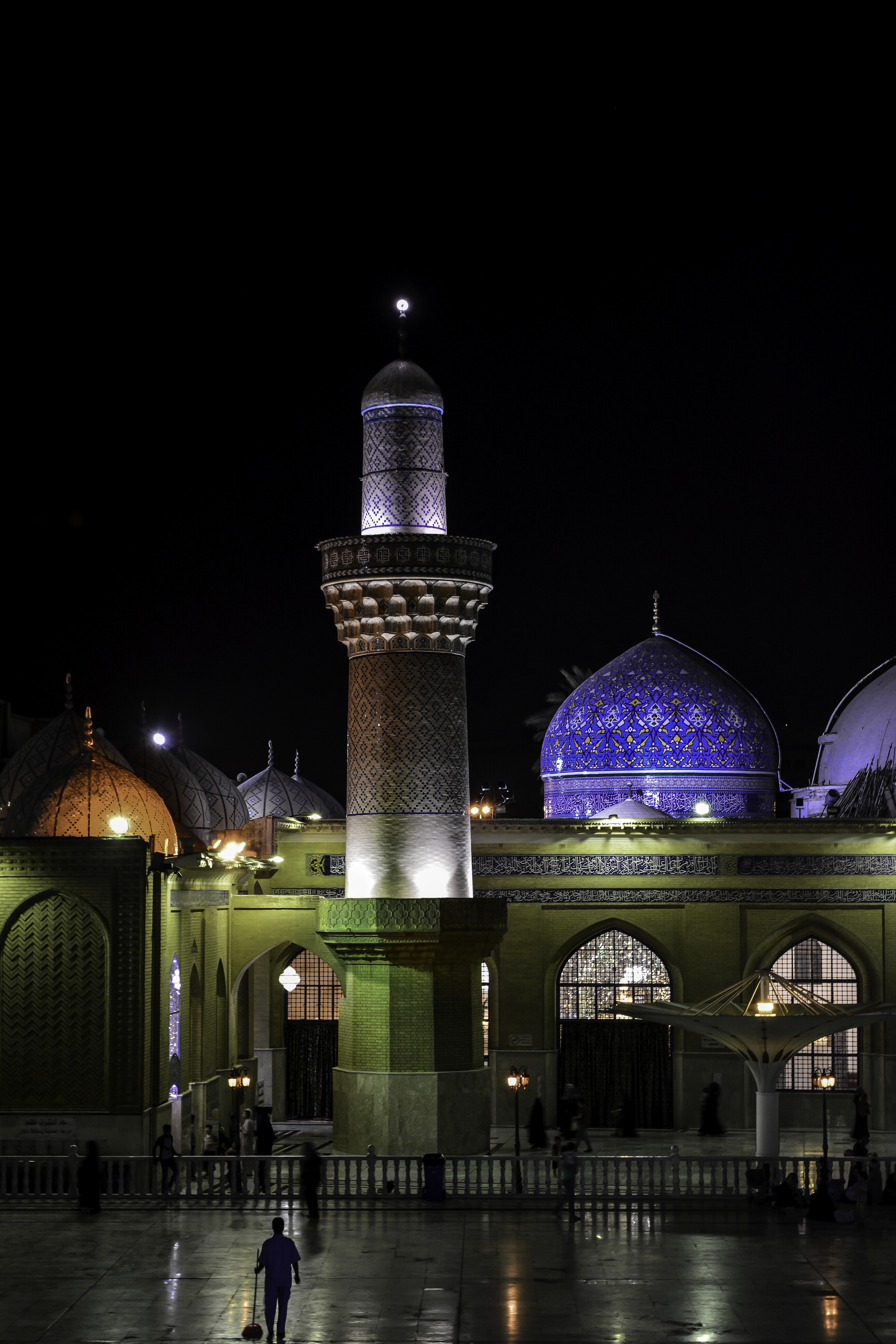
The exterior of the mausoleum inside the Hadhrat al-Qadiriyya.

Abd al-Qadir al-Gilani was a Sufi mystic, theologian, and teacher who was born in Gilan in 1077 and later came to Baghdad at the age of 18 to study. He surpassed a lot of his teachers due to his adherence to virtue, asceticism, and principle. In the area of Bab al-Azj, now Bab al-Sheikh, he was hired as a preacher in one of the madrasas there. A madrasa and a takiyya were then built for him by Abu Saeed Mubarak. After Mabarak's death, al-Gilani took over its administration and further expanded it with the help of donations. Al-Gilani passed away in 1156 and was buried in a portico in the complex where a conical dome originally towered over it.

Shortly after, the Hadhrat al-Qadiriyya also housed a mosque in it connected with the madrasa and tomb. Currently, the complex is one of the most important locations in Baghdad due to its religious, historical, and cultural significance. Over the years, many reconstructions, including ones ordered by Ottoman Sultans and pashas, were added to the complex. Such as large domes, a courtyard, and arcades for the madrasa. All which still stand in the present complex. Two of the main domes stand over the main tomb and the prayer hall. The complex also contains several minarets built over the decades, as well as many Islamic decorations and mosaics. The mosque in the complex was built to commemorate al-Gilani since it was next to his tomb. This was a common feature of many mosques in Baghdad in which they were built next to shrines to commemorate the entombed person. Other examples of this tradition in Baghdad are the Abu Hanifa Mosque, al-Kadhimiyya Mosque, Sayyid Sultan Ali Mosque, and the Mausoleum of Umar Suhrawardi.

When visiting the Hadhrat, it was common to recite Surat al-Fatiha among entering the door as a custom. Sufi ceremonies that contained dhikr and candles were done by sheikhs to cure sick women who visited the mosque. Among the visitors were people who came from as far as India due to the popularity of al-Gilani's teachings in India. For various reasons, many visitors donated thousands to the Hadhrat al-Qadiriyya and performed ziyarat to his tomb. Traditionally, the Hadhrat al-Qadiriyya held iftar and tarawih sessions during Ramadan with the mosque's kitchen cooking food for the people of the area. During the COVID-19 pandemic, the mosque was forced to close down until it was reopened for Ramadan in 2021 to let in visitors to break fast and perform tarawih.

== Notable landmarks ==
Bab al-Sheikh has historically been home to many neighborhoods and quarters that housed coffeehouses, mosques, Sufi monasteries, and houses of noble families. Among the Sufi monasteries are the Abu Khumra Takiyya, Ali al-Bandaniji Takiyya, al-Nabka Takiyya, al-Naqib Takiyya, and the Kurdish Fayli Takiyya adjecent to the Siraj al-Din neighborhood. Bab al-Sheikh is also adjacent to the Sheikh Umar street.

=== Ali al-Bandaniji Takiyya ===
The Takiyya of Ali al-Bandaniji is one of the Sufi monasteries located in the area founded by a sheikh named Sayyid Ali al-Qadiri al-Bandaniji, who came from the town of Mandali, and has been managed by his family since its founding. The monastery follows the Qadiriyya wa Naqshbandiyya, and since its foundation in 1743 was an important scholarly, spiritual, and gathering place for Baghdadi people. It contained a Sufi madrasa and a social majlis where people met in during the Ottoman period. Many of the religious scholars and sheikhs who studied at the madrasa and graduated from it during the Ottoman era were from the families of al-Alusi, al-Rawi, al-Kurdi, and al-Na'ib.

Ali al-Bandaniji's tomb is located in a room inside the complex alongside other members of his family.

=== Al-Ghazali cemetery ===
The al-Ghazali cemetery is a cemetery located up the Qadiriyya complex. To the east of this cemetery are several shrines connected to the mausoleum of al-Gilani, connected to the wall of Baghdad, belonging to the families of al-Khudairi, al-Darakzanli, al-Sheikhli, al-Jurbaji, al-Bajaji, and al-Orfali. The cemetery also contains a mausoleum dedicated to al-Ghazali, the Islamic philosopher and scholar. The Ghazali buried in this cemetery was mentioned in the endowment of Silahdar Hussein Pasha in the year 1772. There's a dispute concerning the identity of the entombed with some believing that it's the authentic tomb of al-Ghazali and not the well-known tomb in Tus. The caretaker of the mausoleum, Sheikh Fadhil al-Barzanji, shares this belief. History professor at the University of Baghdad, Hamid Majid Hadou, said in an article of al-Jazeera that the belief is a common misconception among Iraqis. According to him, the tomb is of a Sufi also named al-Ghazali and doubts that it's the real one.

=== Al-Rawas Mosque ===
Al-Rawas Mosque (Arabic: جامع الرَّوَّاس), located near al-Gilani Street, was founded and built by Sultan Abdul Hamid II in 1893. It had a madrasa and the tomb of Husaynid Sheikh Muhammad al-Rawas, after whom the mosque is named after, who died in 1875. Al-Rawas lived and worked in Bab al-Sheikh. The mosque was then demolished by the Baghdad Municipality in 1954 to pave al-Jumhuriya Street and the remains of Sheikh Muhammad al-Rawas were transferred to the cemetery of the Sayyid Sultan Ali Mosque. It is now recognized as one of the lost mosques of Baghdad.

== People from Bab al-Sheikh ==
- Abd al-Rahman al-Gilani
- Abd al-Sattar al-Aboussi
- Hafidh al-Droubi
- Khairi al-Hindawi
- Nazik al-Malaika
- Rashid Ali al-Gilani

== See also ==
- Gates of Baghdad
- Bab al-Sharqi
