= Sanad (government app) =

- Developer: Ministry of Digital Economy and Entrepreneurship (Jordan)
- Release: February 2020
- Operating system: iOS, Android, HarmonyOS
- Available in: Arabic, English
- Type: E-government, Digital identity
- Website: sanad.gov.jo

Sanad (Arabic: سند) is the official digital identity and e-government services application of the Hashemite Kingdom of Jordan. Developed and managed by the Ministry of Digital Economy and Entrepreneurship, the app provides a unified platform for accessing a range of public services and personal records digitally.

== Overview ==
Launched in February 2020, Sanad is part of Jordan's broader digital transformation strategy aimed at improving public service delivery and enhancing administrative efficiency. The app allows users to authenticate their identity digitally and access over 550 services from more than 50 government and private sector entities.

== Features ==
Sanad provides a wide array of services, including:

- Viewing and managing official digital documents
- Applying for government services (e.g., jordanian passport issuance or renewal, health insurance)
- Accessing personal records (e.g., pension, property ownership)
- Digitally signing documents
- Paying utility bills and traffic fines
- Receiving and tracking official notifications

The app is available on iOS, Android, and HarmonyOS platforms and supports both Arabic and English languages.

== Digital Identity ==
A core feature of Sanad is the digital identity system, which enables secure login and authentication for all integrated services. Users must activate their digital identity at designated Sanad stations across Jordan to access the full suite of services.

== Adoption and Impact ==
As of 2025, more than 1.6 million Jordanians have activated their digital identities through Sanad. The app has played a significant role in streamlining government interactions and reducing the need for in-person visits, especially during the COVID-19 pandemic.

== Recent Developments ==
In 2025, the Ministry launched an updated version of the app with enhanced user experience and new services, including the e-passport issuance feature.

== See also ==
- E-Government
- Ministry of Digital Economy and Entrepreneurship (Jordan)
