= Ahmad Hanandeh =

Jordanian politician (born 1973)

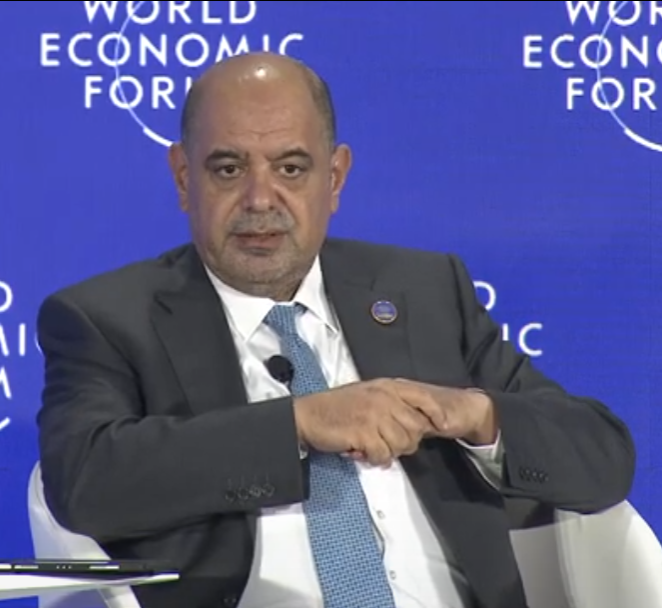
- At a WEF meeting in June 2024

Minister of Digital Economy and Entrepreneurship
- In office 7 October 2020 – 18 September 2024
- Monarch: Abdullah II of Jordan
- Prime Minister: Bisher Al-Khasawneh
- Preceded by: Mothanna Gharaibeh
- Succeeded by: Sami Smeirat

Personal details
- Born: Ahmad Qasim Theeb Al-Hanandeh; 1973 (age 52–53)
- Education: Yarmouk University (BS)

Ahmad Qasim Theeb Al-Hanandeh (born 1973) is a Jordanian politician. Previously, he had served as Minister of Digital Economy and Entrepreneurship from 7 October 2020 until 18 September 2024.

== Education ==
Hanandeh holds a Bachelor of Banking and Finance (1994) from the Yarmouk University.

== Career ==
From 1994 to 2006, he was an accountant of the Aramex Group and later became the country manager of Asian operations.

Until 2011, Hanandeh worked as the general manager of Posta Plus, a delivery company with locations in the Gulf area, Jordan, China, Egypt, North America and the UK.

Previous to becoming the chief executive officer of Zain Jordan in July 2011, he joined the Zain Sudan mobile operation as chief financial officer in March 2011.

On 7 October 2020, Bisher Al-Khasawneh named Ahmad Hanandeh as new Minister of Digital Economy and Entrepreneurship.

On 13 October 2020, he was a speaker at The Jordan Investment and Business Online Seminar, organized by the United Nations Industrial Development Organization.

== Personal life ==
Hanandeh is married and has three children.
