= Saleh al-Jumai'e =

- Born: 1939 (age 86–87); Saweira, Iraq
- Education: Academy of Fine Arts, Baghdad (1962); College of Arts and Crafts, Oakland, California (1966, 1978)
- Known for: Painting

Saleh al-Jumai'e (b. 1939 Saweira, Iraq) is an Iraqi artist noted for his works that explore the notion of tracks left by ancient heritage. His works often integrate Arabic calligraphy in an abstract artwork.

== Life and career ==
Saleh al-Jumai'e was born in 1939 in Saweira, Iraq. He was among the first generation of students to graduate from the new Academy of Fine Arts in 1962. He and his cohort were taught by the first generation of contemporary Iraqi artists including Hafidh al-Droubi and Jawad Saleem, who promoted the idea of integrating ancient heritage within abstract artworks. Before long, the younger artists, including Al-Jumaie rebelled against traditional art styles and wanted to explore the use of new materials and media such as collage, aluminum and mono-type.

In 1965, shortly after graduating, al-Jumai'e co-founded the artists' group known as the 'Innovationists'. This group, which was short-lived, lasting just four years, consisted of a younger artists including: Salim al-Dabbagh, Faik Husein and Ali Talib, who along with Al-Jumaie began using new media in highly experimental ways.

In 1965, he was nominated for a Ministry of Education scholarship which allowed him to study at the Californian College of Arts and Crafts in Oakland and graduated with a Bachelor of Fine Arts. Following his return to Baghdad, he co-founded another artists' group. The Al-Ru’yah al-Jadida ['New Vision Group']. Founded in 1968, by al-Jumai'e along with artists Ismail Fatah Al Turk; Muhammed Muhr al-Din, Hashimi al-Samarchi, Rafa al-Nadiri and Dia Azzawi, the group represented a free art style where many artists believed that they needed to be true to their own era, and encouraged the idea of freedom of creativity within a framework of heritage.

In 1979, he left Iraq for political reasons, and in 1981 he and his family settled in Almeda, California where he worked as a freelance graphic artist.

== Work ==
Al-Jumaie and his cohort including Amer al-Obaidi, Salman Abbas and Nida Kadhim became the group of artists that defined 1960s Iraqi art. Although al-Jumaie is best remembered as a painter, he also designed posters and produced a number of book covers. His early work features Arabic lettering, but over time the calligraphy became fainter.

His interest in exploring new media and materials was maintained throughout his career. The art critic, Jabra Ibrahim Jabra wrote of the artist's capacity to combine ancient and modern as well as abstract and figurative styles:

"Saleh al Jumaie was very particular about his medium; typically a mixture of metal (mostly aluminium) and acrylic. The artist's roots, however, are in the archaeological sites of ancient Iraqi cultures: but his contemporary awareness feeds these roots and brings about in his work a haunting mixture of the beautiful and the agonized. His non-figurative almost monochromatic structures are very rarely completely abstract, just as his figurative compositions seem to aspire to the condition of the abstract; both are tense, time-laden, and haunting.

The idea of tracks left by tradition is a theme that Jumaie takes up in much of his work. For example, Pages from Old Books is a series of mixed media artworks that creates an illusion of surfaces on which fragments of script have been written. The notion of traces is particularly evident in one of his best-known works, Bullet Trace (1967); a powerful work that deals with the shock of the six day war.

Examples of his work can be found in the National Gallery of Jordan permanent collection; the Museum of Modern Art, Baghdad; The Municipality of Olsq; The Arab Monetary Fund, Abu Dhabi and The International Labor Organization, Geneva.

Select list of artworks

- Bullet Trace, 1967 oil on gesso on canvas 129.5 x 90.2 cm (51 x 35½in)
- Old Walls c. 1977 series, mixed media on canvas

== See also ==
- Iraqi art
- List of Iraqi artists
