= Chabbi =

Chabbi is a Tunisian surname. Notable people with the surname include:

- Jacqueline Chabbi (born 1943), French historian
- Lassaad Chabbi (born 1961), Tunisian football manager
- Seifedin Chabbi (born 1993), Austrian footballer
