= Khairi Al-Hindawi =

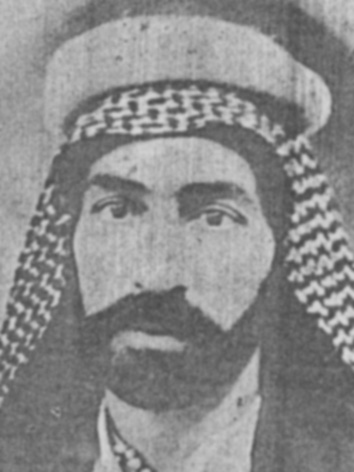
- Born: 1885; Diyala, Ottoman Empire
- Died: 29 January 1957 (aged 71–72); Adhamiyah, Baghdad, Iraq

Khairuddin bin Saleh bin Abdul Qadir bin Khudhur Al-Hindawi Al-Hassani (Arabic:خيرالدين بن صالح بن عبدالقادر بن خضر الهنداوي الحسني) was an Iraqi poet and a governor of several provinces.

== Family ==
His family goes back to Hashim ibn 'Abd Manaf, the grandfather of Mohammed. They called Khairi (Al-Hindawi) because his great grandfather, Khudhur, studied on the hands of an Indian scientist, called Ghulam Rasool Punjapi. Khairi's family were from Bab al-Sheikh in Baghdad. His grandfather, Abdul Qadir, was the agent of the family of al-Gilani in directing their properties. Khairi's father also encouraged him to learn poetry and write it.

== Moving and Education ==
He was born in the village of Abu Saeda in Diyala Province from an Arabian father and a Turkish mother. When he was five, he moved with his family to Baghdad, where he learned the basics writing, reading and a little bit of Quran. Khairi's mind was bigger than his age, so he didn't receive that much information from schools and mosques. He also couldn't go to military school, because it was only for Baghdadis. After three years, he moved with his family to Amarah, where he entered another school. After a year and a half, they moved to Qal'at Saleh. They came back to Amarah, and stayed for a number of months, before returning to Abu Saeda. They moved to Diwaniyah where his father was employed as the director of the township of Afak. Khairi studied grammar on the hands of Mustafa Al-Wa'iz, then he studied Arabic language on the hands of Hussein Al-Shera'. After a year and a half, Khairi started studying on the hands of Alaa Ad-Din Al-Alusi, the judge of the province. He traveled to Shannafiya, where poets from Basra and Najaf go to read their poetry. When he read hid poetry, he sensed that he should learn grammar more. Khairi studied grammar on the hands of Jaafar Nassar, then by Ali Al-Tareihi and then by Mohammed Al-Sammawi.

== Ottoman Era ==
In 1906, he was employed as an agent in the company of MacAndrews in Wasit that abstracted licorice and issued it to other countries. His life began to get better, and he was getting an excellent amount of salary, it was 12 gold lira. When World War I started, he was called as a forced soldier in the Ottoman military. He served in the military for three years, before getting arrested and imprisoned. The Ottomans wanted to murder him and throw his body in the river, because the British troops were near Baghdad. It was a mass chaos in the Ottoman lines, which made him escape and disappear in the locality of Mahdiya, in one of his nephew's house. He felt desperate and sad. He even wanted to commit suicide and get rid of his self-torture.

== British and Independent Iraq ==
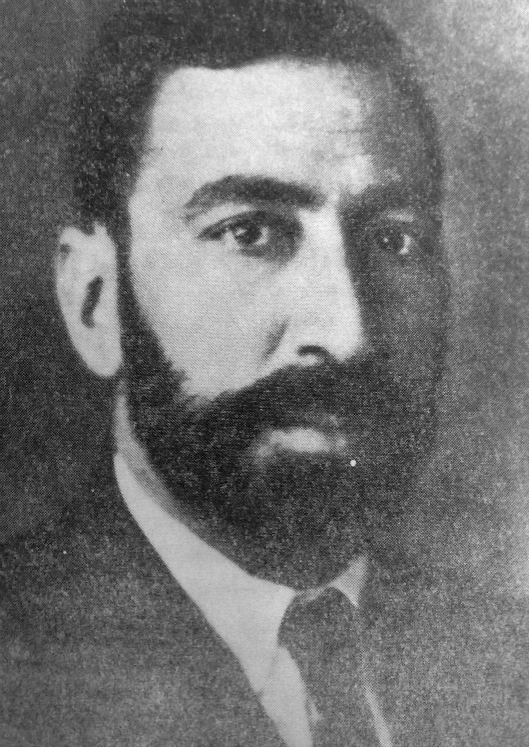
Khairi Al-Hindawi in 1927

When the British troops reached the bridge of Khur, he went out of his lair to find Baghdad in the hands of Great Britain. He was thrilled about the British invasion, because they are the ones that made him escape from his death in the prison. Everybody hated the Ottomans and always wished that anybody could free Iraq from them, but after they saw the British troops, they realized that the Ottomans were closer to them, more understanding to their culture, more nurturing, because they were both Muslims. Only the Iraqi Iraqi Jews celebrated the British, wanting to win them on their side. Khairi was concerned about the Jews, so he called his friend Abdul Majeed Al-Shawi and told him that if they win the British on their side, they will rule the situation. They agreed on making a meeting in Adhamiyah that includes the opinion leaders, intellectuals and nobles to discuss the situation. Khairi didn't express his opinion, because of his fear of going back to the Ottoman Army. He was tricked by the words of Frederick Stanley Maude: "We came as liberators, not conquerors." So, he sometimes defends the British out of fear. He also wrote an article in Al-Muqtatif praising the British. Because of that, he was employed in 1917.

The popular anger started to rise, and the people started to get resentful from the British. They started making meetings and sessions, where they complain about the British government. The British administer couldn't go to them, fearing that they will kill him, so he sent Khairi, an Arab employee, to reason with them. He went to one of their session and saw their resentment and anger. Iraq's greatest nobles and intellectuals called for the revolution. They wanted Ali bin Hussein to be Iraq's king. Khairi went to the revolutionaries to calm them down about the revolution, but in deep down in his heart, he didn't want the British either. When he heard the national poetry and revolutionary people demanding their country's wealth, he forgot his fear and started cheering for them and cursing the British. He started to read poetry, encourage people for vengeance against the British troops and demanding independence. On 1 May 1917, he became the bailiff of Swayra division. His salary was 11,250 dinars. He resumed for two months, in June, until the British called him to investigate with him, because of an article he wrote in the journal of Sada Al-Islam, cursing the British. He worked at a lot of jobs, until he was exiled to Hengam Island, because of his hatred to the British. He came back on 1 April 1921.

== Later life ==
He was close to King Faisal. Faisal always consults Khairi in any situation. Sometimes Faisal forget his ideas and depend on Khairi's. He also had the trust of one of Iraq's prime ministers, Yasin al-Hashimi. The government didn't trust him at first, because of his articles against the British, but after the Great Iraqi Revolution of 1920 and the crowning of King Faisal, he became one of Iraq's most noble men.

== Careers ==
- 1906 - Agent for The MacAndrews Company.
- 1914 - Forced soldier in the Ottoman military
- 1 May 1917 - Bailiff of Swayra division.
- 20 April 1918 - Assistant director of finance in Azeziya in Hillah.
- 7 August 1918 - Director of finance in Jarboeiya in Hillah
- ???? - Assistant Governor of Jarboeiya in Hillah.
- 15 April 1921 - Manager of Jarboeiya in Hillah
- 1 May 1922 - Mayor of Shamiya.
- 1925 - Mayor of Hindiya
- 1926 - Mayor of Ali Al-Gharbi in Maysan
- ???? - Governor of Muntafiq
- 1933 - Governor of Kut.
- 1934 - Assistant Director of lands settlement in Salman Pak.
- 1935 - Director of lands settlement in Abu Gharaq, Kafal and the Western Column.
- 1936 - Director of lands settlement in Hindiya
- ???? - Director General of properties and public lands
- 1939 - Director General of lands settlement
- 1941 - Director of lands settlement rights
- 1 January 1950 - Retired

He served in Iraq for 31 years, 7 months.

== See also ==
- Iraqi history
- Ottoman Iraq
- Arab Writers Union
- Kingdom of Iraq
