= Muhammad Mufaku =

Kosovar Albanian Syrian scholar and retired professor of Middle East studies

- Born: Muhammad Mufaku al-Arnaut; 1952 (age 73–74); Damascus, Syria
- Education: Damascus University; Pristina University
- Occupations: scholar, professor

Muhammad Mufaku al-Arnaut (Arabic: الارناؤوط، محمد موفق،; born 1952) is a Kosovar Albanian Syrian and retired professor of Middle East studies.

Muhammad Mufaku was born (1952) in Damascus, Syria. He graduated from Damascus University with a degree in Arabic language and literature. Mufaku completed his master's and doctorate degrees in comparative literature and history at Pristina University, Kosovo. Later Mufaku taught at Pristina University and was based in its Department of Oriental Studies until 1987 when he was expelled by the Milošević government of Yugoslavian Serbia. In Jordan he became a professor of modern history and taught in a number of its universities such as Yarmouk University in Irbid and later was a lecturer at Al al-Bayt University in Mafrak until his retirement in 2018. During that time, Mufaku became the director of the House of Wisdom Institute, was a member of the Syrian Arab Academy of Sciences and a member of the Academy of Sciences and Arts of Kosovo. In the late 2010s, Mufaku was also elected by the assembly of the Oriental Studies Institute in Pristina as its director.

Mufaku has written more than 30 books and over 100 articles in the Arabic and Albanian languages. His works have focused on Albanian history, Arab-Albanian relations, Albanian diaspora writings in Arabic and Balkan Islamic subjects. Mufaku has authored some pioneering works, due to his ability of researching Balkan and Arabic sources. In parts of the Levant, the Gulf, North Africa and the Muslim areas of the Balkans, Mufaku is recognised for his scholarly works, and in the Arab world he is considered an expert on Islam in the Balkans. Some works by Mufaku have aimed to reacquaint Arabic readers with the historical Muslim presence in the Balkans, an area of study often neglected in Middle Eastern academia.

In 2012, Mufaku was decorated with the Medal of Merit by Kosovo's president.
