= Salim al-Dabbagh =

Iraqi painter and installation artist

- سالم الدبَاغ
- Born: 1941; Mosul, Iraq
- Died: April 12, 2022; San Diego, U.S.
- Education: Institute of Fine Arts, Baghdad (1965); Graphic design, Lison (1967-68)
- Known for: Painter, sculptor and installation artist
- Movement: Abstract art
- Website: Official website

Salim al-Dabbagh (1941- 5 December 2022) was an Iraqi painter and installation artist noted for abstract work that references Iraqi traditions. He was one of the founders of the Innovationists Group; an artists' collective that helped to shape modern art in Iraq. He was the Head of the Graphic Department at the Institute of Fine Arts in Baghdad from 1971 to 2000.

== Life and career ==
Salim al-Dabbagh was born in Mosul, Iraq in 1941. As a child he observed locals engaged in traditional craft-work, which helped him to develop a love of local tradition and culture. He was fascinated by the women using goat hair to weave tents on the streets and in the squares. He would later use this as a source of inspiration for his artwork.

He obtained a degree in painting from the Baghdad Institute of Fine Arts in 1965. He was then awarded a scholarship by the Calouste Gulbenkian Foundation to undertake a two-year course in graphic arts in Lisbon (1967–68). He began painting in an abstract style as a student of Roman Artymowski, the Polish artist used circular geometric forms. However, al-Dabbagh, who wanted to reference the nomads' tents he had observed as a child, was enchanted by rectangular forms.

He was an active participant in the Iraqi arts community. In 1965, he was one of the founders of the art group known as Al-Mujadidin (The Innovationists) whose members included Salman Abbas, Amer al-Obaidi, Saleh al-Jumai'e, Faik Husein, Nida Kadhim and Talib Makki, The membership of this group comprised younger members of Iraq's arts scene, and especially those who wanted to experiment with different media and who often chose war and conflict as key themes for their artwork and was one of the more enduring of all Iraq's art groups. The group held its first exhibition in 1965 at the National Gallery of Modern Art where all members exhibited works.

Al-Dabbagh worked as an art and graphic design professor and served as Head of the Graphic Design Department at Baghdad's Institute of Fine Arts (1971-2000) and has also worked as a consultant to Iraqi fashion houses.

Al-Dabbagh later left Iraq and moved to the United States, where he died of old age on December 5, 2022.

== Awards ==
Al-Dabbagh has been the recipient of multiple awards including:

- 1987 Bronze Medal, Cairo
- 1986 Inter Graphic Award, Berlin, East Germany
- 1985 Miro Picasso Award, Arab Spanish League, Baghdad and Madrid
- 1980 Inter Graphic in Berlin in East Germany
- 1978 The Golden Sail Award in Kuwait
- 1966 Honourable Mention at the Leipzig International Art Exhibition on Acrylic Art, Germany

== Work ==
Al-Dabbagh has held several solo exhibitions in Baghdad, Lisbon, Kuwait and Beirut. His work is conspicuously abstract; however, the sources of inspiration evident in his paintings are distinctly Iraqi. The Kaaba (cube) is his primary source of inspiration, but he also uses other geometric forms. The colours he favours are black and white, a reference to the black and white tents as used by Bedouin nomads.

== See also ==
- Iraqi art
- List of Iraqi artists
