= Sheikh Qadib al-Ban =

12th-century Iraqi Sufi mystic and Muslim scholar

Qadib al-Ban

Personal life
- Born: 11th century Mosul, Iraq
- Died: 1174 Bab Sinjar, Mosul, Iraq
- Resting place: Qadib al-Ban Mosque in Mosul, Iraq
- Occupation: Muslim scholar

Religious life
- Religion: Islam
- Denomination: Sunni
- Jurisprudence: Hanbali
- Tariqa: Qadiriyya
- Creed: Athari
- Movement: Sufism

Qadib al-Ban (Arabic: قضيب البان) full name Abu 'Abd Allah al-Husayn ibn Isa ibn Yahya ibn Ali al-Hasani (died 1174), was a Muslim scholar and Sufi mystic who lived in Mosul, Iraq. He belonged to the Hanbali school of Islamic thought and was a disciple of Abdul Qadir al-Jilani.

== Biography ==
Qadib al-Ban al-Mawsili was a well-known Muslim scholar of the Hanbali school of thought, who was mentored by Abdul Qadir al-Jilani. He also married one of Abdul Qadir al-Jilani's daughters. The renowned spiritual philosopher Ibn Arabi, in his work Al-Futuhat al-Makkiyya, said that in his travel to Mosul, he was able to meet with Qadib al-Ban who demonstrated to the awed philosopher some of his mystical talents and capabilities.

== Tomb ==
Qadib al-Ban died in 1174 and was buried in his house. His house was reconstructed in the Seljuk period as a mosque and mausoleum by the governor of Mosul, Ahmad ibn Salih, in 1123, only to be renovated years later during the Ottoman period. The site was completely rebuilt in 1958 but received another renovation in 1965.

=== 2014 destruction ===
When ISIL took control of Mosul in 2014, the mosque and mausoleum of Qadib al-Ban were detonated using an IED. It is currently being rebuilt and is under construction.

== See also ==
- List of Sufis
