= Albanians in Syria =

Branch of the Albanian diaspora in Syria

Shqiptarët në Siri

Languages
- Albanian, Levantine Arabic

Related ethnic groups
- Albanians

Albanians in Syria (Albanian: Shqiptarët në Siri) constitute a community of about 5,000 to 10,000 inhabitants, primarily in the cities of Damascus, Hama, Aleppo and Latakia. Albanians in Syria are known as الأرناؤوط (Arnā’ūṭ).

== Location ==
Damascus has specific Albanian (Arnaut) neighborhoods, which date back to the early 20th century. Among the best known is the Al Diwaniyah neighborhood, colloquially known as Arnaut Mahala (Albanian neighbourhood) where the Masjid Arnaut (Albanian Mosque) is located, built by Vehbi Sulejman Gavoçi an Albanian originating from Shkodër. Another neighbourhood of Damascus where many Albanian families live is the Al Kadam neighborhood.

== History ==
=== Albanian migration from the Balkans ===
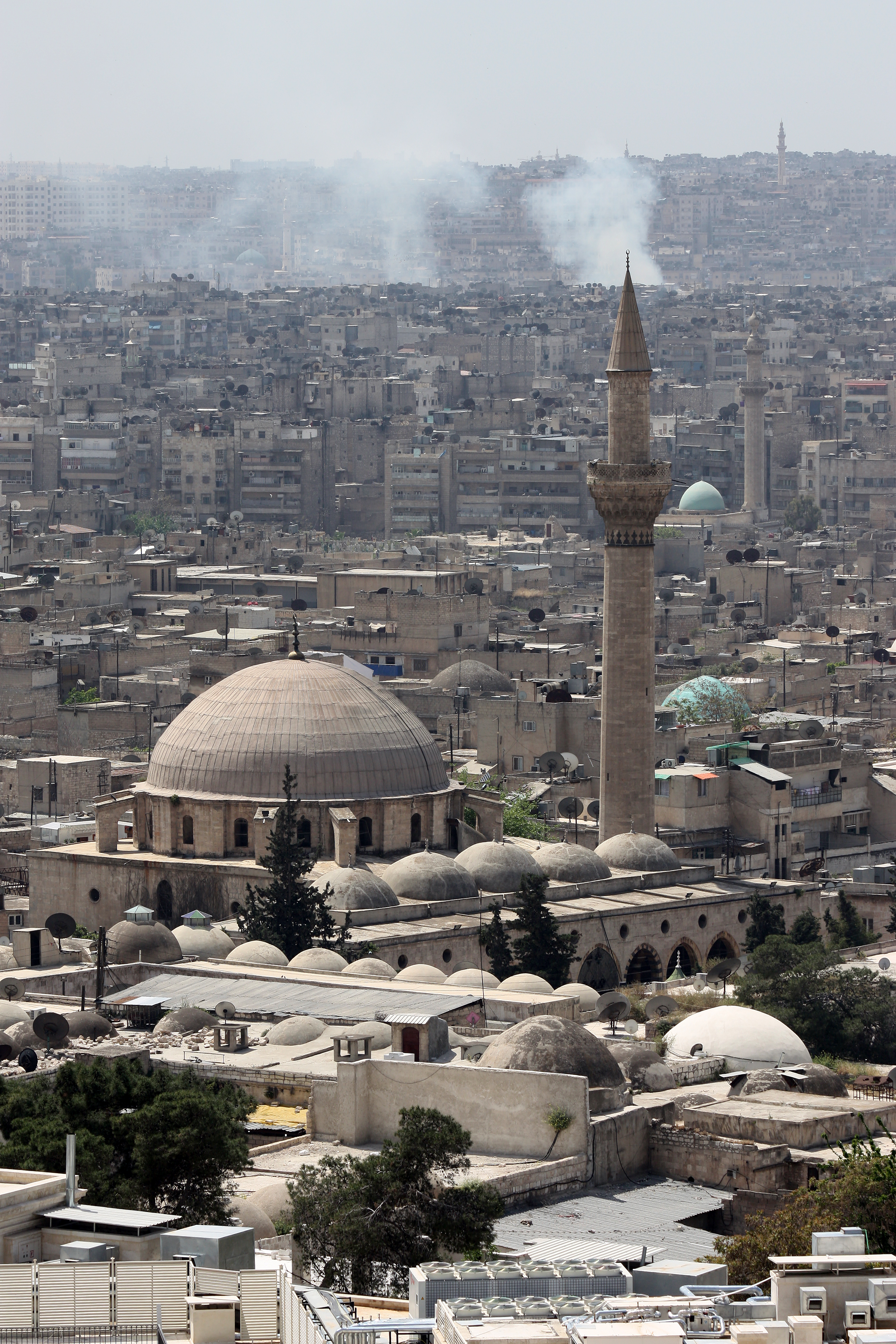
Al-Adiliyah Mosque in Aleppo was commissioned in the 16th century by Dukaginzade Mehmed Pasha, son of Dukaginzade Ahmed Pasha. The Dukaginzade would become one of the principal families of Aleppo in the Ottoman era

The incorporation of Syria into the Ottoman Empire brought Janissary soldiers to urban centres of Syria such as Damascus, of which Albanians recruited from the Balkans in the seventeenth century were a noticeable presence alongside other Ottoman troops from different ethnicities. During that era Albanians served in other capacities like Sinan Pasha from Topojan who for a time was a governor in the area.

The beginning of a settled Albanian community in Syria begins in the early 19th century. At the time some Albanians in the army of the Egyptian leader, Ottoman-Albanian Muhammad Ali Pasha refused to go back with the military to Egypt. Some 100-200 families left Egypt and settled in Syria and later some of their number assimilated while retaining memories of their origin.

Albanians in larger numbers migrated to Syria during the late 19th and early 20th century. The largest wave of migrants in Syria was during 1912–1913, when Albanians fled the Balkan Wars. Albanians from Shkodër, Albania arrived in 1924 and settled in Damascus and other Albanians came from Yugoslavia in 1931 fleeing persecution from Serbs.

From the Ottoman era until contemporary times a tradition of migration has continued whereby Albanian Muslim scholars and students migrated to Damascus, some to perfect their Arabic. Some of these individuals stayed and settled in neighbourhoods such as Suq Saruja and Suq al-Muhajirin. Some individuals within the Albanian community were Sufis and also served as a bridgehead for the spread of Sufism back in the homeland. Overall though, Albanian Muslim clergy in Damascus are conservative due to the dominance of Sunni Islam and that is reflected in many of their religious works in Arabic. Albanian Muslim scholars have left their mark on Islamic scholarship and prominent Albanian Muslim religious figures from Syria include Muhammad Nasiruddin al-Albani and Abdul Qader Arnaout. In contemporary times other Albanians in Syria have as artists, novelists, poets, short story writers, literary critics and dramatists contributed to Syrian society through their endeavours and works. Albanians have also contributed to the economic, political and military sectors of Syria.

In the early 2020s, knowledge of the Albanian language persists among the elderly. Efforts to transmit it to new generations in families were not successful and the youth do not speak Albanian apart from a few words. Intermarriage with Syrians has occurred and is accepted among the community.

=== Albanophone Balkan Egyptians ===
In Syria there exists a small community of Albanian speaking Balkan Egyptians who self-identify as Albanians and are employed in trades such as blacksmithing, metalwork and ironwork. The collapse of Ottoman rule in southern Europe due to the Balkan Wars (1912–1913) caused their ancestors to migrate and settle in Syria.

== Notable people ==
=== History and politics ===
- Dukakinzade Mehmed Pasha - Ottoman statesman and beylerbey of Aleppo
- Kara Murat Pasha – Ottoman statesman and military officer
- Küçük Ahmed Pasha - Ottoman military commander and Sipahi
- Tafil Buzi - Albanian leader and fighter

=== Military ===
- Abdul Jashari – Macedonian Albanian militant

=== Religion ===
- Muhammad Nasiruddin al-Albani – Hadith and fiqh scholar
- Abdul Qader Arnaout – Hadith scholar
- Shuaib Al Arna'ut – Hadith scholar
- Wahbi Sulayman Ghawji - Islamic Scholar

=== Academia ===
- Muhammad Mufaku Al Arnaut – professor of Middle East studies

== See also ==
- Albanians in Egypt
- Albanians in Turkey
- Albanian diaspora
