= Hadhrat al-Qadiriyya =

Sufi Islamic mosque, mausoleum, and library in Baghdad, Iraq

- ٱلْحَضْرَة ٱلْقَادِرِيَّة
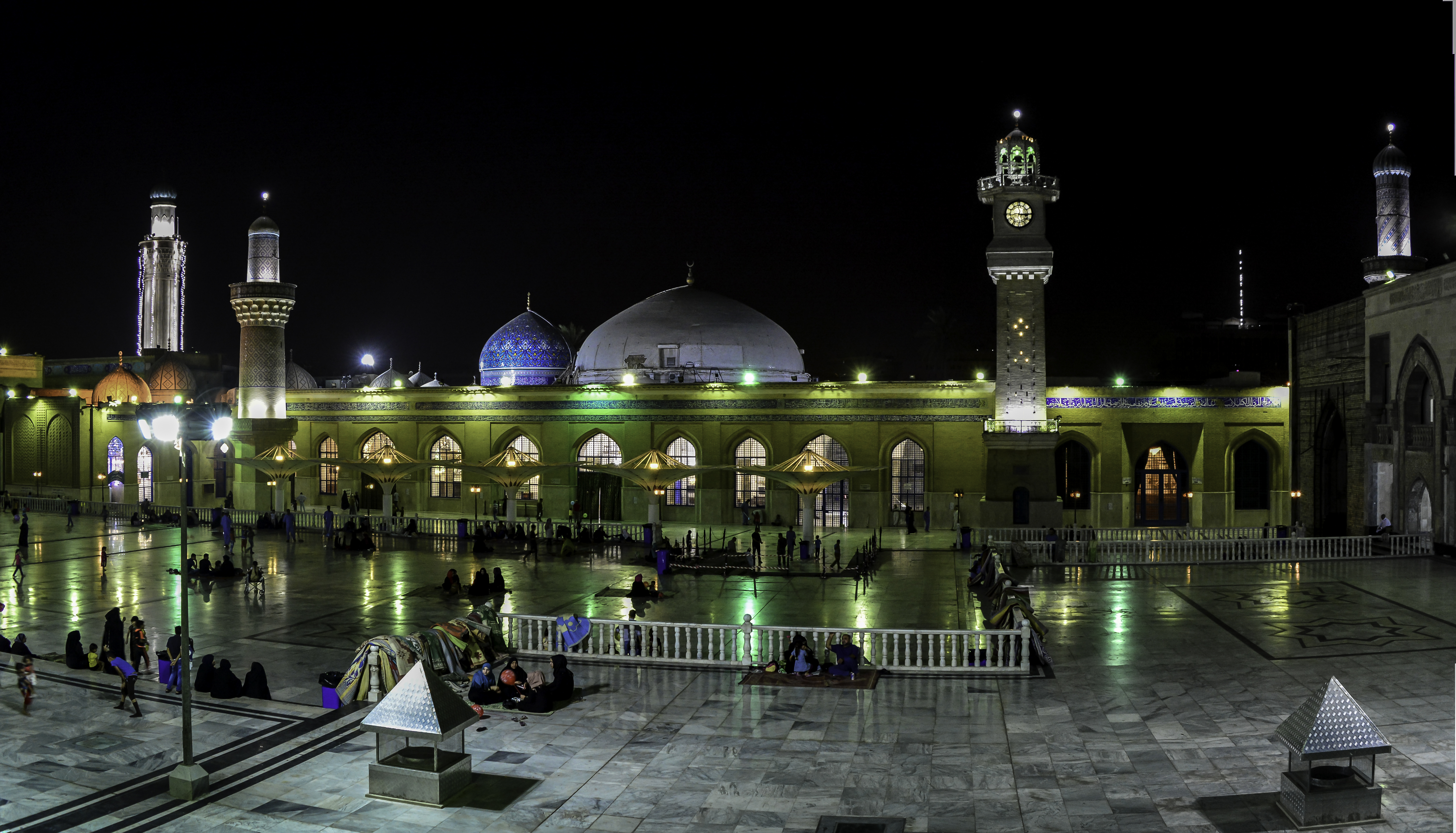
- The mausoleum complex in 2016

- Location of the complex in Baghdad

Religion
- Affiliation: Sunni Islam
- Rite: Qadiriyya Sufi
- Ecclesiastical or organizational status: Mausoleum; Mosque; Shrine; Library
- Status: Active

Location
- Location: Bab al-Sheikh in Rusafa, Baghdad
- Country: Iraq
- Interactive map of Hadhrat al-Qadiriyya
- Coordinates: 33°20′11″N 44°24′29″E

Architecture
- Type: Islamic architecture
- Style: Seljuk; Ottoman
- Completed: c. 1150s CE (madrasa); 1535 (mosque and dome); 17-20th centuries (expansion)

Specifications
- Dome: Two
- Minaret: Two
- Spire: One: (clock tower)
- Shrines: Two: Abdul Qadir al-Gilani; Abdul Razzaq al-Gilani

The Hadhrat al-Qadiriyya (Arabic: ٱلْحَضْرَة ٱلْقَادِرِيَّة, romanized: Al-Ḥaḍrat Al-Qādiriyyah; Persian: مزار غوث, romanized: Mazār Ghous), is a Sufi mausoleum, mosque, shrine and library complex, located in Baghdad, in the Baghdad Governorate of Iraq. The complex dedicated to Abdul-Qadir al-Gilani, the founder of the Qadiriyya Sufi order and its surrounding square is named al-Khilani Square. The library, known as Qadiriyya Library, houses rare old works related to Islamic Studies. The son of the entombed scholar, Abdul Razzaq al-Gilani, is also buried there.

== History ==
=== Background ===
Born in Gilan, Abdul-Qadir al-Gilani first arrived in Baghdad at the age of 18 to study in various educational institutions. He was then hired as a teacher in one of the schools near modern-day Bab al-Sheikh (Arabic: بَاب ٱلشَّيْخ, romanized: The Sheikh's Gate) in Baghdad. A madrasa was built over the sight of the modern complex for al-Gilani to lead by a Hanbali Jurist named Abu Sa'id al-Mukhrami. This madrasa became al-Gilani's residence around 1119 CE, and would expand on the complex over time with donations from wealthy merchants in the city. Construction on expanding the madrasa coincided with al-Gilani's passing in 1166 CE; after which he was buried underneath its portico. After his death, a mosque was added to the complex, and the general complex was named in his honor.

=== After Gilani's death ===
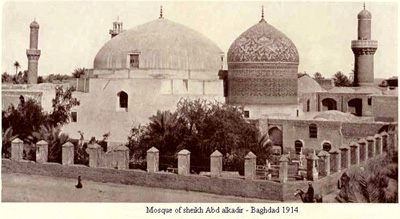
A photo of the mausoleum, taken in 1914

The complex is located in the Bāb al-Sheikh in al-Rusafa district, on the east bank of the Tigris River. This name comes from the fact that the complex is located in Bab al-Sheikh, and is where the al-Gilani family has historically lived. As well being the location of Bab al-Talsim, one of the gates of Baghdad.

During the reign of the Safavid Shah Isma'il I, Gilani's shrine was destroyed. In 1535, the Ottoman Sultan Suleiman the Magnificent had a dome built over the shrine, which still stands to this day. During the Ottoman Empire, various ruling Pashas expanded the mosque. Although not all the expansion and renovation projects were successful. Among those was an attempt to establish a mosque by Sinan Pasha on the orders of Sultan Suleiman after its destruction by the Safavids, but only a third of it was built at the time of the Pasha.

A traditional custom among Baghdadi women is that the tomb of Gilani has the power of curing the sick after certain prayer rituals are assembled. However, this tradition is discarded as a fabricated superstition by modern writers.

=== After the 2003 US invasion ===
On 28 May 2007, the complex was targeted by a car bomb attack which killed around 24 and injured 68. The attack caused serious damage to the shrine and the mosque, and destroyed the outer wall, a dome and a minaret.

Traditionally, the Qadiriyya complex held iftar and tarawih sessions during Ramadan with the mosque's kitchen cooking food for the people of the area. During the COVID-19 pandemic, the mosque was forced to close down until it was reopened for Ramadan in 2021 to let in visitors to break fast and perform tarawih.

In 2022, the former Bangladeshi ambassador to Iraq, Mohammad Fazlul Bari, visited the Qadiriyya complex and shrine. He brought a embroidered textile cover to be placed on the tomb as a gift from the government of Bangladesh. The cover was put in the presence of the complex's chief administrator, Sayyid Khalid al-Gilani, who's also the Sufi mystic's ancestor.

== Architecture ==
Built as a madrasa, a shrine was constructed following the death of Abdul Qadir al-Gilani. In 1535, Suleiman the Magnificent built a complex around the shrine, consisting of a tomb, mosque, madrasa and soup kitchens. The complex was renovated in subsequent years.

=== Mosque ===
Aligned with qibla, the roughly rectangular complex is centered on the mosque-tomb structure, enveloped by an enclosed double-portico on three sides, with an L-shaped sahn, with two iwans, and a larger walled courtyard composed of pointed arches separated by a jutting pilaster. A band of inscription runs above the arches on three sides. Inside, the ambulatory domes are supported by tall columns with capitals decorated with geometric motifs. Four restored mihrabs are carved into the mihrab wall on either side of the mosque. The single-domed mosque is entered primarily from an iwan on its northwest wall. Two side entrances from the ambulatory are located along its northeast wall. A single dome, supported on squinches covers the interior.

=== Mausoleum ===
The tomb consists of three domed rooms; the largest dome is set over the central burial chamber, carried on muqarnas squinches. It holds the saint's wooden sarcophagus and is decorated by a marble dado and mirrors on the interior. A band of inscription envelops the interior of the dome. Three other tombs, belonging to Jaylani's sons, Abduljabbar, Abd al-Rahman, and Abd al-Wahab, are located among the madrasa cells to the right of the southeast gateway.

=== Minarets ===
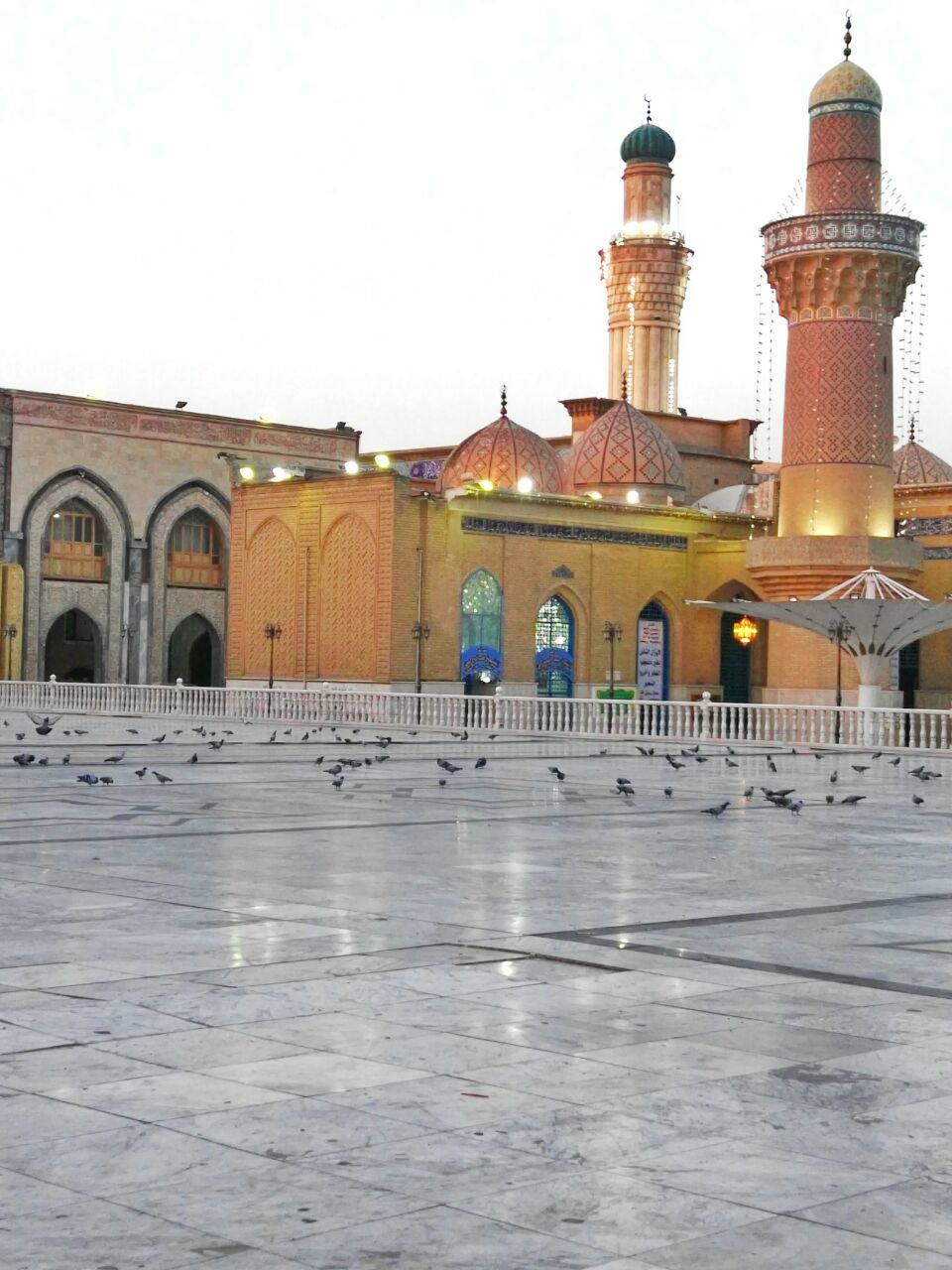
The two minarets

The mosque has two main minarets located near the entrances on the western side. A Seljuk-style minaret, dated from 1498, rises at the southern corner of the narrow, rectangular platform. It is architecturally similar to a number of minarets in Baghdad, like the one of the Murjan Mosque. It has an octagonal base, a cylindrical shaft with two balconies, and a small dome. Its balcony is held by muqarnas decorated with Kufic inscriptions on its ceramic tiles.

A clocktower, erected in 1899, occupies the opposite corner of the prayer platform in the courtyard. A second, smaller minaret was added during the Ottoman period; its cylindrical body is topped by a green-tiled conical crown.

=== Islamic Qadiriyya Library ===
The Qadiriyya complex also holds an old library and madrasa with an estimated 80,000 and 85,000 books. The library is believed to the be the biggest library in modern Baghdad after many libraries were destroyed and set ablaze in the Iraq War by American troops. The library survived the Iraq War by locking its collection in a basement, while its workers and sheikh posed as impoverished peasants.

Among the library's collections are several copies of the Qu'ran, including a gold-gilded Qu'ran donated to the library by a Syrian Sufi, in addition to many valuable early scientific texts and manuscripts including astronomy, calligraphy, and language studies. The oldest book in the collection is a 13th century Arabic language studies manuscript that survived the 1258 Mongol siege. Due to the library's vast rich collection, students are known to visit the library often to research the books and study early Islamic civilization.

== See also ==
- Al-Qadiriyya
- List of mosques in Baghdad
- Islam in Iraq
