= Hafidh al-Droubi =

Iraqi painter and art educator (1914–1991)

- حافظ الدروبي
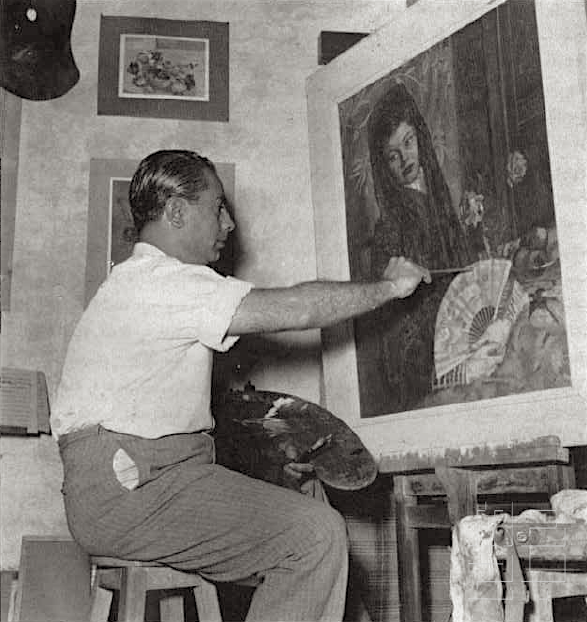
- Hafidh al-Droubi at his studio, Baghdad, 1955.
- Born: 1914; Baghdad, Ottoman Iraq
- Died: 1991 (aged 76–77); Baghdad, Ba'athist Iraq
- Education: Accademia Reale, Rome (1936); Goldsmiths College, London (1950)
- Known for: Painter, draughtsman and educator
- Movement: Cubist; Impressionist

Hafidh al-Droubi (Arabic: حافظ الدروبي; 1914–1991), also known as Hafez al-Droubi, was an Iraqi painter and draughtsman, noted for his Cubist paintings and his approach to professionalizing Iraqi art education in the early to mid 20th-century. He was a prolific painter, an important artist in The Pioneer generation, a key figure in the development of modernism in Iraq and a key figure in the development of early Iraqi art education.

== Life and career ==
Hafidh-al Droubi was born in Bab al-Sheikh, Baghdad, in 1914. As a young student at the Bab al-Sheikh Primary School, he was introduced to painting and drawing and learned the techniques of European academic art in terms of proportions, anatomy and perspective. His conservative family disapproved of his passion for painting, which they considered the 'work of the devil'. In the 1920s, his uncle regularly threatened to cut him off if he persisted with art. However, his allowance continued and he used the money to purchase art supplies.

In 1936, he received a scholarship to study in Rome, graduating from the Accademia Reale. Due to the outbreak of war, his studies were interrupted and he returned to Baghdad for a brief period, during which he opened a free atelier in Baghdad, dedicated to giving aspiring artists access to studio space and resources for their practice. He served as the dean of the Academy of Fine Arts in Baghdad.

After the war, he returned to his art studies, enrolling at Goldsmiths College, London, and graduating with a Bachelor of Arts degree in 1950.

On his permanent return to Baghdad, he became very active in the formation and development of Iraq's arts community. He was an early member of The Pioneers art group, Iraq's first formal arts society. He co-founded the first Iraqi Fine Art Society (also known as the Friends of Art) in 1941 which not only aimed to encourage social interaction between artists, but also to develop the artistic taste of the general public. This group also organized annual art exhibitions to promote the work of local artists. In 1953, he formed the Impressionists art collective, which consisted of fellow artists and some of his students, including Dia Azzawi. In spite of its name, the group did not dictate that members follow Impressionism exclusively, rather it encouraged artists to experiment with a variety of different styles.

He was among the first group of teachers at the Baghdad College of Fine Arts, and went on to become Dean of the Iraqi Fine Arts Academy. As an art educator, al-Droubi was not committed to any particular style or genre. Instead, he encouraged his students to experiment with a variety of different styles.

Although he was a prolific painter, he is mainly remembered for his contribution to art education: professionalizing the art industry and developing a coherent pedagogy for the teaching of art in the early to mid-20th century.

== Work ==
Al-Droubi was a highly experimental painter; at different times in his career he followed Impressionism, Cubism, Surrealism and Futurism, however, is arguably best known for using Cubist works to depict local themes.

While his techniques were primarily based on Western art movements, he never abandoned Iraqi society and art traditions. He sought to adapt Western art for a uniquely Iraqi audience, culture and experience. He often used Iraqi themes for his subject matter, preferring to paint scenes of everyday life. During the latter years of Hashemite rule in Iraq, he took advantage of Iraq’s social, political and economic ties with Britain to help forge a tapestry of cultural borrowing and adaptation, whilst preserving facets of Iraqi tradition and themes. Specifically, he painted scenes of Baghdad, its streets, its markets and its people to the extent that he became known as the "City Painter".

Select list of major works

- Life in Babylon, mural, formerly located in the Babylonian Rooms of the Old Museum
- Life in Hattra, formerly located in the Babylonian Rooms of the Old Museum

== Awards and recognition ==
At the Al Wasiti Festival of fine arts in 1972, al-Droubi was one of the four artists honored by the state.

== See also ==
- Iraqi art
- List of Iraqi artists
