= Nida Kadhim =

Iraqi sculptor

- Born: 1937 (age 88–89); Iraq
- Education: Baghdad Institute of Fine Arts; Accademia di Belle Arti (Rome)
- Known for: Sculpture

Nida Kadhim (born 1937 Iraq) is an Iraqi sculptor, noted for producing a number of monumental works for Baghdad's city centre, some of which are still standing, while others were demolished or looted following the 2003 Iraqi invasion.

== Life and career ==
Nida Kadhim's life and career was marked by the revolutions and wars that beset Iraq in the second half of the 20th century. Kadhim received his formal art education at Baghdad's Academy of Fine Arts in the 1950s. Actively involved in the Iraqi arts community, he became a founding member of the art group known as Al-Mujadidin (The Innovationists) formed by Salim al-Dabbagh, and whose members included Salim al-Dabbagh, Salman Abbas, Amer al-Obaidi, Saleh al-Jumai'e, Faik Husein and Talib Makki. The group held its first exhibition at the National Gallery of Modern Art where members all exhibited works.

Like many artists who belonged to influential art groups, Kadhim found work at Iraq's Ministry of Culture. However, when Saddam Hussein's Baath Party regime assumed power in 1968, Kadhim began to feel that he was being left out. As a Communist, who refused to join the Ba'athists, he felt himself under intense pressure to "reform". In 1976, he was expelled from his job at the Ministry of Culture.

In 1976, he left Iraq and travelled to Rome, where he enrolled at the Accademia di Belle Arti. In Italy, he lived a bohemian and carefree lifestyle, and managed to support himself by selling sketches or bartering them in exchange for food and clothing.

In 1983, he returned to Iraq in 1983 only to see his 24-year-old brother, a recent graduate of film school in Paris, arrested and executed for evading Army conscription during the Iraq–Iran War. In the following years, he witnessed first hand how Saddam Hussein's regime controlled art in all its forms.

In 2003, he was again witness to horrific violence on his people and their culture. In an interview with a media outlet, he explained that the US military entered the empty streets, broke the doors and windows of historic sites, and this would be followed by seemingly organized groups of people who would burn and destroy what was in the museums.

== Work ==
His sculptures focus on grandiose busts and statues of leading figures taken from Iraq's history, or are based on other themes the artist considers worthy. A series of statues depicting eight Iraqi physicians from the Abbasid era that once stood in local hospitals were destroyed during the looting that followed the 2003 invasion. He is currently working on the restoration of Baghdad's statues.

His most well-known sculpture, which is still standing, is the Arab Woman in Zawra Park, Baghdad. It depicts an Arab woman holding a bouquet of flowers out to the new generation of Iraqis who are seeking a better future.

== See also ==
- Iraqi art
- List of Iraqi artists
