= Amer al-Obaidi =

- عامر العبيدي
- Born: 1943 (age 82–83); Al Najaf, Iraq
- Education: BA (Fine Arts), Baghdad University 1969
- Known for: Painter, sculptor and illustrator
- Spouse: Sawsan Abdulkarim (schoolteacher)

Amer al-Obaidi (born 1943, Al Najaf) is an Iraqi-born painter, now residing in the United States, who is noted for artwork that emphasises Iraqi folklore and tradition.

== Life and career ==
Amer Al Obaidi was born in Al Najaf in 1943 into a large, wealthy, Muslim family. As a boy of 10 or 11, he was fascinated by cracks in the dry dirt formed by the baking sun. So he cut out a block of earth, let it harden in the sun for two days, and used a knife to create his first sculpture. He showed it to his father, who recognized his talent and encouraged him to paint by purchasing paper, clay and pencils for the boy.

His family encouraged him to pursue painting as a career. He obtained a BA in Fine Arts from Baghdad University in 1969. His artistic talents came to public attention, when at age of 22, he was awarded the first place at an International Arts Festival in Ibiza, Spain.

Al-Obaidi prepared illustrations for local newspapers and magazines, and illustrated certain children's books. He became involved in the Iraqi arts community by joining the art group known as Al-Mujadidin (The Innovationists) whose notable members included Salman Abbas, Salim al-Dabbagh, Saleh al-Jumai'e, Faeq Hassan, Nida Kadhim and Talib Makki. The group held its first exhibition at the National Gallery of Modern Art where members all exhibited works.

After graduating, Al-Obaidi began working in administrative positions in Iraq's art museums, working his way up to the key role of Director of National Museum of Modern Art in Baghdad, a position he held from 1973 to 1983. Later, he was the General Director of Fine Arts of Iraq and also taught in Saudi Arabia for three years. While in Saudi Arabia, he completed a Wall Carpet for the King Abdulaziz International Airport in Jeddah. Throughout this period, he continued to paint, but in 1995 he quit his administrative roles to focus exclusively on working as practising artist.

In 2006, Al-Obaidi's family suffered a tragedy when Amer’s son, Bader, was killed by a roadside bomb in Baghdad, while waiting for his father and sister in a shopping precinct. Amer’s wife, Sawsan, also suffered horrific injuries in the same incident, losing part of her eyesight and ultimately having her leg amputated. Following this event, the family relocated to Syria and in 2008, were relocated to Iowa, United States through the UNHCR.

Al-Obaidi is one of a large number of Iraqi artists who have fled Iraq and now live abroad permanently. The Ministry of Culture has estimated that more than 80% of all Iraqi artists are now living in exile.

== Work ==
Al-Obaidi’s work places a great deal of emphasis on Arabian folklore in general, and Iraqi tradition in particular. A recurring element in his paintings is the Arabian horse. He also paints works depicting his personal experiences of life in a war-torn land in an effort to alert audiences to the suffering endured by local people under the hands of the foreign occupiers.

== See also ==
- Iraqi art
- List of Iraqi artists
