= Abdul Qadir Gilani =

Muslim preacher, mystic and theologian (1078–1166)

Muhy ad-Din Abdul Qadir Gilani عبد القادر گيلانی
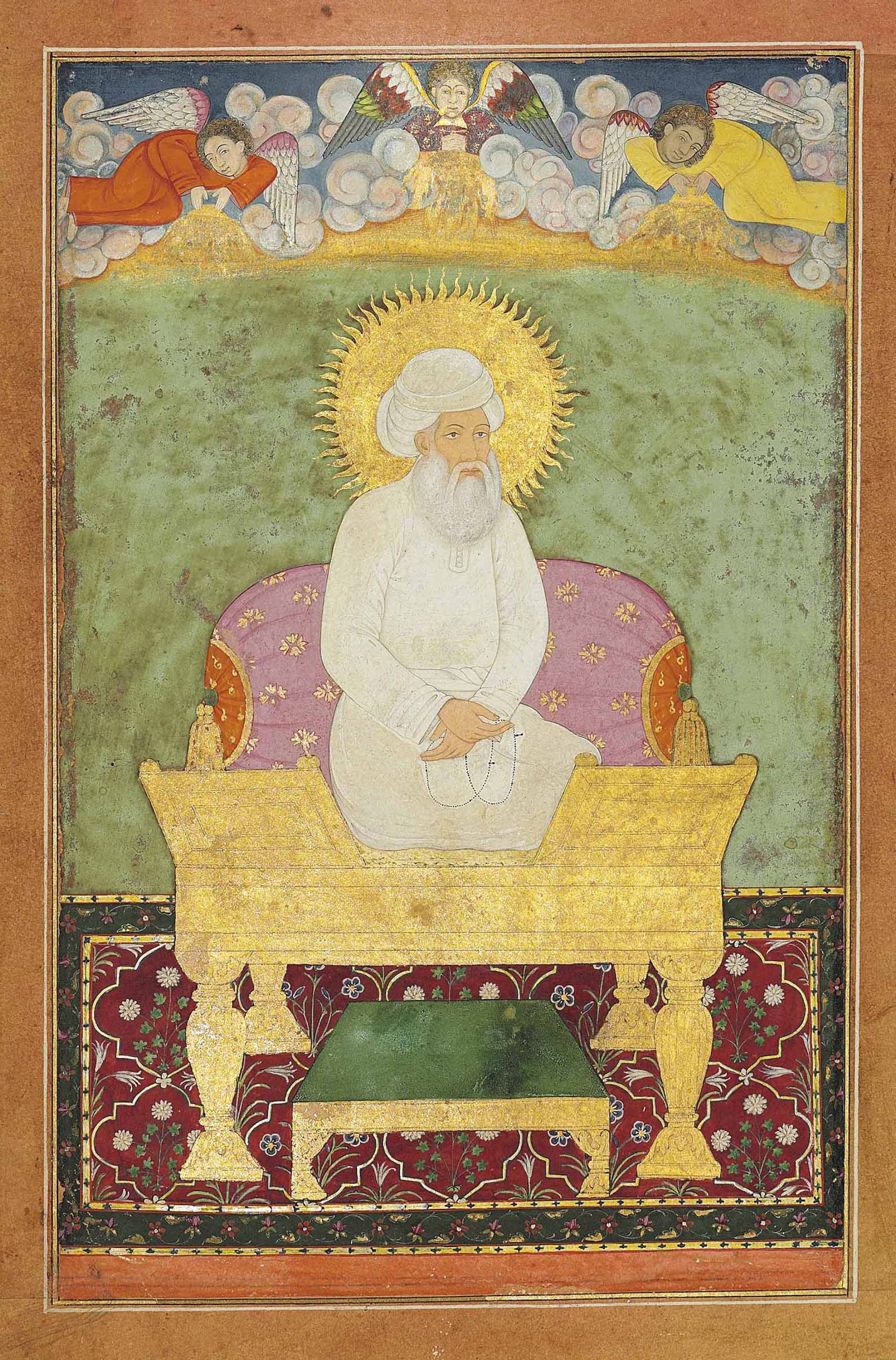
- Portrait of Abdul Qadir Gilani. Created in Mughal India in c. 1680

Personal life
- Born: 1077 or 1078 CE Gilan, Seljuk Empire (present-day Iran)
- Died: 1166 CE Baghdad, Abbasid Caliphate (present-day Iraq)
- Resting place: Hadhrat al-Qadiriyya, Baghdad; 33°20′11″N 44°24′29″E
- Children: Abdul Razzaq Gilani
- Main interest(s): Fiqh, Sufism
- Notable work: Al-Ghunya

Religious life
- Religion: Islam
- Denomination: Sunni
- Jurisprudence: Hanbali and Shafi'i
- Creed: Athari

Muslim leader
- Disciple of: Abu Saeed Mubarak Makhzoomi
- Disciples: Abdul Razzaq Gilani, Sheikh Qadib al-Ban, Ibn Qudamah

Abd al-Qadir al-Gilani (Note: (Persian: عبدالقادر گیلانی, romanized: 'Abdul Qādir Gīlānī); (Arabic: عبد القادر الجيلاني, romanized: ʿAbd al-Qādir al-Jīlānī). Full Name: Muhyid Din Abu Muhammad Abdul Qadir ibn Abi Salih Jangidost al Jilani al Hasani Arabic: محيي الدين أبو محمد عبد القادر بن أبي صالح جنگي دوست الجيلاني الحسني, romanized: Muḥyī al-Dīn Abū Muḥammad ʿAbd al-Qādir ibn Abī Ṣāliḥ Jangī Dōst al-Jīlānī al-Ḥasanī) (c. 1077 or 1078 – c. 1166), was a Persian Hanbali jurist, preacher, and Sufi mystic leader based in Baghdad. He is regarded as the eponym and founding figure of the Qadiriyya, one of the oldest Sufi orders. He is also known by the honorific Muhyi al-Dīn (Reviver of the Faith), and in later Sufi tradition, by the titles including Gawth al-Azam (the Greatest Succour) denoting his higher status among the Sufi saints. (Note: According to the Sufi Hagiographies, he made statements, in which he reportedly said: "My foot is on the necks of every saint", in reference to his station of Ghawth al-Azam.)

Gilani spent most of his adult life in Baghdad, where he studied Islamic jurisprudence and hadith, taught at a madrasa, and became known for his sermons on religious observances, ethical conduct and spiritual discipline. His reputation as a religious authority grew during the later part of his life, while accounts of his spiritual powers and elevated spiritual status became prominent in later hagiographical literature.

== Early life ==
Gilani was born around c. 1077 or 1078 in Gilan, a region on the southwestern shore of the Caspian Sea in present-day Iran. Some sources identify his birthplace more specifically as Na'if near present-day Rezvanshahr. According to the 15th-century historian Ibn Taghribirdi (d. 1470), Gilani was born in Jil in Iraq, but this account is questioned by French historian Jacqueline Chabbi. Modern historians (including Lawrence) consider Gilan to be his birth place. The region was then politically semi-independent and divided between local chieftains from different clans.

His nisba, indicates an association with Gilan, while the epithet Baghdadi, refers to his residence and burial in Baghdad. During his stay in Baghdad, Gilani was called ajamii, a term that denote a non-Arab, which according to Bruce Lawrence may be because he spoke Persian alongside Arabic.

=== Family background ===
Information of Gilani's family are uncertain, some sources indicate that his father or grandfather was known by the nickname Jangi Dust, suggesting a Persian lineage.

Hagiographical sources claim Gilani to be a descendant of the Islamic prophet Muhammad through Muhammad's grandson Hasan ibn Ali. this lineage is widely accepted among many Muslims, including followers of the Qadiriyya order. Some modern scholars, including Lawrence, consider this claim inconsistent with Gilani's apparent Persian background, and suggest that it may have been emphasized or constructed by the later Hagiographers.

=== Education ===
Gilani travelled to Baghdad in 1095, where he studied Islamic jurisprudence, Hadith and other religious sciences. He studied Hanbali jurisprudence under Abu Saeed Mubarak Makhzoomi and Ibn Aqil, and studied hadith with Abu Muhammad Ja'far al-Sarraj. He was also associated with the Sufi teacher Abu'l-Khair Hammad al-Dabbas, who is described in later sources as one of his spiritual instructors.

After completing his formal studies, Gilani is said to have withdrawn from public life for an extended period, described as approximately twenty-five years of Ascetic wandering and retreat in the desserts and wilderness of Iraq.

== Teaching and preaching ==
In 1127, Gilani returned to Baghdad and began preaching publicly. He joined the teaching staff of the school established by his teacher, al-Makhzoomi, and developed a substantial following. His teaching encompassed several branches of Islamic learning. He taught Hadith, Tafsir (exegesis of Quran), and jurisprudence, while also delivering sermons concerning spiritual discipline, repentance, ethical conduct and the virtues of the Quran.

He was reported to be an effective preacher who attracted followers from diverse backgrounds, including Jews and Christians, and integrated Sufi mysticism with Islamic law. According to hagiographical sources, Gilani is reported to have converted many people to Islam through his emphasis on inner purification, ethical conduct and devotion. He established the Madrasa al-Qadiriyya in Baghdad, which became a center for Islamic learning and spirituality, offering instruction in the Quran, Hadith, Fiqh (jurisprudence), and Tasawwuf (Sufism), attracting students from various regions.

His teachings reportedly influenced political and military leaders, such as Nur ad-Din Zangi and Salahuddin Ayyubi, who respected his guidance.

== Religious thought ==
=== Jurisprudence ===
Gilani adhered to the Hanbali school of Islamic jurisprudence. He is reported to have treated Shafi'i school of jurisprudence on an equal footing with the Hanbali school, issuing fatwas according to both schools of jurisprudence. Al-Nawawi, in his book Bustan al-'Arifin (transl. Garden of the Spiritual Masters), praised Gilani for this approach, noting that "we have never known anyone more dignified than Baghdad's Sheikh Muhyi al-Din 'Abd al-Qadir al-Gilani, the Sheikh of Shafi'is and Hanbalis in Baghdad."

=== Theology ===
In al-Ghunya li-Talibi Tariq al-Haqq, a work attributed to him, Gilani presented a conception of God that emphasized divine transcendence. He described God as existing beyond time and space and rejected the attribution of corporeality, substance, accident, or physical limitation to God. These formulations reflect the theological concern with divine transcendence found in medieval Islamic discussions of God's attributes.

=== Spiritual discipline and ethics ===
The central feature of Gilani's teaching was the integration of religious law and spiritual purification (tazkiyah) of the individual from excessive attachment to worldly desires. His sermons emphasized repentance, self-discipline, sincerity, and reliance upon God.

Sufi descriptions of his teaching frequently portray the struggle against the lower self and worldly desire as a form of spiritual striving. Rather than separating mystical practice from religious law. Gilani presented spiritual development as dependent upon adherence to religious obligations.

=== Criticism of political authority ===
Hagiographical sources portray Gilani as willing to admonish political authorities. One account, transmitted by Ibn Kathir, describes Gilani's criticism of the Abbasid Caliph Al-Muqtafi li-Amr Allah after the appointment of Abu'l Wafa' Yahya, who was accused of oppressive conduct, to a judicial position. According to the account, Gilani publicly rebuked the caliph over the appointment, after which the official was removed.

Such accounts from part of the broader depiction of Gilani as a preacher who regarded the duty of enjoining good and forbidding wrong from the Quran as applying to rulers as well as ordinary Muslims. The sources similarly attributed to him criticism of scholars and religious figures who became dependent upon the rulers or pursued wealth and status. His sermon portrayed excessive attachment to political power, wealth and luxury as threats to religious integrity.

== Sufism ==
=== Qadiriyyah ===
Later accounts describe Gilani's relationship with his disciples through bay'ah an oath of allegiance or commitment to a spiritual guide (murshid). Within Sufi tradition, such an arrangement was understood as establishing a continuing relationship between teacher and disciple, through which the disciple received instruction in religious practice, ethical conduct and spiritual discipline.

Gilani is regarded as the eponym and traditional founding figure of the Qadiriyyah Sufi order. The later Qadiri tradition traced its spiritual lineage through him. The institutional development of Qadiriyya occurred over time and was substantially shaped by his descendants and disciples.

=== Hagiographical tradition ===
Gilani's reputation developed considerably after his death. Hagiographical works attributed to him an exceptional spiritual rank and numerous miracles.

In Sufi tradition he is described as a wali (saint) who attained the highest spiritual station of the a succour (ghawth), in the saintly hierarchy. (Note: According to the Sufi Hagiographies, he made statements, in which he reportedly said: "My foot is on the necks of every saint", in reference to his station of Ghawth al-Azam.) His honorific Muḥyi d-Dīn likewise came to be associated with the belief that he was a reviver of Islam.

== Death ==
Gilani died in Baghdad in 1166 CE, corresponding to 561 AH. Traditional biographical sources differ on the precise date of his death, variously placing it on the night preceding 8 or 10 Rabi' al-thani. He was buried at night in the precincts of his schoolhouse near Bab al-Azaj in Baghdad.

His urs (death anniversary) is traditionally observed annually on 11 Rabi' al-Thani.

=== Shrine ===
Hadhrat al-Qadiriyya in Baghdad in 1925

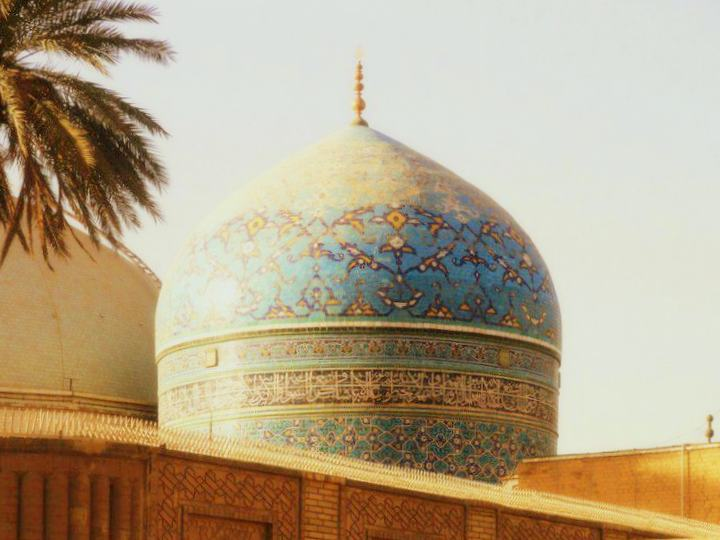
Dome at the tomb of Gilani in 2014

Gilani's tomb in Baghdad became and important site of pilgrimage. During the reign of the Safavid Shah Ismail I, the shrine was destroyed in 1508. However, in 1535, Ottoman sultan Suleiman the Magnificent commissioned the construction of a new shrine over the grave, which remains in existence today.

== Works ==
15th-century manuscript of Futuh al-Gahyb

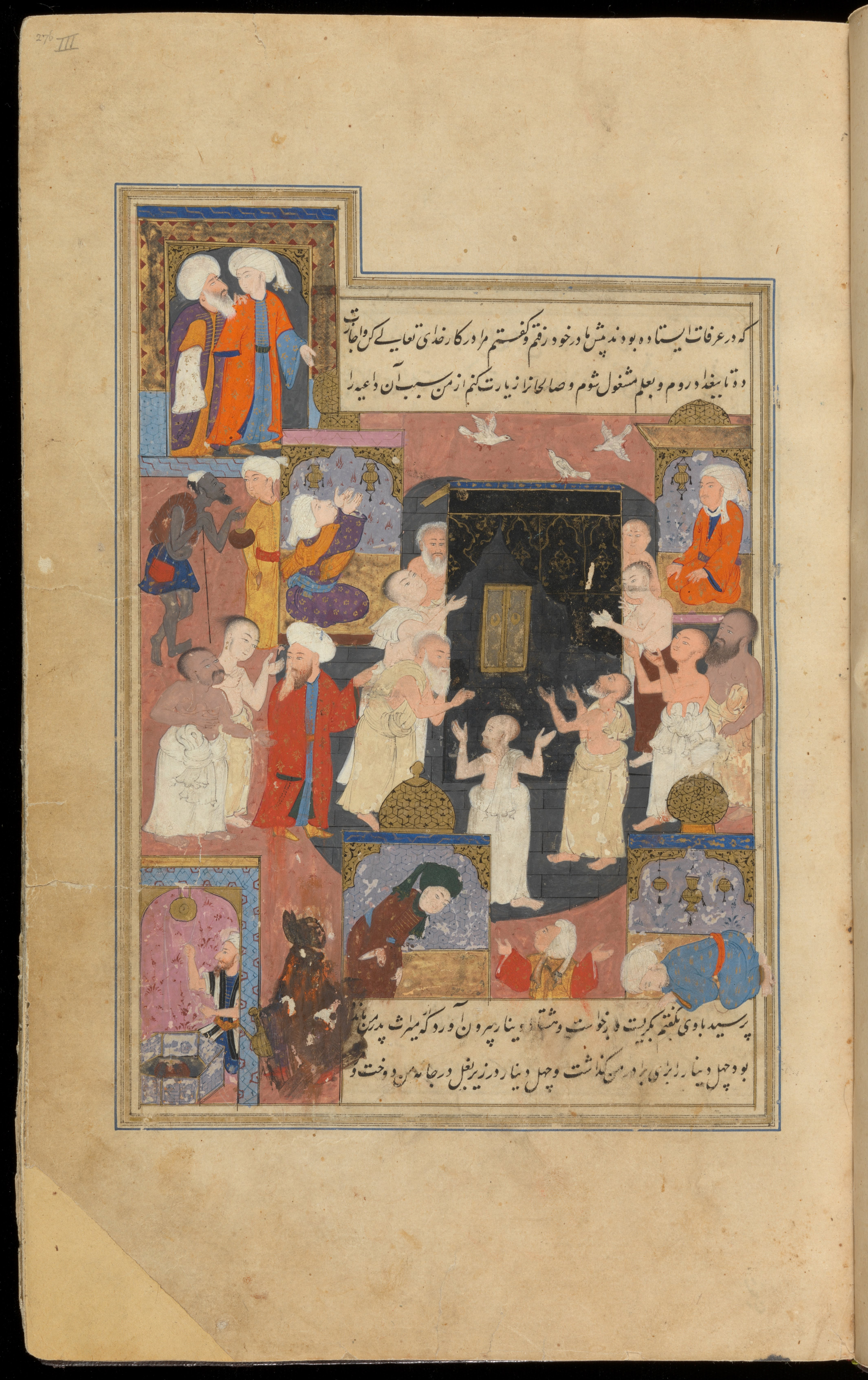
The Vision of Muhyi al-Din ibn al-Gilani. Miniature from the Ottoman (1595) manuscript of "Nafahat al-uns" (Breaths of Fellowship) of Jami. Chester Beatty Library

A number of works are traditionally attributed to Gilani. The authenticity and authorship of individual works vary, and some texts associated with his name were transmitted or compiled after his lifetime.

Among the works attributed to him are:

- Al-Ghunya li-Talibi Tariq al-Haqq (transl. Sufficient Provision for Seekers of the Path of Truth): a work dealing with Islamic belief, jurisprudence, ethics, and Sufi practice.
- Al-Fath al-Rabbani (transl. The Sublime Revelation): a collection of 62 sermons traditionally attributed to him. The discourses are traditionally dated to 1150–1152 CE.
- Futuh al-Ghayb (transl. Revelations of the Unseen): a collection of 78 discourses concerning spiritual discipline and religious practices and spiritual life.
- Jala al-Khawatir (transl. Purification of the Thoughts): a collection 62 discourses.
- Al-Fuyudat al-Rabbaniyya (transl. The Divine Outpourings): a compilation containing material associated with Gilani, including shorter religious and devotional writings.
- Sirr al-Asrar (transl. The Secret of Secrets): a short work divided into 24 chapters and traditionally attributed to him. Its authorship has been questioned.
- Khamsata 'Ashara Maktuban (transl. Fifteen Letters).

== See also ==
- List of Sufi saints
- Moinuddin Chishti
- Ahmad al-Rifa'i
- Ahmad al-Badawi

== Sources ==
- Anwar, E. (2009). "Jīlānī, ʿAbd al-Qādir al-". The Oxford Encyclopedia of the Islamic World.
- Chabbi, Jacqueline (2009). "ʿAbd al-Qādir al-Jīlānī". In Fleet, Kate; Krämer, Gudrun; Matringe, Denis; Nawas, John; Rowson, Everett (eds.). Encyclopaedia of Islam (3rd ed.). Brill Online. ISSN 1873-9830.
- Lawrence, Bruce (1982). "ʿAbd-al-Qāder Jīlānī". In Yarshater, Ehsan (ed.). Encyclopædia Iranica. Vol. I/2: ʿAbd-al-Hamīd–ʿAbd-al-Hamīd. London and New York: Routledge & Kegan Paul. pp. 132–133. ISBN 978-0-71009-091-1.
- Jonathan, Allen; Karamustafa, Ahmet T. (2014). "'Abd al-Qadir al Jilani (Gilani)". Oxford Bibliographies. doi:10.1093/OBO/9780195390155-0100.
- Madelung, Wilferd (2001). "Gīlān iv. History in the Early Islamic Period". In Yarshater, Ehsan (ed.). Encyclopædia Iranica. Vol. X/6: Germany VI–Gindaros. London and New York: Routledge & Kegan Paul. pp. 634–635. ISBN 978-0-933273-55-9.
- Masters, Bruce (2009). "Baghdad". In Ágoston, Gábor; Masters, Bruce (eds.). Encyclopedia of the Ottoman Empire. New York: Facts on File. p. 71. ISBN 978-0-8160-6259-1. LCCN 2008020716. Archived from the original on 16 May 2016.
- Schimmel, Annemarie (2022-02-22). Islam in the Indian Subcontinent. BRILL. p. 122. ISBN 978-90-04-49299-8.
- Fatoohi, Dr Louay (2004). JILA AL KHATIR (Purification of Mind) Tr by Dr. LOUAY FATOOHI. Adam Publishers & Distributors. ISBN 978-81-7435-152-4.
- Qādrī, Muḥammad Riyāz̤ (2007). The Sultan of the saints. Adam Publishers & Distributors. p. 121. ISBN 978-81-7435-575-1.
- Fatoohi, Dr Louay. Hanf in Hand on the way to Allah with Tariqa Aliyyah Qadiriyyah Casnazaniyyah. Adam Publishers. p. 24.
- Nadwi, Abdul Hassan Ali (1971). Saviours of Islamic Spirit. Vol. 1. Translated by Ahmad, Mohiuddin. Academy of Islamic Research and publication. pp. 177–202.
- at-Tadifi, Muhammad Yahya (1998). Qalaid al-Jawahir [Necklace of Gems] (PDF). Translated by Holland, Muhtar (2nd ed.). Al-Baz Publishing. ISBN 1-882216-17-2.
