= Fazlul Bari (Indian politician) =

Indian politician and activist

Uttar Pradesh Legislative Assembly, Vidhan Sabha
- In office February 1980 – June 1977
- Preceded by: Triveni Sahai
- Succeeded by: Raghu Raj Prasad Upadhyay
- Constituency: Gonda

Personal details
- Born: 7 August 1936
- Died: 28 October 2011 (aged 75)

Fazlul Bari (7 August 1936 – 28 October 2011, Hindi: फज़लुल बारी), alias Bannay Bhai, was an Indian politician and activist. He was the member of 7th Uttar Pradesh legislative assembly from Gonda Assembly constituency.

== Political career ==
Fazlul Bari was first elected to the Uttar Pradesh Assembly in 1977 as a member of the Janata Party. He played an active role in the movement for the restoration and rebuilding of the Babri Masjid. Additionally, he served as the national president of Majlis Bachao UP. In the early 1980s, during a time when the Muslim community was facing oppression, especially following events like the 1987 Meerut riots and the Eidgah massacre of Muslims in Moradabad in 1980, Fazlul Bari organized a padayatra, a march on foot, from Lucknow to Delhi. This padyatra was a significant demonstration of his commitment to addressing the concerns and grievances of the Muslim community during a period of heightened tension and violence.
