= Mohammad Fazlul Bari =

Ambassador of Bangladesh to Iraq
- In office March 2021 – October 2024

Personal details
- Education: University of Dhaka; Ulster University

Mohammad Fazlul Bari is a Bangladeshi civil servant and the former ambassador of Bangladesh to Iraq.

== Early life ==
Bari has a bachelor's and master's in finance from the University of Dhaka. He has a second masters in financial management from Ulster University in Northern Ireland.

== Career ==
In 1991, Fazlul Bari joined the admin branch of the Bangladesh Civil Service. Fazlul Bari served as the director of Bangladesh Public Administration Training Center. He worked on public financial management at the Ministry of Finance.

Bari was appointed ambassador of Bangladesh to Iraq in March 2021. He visited the shrine of Abdul Qadir Gilani in Bagdad in October 2022. He was terminated after the fall of the Sheikh Hasina led Awami League government.
