= Jacqueline Chabbi =

French historian (born 1943)

Jacqueline Chabbi (born in 1943) is a historian and a professor of Arab Studies at the University of Paris-VIII (Paris Saint-Denis). Her research concerns the history of the medieval Muslim world.

== Biography ==
Jacqueline Chabbi taught at secondary-school level from 1968 to 1973, and from the mid-1970s onwards taught at the Paris 8 University, where she was appointed Professor in 1993, a position she held until her academic retirement in 2011.

She was a visiting scholar at several European universities and is Professor emerita of Arabic Studies. A specialist in History of Islam, her research is distinguished by its anthropological and historical approach to the Quran, which she seeks to situate within its sociocultural context.

She has contributed several entries to the Encyclopædia Universalis, on Sufism, the martyrdom of Al-Hallaj. She also took part in the documentary series Jesus and Islam, broadcast on Arte in December 2015.

In 2016, she was appointed a Knight of the Legion of Honour. In January 2018, the Arab World Institute dedicated an evening in her honour.

== Selected bibliography ==
=== Books ===
- Le Coran des Lumières: L'histoire, les concepts, le divin et le Prophète [The Quran of the Enlightenment: History, Concepts, the Divine, and the Prophet], Paris: Grasset, 2025.
- Dieu de la Bible, Dieu du Coran [God of the Bible, God of the Quran] (with Thomas Römer), Paris: Seuil, 2020, 304 pages, ISBN 9782021421361
- On a perdu Adam. La création dans le Coran [Adam went lost: Creation in the Quran], Paris: Seuil, 2019, 372 pages, ISBN 978-2-021-41684-8
- Les Trois Piliers de l'islam : Lecture anthropologique du Coran [The three pillers of Islam: an anthropological reading of the Quran], Paris: Seuil, 2016, 384 pages, ISBN 2021231011 / Reprint "Points Essais", 2018, ISBN 978-2-757-87247-5
- Le Coran décrypté : Figures bibliques en Arabie [The Quran deciphered: biblical figures in Arabia], preface by André Caquot, 415 pages, Paris: Editions Fayard (2008), ISBN 2213635285. Reprinted by Cerf, "Lexio" series, 2014, ISBN 978-2-204-10322-0
- Le Seigneur des tribus. L'islam de Mahomet [The lord of the tribes: the Islam of Mohammed], 725 pages, Paris: Noesis (Agnes Viénot) (1997), ISBN 2911606132. Reprinted by Editions du CNRS, 734 pages, 2010, ISBN 978-2-271-06711-1
- L'Arabie occidentale au début du septième siècle : Étude des représentations et des mentalités [West Arabia at the beginning of the 7th century: a study of representations and mentalities], Lille: A.N.R.T., 1992
- Maître et disciples dans les traditions religieuses [Master and disciples in religious traditions] (collective work), Paris: Cerf, 1990

=== Articles ===
Chabbi is the author of many articles, including some about Sufism.

- Article Sufism in the Encyclopædia Universalis.
- Article Martyrdom of Al-Hallaj in the Encyclopædia Universalis.
- Notes on the historical development of ascetical and mystical movements in Khursan, Studia Islamica, No. XLVI, 1977, p. 5-72.
- Chabbi, Jacqueline (January 1996). "Histoire et tradition sacrée La biographie impossible de Mahomet". Arabica (in French). T. 43 (Fasc. 1). Brill: 189–205. JSTOR 4057518. "It is impossible, using critical methods, to write a historical biography of Muhammad, as the sources on him are late, contradictory, full of approximations and errors, and theologically and politically biased."
