= Ministry of Digital Economy and Entrepreneurship (Jordan) =

Government ministry of Jordan

Ministry of Digital Economy and Entrepreneurship of Jordan
Department overview
- Jurisdiction: Government of Jordan
- Headquarters: Amman
- Minister responsible: Sami Smeirat, Minister of Digital Economy and Entrepreneurship

The Ministry of Digital Economy and Entrepreneurship of Jordan is the body responsible for setting policies and legislation to regulate the information technology, communications and postal sector, complementing and sustaining the e-government network in Jordan, in addition to supporting initiatives in the field of communications and technology. Previously, the post, telegraph and telephone sector fell under the responsibility of the Ministry of Communications, but due to the development of the communications sector, the Ministry was created. The Jordan Post Company became affiliated with the Ministry; further responsibilities were added to it.

== History ==
Initially established as the Ministry of Communications on 6 August 1939, it was changed to the Ministry of Post and Telecommunications in 1992 and then the Ministry of Communications and Information Technology in 2002. In May 2019, the name of the ministry was changed to: “The Ministry of Digital Economy and Entrepreneurship”, with the aim of supporting the digital transformation process and adopting the concepts of the digital economy, in addition to facilitating and developing the entrepreneurship system in Jordan.
