= Margaret Goodell =

American scientist

Margaret A. Goodell
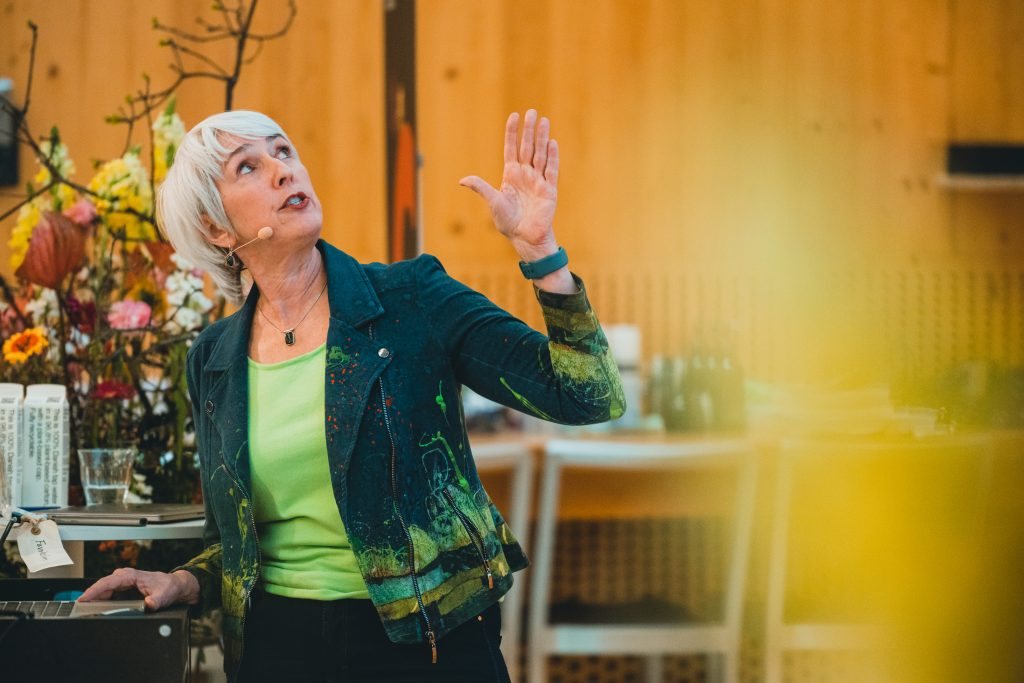
- Education: Wesleyan University; Imperial College of Science and Technology; University of Cambridge
- Known for: Stem cell research
- Children: 3
- Scientific career
- Fields: Stem cells, cancer biology
- Institutions: Baylor College of Medicine; Whitehead Institute
- Website: https://www.goodell-lab.com

Margaret ("Peggy") A. Goodell (born March 23, 1965) is an American scientist working in the field of stem cell research. Dr. Goodell is Chair of the Department of Molecular and Cellular Biology at Baylor College of Medicine, Director of the Stem Cell and Regenerative Medicine (STaR) Center, a member of the National Academy of Medicine and the National Academy of Sciences. She is best known for her contributions to understanding how blood stem cells are regulated.

Goodell has been on the faculty of Baylor College of Medicine since 1997 as a member of the Center for Cell and Gene Therapy, and the Departments of Pediatrics, Molecular and Human Genetics, and Molecular and Cellular Biology. She is the director of the Stem Cells and Regenerative Medicine Center, and is the Chair of the Department of Molecular and Cellular Biology. She holds the Thomas C Thompson Chair in Cell Biology, is the Co-Leader of the Cancer Cell and Gene Therapy program, and the Deputy Director for Basic Science at the Dan L. Duncan Comprehensive Cancer Center. She has received numerous awards for excellence in teaching and research.

Goodell has served as chair of the scientific advisory board of the Keystone Symposia, as a former president of the International Society for Experimental Hematology, and on the board of the International Society for Stem Cell Research. She has also served for the American Society of Hematology, including as the chair of Stem Cells and Regenerative Medicine and as an Associate Editor for Blood, and she serves on the editorial boards of Cell Stem Cell and Cancer Cell.

== Education ==
Goodell began her education at Wesleyan University and moved on to the Imperial College of Science and Technology in London, England, for her final years, where she received her B.Sc. in Biochemistry with Honors in 1986. She went on to earn her Ph.D. at the University of Cambridge in 1991, working at the famous Laboratory of Molecular Biology. She returned to the United States to complete postdoctoral fellowships in Richard Mulligan’s lab at the Whitehead Institute for Biomedical Research at Massachusetts Institute of Technology and Harvard Medical School.

At MIT, she developed a novel method for isolating blood-forming stem cells from mouse bone marrow based on a fortuitous observation that stem cells efflux fluorescent lipophilic dyes. This "side population (SP)" method became widely used to isolate stem cells from a variety of species and adult tissues, including from cancer stem cells.

== Research and career ==
In 1997, Goodell joined the faculty of Baylor College of Medicine in Houston, Texas, in the Departments of Pediatrics and Molecular and Human Genetics. She is a member of the Center for Cell and Gene Therapy and the founder of the Stem Cell and Regenerative Medicine (STaR) Center. She became Chair of the Department of Molecular and Cellular Biology in 2019.

She served as a board member of the International Society for Experimental Hematology from 2009 to 2012. She was elected president of the Society in 2013 and served until 2014. Additionally, she was a board member of the International Society for Stem Cell Research from 2004 to 2007.

Goodell became well known for her development of a novel strategy to isolate stem cells from tissues of adult animals. She observed that a small “side population” of stem cells rapidly pumped out a fluorescent dye (Hoechst 33342), and that flow cytometry could be used to isolate a relatively pure stem cell population. The paper based on this discovery was published in the Journal of Experimental Medicine in 1996 and has been cited nearly 4000 times. This was a breakthrough discovery that has allowed many other scientists to isolate other types of stem cells, and allowed her lab to isolate hematopoietic stem cells (HSCs) with distinct functional characteristics. This led to two new cornerstones of HSC biology: the concepts of HSC heterogeneity and differentiation bias. The strategy has since been applied to many tissues and organisms, including human cancer stem cells and flatworm stem cells.

Goodell’s strategy for HSC purification allowed her lab to study mechanisms that regulate HSC regeneration, quiescence (when the cell is not going through the cell cycle but retains the ability to differentiate), differentiation, and aging. The lab discovered new roles in hematopoiesis of several genes, which led to new knowledge of the role of the immune response in controlling HSC responses. This was an important conceptual advance in the field that has created increased understanding of how the immune system can activate HSCs, especially using interferons. In particular, interferon gamma directly regulates HSC activation and that activation is essential for a successful immune response. This development has created a new field of HSC investigation into the relationships between HSCs, immunity, and inflammation. The paper based on these interferon discoveries was published in Nature in 2010 and has been cited over 1000 times.

She also uncovered how the enzyme de novo DNA methyltransferase, DNMT3A — one of the most important tumor suppressors in the blood — contributes to stem cell self-renewal and differentiation in aging, inflammation, and cancer. The ablation of DNMT3A leads to an increase in HSC self-renewal and a decrease in differentiation. DNMT3A mutations contribute heavily to leukemia development and clonal hematopoiesis, and have come to be understood as the most important tumor suppressor in the hematopoietic system.

These interests led her to a suite of novel CRISPR-mediated techniques to investigate the relationship between DNA methylation and gene expression. The Goodell lab investigates the role of DNMT3A in normal and malignant hematopoiesis, and has discovered a new genome feature termed “methylation canyons.”

More than 400 of her peer-reviewed primary research papers have been published in journals including Nature and Blood. She was an associate editor of Blood from 2013 to 2020. Since 2007, she has been a reviewer and served on the editorial board of Cell Stem Cell, and joined the editorial board of Cancer Cell in 2020. In 2024, she published an opinion piece in The Globe and Mail on early cancer detection.

Her current research is focused on the mechanisms that regulate HSCs, and how those regulatory mechanisms go awry in hematologic malignancies. The Goodell Laboratory, which has about 15 students and post-doctoral fellows, studies the effects of stresses, including infection, toxicity, and age, on the behavior of HSCs. The lab also looks at stem cell growth control, as well as the regulation of self-renewal and activation. Her work has been cited nearly 50,000 times.

== Awards and honors ==
In 2025, Goodell was elected as a member of the National Academy of Sciences (Section 41) and the American Academy of Arts and Sciences. In 2024, Goodell was elected a fellow of the American Association for Cancer Research. In 2023, Goodell received the Donald Metcalf Award from the ISEH, cementing her legacy as a distinguished figure in the field. She gave the Tobias Lecture at the International Society for Stem Cell Research in 2020. Her remarkable achievements continued with her election in 2019 to the National Academy of Medicine. In 2012, she was awarded the Damashek Prize from the American Society of Hematology, the most prestigious award from the Society nominated by the members themselves to recognize research that has changed the understanding of hematology. In 2011, she was recognized with the Edith and Peter O'Donnell Award in Medicine. From 2006 to 2011, she received the American Heart Association’s Established Investigator Award. In 2006, she was honored with the Stohlman Scholar Award from the Leukemia and Lymphoma Society. In 2004 and 2010, she received the DeBakey Award for Excellence in Research. Alongside these accomplishments, she has received numerous accolades for her teaching and mentorship. Throughout her career, she has mentored more than 100 trainees, including doctoral students and post-doctoral fellows, many of whom have gone on to successful careers in academia in addition to mentoring a number of residents, clinical fellows, assistant professors, masters' students, undergraduates, and high school students. She has won several mentorship awards, including in 2026 from the International Society for Experimental Hematology.

== Biography ==
Goodell grew up in Bryan, Ohio, with sisters Marian (a founding member and CEO of the Burning Man Project), Martha (a management consultant), and Melly (a physician). She is the daughter of Joe Goodell, former CEO of American Brass Company, and niece of Grace Goodell, former professor of International Development at The Johns Hopkins School of Advanced International Studies, and of Philip Goodell, a former Professor of Geology at the University of Texas at El Paso.
