= Distamycin =

Names
- IUPAC name N-{5-[(5-{[(3Z)-3-Amino-3-iminopropyl]carbamoyl}-1-methyl-1H-pyrrol-3-yl)carbamoyl]-1-methyl-1H-pyrrol-3-yl}-4-formamido-1-methyl-1H-pyrrole-2-carboxamide
- Other names Distamycin A, Herperetin, Stallimycin

Identifiers
CAS Number	6576-51-8
3D model (JSmol)	Interactive image
ChemSpider	3003
ECHA InfoCard	100.026.823
PubChem CID	24894001
UNII	F6010N240F
- InChI: InChI=1S/C22H27N9O4/c1-29-9-13(26-12-32)6-17(29)21(34)28-15-8-18(31(3)11-15)22(35)27-14-7-16(30(2)10-14)20(33)25-5-4-19(23)24/h6-12H,4-5H2,1-3H3,(H3,23,24)(H,25,33)(H,26,32)(H,27,35)(H,28,34) Key: UPBAOYRENQEPJO-UHFFFAOYSA-N
- SMILES: [H]/N=C(/CCNC(=O)c1cc(cn1C)NC(=O)c2cc(cn2C)NC(=O)c3cc(cn3C)NC=O)\N

Properties
Chemical formula	C_{22}H_{27}N_{9}O_{4}
Molar mass	481.508 g/mol
Appearance	White powder
- Except where otherwise noted, data are given for materials in their standard state (at 25 °C [77 °F], 100 kPa). (what is ?) Infobox references

Distamycin is a polyamide-antibiotic, which acts as a minor groove binder, binding to the small furrow of the double helix.

== Properties ==
Distamycin is a pyrrole-amidine antibiotic and analogous to netropsin and the class of lexitropsins. As opposed to netropsin, distamycin contains three N-methyl-pyrrole units. It is harvested from Streptomyces netropsis that also produces netropsin. Distamycin prefers AT-rich DNA-sequences and tetrades of [TGGGGT]_{4}. Distamycin inhibits the transcription and increases the activity of the topoisomerase II. Derivates from distamycin are used as alkylating antineoplastic agents to combat tumours. Derivates with fluorophores are used as fluorescent tags for double-stranded DNA.

The compound is hygroscopic, and sensible to light, freeze and hydrolysis. Its molar attenuation coefficient is 37,000 M^{−1} cm^{−1} at a wavelength of 303 nm.

== See also ==
- Lexitropsin
- Netropsin
- Hoechst 33258
- DAPI
