= Nancy Berliner =

American hematologist (born 1954)

- Born: March 17, 1954 (age 72)
- Spouse: Alan J. Plattus (m. 1985)
- Parent: Robert Berliner

Academic background
- Education: BSc, Yale University; MD, Yale School of Medicine

Academic work
- Institutions: Yale University; Brigham and Women's Hospital

Nancy Berliner (born on March 17, 1954) is an American hematologist. In January 2020, Berliner was named the editor-in-chief of the journal Blood.

== Early life and education ==
Berliner was born on March 17, 1954, to Robert Berliner, a physician who became dean of the Yale Medical School (1973-1984). She graduated summa cum laude from Yale University and received her medical degree from the Yale School of Medicine. Upon completing medical school, Berliner chose to train in hematology and became the first female chief resident at the Brigham and Women's Hospital.

== Career ==
Berliner finished her residency in 1986 and returned to Yale New Haven Hospital as their interim chief of hematology and as professor of internal medicine and genetics at their School of Medicine. In 2006, Berliner was promoted to Yale's chief of the Hematology Division in the Department of Medicine. While serving in this role, she was elected President of the American Society of Hematology and named a member of the National Academy of Medicine in 2010.

In 2017, Berliner was named the inaugural H. Franklin Bunn, MD, Distinguished Chair in Medicine at Brigham and Women’s Hospital. In January 2020, Berliner was named the editor-in-chief of the journal Blood.

== Personal life ==
Berliner married architect Alan J. Plattus in 1985.
