= Stephanie Lee (scientist) =

American haematologist and physician scientist

Stephanie J. Lee
- Education: Harvard School of Public Health; Stanford University School of Medicine; University of Washington
- Scientific career
- Workplaces: University of Washington; Fred Hutchinson Cancer Research Center
- Website: Lee Lab

Stephanie J. Lee is an American haematologist and physician scientist who is professor and associate director at the Fred Hutchinson Cancer Research Center. Lee works to improve the lives of blood stem cell transplant and bone marrow patients by better understanding the chronic form of graft-versus-host disease. Lee is the former president of the American Society of Hematology.

== Early life and education ==
Lee completed her undergraduate studies at the University of Washington. After graduating, she spent a year as a phlebotomist in a hospital. She pursued a medical degree at the Stanford University School of Medicine, where she completed a residency and internship. Lee earned a Master's in Public Health from the Harvard T.H. Chan School of Public Health, and was board certified in oncology in 1997. She was a medical fellow at the Dana–Farber Cancer Institute, where she was mentored by Jane Weeks and Joseph Antin.

== Research and career ==
In 2006, Lee joined the Fred Hutchinson Cancer Research Center ('the Hutch'). Lee studies bone marrow and stem cell transplantation, and ways to prevent complications during transplants. In particular, she looks to understand and prevent chronic graft-versus-host disease, an autoimmune disorder that occurs after allogeneic hematopoietic stem cell transplantation. It can attack many different organs, and the treatment involves the use of immunosuppressive medications, rendering patients immunocompromised. Lee is the director of the Fred Hutchinson Cancer Research Center Long-Term Follow-Up (LTFU) program, which tracks over 5,000 patients who have undergone bone marrow or stem cell transplants. Lee was named the recipient of the Giuliani/Press Endowed Chair in 2018.

In 2017, Lee was elected vice president of the American Society of Hematology, serving as president from 2020. At the 2020 annual meeting, Lee hosted a discussion with Anthony Fauci, discussing the impact of severe acute respiratory syndrome coronavirus 2 (SARS-CoV-2) on hematologic conditions. During the meeting Lee and Fauci agreed that they would recommend immunocompromised patients get the COVID-19 vaccine.

== Selected publications ==
- Nandita Khera; Eric J Chow; Wendy M Leisenring; Karen L Syrjala; K Scott Baker; Mary E D Flowers; Paul J Martin; Stephanie J Lee (8 December 2010). "Factors associated with adherence to preventive care practices among hematopoietic cell transplantation survivors". Biology of Blood and Marrow Transplantation. 17 (7): 995–1003. doi:10.1016/j.bbmt.2010.10.023. ISSN 1083-8791. PMC 3062948. PMID 21145404. Wikidata Q34711338.
- Eric J. Chow; K Scott Baker; Stephanie J Lee; et al. (2 December 2013). "Influence of conventional cardiovascular risk factors and lifestyle characteristics on cardiovascular disease after hematopoietic cell transplantation". Journal of Clinical Oncology. 32 (3): 191–198. doi:10.1200/jco.2013.52.6582. ISSN 0732-183X. PMC 3887476. PMID 24297944. Wikidata Q37460433.
- Eric J Chow; Kenneth Wong; Stephanie J Lee; et al. (22 February 2014). "Late cardiovascular complications after hematopoietic cell transplantation". Biology of Blood and Marrow Transplantation. 20 (6): 794–800. doi:10.1016/j.bbmt.2014.02.012. ISSN 1083-8791. PMC 4019708. PMID 24565992. Wikidata Q33605306.

== Personal life ==
Lee is married with two children.
