= Dameshek =

Dameshek is a surname. Notable people with the surname include:

- Dave Dameshek (born 1970), American television writer and radio personality
- William Dameshek (1900–1969), American hematologist
