= H. Franklin Bunn =

American physician, hematologist and biochemist

- Born: July 7, 1935 (age 91); Morristown, New Jersey, U.S.
- Education: Harvard and University of Pennsylvania School of Medicine
- Known for: Co-discovery of glycated hemoglobin
- Awards: Fellow of the American Academy of Arts and Sciences
- Scientific career
- Fields: Biochemistry
- Workplaces: Harvard Medical School

Howard Franklin Bunn (born July 7, 1935) is an American physician, hematologist and biochemist at Harvard Medical School, and a Fellow of the American Academy of Arts and Sciences. He is known for his co-discovery of glycated hemoglobin or A1C, a major diagnostic indicator of pre-diabetes and diabetes.

== Early life and education ==
Bunn attended the Pingry School in Elizabeth, New Jersey. He received the AB degree from Harvard in 1957 majoring in chemistry and the MD from the University of Pennsylvania School of Medicine in 1961. After a medical residency at New York Hospital, he completed a fellowship in hematology at the Thorndike Laboratory under mentorship of James Jandl.

== Career ==
Frank Bunn has been a professor of medicine at Harvard Medical School since 1979. From 1976 to 1982 he was Director of the Hematology Division at Brigham and Women's Hospital. From 1977 to 1989 he was an investigator of the Howard Hughes Medical Institute. For nearly 50 years Bunn played a major role in training medical students at Harvard Medical School, and residents and fellows at Brigham and Women's Hospital. From 1991 until 1998, he directed the Harvard-Markey Program in Biomedical Sciences, which provides graduate students an added year of training in human biology and disease pathophysiology.

The first 20 years of Bunn's research focused on hemoglobin. His major work included

- demonstrating that free hemoglobin in the circulating plasma is excreted by the kidney, owing to the dissociation of the a2b2 tetramer into ab dimers,
- discovery of the hemoglobin binding site of the physiologically important modifier 2,3 bisphosphoglycerate,
- demonstrating that surface charge determines the proportion of commonly encountered mutant hemoglobins in heterozygotes,
- discovery of the first example of a hemoglobin frame shift mutation,
- establishing sequence dependent rules for cleavage of the initiator methionine and N-acetylation,
- demonstrating with Gallop that the minor hemoglobin component HbA1c contains glucose attached to the N-terminus of the beta globin chain by a ketoamine linkage,
- providing the rationale for measurement of HbA1c as an index of long-term control in diabetics, with later work indicating that this glucose-dependent modification likely contributes to long-term complications of diabetes.

The second 20 years of Bunn's research focused on identification of domains on erythropoietin (EPO) that bind to its receptor, and on characterizing the oxygen-dependent degradation domain of the HIFa transcription factor responsible for hypoxic induction of EPO and other physiologically relevant proteins.

== Awards ==
- 1997: "Letter in Life" Award from the Pingry School, 1997
- 1999: Elected Fellow of the American Academy of Arts and Sciences
- 2000: Stratton Medal from the American Society of Hematology
- 2009: Distinguished Graduate Alumni Scholar Award from the University of Pennsylvania School of Medicine
- 2009: Wallace H. Coulter Lifetime Achievement Award from the American Society of Hematology
- 2013: First recipient of Special Faculty Prize from Harvard Medical School for Sustained Excellence in Teaching
- 2024: Antonio Feltrinelli Prize for Medicine - Accademia Nazionale dei Lincei, Italy

== Personal ==
Bunn has been married to Elizabeth Godard for over 50 years. They have three sons, George, Emory, and Andrew, and five grandsons.
