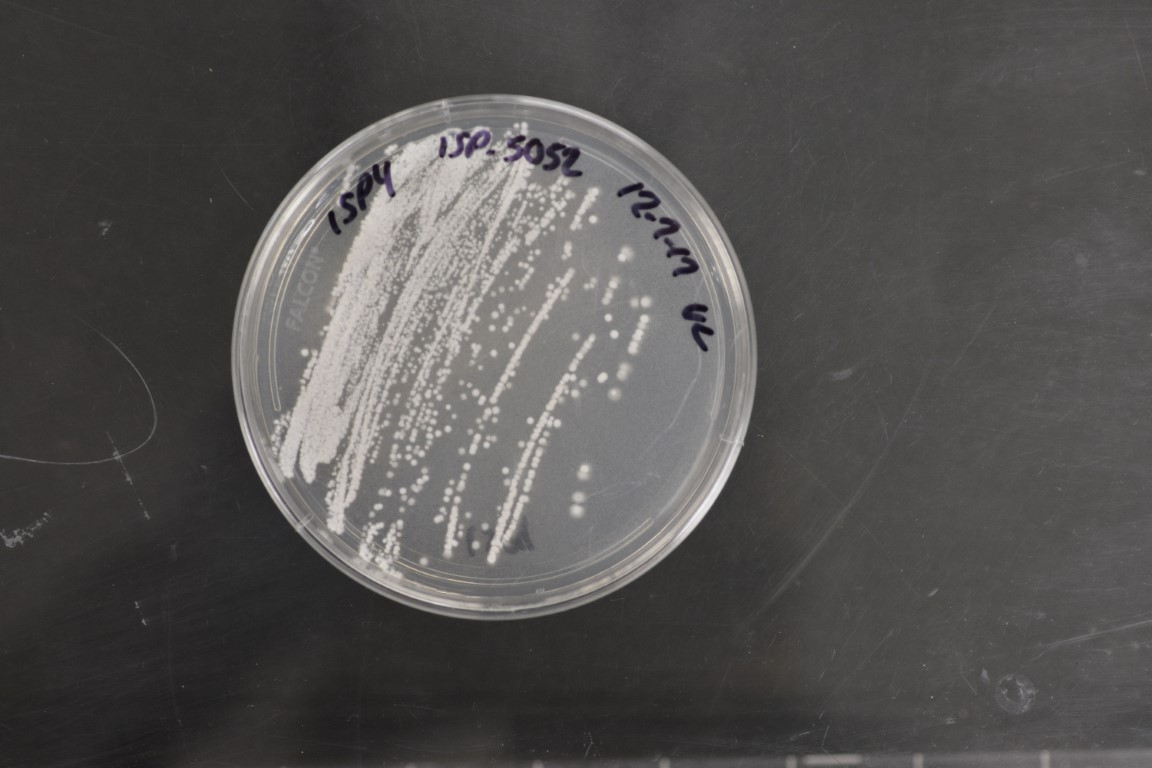

Scientific classification
- Domain: Bacteria
- Kingdom: Bacillati
- Phylum: Actinomycetota
- Class: Actinomycetes
- Order: Streptomycetales
- Family: Streptomycetaceae
- Genus: Streptomyces
- Species: S. netropsis

Binomial name
- Streptomyces netropsis Witt and Stackebrandt 1991

Type strain
- 2937-6, ATCC 23940, BCRC 13374, CBS 924.68, CCRC 13374, CECT 3265, CEST 3265, Chas. Pfizer & Co. 2937-6(4779), Chas. Pfizer & Co.2937(4779), Chas. Pfizer Co. 2937, CIP 108153, DSM 40259, DSMZ 40259, ETH 15974, ETH 24229, FD 4779, HUT-6086, IFM 1035, IFO 12893, IFO 3723, IPV 1720, IPV 880, IPV 889, ISP 5259, JCM 4063, JCM 4655, KCC S-0063, KCC S-0655, KCCS-0063, KCCS-0655, KCTC 9873, LMG 5979, NBRC 12893, NBRC 3723, NCB 266, NCIB 9592, NCIB 9855, NCIMB 9592, NCIMB 9855, NRRL 2268, NRRL B, NRRL B-2268, NRRL-ISP 5259, PCM 2251, PSA 80, RIA 1184, RIA 605, Routien 4779, VKM Ac-820

Synonyms
- Streptomyces colombiensis Pridham et al. 1958 (Approved Lists 1980); Streptomyces distallicus (Locci et al. 1969) Witt and Stackebrandt 1991; "Streptomyces flavopersicus" Oliver et al. 1961; Streptomyces flavopersicus (Oliver et al. 1961) Witt and Stackebrandt 1991; "Streptomyces kentuckensis" Barr and Carman 1956; Streptomyces kentuckensis (Barr and Carman 1956) Witt and Stackebrandt 1991; "Streptomyces netropsis" Finlay et al. 1951; Streptomyces syringium (Konev 1986) Witt and Stackebrandt 1991; Streptoverticillium distallicum Locci et al. 1969 (Approved Lists 1980); Streptoverticillium flavopersicum (Oliver et al. 1961) Locci et al. 1969 (Approved Lists 1980); Streptoverticillium kentuckense (Barr and Carman 1956) Baldacci et al. 1966 (Approved Lists 1980); Streptoverticillium netropsis (Finlay et al. 1951) Baldacci et al. 1966 (Approved Lists 1980); Streptoverticillium syringium (ex Konev et al. 1974) Konev 1986; "Verticillomyces kentuckensis" (Barr and Carman 1956) Shinobu 1965; "Verticillomyces netropsis" (Finlay et al. 1951) Shinobu 1965

= Streptomyces netropsis =

Species of bacterium

Streptomyces netropsis is a bacterium species from the genus of Streptomyces. Streptomyces netropsis produces the antibiotics netropsin and distamycin A and the antifungal polyene mycoheptin.

== See also ==
- List of Streptomyces species
