= Blood (journal) =

Academic journal

- Cover of Volume 135, Issue 9
- Discipline: Hematology
- Language: English
- Edited by: Nancy Berliner

Publication details
- History: 1946–present
- Publisher: American Society of Hematology (United States)
- Frequency: Weekly
- Open access: Delayed, after 12 months
- Impact factor: 21.1 (2023)

Standard abbreviations
- ISO 4: Blood

Indexing
- CODEN: BLOOAW
- ISSN: 0006-4971 (print); 1528-0020 (web)
- LCCN: a50001900
- OCLC no.: 01536582

Links
- Journal homepage; Current issue; Online archives

Blood is a peer-reviewed medical journal published by the American Society of Hematology. It was established by William Dameshek in 1946. The journal changed from semimonthly (24 times annually) to weekly publication at the start of 2009. It covers clinical and basic research in all areas of hematology, including disorders of leukocytes, both benign and malignant, erythrocytes, platelets, hemostatic mechanisms, vascular biology, immunology, and hematologic oncology.

== Abstracting and indexing ==
Blood is indexed and abstracted by:

- BIOSIS
- Current Contents/Life Sciences
- Current Contents/Clinical Medicine
- Excerpta Medica
- Index Medicus
- Science Citation Index
- SciSearch

According to the Journal Citation Reports, the journal has a 2023 impact factor of 21.1, and has a Journal Impact Factor rank of 2/97 in the Hematology category.
