= Lexitropsin =

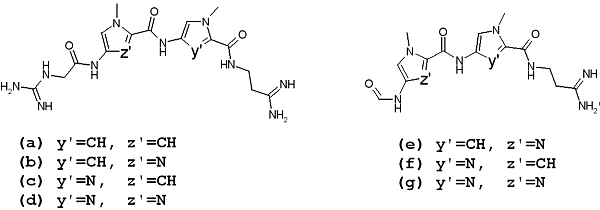
Structures of semi-synthetic lexitropsin analogues

Lexitropsins are members of a family of semi-synthetic DNA-binding ligands. They are structural analogs of the natural antibiotics netropsin and distamycin. Antibiotics of this group can bind in the minor groove of DNA with different sequence-selectivity. Lexitropsins form a complexes with DNA with stoichiometry 1:1 and 2:1. Based on the 2:1 complexes were obtained ligands with high sequence-selectivity. This property is due to their selectivity towards AT-rich regions.

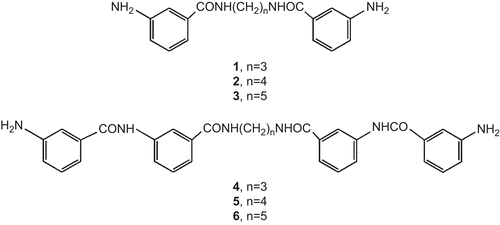
Synthetic carbocyclic analogues synthesised by Drozdowska et al.

Recently, carbocyclic derivatives based on pentamidine were shown to exhibit in vivo antiproliferative effects on human breast cancer cells, possibly because of their ability to inhibit topoisomerase activity.

== See also ==
- Hoechst 33258
- Pentamidine
- DNA binding ligand
- Single-strand binding protein
- Comparison of nucleic acid simulation software
