= Side population =

A side population (SP) in flow cytometry is a sub-population of cells that is distinct from the main population on the basis of the markers employed. By definition, cells in a side population have distinguishing biological characteristics (for example, they may exhibit stem cell-like characteristics), but the exact nature of this distinction depends on the markers used in identifying the side population.

== Examples ==
Side populations were first identified in hematopoietic stem cells by Dr. Margaret Goodell. SPs have been identified in hepatocellular carcinomas and may be the cells that efflux chemotherapy drugs, accounting for the resistance of cancer to chemotherapy.

Recent studies on testicular stem cells indicate that more than 40% of the SP (defined in this case as cells that show higher efflux of DNA-binding dye Hoechst 33342) was undifferentiated spermatogonia, while other differentiated fractions were represented by only 0.2%. SP cells can rapidly efflux lipophilic fluorescent dyes to produce a characteristic profile based on fluorescence-activated flow cytometric analysis. Previous studies have demonstrated SP cells in bone marrow obtained from patients with acute myeloid leukemia, suggesting that these cells might be candidate leukemic stem cells, and recent studies have found a SP of tumor progenitor cells in human solid tumors. These new data indicate that the ability of malignant SP cells to expel anticancer drugs may directly improve their survival and sustain their clonogenicity during exposure to cytostatic drugs, allowing disease recurrence when therapy is withdrawn. Identification of a tumor progenitor population with intrinsic mechanisms for cytostatic drug resistance might also provide clues for improved therapeutic intervention. The molecules involved in effluxing Hoechst 33342 are members of the ATP-binding cassette family, such as MDR1 (P-glycoprotein) and ABCG2.
