= Bisbenzimide =

Names
- Preferred IUPAC name 2′-(4-Ethoxyphenyl)-6-(4-methylpiperazin-1-yl)-1H,3′H-2,5′-bi-1,3-benzimidazole
- Other names Hoechst 33342; Hoe 33342

Identifiers
CAS Number	23491-52-3; 23491-45-4 (trihydrochloride)
3D model (JSmol)	Interactive image
ChemSpider	1420
ECHA InfoCard	100.041.523
PubChem CID	1464
UNII	99KZS6CNZX; MHT095273M (trihydrochloride)
CompTox Dashboard (EPA)	DTXSID80178059
- InChI: InChI=1S/C27H28N6O/c1-3-34-21-8-4-18(5-9-21)26-28-22-10-6-19(16-24(22)30-26)27-29-23-11-7-20(17-25(23)31-27)33-14-12-32(2)13-15-33/h4-11,16-17H,3,12-15H2,1-2H3,(H,28,30)(H,29,31) Key: PRDFBSVERLRRMY-UHFFFAOYSA-N; InChI=1/C27H28N6O/c1-3-34-21-8-4-18(5-9-21)26-28-22-10-6-19(16-24(22)30-26)27-29-23-11-7-20(17-25(23)31-27)33-14-12-32(2)13-15-33/h4-11,16-17H,3,12-15H2,1-2H3,(H,28,30)(H,29,31) Key: PRDFBSVERLRRMY-UHFFFAOYAR
- SMILES: CCOc1ccc(cc1)c2[nH]c3cc(ccc3n2)c4[nH]c5cc(ccc5n4)N6CCN(CC6)C

Properties
Chemical formula	C_{27}H_{28}N_{6}O
Molar mass	452.562 g·mol^{−1}
- Except where otherwise noted, data are given for materials in their standard state (at 25 °C [77 °F], 100 kPa). Infobox references

Bisbenzimide (Hoechst 33342) is an organic compound used as a fluorescent stain for DNA in molecular biology applications. Several related chemical compounds are used for similar purposes and are collectively called Hoechst stains.

== Application ==
Bisbenzimide tends to bind to adenine–thymine-rich regions of DNA and can decrease its density. Bisbenzimide mixed with DNA samples can then be used to separate DNA according to their AT percentage using a cesium chloride (CsCl) gradient centrifugation.

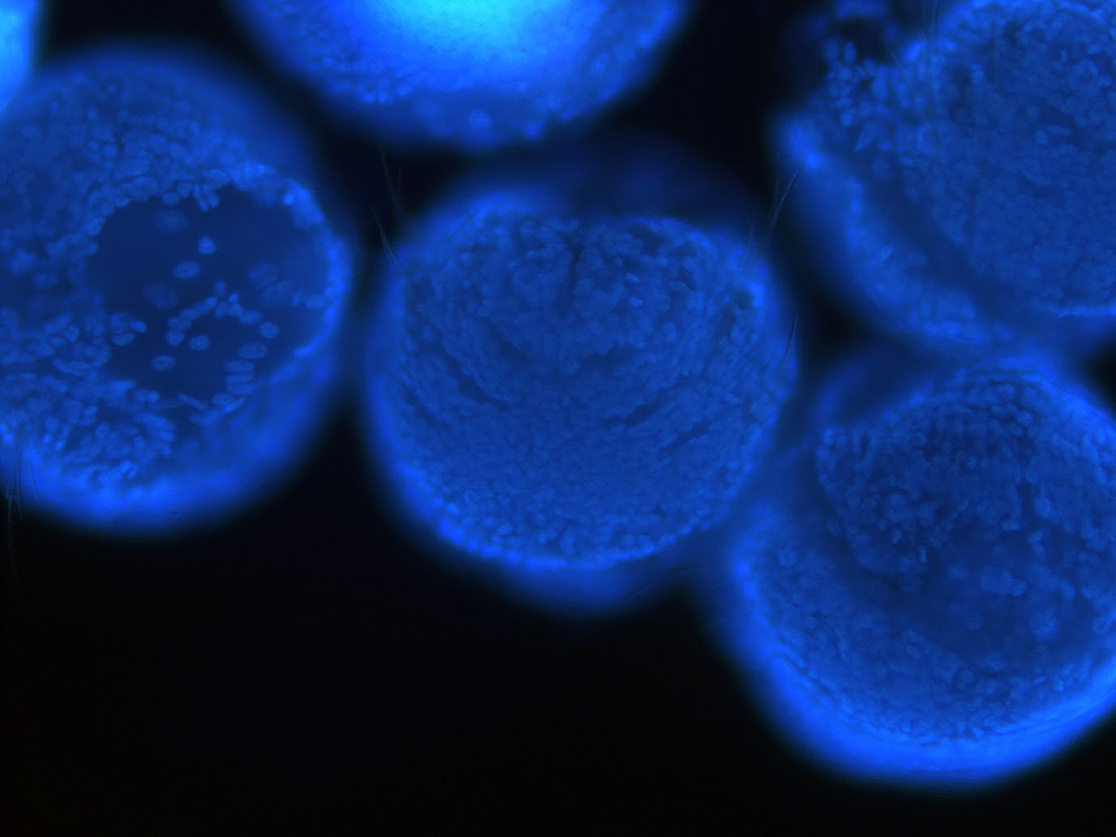
Nuclei of Platynereis dumerilii larvae stained with Hoechst 33342
