= William Dameshek =

American hematologist (1900–1969)

William Dameshek (1900 in Voronezh – 1969) was an American hematologist. He graduated from Harvard College and Harvard Medical School and spent the early part of his career at Beth Israel Hospital (now Beth Israel Deaconess Medical Center). He was the founder of Blood, the prime core clinical journal of hematology, in 1946. He is also credited with describing the concept of myeloproliferative diseases in 1951. In addition, he participated in the first studies of nitrogen mustard in various hematological malignancies, widely considered the first uses of chemotherapy in malignant diseases. Dr Dameshek was also the first one who described chronic lymphocytic leukemia (CLL), a common form of leukemia in adults.

Dr. Dameshek served as president of the American Society of Hematology (ASH) in 1964. He made numerous contributions to ASH as well as the field of hematology and was the first editor of its journal Blood. Given Dr. Dameshek's accomplishments, ASH has named the Dameshek Prize in his honor. Each year the Dameshek Prize is awarded to an individual who has made an outstanding contribution in hematology.
