= Netropsin =

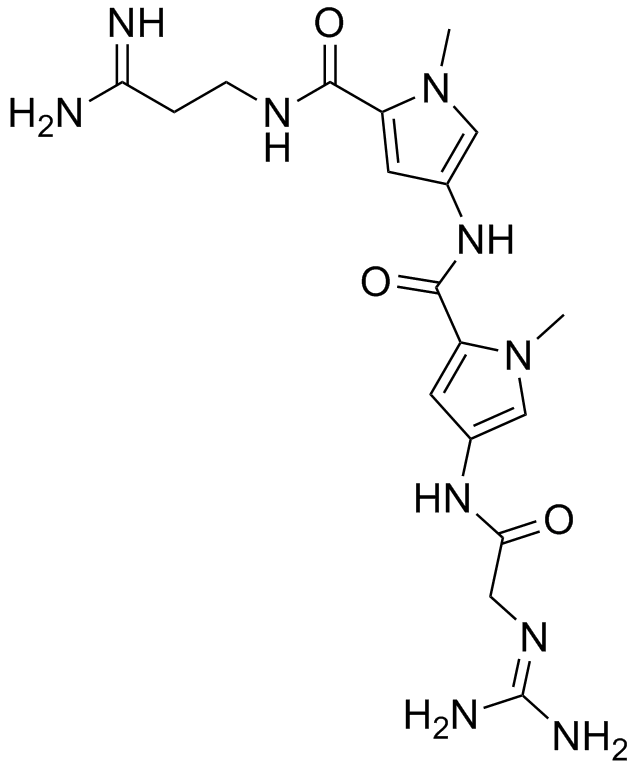

Names
- IUPAC name N-{5-[(3-Amino-3-iminopropyl)carbamoyl]-1-methyl-1H-pyrrol-3-yl}-4-[(N-carbamimidoylglycyl)amino]-1-methyl-1H-pyrrole-2-carboxamide
- Other names Nt, congocidin, sinanomycin

Identifiers
| CAS Number | 1438-30-8 |
| 3D model (JSmol) | Interactive image |
| ChEMBL | ChEMBL553984 |
| ChemSpider | 4306 |
| ECHA InfoCard | 100.162.288 |
| PubChem CID | 4461 |
| UNII | 64B3O0RD7N |
| CompTox Dashboard (EPA) | DTXSID00879834 |
- InChI: InChI=1S/C18H26N10O3/c1-27-9-11(6-12(27)16(30)23-4-3-14(19)20)26-17(31)13-5-10(8-28(13)2)25-15(29)7-24-18(21)22/h5-6,8-9H,3-4,7H2,1-2H3,(H3,19,20)(H,23,30)(H,25,29)(H,26,31)(H4,21,22,24) Key: IDBIFFKSXLYUOT-UHFFFAOYSA-N; InChI=1/C18H26N10O3/c1-27-9-11(6-12(27)16(30)23-4-3-14(19)20)26-17(31)13-5-10(8-28(13)2)25-15(29)7-24-18(21)22/h5-6,8-9H,3-4,7H2,1-2H3,(H3,19,20)(H,23,30)(H,25,29)(H,26,31)(H4,21,22,24) Key: IDBIFFKSXLYUOT-UHFFFAOYAW
- SMILES: [H]/N=C(/CCNC(=O)c1cc(cn1C)NC(=O)c2cc(cn2C)NC(=O)CN=C(N)N)\N

Properties
| Chemical formula | C_{18}H_{26}N_{10}O_{3} · 2HCl |
| Molar mass | 503.39 g/mol |
| Appearance | White powder |
- Except where otherwise noted, data are given for materials in their standard state (at 25 °C [77 °F], 100 kPa). verify (what is ?) Infobox references

Netropsin (also known as congocidine or sinanomycin) is a polyamide with antibiotic and antiviral activity. Netropsin was discovered by Finlay et al., and was first isolated from the actinobacterium Streptomyces netropsis. It belongs to the class of pyrrole-amidine antibiotics.

== DNA binding properties ==
Netropsin binds to the minor groove of AT-rich sequences of double stranded DNA. In contrast, netropsin does not bind single stranded DNA or double stranded RNA. Crystallographic structures of DNA-bound Netropsin have been obtained and elucidate details of how the drug binds in the minor groove. In the bound structure, the drug makes hydrogen bonding interactions with four subsequent base pairs of the DNA duplex, locally displacing the water molecules of the spine of hydration.

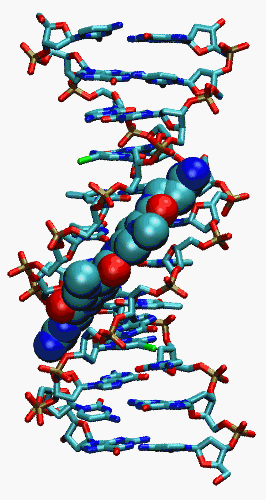
Netropsin (shown in space-filling representation) bound to DNA (shown as bonds)

Using gel mobility and analytical ultracentrifugation, it was shown that Netropsin binding to DNA increases the twist per base by similar to 9˚ per molecule bound. Thus, it removes supercoils when interacting with positively supercoiled DNA and introduces (additional) negative supercoils when binding to relaxed or negatively supercoiled DNA. Netropsin's effect on supercoiled DNA was observed in detail on single molecules using a magnetic tweezers.

== Antibiotic properties ==
It has been shown that Netropsin is active both against Gram-positive bacteria and Gram-negative bacteria.

== See also ==
- Lexitropsin
- Hoechst 33258
- DAPI
- Pentamidine
- DNA-binding protein
- Single-strand binding protein
- Comparison of nucleic acid simulation software
