= Pentamidine =

Medical antimicrobial drug

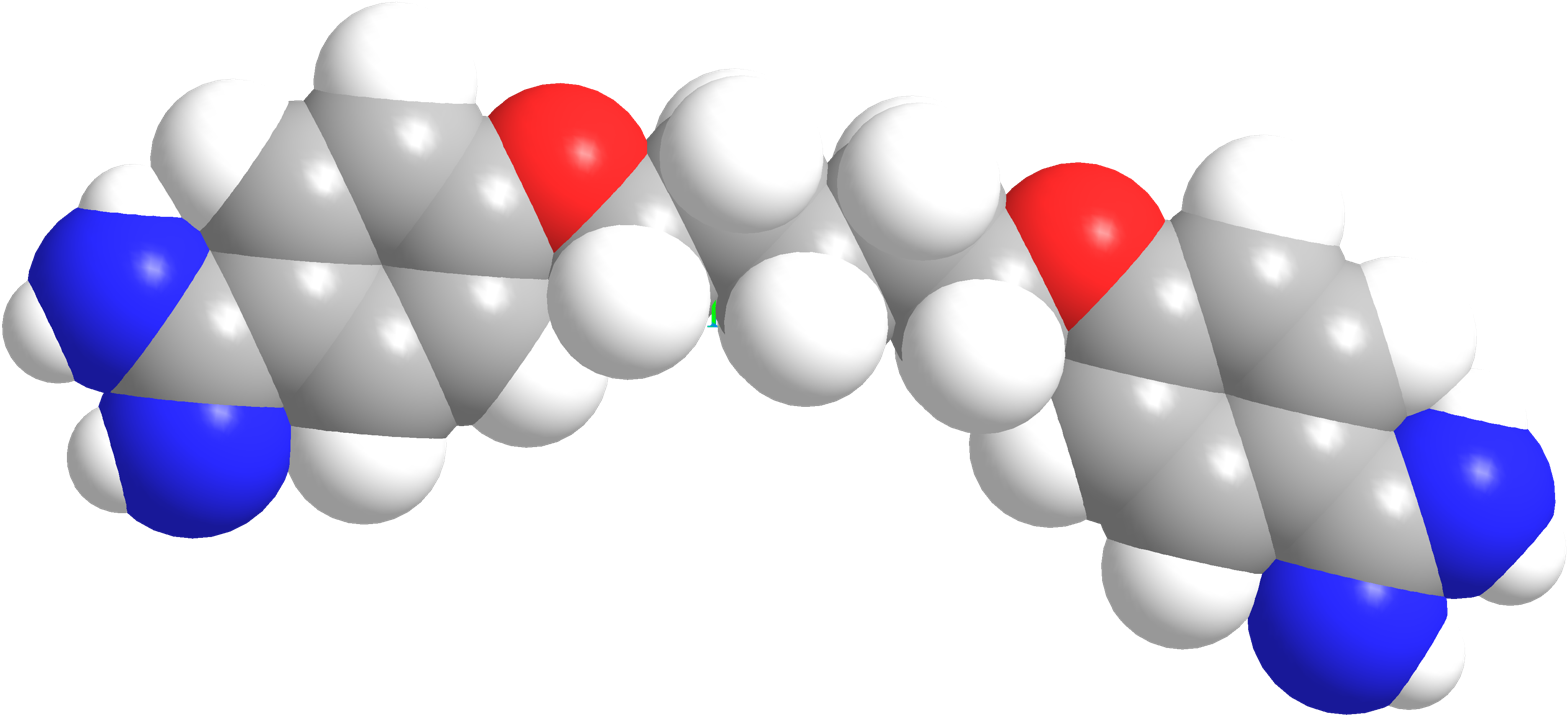

Clinical data
- Trade names: Nebupent, Pentam, others
- Other names: pentamidine diisethionate, pentamidine dimesilate
- AHFS/Drugs.com: Monograph
- Routes of administration: IV, IM, inhalation
- ATC code: P01CX01 (WHO) QP51DF02 (WHO)

Legal status
- Legal status: In general: ℞ (Prescription only)

Pharmacokinetic data
- Protein binding: 69%
- Elimination half-life: 6.4-9.4 hours

Identifiers
- IUPAC name: 4,4'-[pentane-1,5-diylbis(oxy)]dibenzenecarboximidamide
- CAS Number: 100-33-4
- PubChem CID: 4735
- DrugBank: DB00738
- ChemSpider: 4573
- UNII: 673LC5J4LQ
- KEGG: D08333
- ChEBI: CHEBI:45081
- ChEMBL: ChEMBL55
- CompTox Dashboard (EPA): DTXSID7023431
- ECHA InfoCard: 100.002.583

Chemical and physical data
- Formula: C_{19}H_{24}N_{4}O_{2}
- Molar mass: 340.427 g·mol^{−1}
- 3D model (JSmol): Interactive image
- Melting point: 186 °C (367 °F) (dec.)
- SMILES: O(c1ccc(cc1)C(=[N@H])N)CCCCCOc2ccc(C(=[N@H])N)cc2
- InChI: InChI=1S/C19H24N4O2/c20-18(21)14-4-8-16(9-5-14)24-12-2-1-3-13-25-17-10-6-15(7-11-17)19(22)23/h4-11H,1-3,12-13H2,(H3,20,21)(H3,22,23); Key:XDRYMKDFEDOLFX-UHFFFAOYSA-N

Pentamidine is an antimicrobial medication used to treat African trypanosomiasis, leishmaniasis, Balamuthia infections, babesiosis, and to prevent and treat pneumocystis pneumonia (PCP) in people with poor immune function. In African trypanosomiasis it is used for early disease before central nervous system involvement, as a second line option to suramin. It is an option for both visceral leishmaniasis and cutaneous leishmaniasis. Pentamidine can be given by injection into a vein or muscle or by inhalation.

Common side effects of the injectable form include low blood sugar, pain at the site of injection, nausea, vomiting, low blood pressure, and kidney problems. Common side effects of the inhaled form include wheezing, cough, and nausea. It is unclear if doses should be changed in those with kidney or liver problems. Pentamidine is not recommended in early pregnancy but may be used in later pregnancy. Its safety during breastfeeding is unclear. Pentamidine is in the aromatic diamidine family of medications. While the way the medication works is not entirely clear, it is believed to involve decreasing the production of DNA, RNA, and protein.

Pentamidine came into medical use in 1937. It is on the World Health Organization's List of Essential Medicines. It is available as a generic medication. In regions of the world where trypanosomiasis is common pentamidine is provided for free by the World Health Organization (WHO).

== Medical uses ==
- Treatment of PCP caused by Pneumocystis jirovecii
- Prevention of PCP in adults with HIV who have one or both of the following:
  - History of PCP
  - CD4+ count ≤ 200mm³
- Treatment of leishmaniasis
- Treatment of African trypanosomiasis caused by Trypanosoma brucei gambiense
- Balamuthia infections
- Pentamidine is classified as an orphan drug by the U.S. Food and Drug Administration

=== Other uses ===
- Use as an antitumor drug has also been proposed.
- Pentamidine is also identified as a potential small molecule antagonist that disrupts this interaction between S100P and RAGE receptor.

=== Special populations ===
==== Pregnancy ====
It has not been shown to cause birth defects in animal studies when given intravenously. There are no controlled studies to show if pentamidine can harm the fetus in pregnant women. It is only recommended if the drug of choice trimethoprim-sulfamethoxazole is contraindicated.

==== Breastfeeding ====
There is no information regarding the excretion of pentamidine in breast milk, but since the adverse effects on breastfed infants are unknown currently, it is recommended by the manufacturer for the infant to not be breastfed or for the mother to stop the drug. Risks versus benefits for the mother should be considered when making this decision.

==== Children ====
Pentamidine can be used in the prevention of PCP in children with HIV who cannot tolerate Trimethoprim/Sulfamethoxazole and can use a nebulizer. Intranvenous solutions of pentamidine should only be used in children with HIV older than 2 years old when other treatments are unavailable

==== Elderly ====
There is no data for the use of pentamidine in this specific population.

== Contraindications ==
- Patients with a history of anaphylaxis or hypersensitivity to pentamidine isethionate

== Side effects ==
=== Common ===
- Burning pain, dryness, or sensation of lump in throat
- Chest pain
- Coughing
- difficulty in breathing
- difficulty in swallowing
- skin rash
- wheezing

=== Rare ===
- Nausea and vomiting
- Pain in upper abdomen, possibly radiating to the back
- Severe pain in side of chest
- Shortness of breath

=== Others ===
- Blood: Pentamidine frequently causes leukopenia and less often thrombopenia, which may cause symptomatic bleeding. Some cases of anemia, possibly related to folic acid deficiency, have been described.
- Cardiovascular: Hypotension, which may be severe. Severe or fatal arrhythmias and heart failure are quite frequent.
- Kidney: 25 percent develop signs of nephrotoxicity ranging from mild, asymptomatic azotemia (increased serum creatinine and urea) to irreversible renal failure. Ample fluids or intravenous hydration may prevent some nephrotoxicity.
- Liver: Elevated liver enzymes are associated with intravenous use of pentamidine. Hepatomegaly and hepatitis have been encountered with long term prophylactic use of pentamidine inhalation.
- Neurological: Dizziness, drowsiness, neuralgia, confusion, hallucinations, seizures and other central side effects are reported.
- Pancreas: Hypoglycemia that requires symptomatic treatment is frequently seen. On the other hand, pentamidine may cause or worsen diabetes mellitus.
- Respiratory: Cough and bronchospasm, most frequently seen with inhalation.
- Skin: Severe local reactions after extravasculation of intravenous solutions or following intramuscular injection treatment have been seen. Pentamidine itself may cause rash, or rarely Stevens–Johnson syndrome or Lyell syndrome.
- Eye discomfort, conjunctivitis, throat irritation, splenomegaly, Herxheimer reaction, electrolyte imbalances (e.g. hypocalcemia).

== Drug interactions ==
The additional or sequential use of other nephrotoxic drugs like aminoglycosides, amphotericin B, capreomycin, colistin, polymyxin B, vancomycin, foscarnet, or cisplatin should be closely monitored, or whenever possible completely avoided.

== Mechanism of action ==
The mechanism seems to vary with different organisms and is not well understood. However, pentamidine is suspected to work through various methods of interference of critical functions in DNA, RNA, phospholipid and protein synthesis. Pentamidine binds to adenine-thymine-rich regions of the Trypanosoma parasite DNA, forming a cross-link between two adenines four to five base pairs apart. The drug also inhibits topoisomerase enzymes in the mitochondria of Pneumocystis jirovecii. Similarly, pentamidine inhibits type II topoisomerase in the mitochondria of the Trypanosoma parasite, resulting in a broken and unreadable mitochondrial genome.

=== Resistance ===
Strains of the Trypanosoma brucei parasite that are resistant to pentamidine have been discovered. Pentamidine is brought into the mitochondria through carrier proteins, and the absence of these carriers prevents the drug from reaching its site of action.

== Pharmacokinetics ==
=== Absorption ===
Pentamidine is completely absorbed when given intravenously or intramuscularly. When inhaled through a nebulizer, pentamidine accumulates in the bronchoalveolar fluid of the lungs at a higher concentration compared to injections. The inhaled form is minimally absorbed in the blood, but the effects of chronic inhaled administration on these levels are not known. Absorption is unreliable when given orally.

=== Distribution ===
When injected, pentamidine binds to tissues and proteins in the plasma. It accumulates in the kidney, liver, lungs, pancreas, spleen, and adrenal glands. Additionally, pentamidine does not reach curative levels in the cerebrospinal fluid. It has a volume of distribution of 286–1356 liters when given intravenously and 1658–3790 liters when given intramuscularly. Inhaled pentamidine is mainly recovered from the bronchoalveolar lavage fluid of the lungs.

=== Metabolism ===
Pentamidine is primarily metabolized by cytochrome P450 enzymes in the liver. Up to 12% of pentamidine is eliminated in the urine unchanged.

=== Elimination ===
Pentamidine has an average half-life of five to eight hours when given intravenously and seven to eleven hours when given intramuscularly. However, these may increase with severe kidney problems. Pentamidine can remain in the system for as long as eight months after the first injection.

== Chemistry ==
Pentamidine isethionate for injection is commercially available as a lyophilized, white crystalline powder for reconstitution with sterile water or 5% dextrose. After reconstitution, the mixture should be free from discoloration and precipitation. Reconstitution with sodium chloride should be avoided due to formation of precipitates. Intravenous solutions of pentamidine can be mixed with intravenous HIV medications like zidovidine and intravenous heart medications like diltiazem. However, intravenous solutions of antiviral foscarnet and antifungal fluconazole are incompatible with pentamidine. To avoid side-effects associated with intravenous administration, the solution should be slowly infused to minimize the release of histamine.

== History ==
Pentamidine was first used to treat African trypanosomiasis in 1937 and leishmaniasis in 1940 before it was registered as pentamidine mesylate in 1950.

The sudden increase in requests for use of pentamidine isethionate in then unlicensed form from the CDC in the early 1980s for treating Pneumocystis jirovecii in young male patients was key in identifying the emergence of the HIV/AIDS epidemic at that time.

Its efficacy against Pneumocystis jirovecii was demonstrated in 1987, following its re-emergence on the drug market in 1984 in the current isethionate form.

== Trade names and dose form ==
For oral inhalation and for nebulizer use:

- NebuPent Nebulizer (APP Pharmaceuticals LLC - US)

For intravenous and intramuscular use:

- US and Canada:
  - Pentacarinat 300 injection powder 300 mg vial (Avantis Pharma Inc - Canada)
  - Pentam 300 (APP Pharmaceuticals LLC - US)
  - Pentamidine isethionate 300 mg for injection (David Bull Laboratories LTD - Canada, Hospira Healthcare Corporation - Canada)
- International Brands:
  - Pentamidine isethionate (Abbott)
  - Pentacarinat (Sanofi-Aventis)
  - Pentacrinat (Abbott)
  - Pentam (Abbott)
  - Pneumopent

== See also ==
- Netropsin
- Lexitropsin
