= American Society of Hematology =

Organization

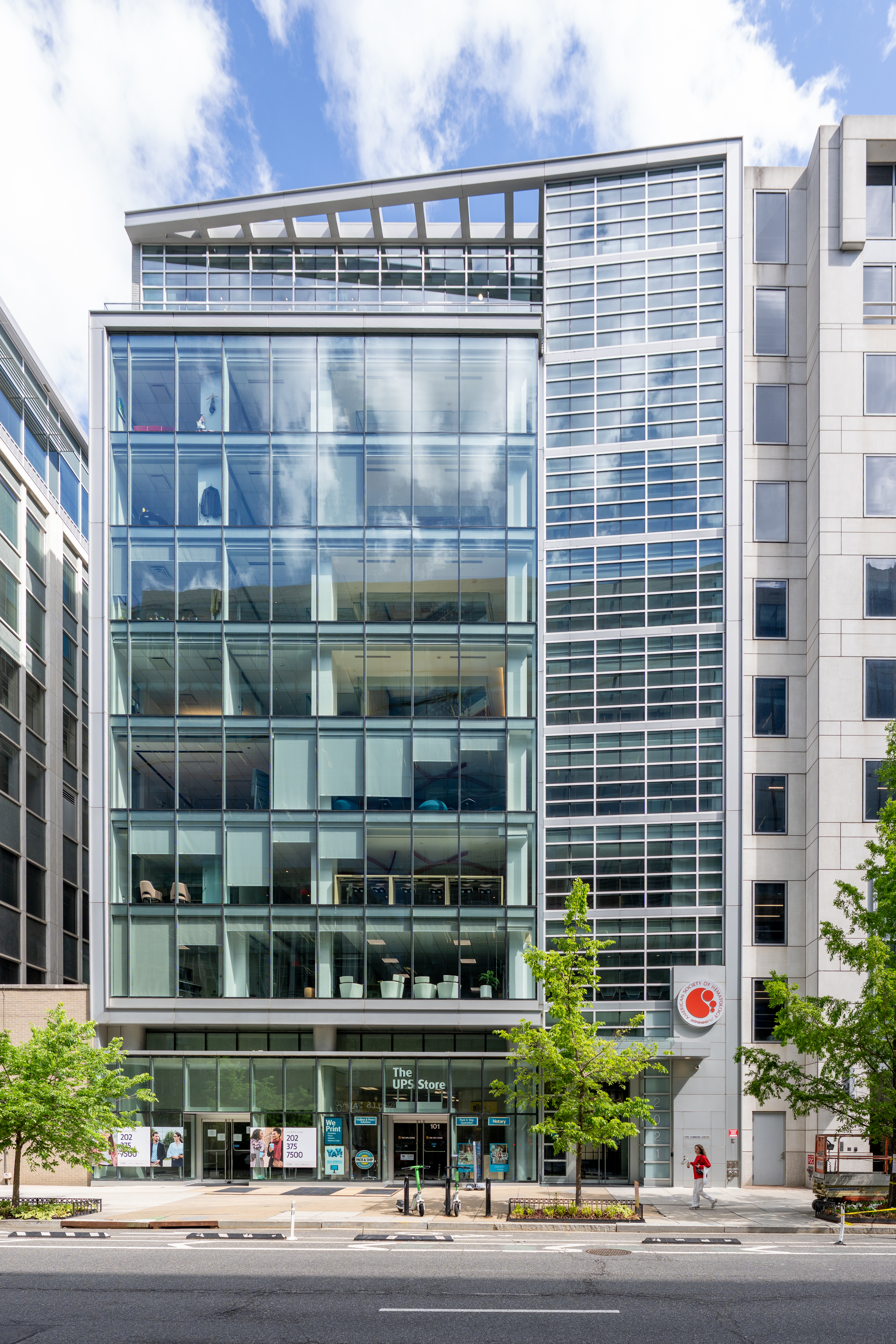
- Headquarters in Washington, D.C.
- Abbreviation: ASH
- Formation: 1958
- Headquarters: 2021 L Street NW, Suite 900, Washington, D.C. 20036
- Members: 17,000
- Official language: English
- Staff: 110-120
- Website: hematology.org

The American Society of Hematology (ASH) is a professional organization representing hematologists, founded in 1958. Its annual meeting is held in December of every year and has attracted more than 30,000 attendees. The society publishes the medical journal Blood, the most cited peer-reviewed publication in the field, and Blood Advances, an online, peer-reviewed open-access journal.

The first official ASH meeting was held in Atlantic City, New Jersey, in April 1958. More than 300 hematologists met to discuss the key research and clinical issues related to blood and blood diseases. Since the first gathering, ASH has been an important member in the development of hematology as a discipline. For more than six decades, ASH has sponsored its annual meeting. Today, ASH has more than 17,000 members, many of whom have made major advancements in understanding and treating blood diseases.

== Annual meeting ==
Held each year in December, the annual meeting brings together hematologists from around the world to discuss hematology. During the four-day meeting, several educational programs and scientific sessions are held. The annual meeting also features oral and poster presentations that are chosen by peer-reviewers from abstracts submitted prior to the meeting and contain developments in scientific research. Plenary symposia and named lectures on specialized areas of hematology are also presented throughout the meeting program. More than 21,000 clinicians, scientists, and others attend.

== Partnerships ==
ASH receives financial support from, and collaborates with, a number of pharmaceutical companies. Notable corporate partners include AbbVie, Amgen, AstraZeneca, Bayer, Bristol Myers Squibb, Eli Lilly and Company, Genentech, GlaxoSmithKline, Janssen Pharmaceuticals, Merck, Novo Nordisk, Pfizer, Regeneron Pharmaceuticals, Sanofi, Takeda Pharmaceuticals and Vertex Pharmaceuticals.

== Publications ==
- Blood, Journal of the American Society of Hematology
- Blood Advances, Journal of the American Society of Hematology
- ASH Clinical News
- The Hematologist
