= 1941 in science =

The year 1941 in science and technology involved some significant events, listed below.

== Biology ==
- George Wells Beadle and Edward Lawrie Tatum publish "Genetic Control of Biochemical Reactions in Neurospora" which shows that specific genes code for specific proteins.
- John William Field develops Field stain to detect malarial parasites.

== Chemistry ==
- February 23 – Chemical element 94, plutonium, is first synthesized by Glenn T. Seaborg, Arthur C. Wahl, Joseph W. Kennedy and Emilio Segrè. It is kept secret until after the atomic bombings of Hiroshima and Nagasaki, as it is being developed for the first atomic bombs.
- Folic acid is first isolated via extraction from spinach leaves by Herschel K. Mitchell, Esmond E. Snell and Roger J. Williams at the University of Texas at Austin.
- The first polyester fibre, polyethylene terephthalate (terylene), is patented by John Rex Whinfield, James T. Dickson and their employer the Calico Printers' Association of Manchester, England.

== Computer science ==
- May 12 – German engineer Konrad Zuse presents the Z3, the world's first working programmable, Turing complete, fully automatic computer, to an audience of aviation engineers in Berlin.
- John Vincent Atanasoff and Clifford E. Berry develop the Atanasoff–Berry Computer.

== History of science ==
- Charles Singer's A Short History of Science to the Nineteenth Century published in the U.K.

== Mathematics ==
- Cahit Arf defines the Arf invariant of a nonsingular quadratic form over a field of characteristic 2.

== Medicine ==
- February 12 – Reserve Constable Albert Alexander, a sepsis patient at the Radcliffe Infirmary in Oxford, becomes the first person treated with penicillin intravenously, by Howard Florey's team, injected by Dr Charles Fletcher. He reacts positively but there is insufficient supply of the drug to reverse his terminal infection. A successful treatment is achieved during May.
- April 1 – Birmingham Accident Hospital opens as the world's first trauma centre in Birmingham, England.
- October 15 – Australian ophthalmologist Norman Gregg announces his discovery of congenital rubella syndrome leading to congenital cataract in the newborn.
- The Pharmacological Basis of Therapeutics is first published in New York City by Alfred Gilman and Louis S. Goodman, pharmacologists at the Yale School of Medicine.

== Mineralogy ==
- German mineralogist Karl Hugo Strunz's Mineralogische Tabellen introduces Nickel–Strunz classification of minerals.

== Physics ==
- June – British scientist G. I. Taylor predicts the blast effects from an atomic bomb.
- June 28 – President of the United States Franklin D. Roosevelt signs Executive Order 8807 creating the Office of Scientific Research and Development with Vannevar Bush as its director. The office is charged with production of an atomic bomb.
- October 1 – Artificial nuclear transmutation of mercury into gold by fast neutrons is reported in Physical Review.
- December 2 – First calutron operated.

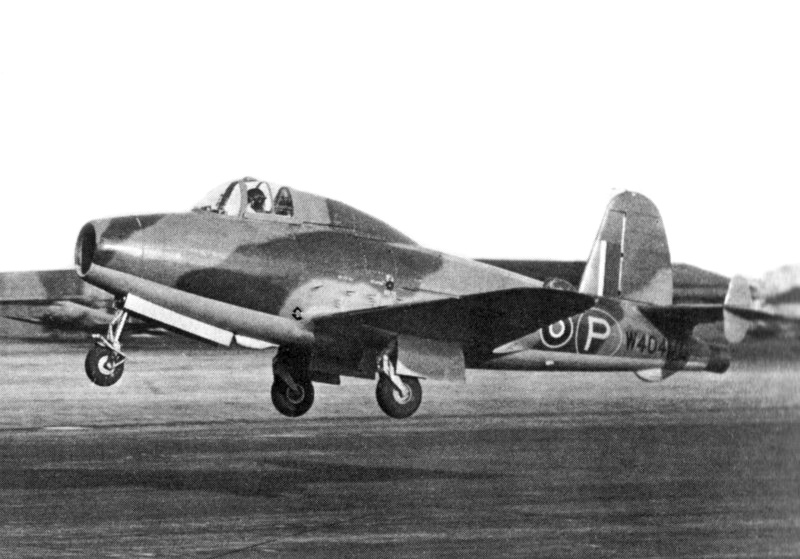
The Gloster E.28/39, the first British aircraft to fly with a turbojet engine

== Technology ==
- May 15 – First flight of the Gloster E.28/39, the first British jet aircraft.
- September 1 – The rocket-powered interceptor aircraft Messerschmitt Me 163 Komet is first flown.
- November – Prototype AI Mk. VIII radar, the first operational microwave-frequency aircraft interception (AI) radar, introduced by the British Royal Air Force.

== Events ==
- February 20 – Polish microbiologist Ludwik Hirszfeld, his wife, Hanka, and daughter are forced to move into the Warsaw Ghetto; here for two years he organizes anti-epidemic measures and vaccination campaigns against typhus and typhoid, as well as conducting secret medical courses.

== Awards ==
- July 4 – Frederick Lindemann is raised to the British peerage as Baron Cherwell.

== Births ==
- January 16 – András Sárközy, Hungarian mathematician.
- January 24 – Dan Shechtman, Israeli winner of the Nobel Prize in Chemistry (2011).
- February 12 – Dennis Sullivan, American mathematician.
- February 19 – David Gross, American particle physicist, winner of the Nobel Prize in Physics (2004).
- March 10 – George P. Smith, American biochemist, winner of the Nobel Prize in Chemistry (2018).
- March 14 – Michael Berry, English mathematical physicist.
- March 26 – Richard Dawkins, British evolutionary biologist.
- March 27 – Simon Campbell, British chemist.
- April 23 – Ray Tomlinson (died 2016), American computer scientist.
- April 28 – Karl Barry Sharpless, American chemist, twice winner of the Nobel Prize in Chemistry (2001, 2022).
- May 25 – Uta Frith, German-born British developmental psychologist.
- June 20 – Robert D. Acland (died 2016), English-born microsurgeon.
- July 23 – Pierre Agostini, French experimental physicist, winner of the Nobel Prize in Physics (2023).
- August 2 – Jules A. Hoffmann, Luxembourg-born winner of the Nobel Prize in Physiology or Medicine (2011).
- August 22 – Peter Murray-Rust, British chemist and Herman Skolnik Award winner.
- September 2 – Shasanka Mohan Roy, Indian quantum physicist.
- September 9 – Dennis Ritchie (died 2011), American computer scientist.
- September 10 – Stephen Jay Gould (died 2002), American paleontologist/evolutionist.
- December 22 – M. Stanley Whittingham, English-born solid-state chemist, winner of the Nobel Prize in Chemistry (2019).
- Vivian Pinn, American physician.

== Deaths ==
- February 21 – Sir Frederick Banting (born 1891), Canadian discoverer of insulin, winner of the Nobel Prize in Physiology or Medicine (1923) (military aircraft accident).
- April 5 – Sir Nigel Gresley (born 1876), English steam locomotive engineer (Flying Scotsman and Mallard).
- April 13 – Annie Jump Cannon (born 1863), American astronomer.
- April 17 – Hans Driesch (born 1867), German biologist and philosopher.
- June 1 – Hans Berger (born 1873), German neurologist.
- June 6 – Louis Chevrolet (born 1878), Swiss-born race driver and automobile builder in the United States.
- July 11 – Sir Arthur Evans (born 1851), English archaeologist.
- July 26 – Henri Lebesgue (born 1875), French mathematician.
- August 14 – Paul Sabatier (born 1854), French chemist, winner of the Nobel Prize in Chemistry (1912).
- August 30 – Peder Oluf Pedersen (born 1874), Danish engineer and physicist.
- September 9 – Hans Spemann (born 1869), German embryologist, winner of the Nobel Prize in Physiology or Medicine (1935).
- November 10 – Carrie Derick (born 1862, Canadian botanist and geneticist.
- November 18 – Walther Nernst (born 1864), German physical chemist.
- November 22 – Kurt Koffka (born 1886, German-born psychologist.
- December 11 – Émile Picard (born 1856), French mathematician.
- December 29 – Tullio Levi-Civita (born 1873), Italian mathematician.
