= Skolnik =

Skolnik, possibly with diacritics, is a Slavic surname literally meaning "school student". Notable people with the surname include:

- Dejan Školnik
- Fred Skolnik
- Harvey Skolnik, birth name of Harvey Miller (screenwriter)
- Herman Skolnik, American chemist, the namesake of the Herman Skolnik Award
- Judith Skolnik
- Merrill Skolnik
- Michael Skolnik, multiple people
- Radoslav Školník

== See also ==
- Shkolnik
