= William Alexander Bain =

Scottish pharmacologist

William Alexander Bain FRSE DSc (20 August 1905 – 24 August 1971) was a Scottish pharmacologist, best known for his early work with antihistamine drugs.

== Early life ==
He was born in Dunbar in East Lothian, the son of Grace Martin Brough and Rev Alexander Wright Bain. He attended Broxburn High School and Bathgate Academy.

In 1923, Bain entered the University of Edinburgh and, after a year, qualified to enter the final honours schools of physiology and of zoology. He graduated in 1928 with first-class honours in physiology—the first to do so in Edward Albert Sharpey-Schafer's new science school.

In 1929 he married Bessie Beveridge Smith.

== Professional life ==
He won the Ellis prize in physiology in 1930 with an essay on heart hormones. In 1931, Bain was appointed Lecturer in Experimental Physiology and elected a Fellow of the Royal Society of Edinburgh, probably the youngest fellow at that time. In 1932 he received his Ph.D from the Faculty of Medicine. The following year was Sharpey-Schafer's last as Professor of Physiology and during it Bain ran the Department of Physiology at the University of Edinburgh. He assisted Sharpey-Schafer in writing the 5th edition of Experimental Physiology and edited the 6th edition after Schafer's death. As his junior colleague, Bain's initial respect for Schafer grew into intense admiration and permanent affection. Schafer's death in 1935 had a marked effect upon him and his influence lasted throughout Bain's life. Indeed, Bain modelled himself upon Schafer in many ways and even his handwriting came to resemble that of his chief.

Bain left Edinburgh on 3 August 1934 to take up a lectureship in physiology at the University of Leeds. His diary entry for that day reads, 'Left Edinburgh, alas! '

In 1958, he assumed the directorship of the new Smith, Kline and French Research Institute at Welwyn Garden City. The move ended his responsibility for pharmacology at Leeds, a responsibility he had carried for almost 25 years, much of the time on his own.

== Scientific work ==
Anyone who saw W. A. Bain setting up a spinal cat, a modified Langendorff Heart, or a cat nerve-muscle preparation, could not fail to be impressed by his skill, elegance and speed. He could cut down, clean and cannulate the femoral vein of a cat, with scalpel and forceps only, before blood had had a chance to ooze.

Three main themes run through his published work-the functioning of the autonomic nerves, the inactivation of the sympathetic transmitter, and the assessment of antihistamine drugs.

Bain's PhD thesis was submitted in 1932 with the title, Studies on the Comparative Physiology of the Heart. The thesis contained a diagram of the apparatus used to demonstrate, on frog hearts, the humoral transmission of the effects of vagus stimulation. This diagram is now known throughout the world for, slightly modified, it has appeared in all editions of The Pharmacological Basis of Therapeutics by Louis Goodman and Alfred Gilman.

After the war, Bain returned to experimental work, and devised a technique for the quantitative assessment in man of antihistamine agents. He measured the area of a wheal provoked by the intradermal injection of histamine before, and at various times after, an antihistamine drug. He was awarded a DSc from the University of Edinburgh in 1953 for his work entitled " Contributions to the study of histamine antagonists in man."

The work of Bain and his department gave rise to the adrenergic-neurone blocking drugs which now play an important role in the control of hypertension.

== Death ==
William died at Oakdene in Digswell, Hertfordshire.
