= Theilheimer =

Theilheimer may refer to:

- William Theilheimer German chemist
- Feodor Theilheimer German Mathematician
