= Nara Institute of Science and Technology =

Graduate university in Nara Prefecture, Japan

Coordinates: 34°43′56″N 135°43′57″E

- 奈良先端科学技術大学院大学
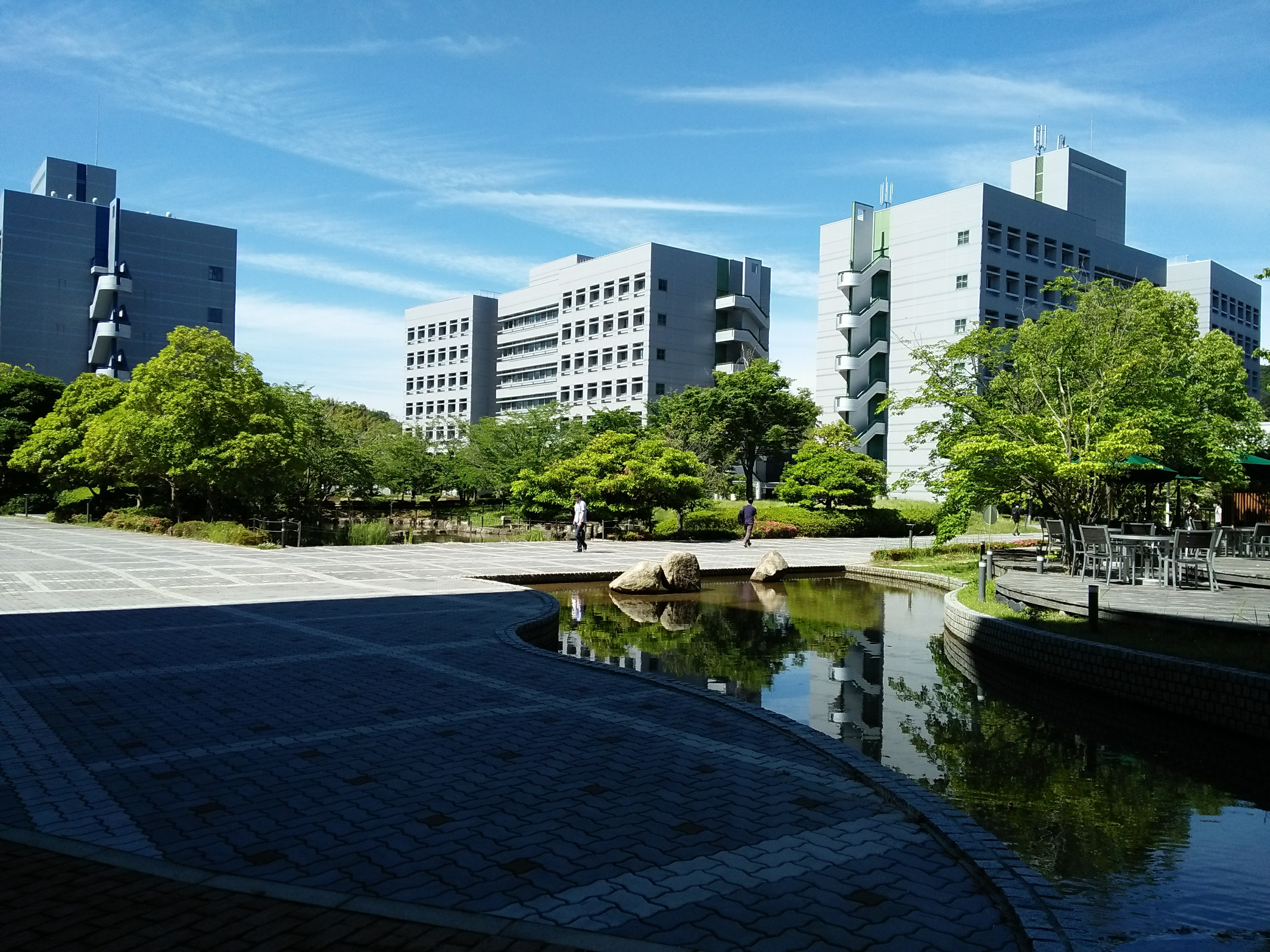
- Type: Public (national)
- Established: October 1991
- President: Kazuhiro Shiozaki (塩﨑 一裕)
- Academic staff: 203
- Students: 1,203
- Postgraduates: 778
- Doctoral students: 425
- Location: Ikoma (Kansai Science City), Nara, Japan
- Campus: Suburban, 139,967 m^{2}
- Mascot: Nasura
- Website: www.naist.jp/en/

Nara Institute of Science and Technology (奈良先端科学技術大学院大学, Nara Sentan Kagaku Gijutsu Daigakuin Daigaku), abbreviated as NAIST, is a Japanese national university located in Ikoma, Nara of Kansai Science City. Established in 1991 as a national graduate university without undergraduate programs, it pursues research and graduate education centered on information science, biological sciences, and materials science. It is one of four national universities in Japan organized solely as graduate universities.

== History ==
From 1986 to 1988, a plan for an advanced science and technology graduate school was discussed as part of efforts to expand and reform graduate education in Japan. In May 1989, a founding preparation office and committee were established at Osaka University. NAIST was designed to be an experimental university without undergraduate facilities. Because it has no undergraduate programs, it admits from a wide range of institutions from Japan and abroad. Most Japanese programs draw mainly from their own undergraduates. After the committee finalized the founding plan for NAIST in 1991, the institute was established on October 1 of that year, with its Graduate School of Information Science and the University Library.

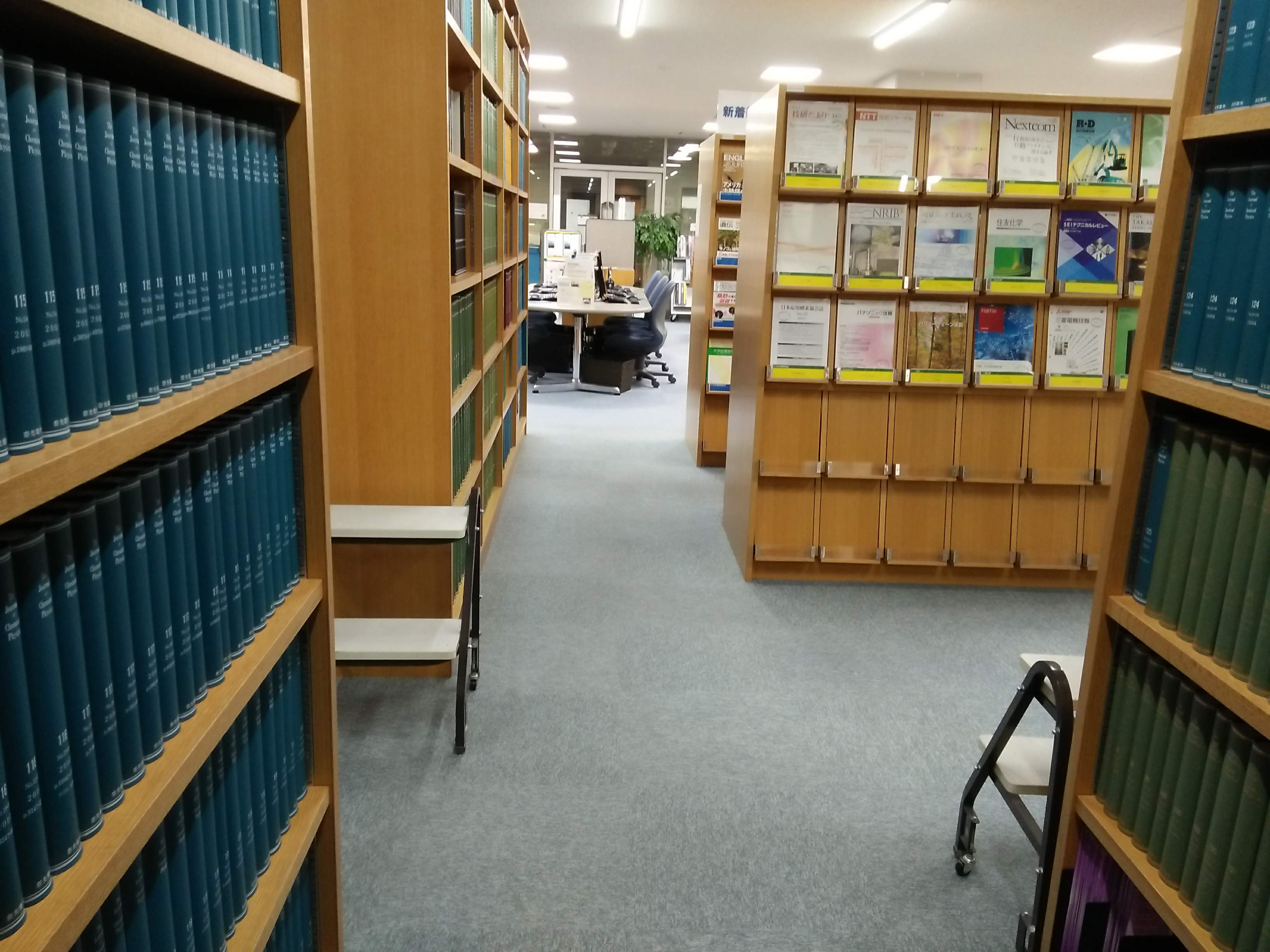
NAIST Library in October 2018

The Graduate School of Biological Sciences was established in April 1992, and the Graduate School of Materials Science was established in May 1996. After it accepted its first doctoral students in April 2000, the three-school structure was complete.

To promote the commercialization of research, the institute established the Venture Business Laboratory and the Intellectual Property Division in 2003 furthered the university's drive to utilize research results to secure patents and licenses, and form new businesses.

In April 2004, along with all of Japan's national universities, NAIST became an independent National University Corporation. In the same month, it opened an industry-government-academia office in Tokyo. The Guesthouse Sentan was completed in May 2004. In March 2006, Gakken Kita-Ikoma Station of the Kinetsu Keihanna Line opened near the campus.

Faculty received national honors around this time. Akita Isogai was named a Person of Cultural Merit in 2008 and executive vice president Shinji Murai received the Japan Academy Prize in 2010. In 2012, former president Yasuyuki Yamada and Shinya Yamanaka were awarded the Order of Culture.

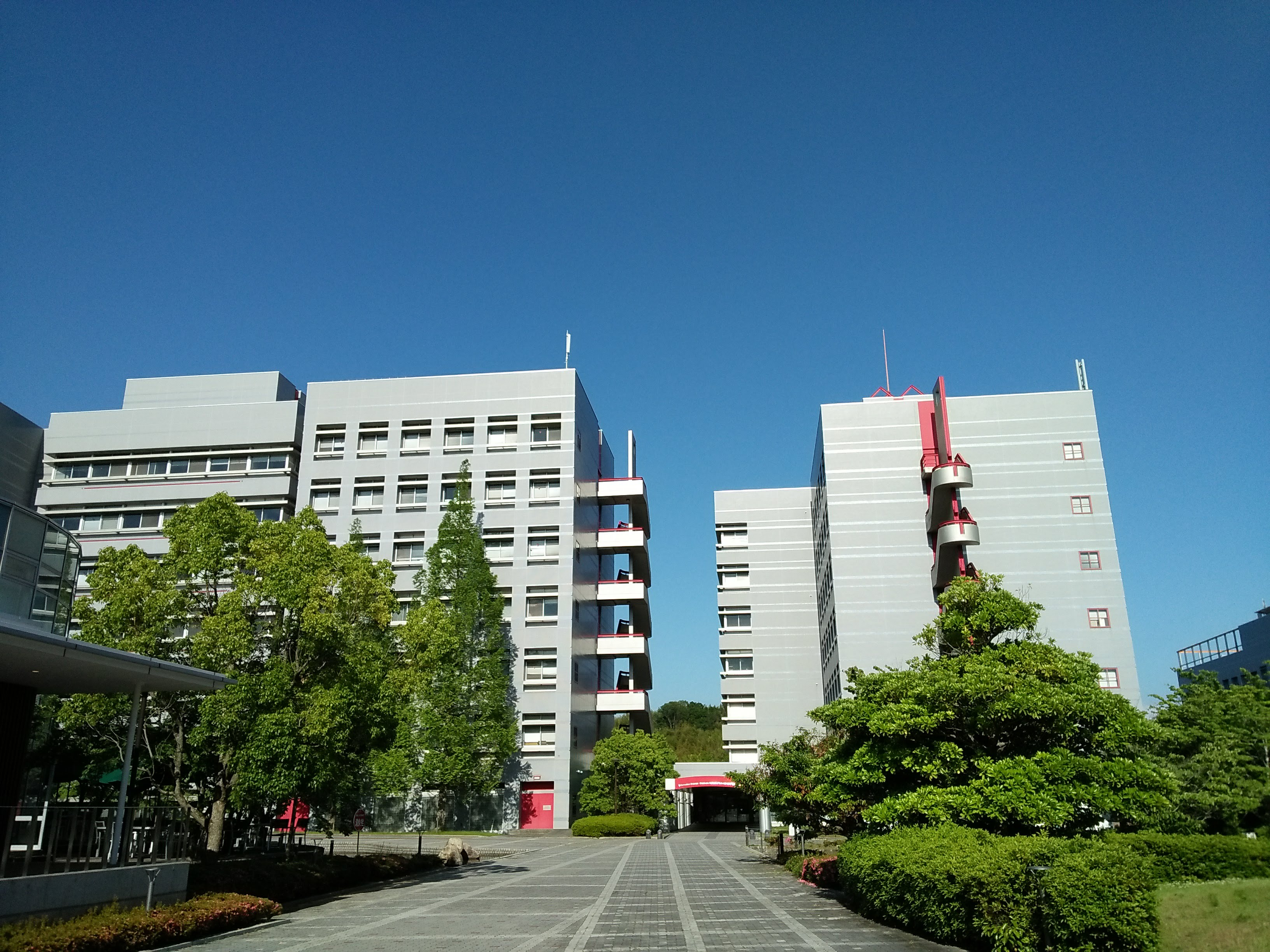
Information science building in June 2018

In April 2011, the Graduate School of Information Science and the Graduate School of Biological Sciences consolidated their departments.

In September 2014, NAIST was one the 37 universities selected for the MEXT's Top Global University Project. Under the project, NAIST committed to a joint degree program, governance reform, a campus supporting cultural diversity, and reorganizing its graduate schools.

In April 2015, the university created a Center for Strategy and Planning, Institute for Educational Initiatives, Institute for Research Initiatives. It closed the Center for International Relations and Institute of Research Initiatives.

Over the next two years, it opened the Data Science Center and overseas educational liaison offices in Indonesia and Thailand. It also created international joint laboratories with École polytechnique and the University of British Columbia.

In April 2018, the Department of Science and Technology, Graduate School of Science and Technology was established. It was a merger of the Graduate School of Information Science, Graduate School of Biological Sciences and the Graduate School of Materials Science.

In 2024, the Center for Digital Green-innovation was brought within the graduate school and a Medilux Research Center was established there.

NAIST was selected for MEXT's J-PEAKS program, one of 13 universities chosen in fiscal year 2024. The five-year project aims to build an open innovation platform with AI research systems, expand collaboration with institutions in Southeast Asia, and train doctoral researchers in automation technologies.

In January 2025, NAIST and Nara Medical University jointly established an association to promote collaboration between medicine and engineering.

== Campus ==
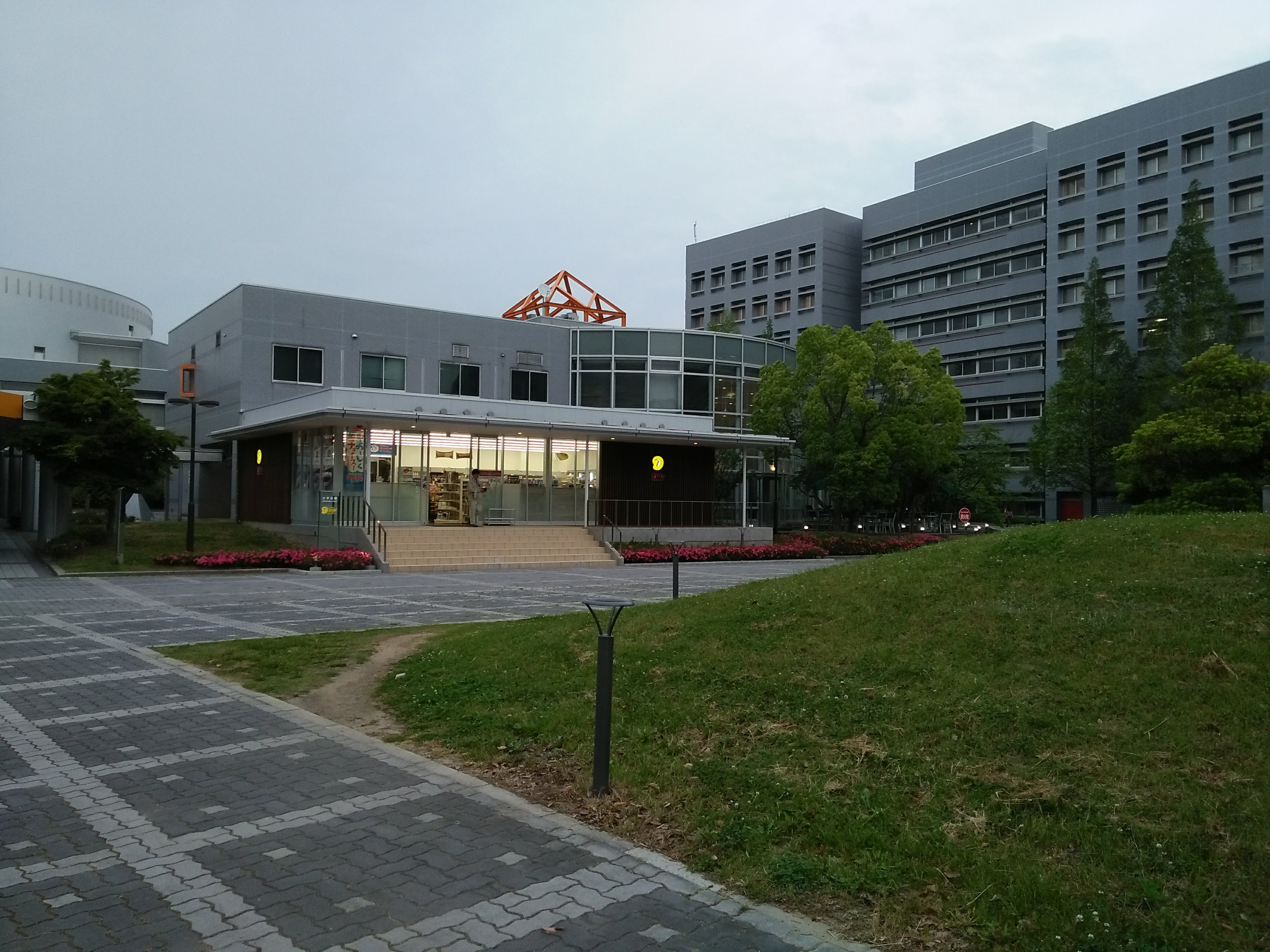
A convenience store on campus in May 2018

The campus is in a rural area located in Kansai Science City, an unincorporated region between Nara, Osaka, and Kyoto prefectures. The closest rail station is about a 20-minute walk from the campus. Buses for Takayama Science Town stop directly at the university.

=== Facilities ===
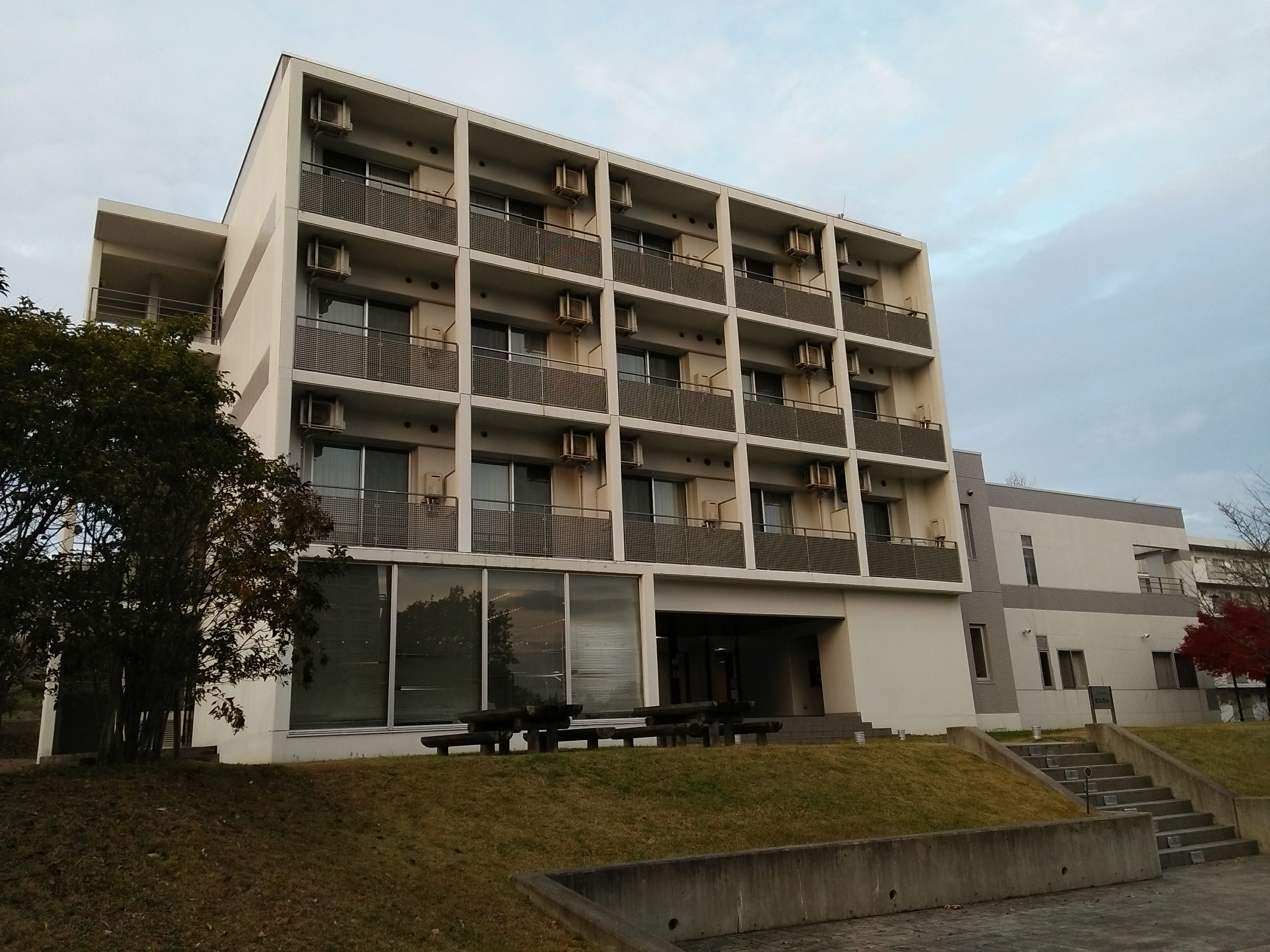
Guesthouse Sentan in December 2018

The University Union has a cafeteria, a convenience store, and a cafe. The Guesthouse Sentan provides lodging for researchers, faculty, staff, and students. The library is open 24/7. A greenhouse is also on the campus. There are two tennis courts, a basketball/volleyball court, and an athletic grass field. There is a Health Care Center with an exam room, a counseling room, and a recovery room, staffed by a doctor, a nurse, and an English-speaking staff.

=== Housing ===
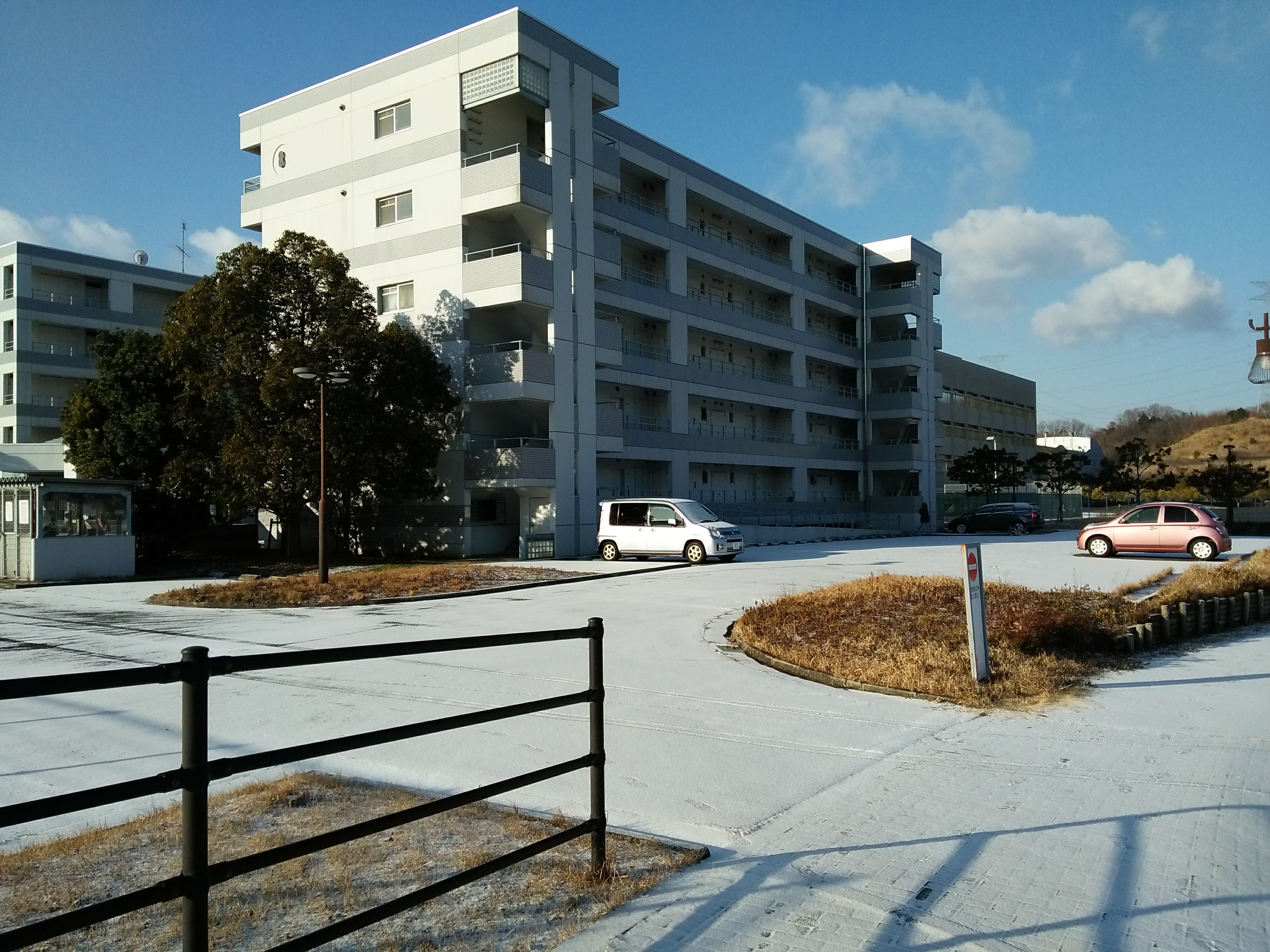
A NAIST dormitory building in February 2018

The university's dorms offer 559 single rooms, 90 single rooms in shared units, 50 married couple units, and 10 family units. Rooms are allocated based on entrance examination results. Each of the nine dormitory buildings have a lounge on the first floor.

== Administration and organization ==
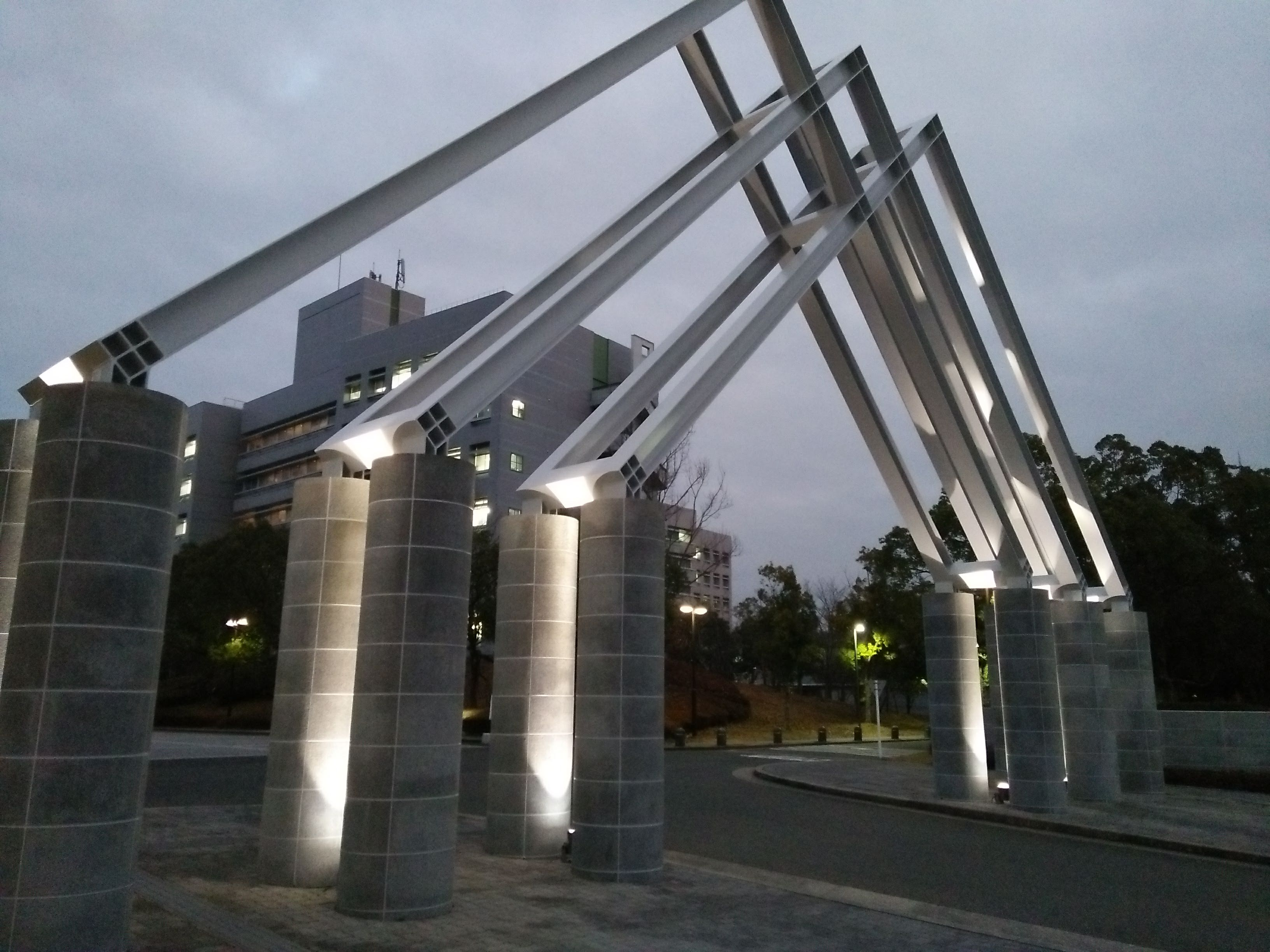
NAIST Gate in January 2019

NAIST is run by a national university corporation headed by the university president. It also has an administrative council for strategic planning.

=== Presidents ===
President name	Term
Akira Sakurai (櫻井 洸)	1991-1997
Yasuyuki Yamada (山田 康之)	1997–2001
Koji Torii (鳥居 宏次)	2001–2005
Kunio Yasuda (安田 國雄)	2005–2009
Akira Isogai (磯貝 彰)	2009–2013
Naotake Ogasawara (小笠原 直毅)	2013–2017
Naokazu Yokoya (横矢 直和)	2017–2021
Kazuhiro Shiozaki (塩﨑 一裕)	2021–present

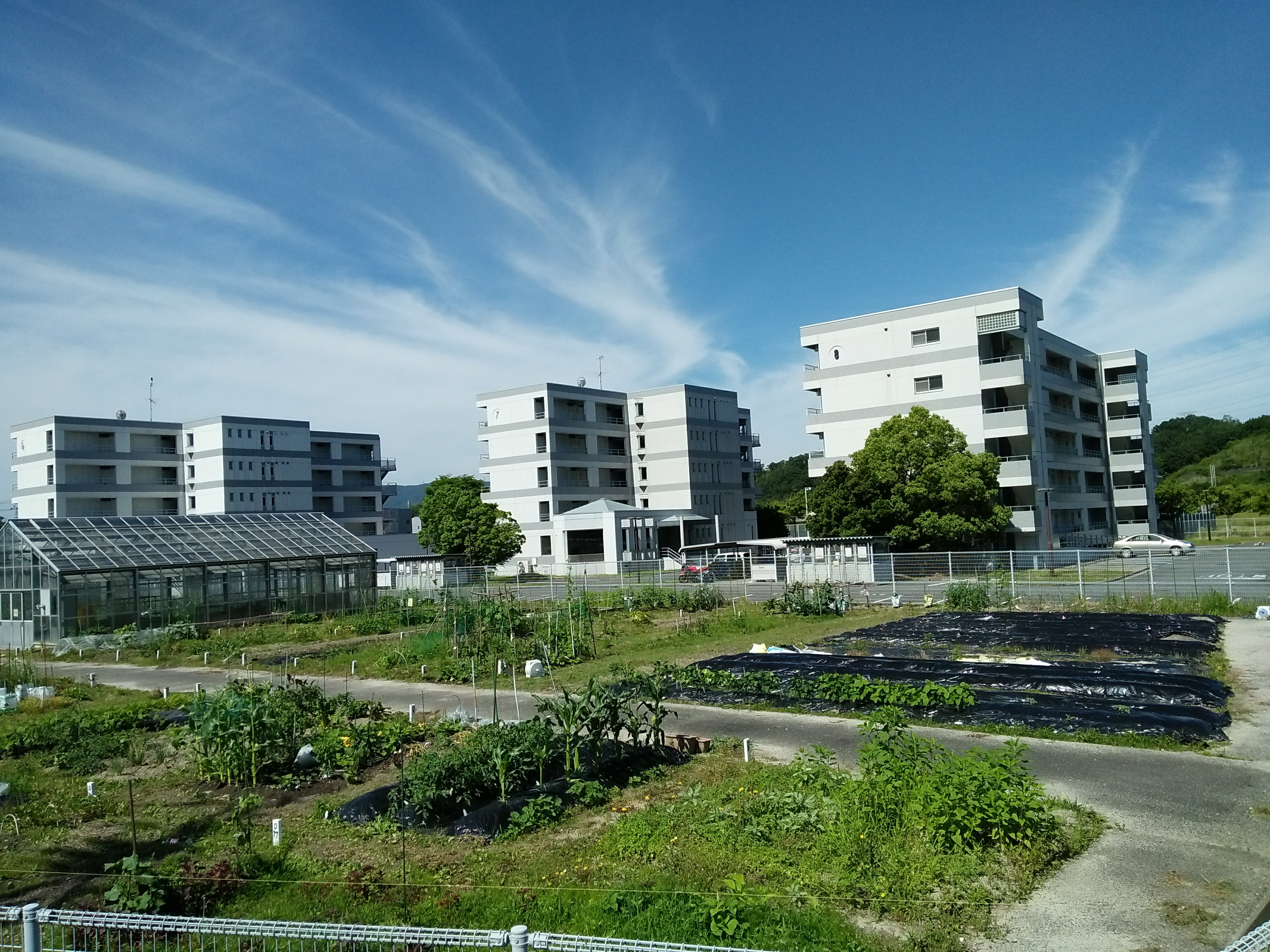
Plant lab in June 2018

=== Graduate schools (after 2018) ===
From April 2018, the past three graduate schools (Graduate School of Information Sciences, Graduate School of Biological Sciences, Graduate School of Materials Science) were integrated into one research department, Graduate School of Science and Technology.

=== Centers and facilities ===
- Life Science Collaboration Center
- Center for Material Research Platform
- Information Initiative Center
- Center for Frontier Science and Technology
- Center for Industry-Government-Academia Collaboration
- Center for International Relations

== Student life ==
=== Student body and admissions ===
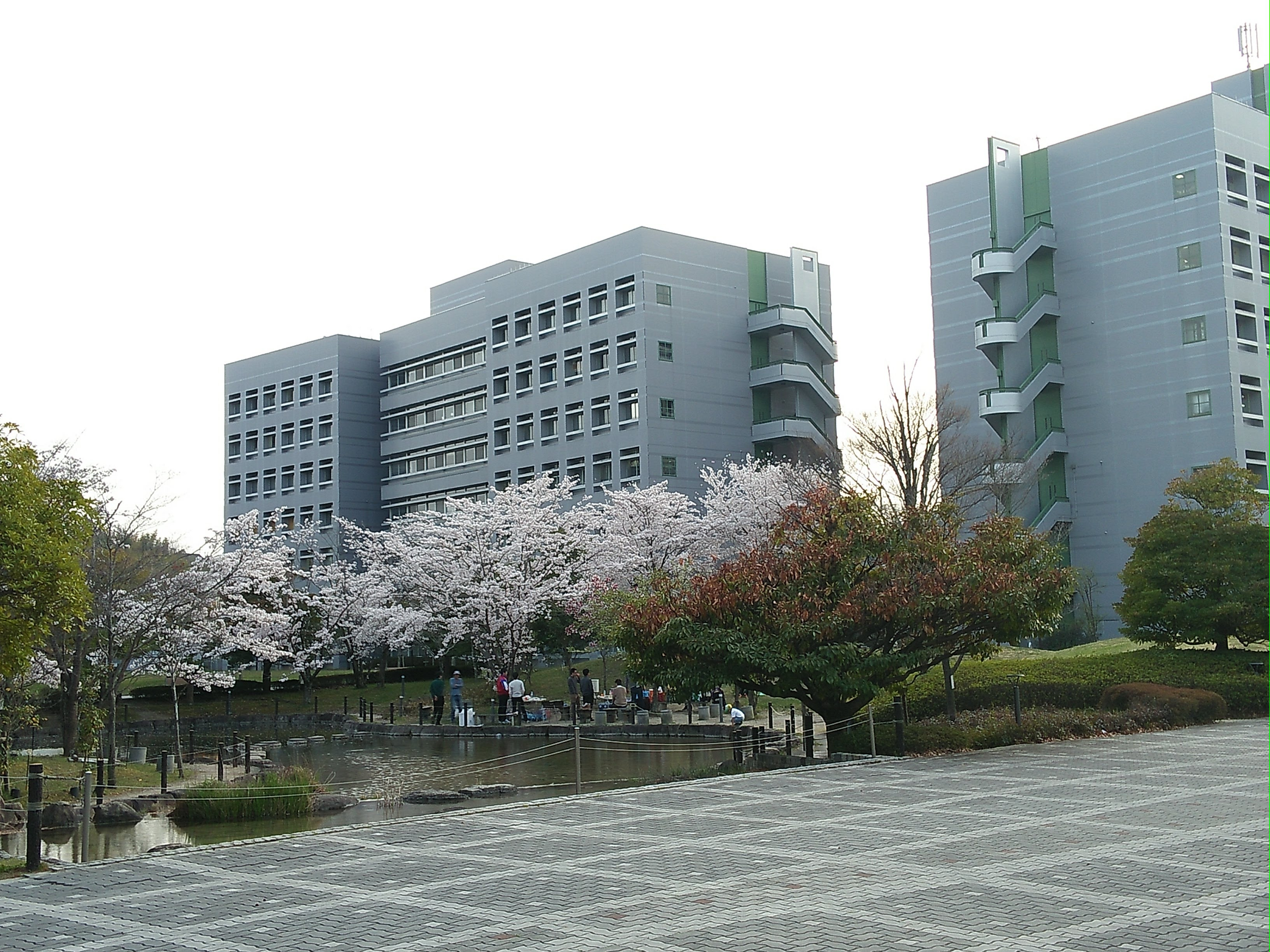
NAIST in spring

As of May 2025, NAIST enrolled 1,203 students, of which 778 were in master's programs and 425 in doctoral programs. International students numbered 293 of the total student body, but made up approximately 46% of the doctoral students. Of the 1,203 students enrolled in May 2025, 338 were women and 293 were international students. NAIST admits students twice a year, in spring and fall. The university offers coursework, research training, and dissertation defenses in both Japanese and English. The entrance process consists of an oral exam, a document review, and English test scores.

=== Extracurricular activities ===
NAIST had 17 certified extracurricular groups as of July 2026. There is a science communication group, sports clubs, a tea ceremony club, a volunteer club, an entrepreneurship club, and others.

== Notable research ==
- ARToolKit
- ChaSen
- DyNet
- Induced pluripotent stem cell
- MeCab
- Natural language processing

== Notable researchers ==
- Shinya Yamanaka – Former professor, 2012 Nobel Prize for Physiology or Medicine winner
- Kimito Funatsu – Research director of the Data Science Center, 2019 Herman Skolnik Award winner
