= Alfred G. Gilman =

American pharmacologist (1941–2015)

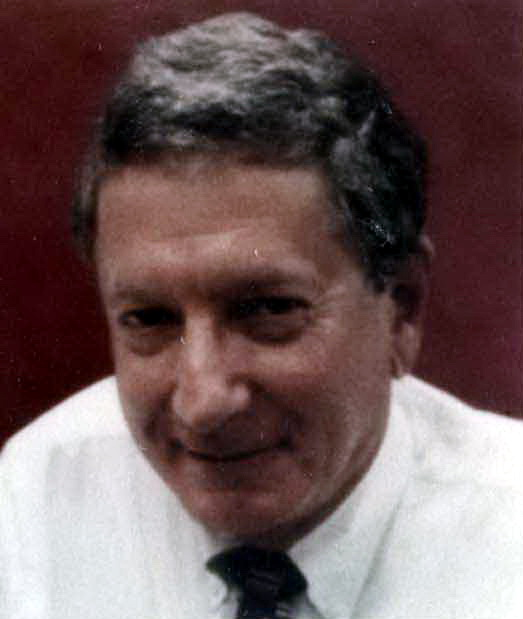
- Born: Alfred Goodman Gilman; July 1, 1941; New Haven, Connecticut, U.S
- Died: December 23, 2015 (aged 74); Dallas, Texas, U.S.
- Education: Yale University (B.A., 1962); Case Western Reserve University (MD-Ph.D., 1969)
- Known for: G proteins
- Spouse: Kathryn Hedlund
- Children: 3
- Awards: John J. Abel Award (1975); Richard Lounsbery Award (1987); Louisa Gross Horwitz Prize (1989); Nobel Prize in Physiology or Medicine (1994)
- Scientific career
- Fields: Biochemistry; Pharmacology

Alfred Goodman Gilman (July 1, 1941 – December 23, 2015) was an American pharmacologist and biochemist. He and Martin Rodbell shared the 1994 Nobel Prize in Physiology or Medicine "for their discovery of G-proteins and the role of these proteins in signal transduction in cells."

Gilman was the son of Alfred Gilman, who co-authored Goodman & Gilman's The Pharmacological Basis of Therapeutics with Louis S. Goodman, from whom his middle name came. He earned a BA in biology with major in biochemistry from Yale University. Immediately after graduation in 1962, he worked with Allan Conney at Burroughs Wellcome & Company, which resulted in the publication of his first two technical papers. Persuaded by Earl Wilbur Sutherland, Jr., he joined Case Western Reserve University School of Medicine for an MD–PhD course. He obtained his degree in 1969. He then went to the National Institutes of Health to work with Marshall Nirenberg between 1969 and 1971.

Gilman became assistant professor of pharmacology at the University of Virginia School of Medicine in 1971, and full professor in 1977. He chaired the Department of Pharmacology at the University of Texas Southwestern Medical Center at Dallas from 1981. Upon his retirement in 2009, he was appointed chief scientific officer of the Cancer Prevention and Research Institute of Texas. He resigned in 2012. He was the founder of Regeneron Pharmaceuticals company and the Alliance for Cellular Signaling. From 2005, he was also director of Eli Lilly and Company.

G proteins are a vital intermediary between the extracellular activation of receptors (G protein-coupled receptors) on the cell membrane and actions within the cell. Rodbell had shown in the 1960s that GTP was involved in cell signaling. It was Gilman who actually discovered the proteins that interacted with the GTP to initiate signalling cascades within the cell, and thus, giving the name G proteins.

For his works, he received the Canada Gairdner Foundation International Award in 1984, Albert Lasker Award for Basic Medical Research and the Louisa Gross Horwitz Prize in 1989, in addition to Nobel Prize. He was elected member of the National Academy of Sciences and American Academy of Arts and Sciences, Fellow of the American Association for Cancer Research Academy, and, since 2013 (or earlier), member of the advisory council of the National Center for Science Education.

== Early life ==
Gilman was born in New Haven, Connecticut, as he later commented, "with a scientific/academic silver spoon" in his mouth, "or perhaps a pestle (but not the mortar)." His parents were Mabel (Schmidt) and Alfred Gilman, a professor at the Yale School of Medicine and one of the authors of the classic pharmacology textbook Goodman & Gilman's The Pharmacological Basis of Therapeutics (nicknamed the "Blue Bible" of pharmacology). His family is Jewish. His middle name was in honor of the co-author Louis S. Goodman. The book was published in 1941, the year he was born. His friend Michael Stuart Brown (who was also born in 1941, and later the 1985 Nobel Prize in Physiology or Medicine laureate) joked that Gilman was "probably the only person who was ever named after a textbook." (Gilman later served as one of the textbook's editors from 1980 to 2000, first collaborating with, then succeeding his father and Goodman.) He had an elder sister Joanna Gilman. He grew up in White Plains, New York, while his father worked at Columbia University and Albert Einstein College of Medicine.

== Education ==
Gilman attended local elementary school in White Plains. Hoping for better education, in 1955 his parents sent him to The Taft School in Watertown, Connecticut, where he completed grades 10 to 12. The school was known for its sports activity, and he described it as "a strict, monastic, and frankly unpleasant environment in the 1950s: academic boot camp." He recalled that he was "the worst 120-pound lineman on the intramural tackle football team." He studied science at Yale University. His first research project was to test the adaptor hypothesis of Francis Crick. He worked in the laboratory of Melvin Simpson, where he met his future wife Kathryn Hedlund. (They were married in 1963.) He graduated in 1962 receiving a BA in biology with major in biochemistry. During summer break in 1962, he briefly worked at Burroughs Wellcome & Company in New York, under with Allan Conney. With Conney he published his first two research papers in 1963. He then entered a combined MD-PhD program at Case Western Reserve University School of Medicine in Cleveland, Ohio where he wanted to study under Nobel laureate pharmacologist Earl Sutherland, who was a close friend of his father. It was Sutherland who had introduced the combined MD-PhD course, and invited Gilman to join course. But to Gilman, a seven-year program was like "an eternity in purgatory" and that he preferred not to have a degree in pharmacology, so he refused. Sutherland later persuaded him by explaining that pharmacology was "just biochemistry with a purpose." However, Sutherland was departing for Vanderbilt University, so Gilman studied with Sutherland's collaborator, Theodore Rall. Gilman graduated from Case Western in 1969, then did his post-doctoral studies at the National Institutes of Health with Nobel laureate Marshall Nirenberg from 1969 to 1971. Nirenberg assigned him to work on the study of nerve endings (axons from cultured neuroblastoma cells), which he considered as "a truly boring project." Instead, against the advice of Nirenberg, he worked on a new method for studying protein binding. After six weeks of working, he showed his result to Nirenberg, who immediately communicated it and got it published in 1970. The work was a simple and vital biochemical assay for studying cyclic AMP.

== Career ==
In 1971, Gilman was appointed assistant professor of pharmacology at the University of Virginia, School of Medicine, in Charlottesville, Virginia. He became full professor in 1977. In 1981, he became chairman of the Department of Pharmacology at the University of Texas Southwestern Medical Center at Dallas. From 2004 he became the dean, and between 2006 and 2009 he was executive vice president for academic affairs and provost. He retired from university in 2009 to hold the office the chief scientific officer of the Cancer Prevention and Research Institute of Texas. He, however, resigned after three years as he felt that the administration was under commercial and political pressures. His resignation was followed by seven senior scientists.

In addition to mainstream academic position he held other key positions. He was one of the founders of Regeneron, a biotechnology company headquartered in Tarrytown, New York. He was also the founder and Chair of the Alliance for Cellular Signaling, a global collaboration for the study of cell signalling. He became its director from 1990. In 2005, he was appointed director of the drug company, Eli Lilly & Co.

== Death ==
Gilman died after a long battle with pancreatic cancer in Dallas, Texas, on December 23, 2015, at the age of 74. He was survived by his wife and three children, Amy Ariagno and Anne Sincovec, both of Dallas, and Edward Gilman of Austin.

== Contributions ==
=== Discovery of G protein ===
In the 1960s, Earl Sutherland and Theodore Rall discovered that cyclic AMP (the second messenger in signal transduction) was a responsible for activating enzymes in the cell, and that cyclic AMP is produced only when hormones (the first messengers) bind on the cell surface. Cyclic AMP is formed from ATP by the enzymes adenylyl cyclase. In 1970 Martin Rodbell found that hormones did not directly influence cyclic AMP, but there existed other molecules, the third messengers. Rodbell discovered that cyclic AMP is activated when guanosine triphosphate (GTP) is released from the cell membrane. He, however, did not know how the GTP molecules were produced. Gilman pursued the mystery in the signalling process. He found that in lymphoma (cancer) cells, hormones lost their activity to activate adenylyl cyclase, thereby losing their ability to produce cyclic AMP. This was due to loss of proteins in these cancer cells. When he introduced the missing protein from normal cells into the cancer cells, normal hormone action was produced. This showed that the missing membrane protein was responsible for mediating hormonal signal to cyclic AMP by producing GTP. His findings were published in a series of papers between 1977 and 1979. In 1980, he succeeded in identifying and isolating the new protein, which he named G protein, as it specifically binds to GTP molecules.

=== Defending science education ===
Gilman played active roles in defending science education, and opposing creationism. He opposed the Texas state board of education in 2003 when the board tried to remove evolution from science curriculum. He was the leader of scientists of the US National Academy of Sciences, including Nobel laureates, to publicly criticize the board in The Dallas Morning News. He eventually became member of the advisory council of the National Centre for Science Education. He also opposed the Institute for Creation Research on its application for certification of its graduate course. He commented: "How can Texas simultaneously launch a war on cancer and approve educational platforms that submit that the universe is 10,000 years old?" He was also one of the signatories on the petition against the Louisiana Science Education Act of 2008.

== Awards and honours ==
Gilman was given the Canada Gairdner International Award in 1984 "For elucidating the mechanism by which peptide hormones act across cell membranes to influence cell function." He received the Albert Lasker Award for Basic Medical Research as well as the Louisa Gross Horwitz Prize from Columbia University in 1989 together with Edwin Krebs. In 1995, Gilman received the Golden Plate Award of the American Academy of Achievement. In 2005, he was elected as Dean of University of Texas Southwestern Medical School, Dallas. He served on the board of advisors of Scientists and Engineers for America, an organization focused on promoting sound science in American government. He was elected as a member of the National Academy of Sciences in 1986. He was elected Fellow of the American Association for Cancer Research Academy in 2013. He was elected member of American Academy of Arts and Sciences. He received honorary doctorates from Case Western Reserve University, Yale University, University of Chicago, and University of Miami.

== Key papers ==
- Seeds, NW; Gilman, AG (1971). "Norepinephrine stimulated increase of cyclic AMP levels in developing mouse brain cell cultures". Science. 174 (4006): 292. Bibcode:1971Sci...174..292S. doi:10.1126/science.174.4006.292. PMID 4330303. S2CID 98674465.
- Gilman, AG; Nirenberg, M (1971). "Regulation of adenosine 3',5'-cyclic monophosphate metabolism in cultured neuroblastoma cells". Nature. 234 (5328): 356–8. Bibcode:1971Natur.234..356G. doi:10.1038/234356a0. PMID 4332686. S2CID 4169292.
- Secrist, John A.; Barrio, Jorge R.; Leonard, Nelson J.; Villar-Palasi, Carlos; Gilman, Alfred G. (July 27, 1972). "Fluorescent Modification of Adenosine 3′,5′-Monophosphate: Spectroscopic Properties and Activity in Enzyme Systems". Science. 177 (4045): 279–280. Bibcode:1972Sci...177..279S. doi:10.1126/science.177.4045.279. ISSN 0036-8075. PMID 4339302. S2CID 23752942.
- Sternweis, PC; Northup, JK; Smigel, MD; Gilman, AG (1981). "The regulatory component of adenylate cyclase. Purification and properties". The Journal of Biological Chemistry. 256 (22): 11517–26. doi:10.1016/S0021-9258(19)68431-0. PMID 6271754.
- Hanski, E; Sternweis, PC; Northup, JK; Dromerick, AW; Gilman, AG (1981). "The regulatory component of adenylate cyclase. Purification and properties of the turkey erythrocyte protein". The Journal of Biological Chemistry. 256 (24): 12911–9. doi:10.1016/S0021-9258(18)42983-3. PMID 6273414.
- Schleifer, LS; Kahn, RA; Hanski, E; Northup, JK; Sternweis, PC; Gilman, AG (1982). "Requirements for cholera toxin-dependent ADP-ribosylation of the purified regulatory component of adenylate cyclase". The Journal of Biological Chemistry. 257 (1): 20–3. doi:10.1016/S0021-9258(19)68316-X. PMID 6273425.
- Northup, JK; Smigel, MD; Gilman, AG (1982). "The guanine nucleotide activating site of the regulatory component of adenylate cyclase. Identification by ligand binding". The Journal of Biological Chemistry. 257 (19): 11416–23. doi:10.1016/S0021-9258(18)33775-X. PMID 6288684.
- Manning, DR; Gilman, AG (1983). "The regulatory components of adenylate cyclase and transducin. A family of structurally homologous guanine nucleotide-binding proteins". The Journal of Biological Chemistry. 258 (11): 7059–63. doi:10.1016/S0021-9258(18)32332-9. PMID 6304074.
- Northup, JK; Sternweis, PC; Gilman, AG (1983). "The subunits of the stimulatory regulatory component of adenylate cyclase. Resolution, activity, and properties of the 35,000-dalton (beta) subunit". The Journal of Biological Chemistry. 258 (18): 11361–8. doi:10.1016/S0021-9258(17)44426-7. PMID 6309843.
- Northup, JK; Smigel, MD; Sternweis, PC; Gilman, AG (1983). "The subunits of the stimulatory regulatory component of adenylate cyclase. Resolution of the activated 45,000-dalton (alpha) subunit". The Journal of Biological Chemistry. 258 (18): 11369–76. doi:10.1016/S0021-9258(17)44427-9. PMID 6309844.
- Hurley, JB; Simon, MI; Teplow, DB; Robishaw, JD; Gilman, AG (1984). "Homologies between signal transducing G proteins and ras gene products". Science. 226 (4676): 860–2. Bibcode:1984Sci...226..860H. doi:10.1126/science.6436980. PMID 6436980.
- Gilman, AG (1984). "G proteins and dual control of adenylate cyclase". Cell. 36 (3): 577–9. doi:10.1016/0092-8674(84)90336-2. PMID 6321035. S2CID 36861537.
- Bokoch, GM; Gilman, AG (1984). "Inhibition of receptor-mediated release of arachidonic acid by pertussis toxin". Cell. 39 (2 Pt 1): 301–8. doi:10.1016/0092-8674(84)90008-4. PMID 6094010.
- Harris, BA; Robishaw, JD; Mumby, SM; Gilman, AG (1985). "Molecular cloning of complementary DNA for the alpha subunit of the G protein that stimulates adenylate cyclase". Science. 229 (4719): 1274–7. Bibcode:1985Sci...229.1274H. doi:10.1126/science.3839937. PMID 3839937.
- Mattera, R; Graziano, MP; Yatani, A; Zhou, Z; Graf, R; Codina, J; Birnbaumer, L; Gilman, AG; Brown, AM (1989). "Splice variants of the alpha subunit of the G protein Gs activate both adenylyl cyclase and calcium channels". Science. 243 (4892): 804–7. Bibcode:1989Sci...243..804M. doi:10.1126/science.2536957. PMID 2536957.
- Krupinski, J; Coussen, F; Bakalyar, HA; Tang, WJ; Feinstein, PG; Orth, K; Slaughter, C; Reed, RR; Gilman, AG (1989). "Adenylyl cyclase amino acid sequence: possible channel- or transporter-like structure". Science. 244 (4912): 1558–64. Bibcode:1989Sci...244.1558K. doi:10.1126/science.2472670. PMID 2472670.
- Tang, WJ; Gilman, AG (1991). "Type-specific regulation of adenylyl cyclase by G protein beta gamma subunits". Science. 254 (5037): 1500–3. Bibcode:1991Sci...254.1500T. doi:10.1126/science.1962211. PMID 1962211.
- Taussig, R; Iñiguez-Lluhi, JA; Gilman, AG (1993). "Inhibition of adenylyl cyclase by Gi alpha". Science. 261 (5118): 218–21. Bibcode:1993Sci...261..218T. doi:10.1126/science.8327893. PMID 8327893.
- Wickman, KD; Iñiguez-Lluhl, JA; Davenport, PA; Taussig, R; Krapivinsky, GB; Linder, ME; Gilman, AG; Clapham, DE (1994). "Recombinant G-protein beta gamma-subunits activate the muscarinic-gated atrial potassium channel". Nature. 368 (6468): 255–7. Bibcode:1994Natur.368..255W. doi:10.1038/368255a0. PMID 8145826. S2CID 4367498.
- Coleman, D.; Berghuis, A.; Lee, E; Linder, M.; Gilman, A.; Sprang (1994). "Structures of active conformations of Gi alpha 1 and the mechanism of GTP hydrolysis". Science. 265 (5177): 1405–1412. Bibcode:1994Sci...265.1405C. doi:10.1126/science.8073283. PMID 8073283.
- Tang, WJ; Gilman, AG (1995). "Construction of a soluble adenylyl cyclase activated by Gs alpha and forskolin". Science. 268 (5218): 1769–72. Bibcode:1995Sci...268.1769T. doi:10.1126/science.7792604. PMID 7792604.
- Mixon, MB; Lee, E; Coleman, DE; Berghuis, AM; Gilman, AG; Sprang, SR (1995). "Tertiary and quaternary structural changes in Gi alpha 1 induced by GTP hydrolysis". Science. 270 (5238): 954–60. Bibcode:1995Sci...270..954M. doi:10.1126/science.270.5238.954. PMID 7481799. S2CID 86608235.
- Wall, MA; Coleman, DE; Lee, E; Iñiguez-Lluhi, JA; Posner, BA; Gilman, AG; Sprang, SR (1995). "The structure of the G protein heterotrimer Gi alpha 1 beta 1 gamma 2". Cell. 83 (6): 1047–58. doi:10.1016/0092-8674(95)90220-1. PMID 8521505. S2CID 18993038.
- Berman, David M; Wilkie, Thomas M; Gilman, Alfred G (1996). "GAIP and RGS4 Are GTPase-Activating Proteins for the Gi Subfamily of G Protein α Subunits". Cell. 86 (3): 445–452. doi:10.1016/S0092-8674(00)80117-8. PMID 8756726. S2CID 12427406.
- Sunahara, RK; Tesmer, JJ; Gilman, AG; Sprang, SR (1997). "Crystal structure of the adenylyl cyclase activator Gsalpha". Science. 278 (5345): 1943–7. Bibcode:1997Sci...278.1943S. doi:10.1126/science.278.5345.1943. PMID 9395396. S2CID 33114065.
- Tesmer, JJ; Sunahara, RK; Gilman, AG; Sprang, SR (1997). "Crystal structure of the catalytic domains of adenylyl cyclase in a complex with Gsalpha.GTPgammaS". Science. 278 (5345): 1907–16. Bibcode:1997Sci...278.1907T. doi:10.1126/science.278.5345.1907. PMID 9417641.

== See also ==
- List of Jewish Nobel laureates
