= Canterbury v. Spence =

United States legal case that estable the principle of informed consent

Canterbury v. Spence (464 F.2d. 772, 782 D.C. Cir. 1972) was a landmark federal case decided by the United States Court of Appeals for the District of Columbia Circuit that significantly reshaped malpractice law in the United States. It established the idea of "informed consent" to medical procedures. The doctrine of informed consent has also been extended to pharmaceutical drugs, as demonstrated by the rulings in Reyes v. Wyeth Laboratories and McPherson v. Ellis.

== Background ==
Until the 1960s, it was conventional medical doctrine to withhold significant information from patients, particularly potentially upsetting information. It was common practice not to tell a patient they were dying, and even to deny it. When health care providers began to move away from that practice, many still did not fully inform patients who were about to make decisions about future health care and particularly surgery. Instead, many practitioners revealed only information that another physician might provide, following a rule known as "the professional standard". Risks, in particular, were often glossed over or omitted entirely. Although the right to consent in medical situations had been recognized for decades, the notion of informed consent was new.

== The case ==
Jerry Watson Canterbury (1939–2017) was an FBI clerk who suffered a ruptured disk in 1958. He received laminectomy by Dr. William T. Spence, a well-known Washington neurosurgeon, and as a result of the surgery, and a subsequent fall from his bed while hospitalized, he ended up paralyzed below the waist and incontinent. Canterbury sued for malpractice on the grounds of negligence.

He was discharged from the hospital three and a half months later, his legs partly paralyzed. During the 1968 trial, the defense argued that since Canterbury lacked expert testimony, the case could not proceed. This lack of testimony was likely the result of a "conspiracy of silence" that, at the time, prevented doctors from testifying against one another. Judge Spottswood W. Robinson III of the DC Circuit Court allowed the case to go to a jury, deciding both that an expert was not necessary in such cases and that the standard for informed consent was what a reasonable patient would want to know in rendering a decision. At the second trial, Spence acknowledged that he had told Canterbury and his mother only that the surgery might result in “weakness" without mentioning paralysis, and that he avoided a more specific warning so as not to deter the patient from pursuing the operation. Nevertheless, the jury ruled against Canterbury.

== Impact ==
According to Dr. Jacob M. Appel, "[t]he major legal implication of the decision...was that it largely shifted our culture from a ‘professional practice standard’ to a ‘reasonable person standard’ in malpractice cases, undermined the tradition and practice of physicians not testifying against each other, and largely opened the floodgates to the far more litigious medicolegal culture we have today."

== See also ==
- Michael Skolnik Medical Transparency Act
