= Skolnick =

Skolnick is a surname. Notable people with the surname include:

- Alex Skolnick (born 1968), American guitarist
- Andrew A. Skolnick, American science writer
- Arnold Skolnick (1937–2022), American graphic artist and publisher
- Evan Skolnick (born 1931), American writer
- Jerome Herbert Skolnick, American criminologist
- Jeffrey Skolnick, American computational biologist
- Phil Skolnick (born 1947), American neuroscientist
- Sherman Skolnick (1930–2006), American political activist and conspiracy theorist

== See also ==
- Shkolnik
