= ChaSen =

Morphological parser for the Japanese language

ChaSen is a morphological parser for the Japanese language. This tool for analyzing morphemes was developed at the Matsumoto laboratory, Nara Institute of Science and Technology.

== See also ==
- MeCab
