= World Wide Molecular Matrix =

Proposed repository for chemical data

The World Wide Molecular Matrix (WWMM) was a proposed electronic repository for unpublished chemical data. First introduced in 2002 by Peter Murray-Rust and his colleagues in the chemistry department at the University of Cambridge in the United Kingdom, WWMM provided a free, easily searchable database for information about thousands of complicated molecules, data that would otherwise remain inaccessible to scientists.

Murray-Rust, a chemical informatics specialist, has estimated that 80% of the results produced by chemists around the world is never published in scientific journals. Most of this data is not ground-breaking, yet it could conceivably be of use to scientists doing related projects—if they could access it. The WWMM was proposed as a solution to this problem. It would house the results of experiments on over 100,000 molecules in physical chemistry, organic chemistry, biochemistry and medicinal chemistry.

In other scientific fields, the need for a similar depository to house inaccessible information could be more acute. In a presentation at the "CERN Workshop on Innovations in Scholarly Communications (OAI4)", Murray-Rust said that chemistry actually leads other fields in published data. He estimated that the majority of the data in some scientific fields never reaches publication.

Although scientific in nature, the WWMM was part of the broader open archives and open source movements, pushes to make more and more information freely available to any user via the Internet or World Wide Web. In his CERN presentation, Murray-Rust stated that the WWMM was a "response to the expense of [scientific] journals", and he asked the rhetorical question, "Can we win the war to make data open, or will it be absorbed into the publishing and pseudo-publishing world?" Murray-Rust and his colleagues are also responsible for the development of the Chemical Mark-up Language (CML), a variant of XML intended for chemists.

== See also ==
- Chemical Mark-up language (CML)
- The open archives initiative (OAI)
- The science of Informatics
