= Henry Rzepa =

Computational organic chemist at Imperial College London

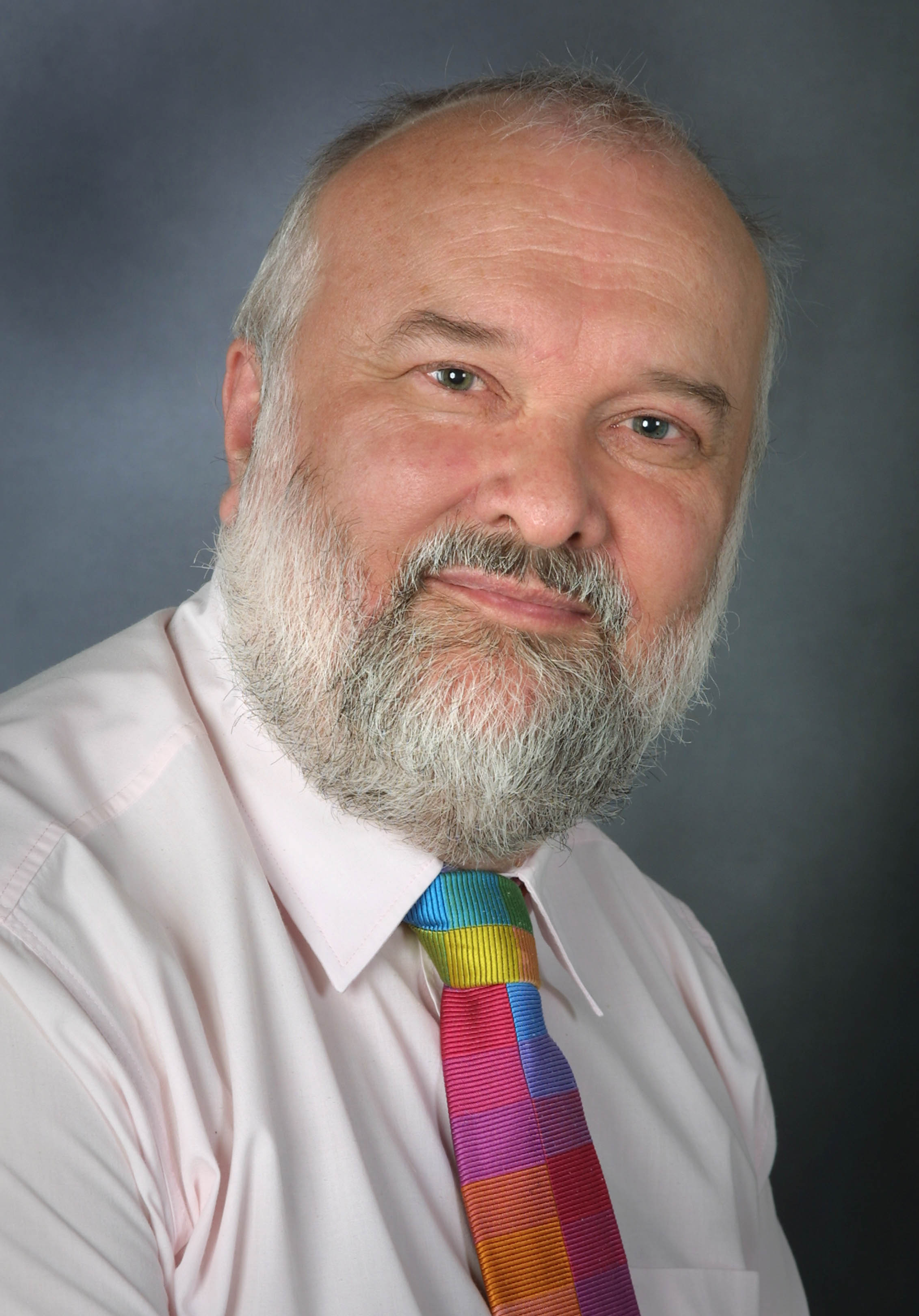
- Born: Henry Stephen Rzepa; June 1950 (age 76)
- Education: Imperial College London (PhD)
- Awards: Herman Skolnik Award (2012)
- Scientific career
- Fields: Chemistry
- Workplaces: Imperial College London; University of Texas at Austin
- Thesis: Hydrogen Transfer Reactions of Indoles (1974)
- Website: rzepa.net; imperial.ac.uk/people/h.rzepa

Henry Stephen Rzepa (born 1950) is a chemist and Emeritus Professor of Computational Chemistry at Imperial College London.

== Education ==
Rzepa was born in 1950 and was educated at Wandsworth Comprehensive School in London. He then entered the chemistry department at Imperial College London where he graduated in 1971. He stayed to do a Ph.D. on the physical organic chemistry of indoles supervised by Brian Challis.

== Career and research ==
After spending three years doing postdoctoral research at University of Texas at Austin, Texas with Michael Dewar in the emerging field of computational chemistry, he returned to Imperial College and was eventually appointed as Professor of the college in 2003. As of 2017 he is Emeritus Professor of Computational Chemistry.

His research interests directed towards combining different types of chemical information tools for solving structural, mechanistic and stereochemical problems in organic, bioorganic, organometallic chemistry and catalysis, using techniques such as semiempirical molecular orbital methods (the MNDO family), Nuclear Magnetic Resonance (NMR) spectroscopy, X-ray crystallography and ab initio quantum theories. Aware of the complex semantic issues involved in converging different areas of chemistry to address modern multidisciplinary problems, he started investigating the use of the Internet as an information and integrating medium around 1987, focusing in 1994 on the World Wide Web as having the most potential. Peter Murray-Rust and he first introduced Chemical Markup Language (CML) in 1995 as a rich carrier of semantic chemical information and data; and they coined the term Datument as a portmanteau word to better express the evolution from the documents produced by traditional academic publishing methods to the Semantic Web ideals expressed by Tim Berners-Lee.

His contributions to chemistry include exploration of Möbius aromaticity, highlighted by the theoretical discovery of relatively stable forms of cyclic conjugated molecules which exhibit two and higher half-twists in the topology rather than just the single twist associated with Mobius systems. He is responsible for unraveling the mechanistic origins of stereocontrol in a variety of catalytic polymerisation reactions, including that of lactide to polylactide, a new generation of bio-sustainable polymer not dependent on oil. He is also known for the integration of chemistry (in the form of CML) with emergent Internet technologies and trends such as RSS and podcasting, for the introduction of the Chemical MIME types in 1994, and for organizing the ECTOC online conferences in organic chemistry, which ran from 1995 to 1998.

=== Awards and honours ===
Rzepa was awarded the Herman Skolnik Award in 2012 by the American Chemical Society.
