= Kimito Funatsu =

Japanese academic

- 船津 公人 (Funatsu Kimito)
- Born: December 3, 1955
- Education: Kyushu University
- Known for: Chemoinformatics; Data-driven chemistry
- Awards: Herman Skolnik Award (2019); Chemical Society of Japan Award for Creative Work (2020)
- Scientific career
- Fields: Chemistry
- Workplaces: University of Tokyo; NAIST; Toyohashi Tech
- Thesis: Deuterium isotope effects in solvolysis reactions (1983)

Kimito Funatsu (船津 公人, Funatsu Kimito; born December 3, 1955) is a Japanese chemist specializing in chemoinformatics and data-driven chemistry, a professor emeritus at University of Tokyo, and the research director of the Data Science Center at Nara Institute of Science and Technology.

== Biography ==
He graduated from Kagoshima Prefectural Konan High School in 1974 and from Department of Chemistry, School of Science, Kyushu University in 1978. He completed Department of Chemistry, Graduate School of Science, Kyushu University and obtained a doctorate in science in 1983. After he served as an associate professor at Toyohashi University of Technology, he became a professor at Department of Chemical System Engineering, School of Engineering, University of Tokyo in 2004. He concurrently holds the posts of a professor and the research director of the Data Science Center at Nara Institute of Science and Technology from 2017. He was also invited as visiting professor at University of Strasbourg in France in 2011.

The Division of Chemical Information of the American Chemical Society gave him the Herman Skolnik Award in 2019 for his contributions to structure elucidation, de novo structure generation and applications of cheminformatics methods to materials design and chemical process control. He also received the Chemical Society of Japan Award for Creative Work (日本化学会 学術賞) for 2020. In 2021, he retired from University of Tokyo at mandatory age and was given the title of professor emeritus.
