= Table of permselectivity for different substances =

This is a table of permselectivity for different substances in the glomerulus of the kidney in renal filtration.

Substance	Approximate molecular mass (g/mol)	Effective molecular radius (nm)	conc. in ultrafiltrate / conc. in blood plasma
sodium	23	0.1	1.0
potassium	39	0.14	1.0
chloride	35.5	0.18	1.0
water	18	0.15	1.0
urea	60	0.16	1.0
glucose	180	0.33	1.0
sucrose	342	0.44	1.0
polyethylene glycol	1,000	0.70	1.0
inulin	5,200	1.48	0.98
lysozyme	14,600	1.90	0.8
myoglobin	16,900	1.88	0.75
lactoglobulin	36,000	2.16	0.4
egg albumin	43,500	2.80	0.22
Bence Jones protein	44,000	2.77	1.0
hemoglobin	68,000	3.25	0.03
serum albumin	69,000	3.55	<0.01
