= Michael Skolnik =

Michael Skolnik may refer to:

- Michael Skolnik, a Colorado nursing student whose death from surgical complications led to the passage of the Michael Skolnik Medical Transparency Act in 2007
- Michael Skolnik, a filmmaker and activist most noted for his documentary film Without the King
