= Yvonne Connolly Martin =

American researcher

- Born: September 13, 1936
- Education: Carleton College, Northwestern University
- Spouse: William Brady Martin
- Scientific career
- Fields: Computational chemistry
- Workplaces: Abbott Laboratories

Yvonne Connolly Martin (born September 13, 1936) is an American cheminformatics and computer-aided drug design expert who rose to the rank of Senior Volwiler Research Fellow at Abbott Laboratories (now AbbVie). Trained in chemistry at Northwestern University, she became a leader in collaborative science aimed at discovering and developing bioactive molecules as therapeutic agents, with her contributions proceeding from application of methods to understand how descriptors of molecular shapes and physicochemical properties relate to their biological activity. She is the author of a seminal volume in cheminformatics, Quantitative Drug Design (2nd Ed., 2010), and has been the recipient of numerous awards in her field, including being named as a fellow of the American Association for the Advancement of Science (1985) and of the International Union of Pure and Applied Chemistry (2000), and receiving the Herman Skolnik Award (2009) and the Award for Computers in Chemical and Pharmaceutical Research (2017) from the American Chemical Society.

== Early life and education ==
Yvonne Connolly was born to Irene and Elvert Connolly in 1936.

Martin received a bachelor's degree in 1958 from Carleton College, Northfield, Minnesota. She was the only woman to be a chemistry/zoology major in her year. From 1958 to 1960 she worked as a pharmacology assistant at Abbott Labs. She was awarded a predoctoral fellowship from the National Science Foundation for the years 1960–1963, attending Northwestern University, Evanston, Illinois. She received her Ph.D. in physical biochemistry from Northwestern University in 1964.

== Career ==
External videos
- "Tautomers: A Rant", Yvonne Martin, 2009, ChemAxon

Martin's career has been almost exclusively with the division of Abbott Laboratories that was involved with preclinical drug discovery initiatives, a division that was spun off from that biomedical conglomerate to become the standalone pharmaceutical company, AbbVie. Martin's career at Abbott and AbbVie extended over forty years, interrupted only a sabbatical year, 1967 to 1968, that she spent working with QSAR pioneer Corwin Hansch at Pomona College, after which she returned to Abbott Laboratories. Martin formally retired as a senior research fellow in 2006, but has continued to be associated with Abbott Laboratories on a contract basis, working on topics in which she is interested. She has also taught as a visiting professor at the University of Virginia.

== Research interests ==
Martin's work with Corwin Hansch led to her ongoing work in QSAR, using computers to develop both 2D and 3D models capturing the chemical and biological properties of molecules. As an early proponent of computational chemistry and its use in drug design, she developed combinatorial chemistry and molecular graphics techniques and was involved in the development of software packages for pharmacophore analysis such as DISCO and ALADDIN. Her work has directly affected modern day drug discovery and supported the computer design of novel compounds. Martin has particularly focused on identifying properties of molecules relevant to biological activity, including their potency, binding affinity, and ADME properties. Her methods have been applied to the study of diseases including hypertension, Parkinson's disease, ulcers, bacterial infections, arthritis, and angina.

She has also significantly contributed to the development of compound collections and combinatorial libraries which investigators can use to develop and compare measures of molecular similarity and diversity. Her collection of MAO (monoamine oxidase) inhibitors has been widely used by researchers.

== Other activities ==
In 1989 Martin helped to found the International Quantitative Structure Activity Relationship & Modeling Society (now called the QSAR, Chemoinformatics and Modeling Society). She served as a board member and was chair of the organization from 2001 to 2005.

== Published works ==
In addition to more than a hundred scholarly publications, she has written or edited six books. These include her textbook on Quantitative Drug Design. Editorially, she has worked on Perspectives in Drug Design and Discovery, QSAR: Annual Reports in Computational Chemistry, Journal of Computer-Aided Drug Design and QSAR & Combinatorial Science. She has registered eight patents. She is listed in the World directory of crystallographers : and of other scientists employing crystallographic methods.

== Awards and honors ==
- 2024, Alfred Burger Award in Medicinal Chemistry from the American Chemical Society
- 2017, Award for Computers in Chemical and Pharmaceutical Research from the American Chemical Society
- 2013, Alumni Association Award from Carleton College
- 2009, Herman Skolnik Award from the American Chemical Society
- 2005, Society for Biomolecular Screening Accomplishment Award
- 2000, fellow, International Union of Pure and Applied Chemistry (IUPAC)
- 1985, fellow, American Association for the Advancement of Science (AAAS)
- Lifetime member of the Molecular Modeling and Graphics Society (MMGS)
- American Crystallographic Association (ACA)

== Personal life ==
Martin is married to William Brady Martin, a professor of chemistry at Lake Forest College in Lake Forest, Illinois, and has two children.
