= Feodor Theilheimer =

German mathematician

- Born: June 18, 1909; Gunzenhausen, Germany
- Died: December 24, 2000 (aged 91); Chevy Chase, Montgomery County, Maryland, US
- Spouse: Henriette Rubel
- Children: Rachel Theilheimer
- Scientific career
- Thesis: Ein Beitrag zur Theorie der charakteristischen Invarianten (A contribution to the theory of characteristic invariants) (1936)
- Doctoral advisor: Issai Schur

Feodor Theilheimer (1909–2000) was a German mathematician who studied mathematics and physics at the University of Erlangen. He lectured in mathematics at Trinity College and worked for the U.S. Department of Defense on the research and development of ship design and construction.

== Early life and career ==
Theilheimer was born in Gunzenhausen, Germany on 18 June 1909, the youngest of six children, to Gustav Theilheimer and Rosa Theilheimer (née Waldmann). Gustav was a cattle dealer and hops buyer for breweries. Feodor went to Realschule in Gunzenhausen and Oberrealschule in Nuremberg.

He attended the University of Erlangen where he studied mathematics and physics. From 1928 to 1931 he studied at the Telshe Yeshiva in Lithuania. In 1931 he attended the Hildesheimer Rabbinical Seminary in Berlin.

In 1932 he started studying mathematics at the Friedrich-Wilhelms University of Berlin and received his PhD in 1936 with the thesis Ein Beitrag zur Theorie der charakteristischen Invarianten (A contribution to the theory of characteristic invariants). He was one of the last Jews to graduate from that university. Some of the mathematicians working in Berlin while Theilheimer was there were Ludwig Bieberbach, Alfred Brauer, Georg Feigl, Erhard Schmidt, Richard von Mises, and Issai Schur, his thesis advisor.

He taught in Berlin for one year but as it became increasingly difficult to teach as a Jew in Germany under the Nazi regime, he emigrated to the USA in 1937. In the USA it was difficult to find work as a German immigrant and from 1937 to 1941 he tutored Jewish refugees in St Louis.

In 1941 he joined Brown University and lectured a course entitled Program of Advanced Research and Instruction in Mechanics. In 1942 he was appointed lecturer in mathematics at Trinity College and was promoted to assistant professor in 1946.

In 1948 he moved to Washington, DC where he worked for the U.S. Department of Defense as a mathematician on the research and development of ship design and construction.

Theilheimer attended several meetings of the Mathematical Association of America over the period 1947 to 1955 and presented papers at these meetings.

== Works ==
He completed his thesis on invariant theory in 1936 despite the challenges of being a non-Aryan. Most of his later career was in aerodynamics and ship modeling for example on the use of high speed computers to ease the drawing of ship lines. For this work he received the David W Taylor Award for Scientific Achievement. He worked on Fast Fourier transform algorithms and how to quickly factor matrices to a product of zeros.

== Private life ==
In 1948 Theilheimer married Henriette "Henny" Rubel and they had one daughter, Rachel born in 1950 in Silver Spring, Maryland. They lived in Chevy Chase, Maryland.

Theilheimer retired in 1977 but still taught mathematics courses at the University of Maryland until 1983. Theilheimer died on 24 December 2000 in Chevy Chase. His wife then moved to New York where she died in 2013.

== Selected publications ==
- Theilheimer, F (1942) Swept-back wings with arbitrary lift distribution, Journal of Aeronautical Science
- Theilheimer, F (1943 The influence of sweep on the spanwise lift distribution of wings, Journal of Aeronautical Science
- Theilheimer, F & Starkweather, W (1961) The fairing of ship lines on a high-speed computer
- Theilheimer, F (1969) Matrix Version of the Fast Fourier Transform, IEEE Transactions on Audio and Electroacoustics

== Awards and memberships ==
- First David W. Taylor Award for Scientific Achievement (1961) – shared with Pao C. Pien.
- Full membership of Sigma Xi, The Scientific Research Society (1975)
- Member of the American Mathematical Society
- Member of the Mathematical Association of America
- Member of the Society for Industrial and Applied Mathematics
- Member of the Association for Computing Machinery
