= Herman Skolnik =

Herman Skolnik (1914-December 229, 1994) was the American chemist, the namesake of the Herman Skolnik Award.

He was an employer of Hercules Incorporated during 1942-1979. Afterwards he was writing, lecturing and teaching.

Skolnik was the recipient of ACS Patterson Award in 1969.
