= William Theilheimer =

German chemist (1914–2005)

William Theilheimer (1914 – 14 July 2005), who was born in Augsburg, Germany, played a significant role in the history of what is now known as chemoinformatics.

== Life ==
He received his Ph.D. in organic chemistry from Basel University, Switzerland in 1940. Being Jewish, Basel provided a safe haven for him during the Second World War and he stayed there until 1947 as Assistant to Professor Hans Friedrich Albrecht Erlenmeyer (1900 - 1967), the son of Friedrich Gustav Carl Emil Erlenmeyer (Emil Jr.) and grandson of Richard August Carl Emil Erlenmeyer (Emil Sr.). During his time there he compiled the data for the first two volumes of "Synthetische Methoden der Organische Chemie" published by S. Karger Verlag in Basel in 1946 and 1948. These built on the system of Conrad Weygand (Organic Preparations, Interscience Publishers, Inc., New York, 1945) for grouping similar reactions together, but used "Theilheimer reaction symbols" that summarised the most significant bond formed, the reaction type (addition reaction, rearrangement reaction, exchange reaction/substitution reaction or elimination reaction), and the bond broken or fragment lost, as well as a specific reagent order based on the periodic table.

Later volumes were sponsored by a number of American chemical and pharmaceutical firms, most notably Hoffmann-LaRoche, Inc., who provided library facilities at their site in Nutley, New Jersey from 1948 up to (and after) Theilheimer's retirement in 1981.

His books were developed as modern chemical reaction databases in the 1980s by MDL (Molecular Design Limited) and ORAC (Organic Reactions Accessed by Computer); both of these companies were taken over by Robert Maxwell's Maxwell Communications Corporation.

Theilheimer received the Herman Skolnik Award of the ACS Division of Chemical Information in 1987.
