= Alfred Gilman Sr. =

American pharmacologist (1908–1984)

Alfred Gilman
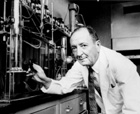
- Born: February 5, 1908; Bridgeport, Connecticut
- Died: January 13, 1984 (aged 75); New Haven, Connecticut
- Education: Yale University (B.S., Ph.D.)
- Known for: Experimental chemotherapy; The Pharmacological Basis of Therapeutics
- Spouse: Mabel Schmidt
- Children: Joanna Gilman; Alfred G. Gilman
- Awards: National Academy of Sciences (1964)
- Scientific career
- Fields: Pharmacology
- Workplaces: Yale School of Medicine; Columbia College of Physicians and Surgeons; Albert Einstein College of Medicine; Chairman of Pharmacology and Dean of the UT Southwestern Medical School
- Thesis: Chemical and Physiological Investigations on Canine Gastric Secretion (1934)
- Academic advisors: George R. Cowgill

Alfred Zack Gilman (February 5, 1908 – January 13, 1984) was an American pharmacologist best known for pioneering early chemotherapy techniques using nitrogen mustard with his colleague, Louis S. Goodman. The pair also published the classic textbook The Pharmacological Basis of Therapeutics in 1941, and Gilman served as an editor for its first six editions. Gilman served on the faculties of the Yale School of Medicine, the Columbia College of Physicians and Surgeons, and the Albert Einstein College of Medicine, where he founded the Department of Pharmacology. He was a member of U.S. National Academy of Sciences.

== Life and career ==
Gilman was born February 5, 1908, in Bridgeport, Connecticut, to Joseph Gilman and Rebecca Ives Gilman. Joseph Gilman owned a music store in Bridgeport, and his son learned to play several musical instruments. Unlike his father, however, Alfred Gilman turned to science, receiving a bachelor's degree from Yale College in 1928 and Ph.D. in Physiological Chemistry from Yale in 1931 for a dissertation entitled "Chemical and Physiological Investigations on Canine Gastric Secretion." He then joined of the Department of Pharmacology at the Yale School of Medicine as a postdoctoral fellow, where he and Louis S. Goodman, a young M.D., became colleagues and close friends. In 1934, a year before joining the Yale faculty as an assistant professor, he married Mabel Schmidt. Their daughter, Joanna, was born in 1938, and their son, Alfred Goodman Gilman, in 1941. The younger Alfred Gilman, whose middle name was taken from Louis Goodman, followed his father into pharmacology and was awarded the 1994 Nobel Prize in Medicine and Physiology.

While teaching together, Goodman and Gilman perceived a need for an updated textbook in pharmacology that reflected advances in medicine and clarified the linkages between pharmacodynamics and pharmacotherapy. With assistance from Mabel, the text was first published in 1941 by the Macmillan Publishing Company as The Pharmacological Basis of Therapeutics, and Gilman remained a senior editor for its first six editions. The seventh was released shortly after his death.

Shortly after publishing the first edition of his textbook, Gilman became section chief of pharmacology at the US Army's Edgewood Arsenal. Still affiliated with Yale, where Dean Milton C. Winternitz had recently signed a government contract with the Office of Scientific Research and Development to investigate agents of chemical warfare, Gilman and Goodman were assigned a study of nitrogen mustard. Interested in bone marrow depletion effects of mustard gas discovered by Edward and Helen Krumbhaar during World War I, Gilman and Goodman conducted trials on mice to research on the compounds' cytotoxic properties for white blood cells. In August 1942, only a few months after their initial experiments, they began trials on a patient of thoracic surgeon Gustaf Lindskog whose lymphosarcoma had not responded to radiation therapy. Although the intravenous nitrogen mustard regimen caused the tumor to completely recede, it regenerated within a month, and the patient died several months later. A larger clinical trial followed, and a paper was released after the studies were declassified in 1946. Gilman and Goodman are credited with the first use of intravenous chemotherapy treatment.

After leaving his Army post in 1946, Gilman joined the faculty of Columbia's College of Physicians and Surgeons and moved to White Plains, New York, then became the chairman of the new Department of Pharmacology at the Albert Einstein College of Medicine in 1956. During this period, Gilman shifted his focus to diuretics and kidney function. Gilman returned to Yale in 1973, where he remained as a lecturer until his death. He died at home in New Haven in 1984.

== Awards and honors ==
Gilman was elected to the National Academy of Sciences in 1964 and chaired its Drug Efficacy Review Committee. He received an honorary doctorate from Dartmouth College in 1979.

== See also ==
- History of cancer chemotherapy
