= Shkolnik =

Shkolnik (also Shkolnick or Schkolnick) is an Ashkenazi Jewish surname originating in Russian Empire (Школьник) and literally meaning "school student" in Russian. Notable people with the surname include:

- Iosif Shkolnik (1883–1926), Russian painter
- Leonid Shkolnick (born 1945), Ukrainian scientist and engineer
- Levi Yitzhak Shkolnik, birth name of Levi Eshkol (1895–1969), prime minister of Israel
- Mariya Shkolnik (1882–1955), Russian Communist activist
- Meyer Robert Schkolnick, birth name of Robert K. Merton (1910–2003), American sociologist
- Vladimir Shkolnik (born 1949), Kazakh politician

== See also ==
- Skolnick
