= Peter Murray-Rust =

Chemist and open-access research activist

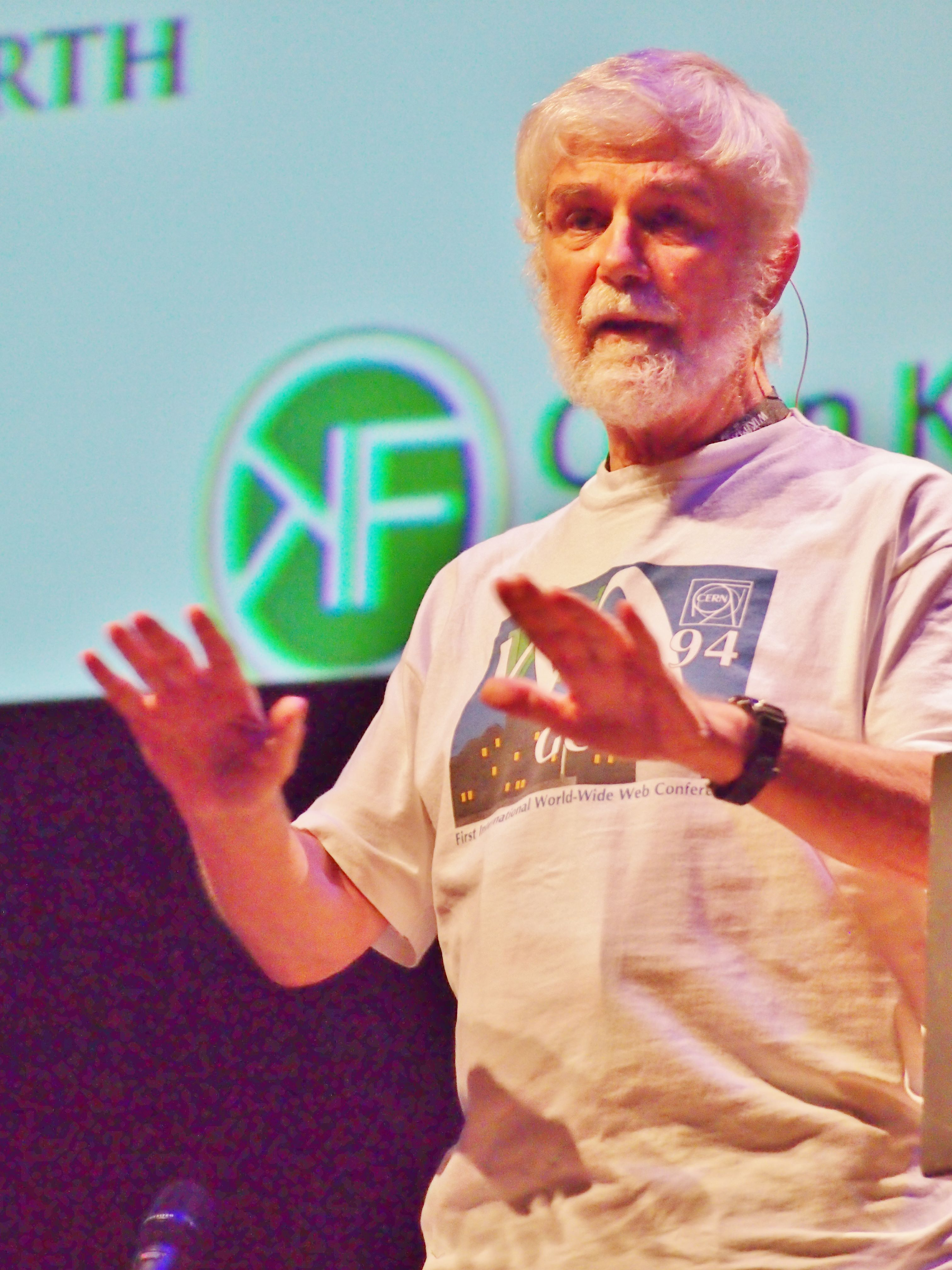
- at Wikimania 2014
- Born: 1941 (age 84–85); Guildford, England
- Education: Balliol College, Oxford
- Known for: Blue Obelisk; Chemical Markup Language
- Awards: Herman Skolnik Award
- Scientific career
- Fields: Chemistry; Cheminformatics
- Workplaces: University of Cambridge; University of Oxford; University of Stirling; University of Nottingham; Glaxo
- Thesis: A structural investigation of some compounds showing charge-transfer properties (1969)
- Peter Murray-Rust's voice recorded July 2014
- Website: www-pmr.ch.cam.ac.uk

Peter Murray-Rust is a chemist currently working at the University of Cambridge. As well as his work in chemistry, Murray-Rust is also known for his support of open access and open data.

== Education ==
He was educated at Bootham School, a private school in York, and at Balliol College, Oxford. After obtaining a Doctor of Philosophy with a thesis entitled A structural investigation of some compounds showing charge-transfer properties, he became lecturer in chemistry at the (new) University of Stirling and was first warden of Andrew Stewart Hall of Residence. In 1982, he moved to Glaxo Group Research at Greenford to head Molecular Graphics, Computational Chemistry and later protein structure determination. He was Professor of Pharmacy in the University of Nottingham from 1996 to 2000, setting up the Virtual School of Molecular Sciences. He is now Reader Emeritus in Molecular Informatics at the University of Cambridge and Senior Research Fellow Emeritus at Churchill College, Cambridge.

== Research ==
His research interests have involved the automated analysis of data in scientific publications, creation of virtual communities, e.g. The Virtual School of Natural Sciences in the Globewide Network Academy, and the Semantic Web. With Henry Rzepa, he has extended this to chemistry through the development of markup languages, especially Chemical Markup Language. He campaigns for open data, particularly in science, and is on the advisory board of the Open Knowledge International and a co-author of the Panton Principles for Open scientific data. Together with a few other chemists, he was a founder member of the Blue Obelisk movement in 2005.

In 2002, Peter Murray-Rust and his colleagues proposed an electronic repository for unpublished chemical data called the World Wide Molecular Matrix (WWMM). In January 2011, a symposium around his career and visions was organized, called Visions of a Semantic Molecular Future. In 2011, he and Henry Rzepa were joint recipients of the Herman Skolnik Award of the American Chemical Society. In 2014, he was awarded a Fellowship by the Shuttleworth Foundation to develop the automated mining of science from the literature.

In 2009 Murray-Rust coined the term "Doctor Who" model for the phenomenon exhibited by the Blue Obelisk project and other Open Science projects, where when a project leader does not have the resources to continue to lead a project (e.g. because he or she has moved to another university with other tasks), someone else will stand up to become the new leader and continue the project. This is a reference to the long-running British science fiction television series Doctor Who, in which the main character periodically regenerates into a different form, which is played by a different actor.

As of 2014, Murray-Rust was granted a Fellowship by Shuttleworth Foundation in relation to the ContentMine project which uses machines to liberate 100,000,000 facts from the scientific literature.

In recent years, Murray-Rust has been active in the #semanticClimate project, which focuses on semantifying climate data, IPPC reports, and generally making climate knowledge open and machine readable and actionable.

== Activism ==
Murray-Rust is also known for his work on making scientific knowledge from literature freely available, and in such taking a stance against publishers that are not fully compliant with the Berlin Declaration on Open Access. In 2014, he actively raised awareness of glitches in the publishing system of Elsevier, where restrictions were imposed by Elsevier on the reuse of papers after the authors had paid Elsevier to make the paper freely available.
