= Louis S. Goodman =

American pharmacologist

Louis Goodman
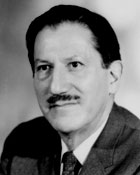
- Born: August 27, 1906; Portland, Oregon
- Died: November 19, 2000 (aged 94); Salt Lake City, Utah
- Education: Reed College (B.S.); University of Oregon (M.D.)
- Known for: Experimental chemotherapy; The Pharmacological Basis of Therapeutics
- Spouse: Helen Ricen (1906–1996)
- Children: Carolyn, Debora
- Awards: National Academy of Sciences (1965)
- Scientific career
- Fields: Pharmacology
- Workplaces: Yale School of Medicine; University of Vermont; University of Utah

Louis Sanford Goodman (August 27, 1906 – November 19, 2000) was an American pharmacologist. He is best known for his collaborations with Alfred Gilman, Sr., with whom he authored the popular textbook The Pharmacological Basis of Therapeutics in 1941 and pioneered the first chemotherapy trials using nitrogen mustard.

== Life and career ==
Goodman was born in Portland, Oregon in 1906 and received his B.A. from Reed College in 1928 and an M.D. from the University of Oregon Medical School in 1932. After interning at Johns Hopkins Hospital, he joined the Yale School of Medicine faculty, where he met Alfred Gilman. They began teaching pharmacology courses together and began to develop a textbook, which was published as The Pharmacological Basis of Therapeutics in 1941.

While at Yale, Goodman and Gilman were assigned a government contract in nitrogen mustard research in 1942. With knowledge that the compound depleted white blood cells, the pharmacologists experimented with intravenous injections on a terminally ill lymphosarcoma patient in Gustaf Lindskog's care. Though the tumor regenerated and killed the patient, the drug's success in briefly eliminating the tumor is considered a historic accomplishment in chemotherapy treatment, and the compound is still used as a chemotherapeutic agent.

Goodman was appointed an assistant professor at the University of Vermont in 1937, and became its chair of pharmacology and physiology in 1943. Then, in 1944, he moved to Salt Lake City to found a department of pharmacology at the University of Utah College of Medicine. There, Goodman demonstrated that the paralysis induced by curare was temporary, which he did by injecting a colleague with the relaxant.

Goodman retired in 1971 and remained in Salt Lake City for the remainder of his life, continuing to teach at the College of Medicine. He died on November 19, 2000, at the age of 94.

== Personal life ==
Goodman married Helen Ricen in 1934, and they had two daughters, Carolyn and Debora. He is survived by his grandchildren, Jonathan, Rebecca, Miriam and Jacob and great-grandson Leo Goodman Liggins and great-grandchild Maya Josephine Henrickson.

== Awards and honors ==
Goodman was elected to the National Academy of Sciences in 1965.
