= Gustaf Lindskog =

American thoracic surgeon (1903–2002)

Gustaf Elmer Lindskog (7 February 1903 – 4 August 2002) was a thoracic surgeon and the William H. Carmalt Professor of Surgery and chair of surgery at the Yale School of Medicine, best known for having participated in the first pharmaceutical treatment of cancer.

== Biography ==
Lindskog was born in Boston, Massachusetts in 1903. He received his B.Sc. degree from the Massachusetts Agricultural College in 1923 and his M.D. degree from Harvard Medical School in 1928, then served for four years as a lieutenant commander in the Medical Corps of the United States Navy during World War II.

== Bibliography ==
- Thoracic and Cardiovascular Surgery & Related Pathology with Averill Liebow and William Glenn (1953, 1962, 1975)
