= Goodman & Gilman's The Pharmacological Basis of Therapeutics =

1941 pharmacology textbook by Louis S. Goodman and Alfred Gilman

- Author: Louis S. Goodman and Alfred Gilman
- Publication date: 1941

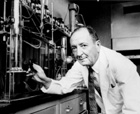
Alfred Gilman

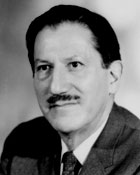
Louis S. Goodman

Goodman & Gilman's The Pharmacological Basis of Therapeutics, commonly referred to as the Blue Bible or Goodman & Gilman, is a textbook of pharmacology originally authored by Louis S. Goodman and Alfred Gilman. First published in 1941, the book is in its 14th edition (as of 2022), and has the reputation of being the "bible of pharmacology". The readership of this book include physicians of all therapeutic and surgical specialties, clinical pharmacologists, clinical research professionals and pharmacists.

While teaching jointly in the Yale School of Medicine's Department of Pharmacology, Goodman and Gilman began developing a course textbook that emphasized relationships between pharmacodynamics and pharmacotherapy, introduced recent pharmacological advances like sulfa drugs, and discussed the history of drug development. Yale physiologist John Farquhar Fulton encouraged them to publish the work for a broader audience and introduced them to a publisher at the Macmillan Publishing Company. Their new text was first published in 1941 under the title The Pharmacological Basis of Therapeutics: A Textbook of Pharmacology, Toxicology and Therapeutics for Physicians and Medical Student. Because the volume was twice as long as a typical textbook, Macmillan printed few copies, but demand for a readable, up-to-date pharmacological text proved high, and several printings followed.

Although rapid pharmacological innovations were made in the years immediately following—including the introduction of chemotherapy, steroids, antibiotics, and antihistamines—a second edition could not be completed until 1955 because of the authors' service in World War II. Thereafter, the text was revised every five years in collaboration with a large number of specialist coauthors.

Gilman and Goodman remained the book's lead editors for the first five editions; Gilman remained an editor through the sixth edition, and Goodman through the seventh, which was published shortly after Gilman's death in 1984. Alfred Goodman Gilman, the son of Alfred Gilman and winner of the 1994 Nobel Prize in Medicine and Physiology, joined as senior editor for the book's sixth, seventh, and eighth editions, and a contributing editor to the ninth and tenth. Goodman died in 2000, and Goodman Gilman in December 2015.

== Editions ==
=== Editions 1–5 ===
The first five editions were published under the title The Pharmacological Basis of Therapeutics: A Textbook of Pharmacology, Toxicology, and Therapeutics for Physicians and Medical Students.

- 1st: Goodman, Louis S.; Gilman, Alfred (1941). ——. New York: Macmillan Publishing Co. 1387 pp.
- 2nd: Goodman, L. S.; Gilman, A. (1955). —— (2nd ed.). New York: Macmillan. 1831 pp.
- 3rd: Goodman, L. S.; Gilman, Alfred, eds. (1966). —— (3rd ed.). New York: Macmillan. 1785 pp. (London, Toronto: Collier-Macmillan)
- 4th: Goodman, L. S.; Gilman, A., eds. (1971). —— (4th ed.). New York: Macmillan Publishing Co., Inc. 1704 pp. (London, Toronto: Collier-Macmillan; Taipei: Mei-Ya)
- 5th: Goodman, L. S.; Gilman, A., eds. (1975). —— (5th ed.). New York: Macmillan. ISBN 0023447818. 1704 pp. (London, Toronto: Collier-Macmillan)

=== Editions 6 onwards ===
Editions 6 onwards were published under the title Goodman & Gilman's The Pharmacological Basis of Therapeutics.

- 6th: Gilman, Alfred G.; Goodman, L.S.; Gilman, A., eds. (1980). Goodman & Gilman's the Pharmacological Basis of Therapeutics (6th ed.). New York: Macmillan. ISBN 0-07-146891-9. 1843 pp. (London, Toronto: Collier-Macmillan)
- 7th: Gilman, A. G.; Goodman, L. S.; Rall, Theodore W.; Murad, Ferid, eds. (1985). —— (7th ed.). New York: Macmillan. ISBN 0-02-344710-9. 1839 pp.
- 8th: Gilman, A. G.; Rall, T. W.; Nies, Alan S.; Taylor, Palmer, eds. (1990). —— (8th ed.). New York: Pergamon Press. ISBN 0-08-040296-8. 1811 pp. (Oxford, Beijing: Pergamon)
- 9th: Hardman, Joel G.; Limburd, L. E.; Molinoff, Perry B.; Ruddon, Raymond W.; Gilman, A. G., eds. (1996). —— (9th ed.). New York: McGraw-Hill. ISBN 0-07-026266-7. 1905 pp. (Beijing: People's Medical Publishing House)
- 10th: Hardman, J. G.; Limburd, L. E.; Gilman, A. G., eds. (2000). —— (10th ed.). New York: McGraw-Hill. ISBN 0-07-135469-7. 2045 pp. (Beijing: People's Medical Publishing House)
- 11th: Brunton, Laurence L.; Lazo, John S.; Parker, Keith, eds. (2005). —— (11th ed.). New York: McGraw-Hill. ISBN 0-07-142280-3. 2021 pp.
- 12th: Brunton, L. L.; Chabner, Bruce; Knollmann, Björn C., eds. (2011). —— (12th ed.). New York: McGraw-Hill. ISBN 978-0-07-162442-8. 2084 pp.
- 13th: Brunton, Laurence L.; Hilal-Dandan, Randa; Knollmann, Björn C., eds. (2017). —— (13th ed.). New York: McGraw-Hill. ISBN 978-1259584732. 1440 pp.
- 14th: Brunton, Laurence L.; Knollmann, Björn C., eds. (2022). —— (14th ed.). New York: McGraw-Hill. ISBN 978-1264258079. 1664 pp.

== Reviews ==
There have been many published book reviews of this widely used textbook. The first edition reviewer was highly enthusiastic and said that he was “delirious in his appraisal of the book”, that it was an “amazing work”, and “the product of enormous industry and keen insight”. A reviewer of the eighteen-hundred page second-edition described it as encyclopedic, indispensable, and as an excellent resource for students. The fourth edition reviewer noted that “all other related books seem to pale by comparison”.

The 6th edition published in 1980 was praised for the extensive bibliography, but also noted that, although “this book is recommended to all those who prescribe drugs”, it had become “too large to be used by medical students as a routine textbook”. The ninth edition was designated as the "blue bible of pharmacology" and as the gold standard.

The 12th edition was criticized for only one-ninth of authors being female. However, this had increased to one-fifth of the authors being female in the thirteenth edition.

A policy of the editors has been to not disclose the potential conflicts of interest by the authors. The 12th edition authors were the recipients of over one-hundred and thirty patents. The thirteenth edition authors received three-million dollars from pharmaceutical companies which was undisclosed.

Unlike earlier editions which were praised for being up to date, an analysis of the 13th edition found that the citations were older than those of other pharmacology textbooks. A team of the reviewers for the 2018 edition were more measured than those of earlier editions.
