= Michael Skolnik Medical Transparency Act =

Colorado legislation for healthcare professional transparency

The Michael Skolnik Medical Transparency Act is a state law in the U.S. state of Colorado, initially enacted in 2007 with an extension passed in 2010. The act mandates the disclosure of specific information by healthcare providers to the public. These disclosures include a physician's malpractice history, disciplinary actions, and educational background, thereby allowing patients to make informed decisions regarding their choice of healthcare provider.

== Background ==
The legislation is named in memory of Michael Skolnik, a 22-year-old nursing student who endured fatal complications from a surgical procedure performed by Dr. David Wayne Miller, a neurosurgeon who had previous medical malpractice history. Skolnik's parents asserted that the surgery, to remove a brain cyst, was medically unnecessary, and that they would have chosen a different doctor had they been aware of the neurosurgeon's history. The initial 2007 act solely targeted physicians, requiring them to complete online profiles to provide consumers in Colorado with relevant information about their medical practitioners.

== Expansion ==
The scope of the act was broadened in 2010 when the Colorado legislature passed the Michael Skolnik Medical Transparency Act of 2010. This expansion extended the profiling requirement beyond physicians to 22 additional licensure categories.

== Disclosure requirements ==
Under the act, healthcare providers are required to disclose the following information:

- Educational background and training
- Board certifications and specialties
- Affiliations with healthcare facilities
- Ownership interests in healthcare-related businesses
- Public disciplinary actions
- Malpractice settlements or judgments
- Criminal convictions related to their practice

These disclosures are required during initial licensure and upon renewal, ensuring ongoing transparency. Healthcare providers must submit detailed disclosures to the Division of Professions and Occupations within the Department of Regulatory Agencies (DORA) at the time of initial licensure and update them regularly. Changes, such as malpractice claims, criminal convictions, or disciplinary actions, must be reported within 30 days.
