= Herman Skolnik Award =

The Herman Skolnik Award is awarded annually by the Division of Chemical Information of the American Chemical Society, "to recognize outstanding contributions to and achievements in the theory and practice of chemical information science". As of 2024 the award is of 3,000 US dollars.

It is named for Herman Skolnik (1914-1994), who was a co-founder of the then ACS Division of Chemical Literature in 1948 and a key figure in the Division. The first award was made to him.

== Recipients ==
=== 1970s ===
- 1976: Herman Skolnik
- 1977: Eugene Garfield
- 1978: Fred A. Tate

=== 1980s ===
- 1980: William J. Wiswesser
- 1981: Ben H. Weil
- 1982: Robert Fugmann
- 1983: Russell J. Rowlett, Jr.
- 1984: Montagu Hyams
- 1986: Dale B. Baker
- 1987: William Theilheimer
- 1988: David R. Lide, Jr.
- 1989: Michael F. Lynch and Stuart Marson

=== 1990s ===
- 1990: Ernst Meyer
- 1991: Todd Wipke
- 1992: Jacques-Emile Dubois
- 1993: Peter Willett
- 1994: Alexandru T. Balaban
- 1995: Reiner Luckenbach and Clemens Jochum
- 1996: Milan Randic
- 1997: Johann Gasteiger
- 1998: Gary D. Wiggins
- 1999: Stuart M. Kaback

=== 2000s ===
- 2000: Stephen R. Heller and G. W. A. Milne
- 2001: Guenter Grethe
- 2002: Peter Norton
- 2003: Frank H. Allen
- 2004: Peter Johnson
- 2005: Lorrin Garson
- 2006: Hugo Kubinyi
- 2007: Robert S. Pearlman
- 2008: Gerald M. Maggiora
- 2009: Yvonne Connolly Martin

=== 2010s ===
- 2010: Anton J. Hopfinger
- 2011: Alexander Lawson
- 2012: Peter Murray-Rust and Henry Rzepa
- 2013: Richard D. Cramer
- 2014: Engelbert Zass
- 2015: Jürgen Bajorath
- 2016: Stephen H. Bryant and Evan Bolton
- 2017: David Winkler
- 2018: Gisbert Schneider
- 2019: Kimito Funatsu

=== 2020s ===
- 2020: Wendy A. Warr
- 2023 Patrick Walters
- 2024 Alexandre Varnek
- 2025 Matthias Rarey
- 2026 Antony John Williams

== See also ==
- List of chemistry awards
- List of computer science awards
