= Philosophy of healthcare =

Branch of philosophy

The philosophy of healthcare is the study of the ethics, processes, and people which constitute the maintenance of health for human beings. For the most part, however, the philosophy of healthcare is best approached as an indelible component of human social structures. That is, the societal institution of healthcare can be seen as a necessary phenomenon of human civilization whereby an individual continually seeks to improve, mend, and alter the overall nature and quality of their life. This perennial concern is especially prominent in modern political liberalism, wherein health has been understood as the foundational good necessary for public life.

The philosophy of healthcare is primarily concerned with the following elemental questions:

- Who requires and/or deserves healthcare? Is healthcare a fundamental right of all people?
- What should be the basis for calculating the cost of treatments, hospital stays, drugs, etc.?
- How can healthcare best be administered to the greatest number of people?
- What are the necessary parameters for clinical trials and quality assurance?
- Who, if anybody, can decide when a patient is in need of "comfort measures" (allowing a natural death by providing medications to treat symptoms related to the patient's illness)?

However, the most important question of all is 'what is health?'. Unless this question is addressed any debate about healthcare will be vague and unbounded. For example, what exactly is a health care intervention? What differentiates healthcare from engineering or teaching, for example? Is health care about 'creating autonomy' or acting in people's best interests? Or is it always both? A 'philosophy' of anything requires baseline philosophical questions, as asked, for example, by philosopher David Seedhouse.

The purpose, objective and meaning of healthcare philosophy is to consolidate the information regarding the fields of biotechnology, medicine, and nursing. And seeing that healthcare typically ranks as one of the largest spending areas of governmental budgets, gaining a greater understanding of healthcare is important as not only a social institution, but also as a political one. In addition, healthcare philosophy attempts to highlight the primary movers of healthcare systems including nurses, doctors, allied health professionals, hospital administrators, health insurance companies (HMOs and PPOs), the government (Medicare and Medicaid), and lastly, the patients themselves.

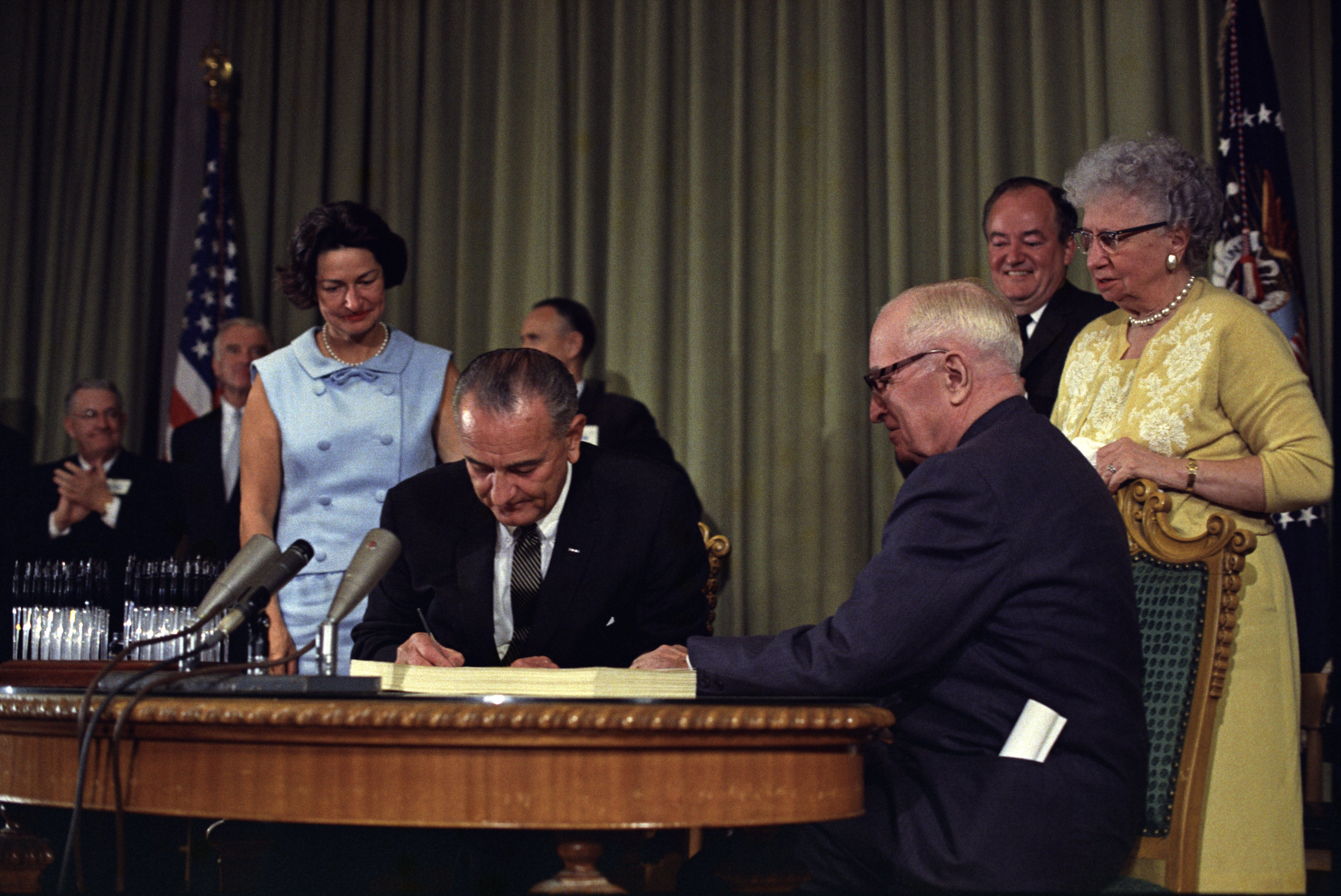
President Johnson signing the U.S. Medicare bill. Harry Truman and his wife, Bess, are on the far right. (1965)

== Ethics of healthcare ==
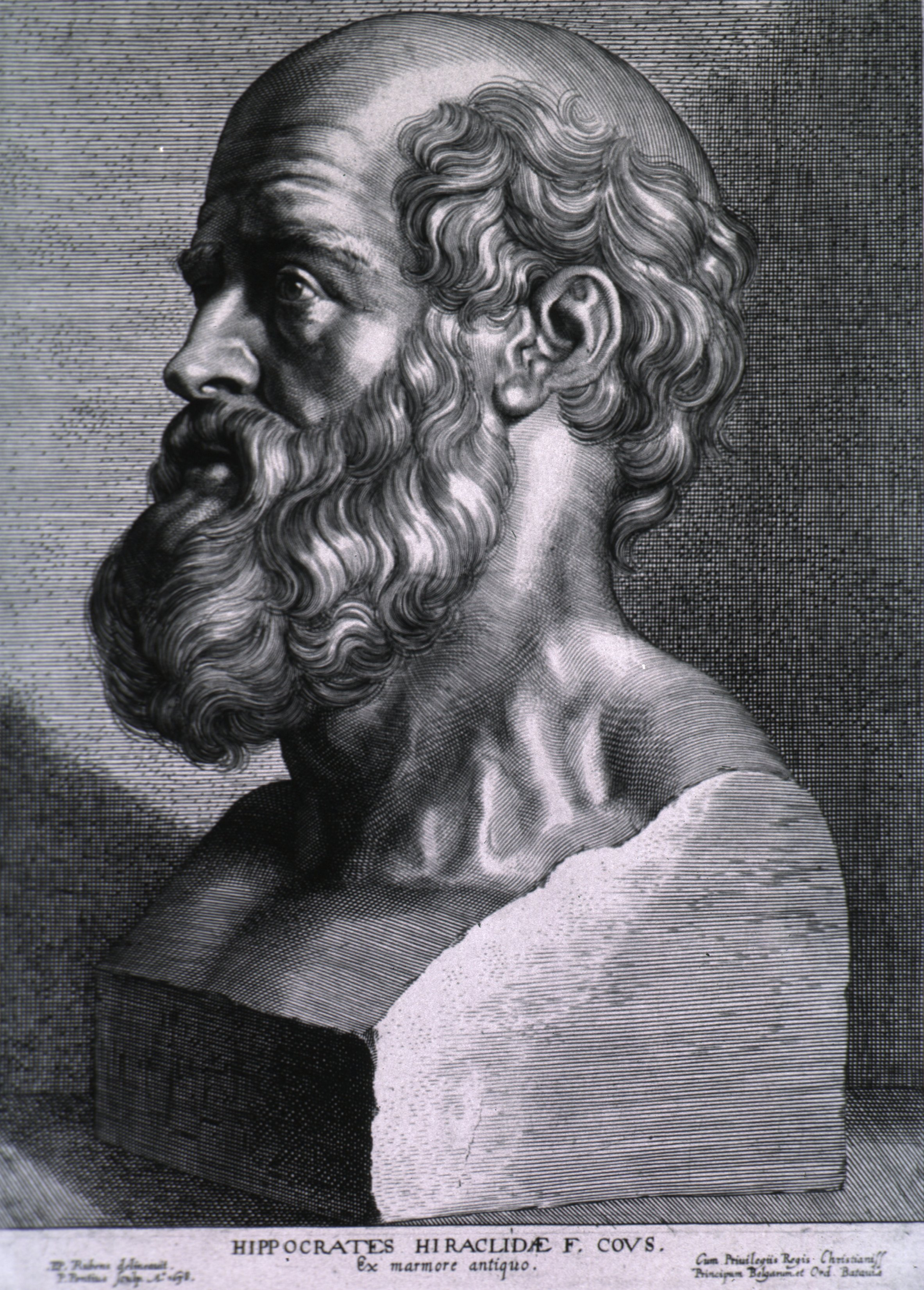
Hippocrates, the ancient Greek physician, considered the father of Western medicine.

The ethical and/or moral premises of healthcare are complex and intricate. To consolidate such a large segment of moral philosophy, it becomes important to focus on what separates healthcare ethics from other forms of morality. And on the whole, it can be said that healthcare itself is a "special" institution within society. With that said, healthcare ought to "be treated differently from other social goods" in a society. It is an institution of which we are all a part whether we like it or not. At some point in every person's life, a decision has to be made regarding one's healthcare. Can they afford it? Do they deserve it? Do they need it? Where should they go to get it? Do they even want it? And it is this last question which poses the biggest dilemma facing a person. After weighing all of the costs and benefits of her healthcare situation, the person has to decide if the costs of healthcare outweigh the benefits. More than basic economic issues are at stake in this conundrum. In fact, a person must decide whether or not their life is ending or if it is worth salvaging. Of course, in instances where the patient is unable to decide due to medical complications, like a coma, then the decision must come from elsewhere. And defining that "elsewhere" has proven to be a very difficult endeavor in healthcare philosophy.

=== Medical ethics ===
Whereas bioethics tends to deal with more broadly based issues like the consecrated nature of the human body and the roles of science and technology in healthcare, medical ethics is specifically focused on applying ethical principles to the field of medicine. Medical ethics has its roots in the writings of Hippocrates, and the practice of medicine was often used as an example in ethical discussions by Plato and Aristotle. As a systematic field, however, it is a large and relatively new area of study in ethics. One of the major premises of medical ethics surrounds "the development of valuational measures of outcomes of health care treatments and programs; these outcome measures are designed to guide health policy and so must be able to be applied to substantial numbers of people, including across or even between whole societies." Terms like beneficence and non-maleficence are vital to the overall understanding of medical ethics. Therefore, it becomes important to acquire a basic grasp of the varying dynamics that go into a doctor-patient relationship.

=== Nursing ethics ===
Like medical ethics, nursing ethics is very narrow in its focus, especially when compared to the expansive field of bioethics. For the most part, "nursing ethics can be defined as having a two-pronged meaning," whereby it is "the examination of all kinds of ethical and bioethical issues from the perspective of nursing theory and practice." This definition, although quite vague, centers on the practical and theoretical approaches to nursing. The American Nurses Association (ANA) endorses an ethical code that emphasizes "values" and "evaluative judgments" in all areas of the nursing profession. The importance of values is being increasingly recognized in all aspects of healthcare and health research. And since moral issues are extremely prevalent throughout nursing, it is important to be able to recognize and critically respond to situations that warrant and/or necessitate an ethical decision. A nurse promotes for and strives to protect the rights, safety, and health of all patients. Although these are clear nursing roles, all health care professionals must work together and collaborate to observe the patient's needs and rights.

=== Business ethics ===
Balancing the cost of care with the quality of care is a major issue in healthcare philosophy. In Canada and some parts of Europe, democratic governments play a major role in determining how much public money from taxation should be directed towards the healthcare process. In the United States and other parts of Europe, private health insurance corporations as well as government agencies are the agents in this precarious life-and-death balancing act. According to medical ethicist Leonard J. Weber, "Good-quality healthcare means cost-effective healthcare," but "more expensive healthcare does not mean higher-quality healthcare" and "certain minimum standards of quality must be met for all patients" regardless of health insurance status. This statement undoubtedly reflects the varying thought processes going into the bigger picture of a healthcare cost-benefit analysis. In order to streamline this tedious process, health maintenance organizations (HMOs) employ large numbers of actuaries (colloquially known as "insurance adjusters") to ascertain the appropriate balance between cost, quality, and necessity in a patient's healthcare plan. A general rule in the health insurance industry is as follows:

The least costly treatment should be provided unless there is substantial evidence that a more costly intervention is likely to yield a superior outcome.

This generalized rule for healthcare institutions "is perhaps one of the best expressions of the practical meaning of stewardship of resources," especially since "the burden of proof is on justifying the more expensive intervention, not the less expensive one, when different acceptable treatment options exist."

=== Religious Ethics ===
The Rod of Asclepius, the ancient Greek god of healing and medicine. This symbol has been adopted by health care organizations on a global scale.

Various forms of religiosity are often tied together with health care, as some practitioners feel an obligation of the divine sort to try and care for others. In ancient Greece, a lack of institutionalized health care made it difficult for society to care for "beggars or mendicants", known as πτωχός. Following the genesis of Judaism and later, Christianity, religious texts supported "special dispensations for economic and political care" for those who were perceived as helpless in largely patriarchal societies. The role of the patriarch at the center of both society at large and the family unit meant that orphans and widows were necessarily among the helpless, and this sentiment was echoed by the Old Testament's conception of the poor, which also included individuals who were lame, blind, and/or prisoners. The mythologizing of Asclepius in Greek and Roman tradition is reflective of the historical transformation of places of worship into sites of health care delivery.

A concept that is fundamental to health care development, grounded in the sacred texts of both the Western and Eastern worlds, is the sanctity of life. From this notion, we are commanded to treat life of all sorts with considerable dignity before we may interfere with it, "giving at least some attention to its nature and purpose." In Western health care, dignity regarding human life can be traced back to imago dei, meaning "image of God", which asserts that human beings are created by God in a manner of resemblance to his own existence. This is to say that health care practitioners shouldn't merely perceive patients/clients to be fellow humans undergoing suffering, but also as unique likenesses of God.

Following the Industrial Revolution, and the advent of the 20th Century, the face of modern medicine has evolved. However, the tensions between health care and religious practices have also grown in recent decades, and has led to some inequalities between the "rights" of the recipients and providers of health care. Legislative action has taken place in order to help solidify the rights of health care providers with respect to their religious beliefs. An example of this would be a conscience clause, which attempts to makes concessions to one's conscience when impacted by a law. In other words, there are laws in place that are intended to protect health care providers who refrain, for moral and/or religious reasons, from engaging in some forms of health care.

The rights of religious individuals and organizations are not just a matter of personal preference, but also of international jurisprudential value. The ethical implications of Supreme Court cases, such as that of Burwell v. Hobby Lobby, have the potential to shift personal and governmental attitudes regarding religiosity as it relates to health care. In pursuit of upholding their constitutional right to the free expression of religion, religious entities have had to legally defend their refusal to comply with government mandates, such as "to provide employee insurance plans that cover contraceptive costs", which is of moral violation when viewed with a particular interpretation of some religious texts. The willingness of a governmental body to bring these sorts of cases to the highest legal authority may be thought of as a form of intolerance, and perhaps, additionally, as a precursor to social and legal changes surrounding the "rights" of health care providers and recipients.

== Political philosophy of healthcare ==
In the political philosophy of healthcare, the debate between universal healthcare and private healthcare is particularly contentious in the United States. In the 1960s, there was a plethora of public initiatives by the federal government to consolidate and modernize the U.S. healthcare system. With Lyndon Johnson's Great Society, the U.S. established public health insurance for both senior citizens and the underprivileged. Known as Medicare and Medicaid, these two healthcare programs granted certain groups of Americans access to adequate healthcare services. Although these healthcare programs were a giant step in the direction of socialized medicine, many people think that the U.S. needs to do more for its citizenry with respect to healthcare coverage. Opponents of universal healthcare see it as an erosion of the high quality of care that already exists in the United States.

U.S. Medicare (2008)

=== Patients' Bill of Rights ===
In 2001, the U.S. federal government took up an initiative to provide patients with an explicit list of rights concerning their healthcare. The political philosophy behind such an initiative essentially blended ideas of the Consumers' Bill of Rights with the field of healthcare. It was undertaken in an effort to ensure the quality of care of all patients by preserving the integrity of the processes that occur in the healthcare industry. Standardizing the nature of healthcare institutions in this manner proved provocative. In fact, many interest groups, including the American Medical Association (AMA) and Big Pharma came out against the congressional bill. Basically, having hospitals provide emergency medical care to anyone, regardless of health insurance status, as well as the right of a patient to hold their health plan accountable for any and all harm done proved to be the two biggest stumbling blocks for the bill. As a result of this intense opposition, the initiative eventually failed to pass Congress in 2002.

=== Health insurance ===
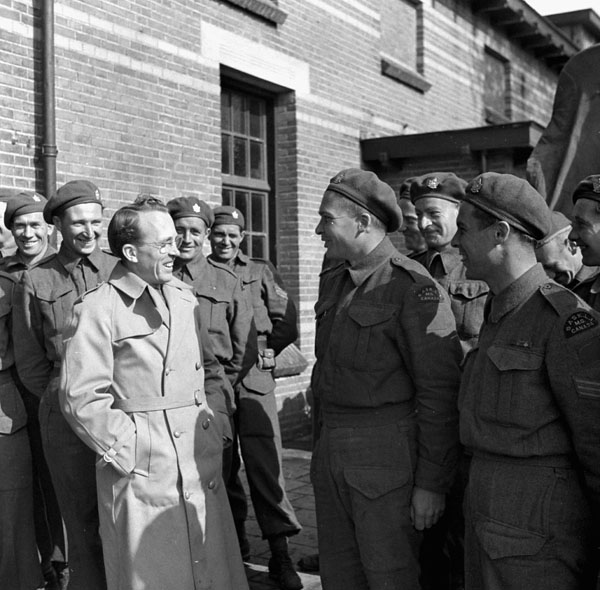
Tommy Douglas' (centre left) number one concern was the creation of Canadian Medicare. In the summer of 1962, Saskatchewan became the centre of a hard-fought struggle between the provincial government, the North American medical establishment, and the province's physicians, who brought things to a halt with a doctors' strike.

Health insurance is the primary mechanism through which individuals cover healthcare costs in industrialized countries. It can be obtained from either the public or private sector of the economy. In Canada, for example, the provincial governments administer public health insurance coverage to citizens and permanent residents. According to Health Canada, the political philosophy of public insurance in Canada is as follows:

The administration and delivery of health care services is the responsibility of each province or territory, guided by the provisions of the Canada Health Act. The provinces and territories fund these services with assistance from the federal government in the form of fiscal transfers.

And the driving force behind such a political philosophy in Canada was democratic socialist politician Tommy Douglas.

Contrasting with the U.S., but similar to Canada, Australia and New Zealand have universal healthcare systems known as Medicare and ACC (Accident Compensation Corporation), respectively.

Australian Medicare originated with Health Insurance Act 1973. It was introduced by Prime Minister (PM) Gough Whitlam's Labor Government, and was intended to provide affordable treatment by doctors in public hospitals for all resident citizens. Redesigned by PM Bob Hawke in 1984, the current Medicare system permits citizens the option to purchase private health insurance in a two-tier health system.

== Research and scholarship ==
Considering the rapid pace at which the fields of medicine and health science are developing, it becomes important to investigate the most proper and/or efficient methodologies for conducting research. On the whole, "the primary concern of the researcher must always be the phenomenon, from which the research question is derived, and only subsequent to this can decisions be made as to the most appropriate research methodology, design, and methods to fulfill the purposes of the research." This statement on research methodology places the researcher at the forefront of his findings. That is, the researcher becomes the person who makes or breaks their scientific inquiries rather than the research itself. Even so, "interpretive research and scholarship are creative processes, and methods and methodology are not always singular, a priori, fixed and unchanging." Therefore, viewpoints on scientific inquiries into healthcare matters "will continue to grow and develop with the creativity and insight of interpretive researchers, as they consider emerging ways of investigating the complex social world."

=== Clinical trials ===
Clinical trials are a means through which the healthcare industry tests a new drug, treatment, or medical device. The traditional methodology behind clinical trials consists of various phases in which the emerging product undergoes a series of intense tests, most of which tend to occur on interested and/or compliant patients. The U.S. government has an established network for tackling the emergence of new products in the healthcare industry. The Food and Drug Administration (FDA) does not conduct trials on new drugs coming from pharmaceutical companies. Along with the FDA, the National Institutes of Health sets the guidelines for all kinds of clinical trials relating to infectious diseases. For cancer, the National Cancer Institute (NCI) sponsors a series or cooperative groups like CALGB and COG in order to standardize protocols for cancer treatment.

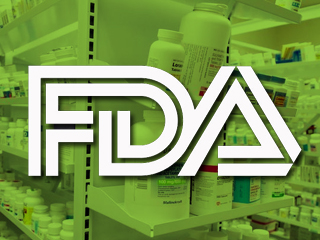
U.S. Food and Drug Administration (2006)

=== Quality assurance ===
The primary purpose of quality assurance (QA) in healthcare is to ensure that the quality of patient care is in accordance with established guidelines. The government usually plays a significant role in providing structured guidance for treating a particular disease or ailment. However, protocols for treatment can also be worked out at individual healthcare institutions like hospitals and HMOs. In some cases, quality assurance is seen as a superfluous endeavor, as many healthcare-based QA organizations, like QARC, are publicly funded at the hands of taxpayers. However, many people would agree that healthcare quality assurance, particularly in the areas cancer treatment and disease control are necessary components to the vitality of any legitimate healthcare system. With respect to quality assurance in cancer treatment scenarios, the Quality Assurance Review Center (QARC) is just one example of a QA facility that seeks "to improve the standards of care" for patients "by improving the quality of clinical trials medicine."

== Birth and death ==
=== Reproductive rights ===
The ecophilosophy of Garrett Hardin is one perspective from which to analyze the reproductive rights of human beings. For the most part, Hardin argues that it is immoral to have large families, especially since they do a disservice to society by consuming an excessive amount of resources. In an essay titled The Tragedy of the Commons, Hardin states,

To couple the concept of freedom to breed with the belief that everyone born has an equal right to the commons is to lock the world into a tragic course of action.

By encouraging the freedom to breed, the welfare state not only provides for children, but also sustains itself in the process. The net effect of such a policy is the inevitability of a Malthusian catastrophe.

Hardin's ecophilosophy reveals one particular method to mitigate healthcare costs. With respect to population growth, the fewer people there are to take care of, the less expensive healthcare will be. And in applying this logic to what medical ethicist Leonard J. Weber previously suggested, less expensive healthcare does not necessarily mean poorer quality healthcare.

=== Birth and living ===
The concept of being "well-born" is not new, and may carry racist undertones. The Nazis practiced eugenics in order to cleanse the gene pool of what were perceived to be unwanted or harmful elements. This "race hygiene movement in Germany evolved from a theory of Social Darwinism, which had become popular throughout Europe" and the United States during the 1930s. A German phrase that embodies the nature of this practice is lebensunwertes Leben or "life unworthy of life."

In connection with healthcare philosophy, the theory of natural rights becomes a rather pertinent subject. After birth, man is effectively endowed with a series of natural rights that cannot be banished under any circumstances. One major proponent of natural rights theory was seventeenth-century English political philosopher John Locke. With regard to the natural rights of man, Locke states,

If God's purpose for me on Earth is my survival and that of my species, and the means to that survival are my life, health, liberty and property – then clearly I don't want anyone to violate my rights to these things.

Although partially informed by his religious understanding of the world, Locke's statement can essentially be viewed as an affirmation of the right to preserve one's life at all costs. This point is precisely where healthcare as a human right becomes relevant.

The process of preserving and maintaining one's health throughout life is a matter of grave concern. At some point in every person's life, their health is going to decline regardless of all measures taken to prevent such a collapse. Coping with this inevitable decline can prove quite problematic for some people. For Enlightenment philosopher René Descartes, the depressing and gerontological implications of aging pushed him to believe in the prospects of immortality through a wholesome faith in the possibilities of reason.

=== Death and dying ===
One of the most basic human rights is the right to live, and thus, preserve one's life. Yet one must also consider the right to die, and thus, end one's life. Often, religious values of varying traditions influence this issue. Terms like "mercy killing" and "assisted suicide" are frequently used to describe this process. Proponents of euthanasia claim that it is particularly necessary for patients suffering from a terminal illness. However, opponents of a self-chosen death purport that it is not only immoral, but wholly against the pillars of reason.

In a certain philosophical context, death can be seen as the ultimate existential moment in one's life. Death is the deepest cause of a primordial anxiety (Die Anfechtung) in a person's life. In this emotional state of anxiety, "the Nothing" is revealed to the person. According to twentieth-century German philosopher Martin Heidegger,

The Nothing is the complete negation of the totality of beings.

And thus, for Heidegger, humans finds themselves in a very precarious and fragile situation (constantly hanging over the abyss) in this world. This concept can be simplified to the point where at bottom, all that a person has in this world is their Being. Regardless of how individuals proceed in life, their existence will always be marked by finitude and solitude. When considering near-death experiences, humans feels this primordial anxiety overcome them. Therefore, it is important for healthcare providers to recognize the onset of this entrenched despair in patients who are nearing their respective deaths.

Other philosophical investigations into death examine the healthcare's profession heavy reliance on science and technology (SciTech). This reliance is especially evident in Western medicine. Even so, Heidegger makes an allusion to this reliance in what he calls the allure or "character of exactness." In effect, people are inherently attached to "exactness" because it gives them a sense of purpose or reason in a world that is largely defined by what appears to be chaos and irrationality. And as the moment of death is approaching, a moment marked by utter confusion and fear, people frantically attempt to pinpoint a final sense of meaning in their lives.

Aside from the role that SciTech plays in death, palliative care constitutes a specialized area of healthcare philosophy that specifically relates to patients who are terminally ill. Similar to hospice care, this area of healthcare philosophy is becoming increasingly important as more patients prefer to receive healthcare services in their homes. Even though the terms "palliative" and "hospice" are typically used interchangeably, they are actually quite different. As a patient nears the end of his life, it is more comforting to be in a private home-like setting instead of a hospital. Palliative care has generally been reserved for those who have a terminal illness. However, it is now being applied to patients in all kinds of medical situations, including chronic fatigue and other distressing symptoms.

== Role development ==
The manner in which nurses, physicians, patients, and administrators interact is crucial for the overall efficacy of a healthcare system. From the viewpoint of the patients, healthcare providers can be seen as being in a privileged position, whereby they have the power to alter the patients' quality of life. And yet, there are strict divisions among healthcare providers that can sometimes lead to an overall decline in the quality of patient care. When nurses and physicians are not on the same page with respect to a particular patient, a compromising situation may arise. Effects stemming from a "gender gap" between nurses and doctors are detrimental to the professional environment of a hospital workspace.

== See also ==
- Health insurance
- Health care reform
- Ethical problems using children in clinical trials
- Ethics of circumcision
- Catholic Church and health care
- Patient advocacy
- Philosophy of medicine
