= History of cancer chemotherapy =

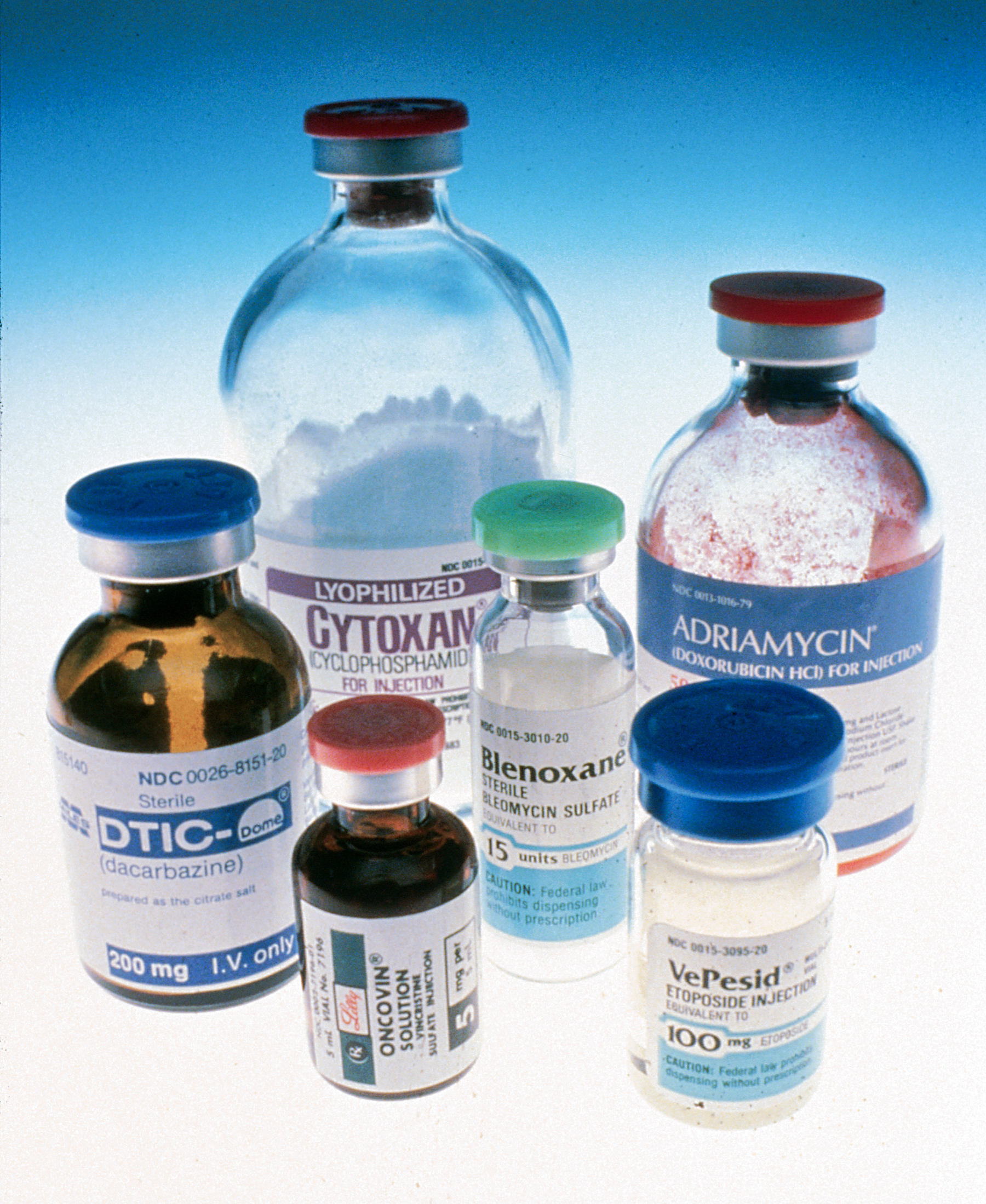
Six bottles of chemotherapeutic agents for injection, as marketed in the United States c. 1993. Clockwise from center: bleomycin, an antitumor antibiotic; vincristine, a spindle poison; dacarbazine, an alkylating agent; cyclophosphamide, a nitrogen mustard; doxorubicin, an anthracycline; and etoposide, a topoisomerase inhibitor.

The era of cancer chemotherapy began in the 1940s with the first use of nitrogen mustards and folic acid antagonist drugs. The targeted therapy revolution has arrived, but many of the principles and limitations of chemotherapy discovered by the early researchers still apply.

== Beginnings ==
The beginnings of the modern era of cancer chemotherapy can be traced directly to the German introduction of chemical warfare during World War I. Among the chemical agents used, mustard gas was particularly devastating. Although banned by the Geneva Protocol in 1925, the advent of World War II caused concerns over the possible re-introduction of chemical warfare. Such concerns led to the discovery of nitrogen mustard, a chemical warfare agent, as an effective treatment for some types of cancer.

In 1925, Marie Wreschner and Laurence Farmer Loeb at the Kaiser Wilhelm Institute for Physical Chemistry and Electrochemistry in Germany patented a method for treating cancer through the encapsulation of radioactive materials. In their patent, granted by the U.S. Patent and Trademark Office on 1 April 1930, Wreschner described the adsorption of uranyl compounds suspended in ferric hydroxide capable of emitting beta particles as a possible method for treating carcinoma. German chemist Herbert Freundlich later wrote to British colleagues that Wreschner's experiments saw the successful destruction of malignant tumors in animal tests. Wreschner had wished to continue to human trials, but was dismissed from the institute after the Nazis purged Jews from academia in 1933.

Two pharmacologists from the Yale School of Medicine, Louis S. Goodman and Alfred Gilman, were recruited by the US Department of Defense to investigate potential therapeutic applications of chemical warfare agents. Goodman and Gilman observed that mustard gas was too volatile an agent to be suitable for laboratory experiments. They exchanged a sulfur molecule for nitrogen and had a more stable compound in nitrogen mustard. Goodman and Gilman hypothetized that this agent could be used to treat lymphoma, a tumor of lymphoid cells. They first set up an animal model by establishing lymphomas in mice and demonstrated they could treat them with mustard agents. Next, in collaboration with a thoracic surgeon, Gustaf Lindskog, they injected a related agent, mustine (the prototype nitrogen mustard anticancer chemotherapeutic), into a patient with non-Hodgkin's lymphoma. The patient, a Polish immigrant to Connecticut known in literature only as JD, received his first injections on August 27, 1942 at 10 a.m. The doctors observed a dramatic reduction in the patient's tumor masses. Although the effect lasted only a few weeks, and the patient had to return for another set of treatment, that was the first step to the realization that cancer could be treated by pharmacological agents. The patient ultimately died of cancer on December 1, 1942, 96 days after his first dose. Publication of the first clinical trials was reported in 1946 in The New York Times.

A year into the start of their research, in December 1943, a German air raid in Bari, Italy led to the exposure of more than 1000 people to the SS John Harvey's secret cargo composed of mustard gas bombs. Dr. Stewart Francis Alexander, a lieutenant colonel who was an expert in chemical warfare, was subsequently deployed to investigate the aftermath. Autopsies of the victims suggested that profound lymphoid and myeloid suppression had occurred after exposure. In his report, Dr. Alexander theorized that since mustard gas all but ceased the division of certain types of somatic cells whose nature was to divide fast, it could also potentially be put to use in helping to suppress the division of certain types of cancerous cells.

After World War II was over, the Yale group's studies and the Bari incident eventually converged prompting a search for other similar compounds.

== Antifolates ==
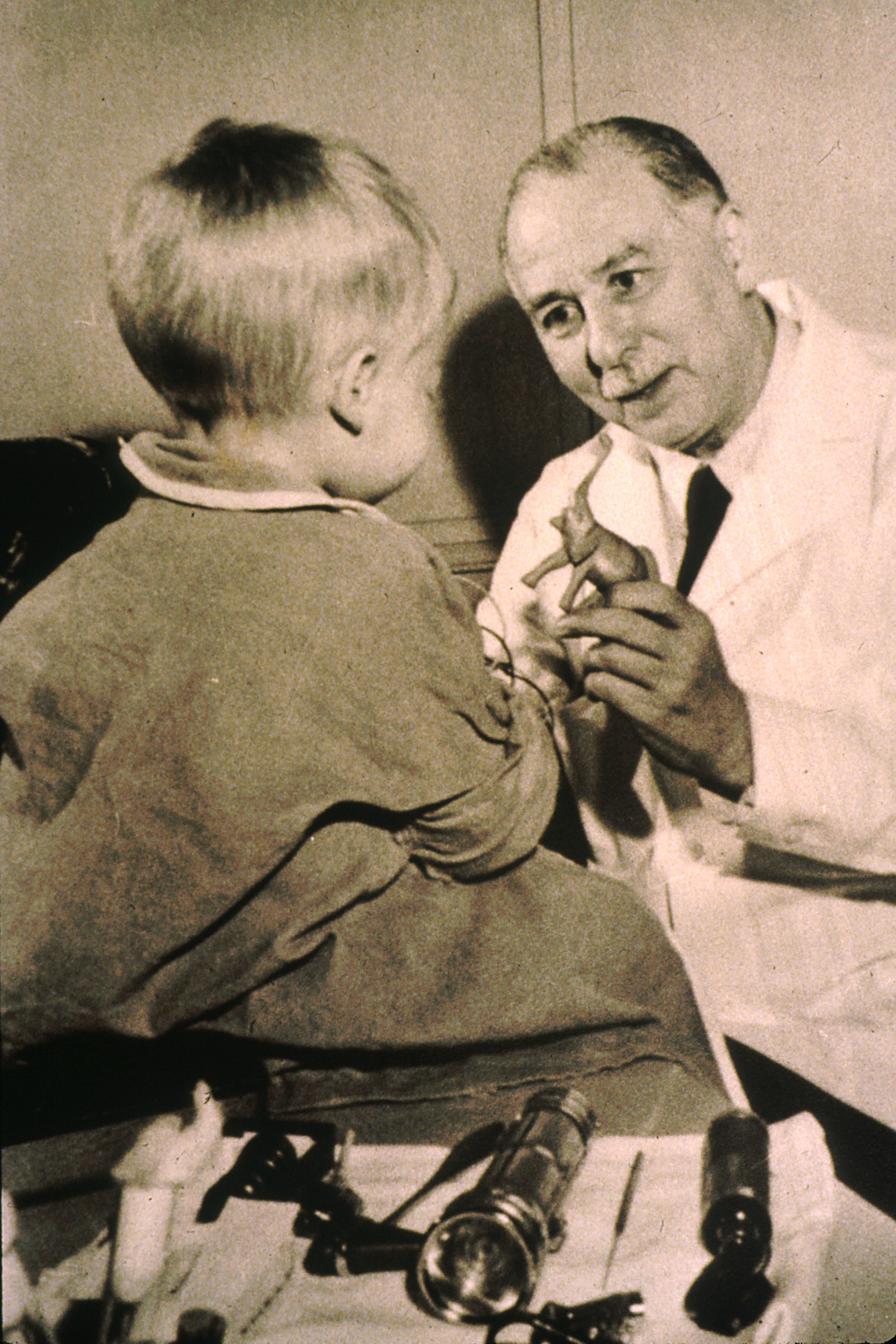
Sidney Farber's work was instrumental in showing that effective pharmacological treatment of cancer was possible

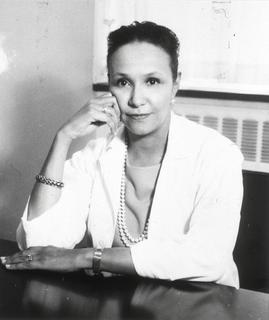
Jane C. Wright pioneered the use of the drug methotrexate to treat breast cancer and skin cancer

Shortly after World War II, a second approach to drug therapy of cancer began. Sidney Farber, a pathologist at Harvard Medical School, studied the effects of folic acid on leukemia patients. Folic acid, a vitamin crucial for DNA metabolism (the significance of DNA was not known at that time), had been discovered by Lucy Wills, when she was working in India, in 1937. It seemed to stimulate the proliferation of acute lymphoblastic leukemia (ALL) cells when administered to children with this cancer. In one of the first examples of rational drug design (rather than accidental discovery), Farber used folate analogues synthesized by Harriett Kiltie and Yellapragada Subbarow of Lederle Laboratories. These analogues — first aminopterin and then amethopterin (now methotrexate) were antagonistic to folic acid, and blocked the function of folate-requiring enzymes. When administered to children with ALL in 1948, these agents became the first drugs to induce remission in children with ALL. Remissions were brief, but the principle was clear — antifolates could suppress proliferation of malignant cells, and could thereby re-establish normal bone-marrow function. Farber met resistance to conducting his studies at a time when the commonly held medical belief was that leukemia was incurable, and that the children should be allowed to die in peace. Afterwards, Farber's 1948 report in the New England Journal of Medicine was met with incredulity and ridicule.

In 1947, Major League Baseball Hall of Famer Babe Ruth, who was battling nasopharyngeal cancer, became one of the first human subjects of pteroyl triglutamate (also known by its brand name Teropterin, and similar to aminopterin) treatment. Dr. Richard Lewisohn of Mount Sinai Hospital in New York administered the drug, and over the course of several months, Ruth's condition began to improve. However, Ruth died the following year.

In 1951, Jane C. Wright demonstrated the use of methotrexate in solid tumors, showing remission in breast cancer. Wright's group was the first to demonstrate use of the drug in solid tumors, as opposed to leukemias, which are cancers of the marrow. Several years later at the National Cancer Institute, Roy Hertz and Min Chiu Li then demonstrated complete remission in women with choriocarcinoma and chorioadenoma in 1956, discovering that methotrexate alone could cure choriocarcinoma (1958), a germ-cell malignancy that originates in trophoblastic cells of the placenta. In 1960 Wright et al. produced remissions in mycosis fungoides.

== 6-MP ==
Joseph Burchenal, at Memorial Sloan-Kettering Cancer Center in New York, with Farber's help, started his own methotrexate study and found the same effects. He then decided to try to develop anti-metabolites in the same way as Farber, by making small changes in a metabolite needed by a cell to divide. With the help of George Hitchings and Gertrude Elion, two pharmaceutical chemists who were working at the Burroughs Wellcome Co. in Tuckahoe, many purine analogues were tested, culminating in the discovery of 6-mercaptopurine (6-MP), which was subsequently shown to be a highly active antileukemic drug.

== Vinca Alkaloids ==
The Eli Lilly natural products group found that alkaloids of the Madagascar periwinkle (Vinca rosea), originally discovered in a screen for anti-diabetic drugs, blocked proliferation of tumour cells. The antitumour effect of the vinca alkaloids (e.g. vincristine) was later shown to be due to their ability to inhibit microtubule polymerization alkaloys, and therefore cell division.

== Cancer Chemotherapy National Service Center ==
The NCI, headed by Dr. John R. Heller Jr., lobbied the United States Congress for financial support for second-generation chemotherapy research. In response, Congress created a Cancer Chemotherapy National Service Center (CCNSC) at the NCI in 1955. This was the first federal programme to promote drug discovery for cancer – unlike now, most pharmaceutical companies were not yet interested in developing anticancer drugs. The CCNSC developed the methodologies and crucial tools (like cell lines and animal models) for chemotherapeutic development.

== Combination chemotherapy ==
In 1965, a major breakthrough in cancer therapy occurred. James F. Holland, Emil Freireich, and Emil Frei hypothesized that cancer chemotherapy should follow the strategy of antibiotic therapy for tuberculosis with combinations of drugs, each with a different mechanism of action. Cancer cells could conceivably mutate to become resistant to a single agent, but by using different drugs concurrently it would be more difficult for the tumor to develop resistance to the combination. Holland, Freireich, and Frei simultaneously administered methotrexate (an antifolate), vincristine (a Vinca alkaloid), 6-mercaptopurine (6-MP) and prednisone — together referred to as the POMP regimen — and induced long-term remissions in children with acute lymphoblastic leukaemia (ALL). With incremental refinements of original regimens, using randomized clinical studies by St. Jude Children's Research Hospital, the Medical Research Council in the UK (UKALL protocols) and German Berlin-Frankfurt-Münster clinical trials group (ALL-BFM protocols), ALL in children has become a largely curable disease.

This approach was extended to the lymphomas in 1963 by Vincent T. DeVita and George Canellos at the NCI, who ultimately proved in the late 1960s that nitrogen mustard, vincristine, procarbazine and prednisone — known as the MOPP regimen — could cure patients with Hodgkin's and non-Hodgkin's lymphoma.

Currently, nearly all successful cancer chemotherapy regimens use this paradigm of multiple drugs given simultaneously, called combination chemotherapy or polychemotherapy.

== Adjuvant therapy ==
As predicted by studies in animal models, drugs were most effective when used in patients with tumours of smaller volume. Another important strategy developed from this — if the tumour burden could be reduced first by surgery, then chemotherapy may be able to clear away any remaining malignant cells, even if it would not have been potent enough to destroy the tumor in its entirety. This approach was termed "adjuvant therapy".

Emil Frei first demonstrated this effect — high doses of methotrexate prevented recurrence of osteosarcoma following surgical removal of the primary tumour. 5-fluorouracil, which inhibits thymidylate synthase, was later shown to improve survival when used as an adjuvant to surgery in treating patients with colon cancer. Similarly, the landmark trials of Bernard Fisher, chair of the National Surgical Adjuvant Breast and Bowel Project, and of Gianni Bonadonna, working in the Istituto Nazionale Tumori di Milano, Italy, proved that adjuvant chemotherapy after complete surgical resection of breast tumours significantly extended survival — particularly in more advanced cancer.

== Drug discovery at the NCI and elsewhere ==
=== Zubrod's initiatives ===
In 1956, C. Gordon Zubrod, who had formerly led the development of antimalarial agents for the United States Army, took over the Division of Cancer Treatment of the NCI and guided development of new drugs. In the two decades that followed the establishment of the NCCSC, a large network of cooperative clinical trial groups evolved under the auspices of the NCI to test anticancer agents. Zubrod had a particular interest in natural products, and established a broad programme for collecting and testing plant and marine sources, a controversial programme that led to the discovery of taxanes (in 1964) and camptothecins (in 1966). Both classes of drug were isolated and characterized by the laboratory of Monroe Wall at the Research Triangle Institute.

=== Taxanes ===
Paclitaxel (Taxol) was a novel antimitotic agent that promoted microtubule assembly. This agent proved difficult to synthesize and could only be obtained from the bark of the Pacific Yew tree, which forced the NCI into the costly business of harvesting substantial quantities of yew trees from public lands. After 4 years of clinical testing in solid tumours, it was found in 1987 (23 years after its initial discovery) to be effective in ovarian cancer therapy. Notably, this agent, although developed by the NCI in partnership with Bristol-Myers Squibb, was exclusively marketed by BMS (who had utilized the synthetic methodology developed by Robert Holton at Florida State University) who went on to make over a billion dollars profit from Taxol.

=== Camptothecins ===
Another drug class originating from the NCI was the camptothecins. Camptothecin, derived from a Chinese ornamental tree, inhibits topoisomerase I, an enzyme that allows DNA unwinding. Despite showing promise in preclinical studies, the agent had little antitumour activity in early clinical trials, and dosing was limited by kidney toxicity: its lactone ring is unstable at neutral pH, so while in the acidic environment of the kidneys it becomes active, damaging the renal tubules. In 1996 a more stable analogue, irinotecan, won Food and Drug Administration (FDA) approval for the treatment of colon cancer. Later, this agent would also be used to treat lung and ovarian cancers.

=== Platinum-based agents ===
Cisplatin, a platinum-based compound, was discovered by a Michigan State University researcher, Barnett Rosenberg, working under an NCI contract. This was yet another serendipitous discovery: Rosenberg had initially wanted to explore the possible effects of an electric field on the growth of bacteria. He observed that the bacteria unexpectedly ceased to divide when placed in an electric field. Excited, he spent months of testing to try to explain this phenomenon. He was disappointed to find that the cause was an experimental artifact — the inhibition of bacterial division was pinpointed to an electrolysis product of the platinum electrode rather than the electrical field. This accidental discovery, however, soon initiated a series of investigations and studies into the effects of platinum compounds on cell division, culminating in the synthesis of cisplatin. This drug was pivotal in the cure of testicular cancer. Subsequently, Eve Wiltshaw and others at the Institute of Cancer Research in the United Kingdom extended the clinical usefulness of the platinum compounds with their development of carboplatin, a cisplatin derivative with broad antitumour activity and comparatively less nephrotoxicity.

=== Nitrosoureas ===
A second group with an NCI contract, led by John Montgomery at the Southern Research Institute, synthesized nitrosoureas, an alkylating agent which cross-links DNA. Fludarabine phosphate, a purine analogue which has become a mainstay in treatment of patients with chronic lymphocytic leukaemia, was another similar development by Montgomery.

=== Anthracyclines and epipodophyllotoxins ===
Other effective molecules also came from industry during the period of 1970 to 1990, including anthracyclines and epipodophyllotoxins — both of which inhibited the action of topoisomerase II, an enzyme crucial for DNA synthesis.

== Supportive care during chemotherapy ==
As is obvious from their origins, the above cancer chemotherapies are essentially poisons. Patients receiving these agents experienced severe side-effects that limited the doses which could be administered, and hence limited the beneficial effects. Clinical investigators realized that the ability to manage these toxicities was crucial to the success of cancer chemotherapy.

Several examples are noteworthy. Many chemotherapeutic agents cause profound suppression of the bone marrow. This is reversible, but takes time to recover. Support with platelet and red-cell transfusions as well as broad-spectrum antibiotics in case of infection during this period is crucial to allow the patient to recover.

Several practical factors are also worth mentioning. Most of these agents caused very severe nausea (termed chemotherapy-induced nausea and vomiting (CINV) in the literature) which, while not directly causing patient deaths, was unbearable at higher doses. The development of new drugs to prevent nausea (the prototype of which was ondansetron) was of great practical use, as was the design of indwelling intravenous catheters (e.g. Hickman lines and PICC lines) which allowed safe administration of chemotherapy as well as supportive therapy.

== Bone marrow transplantation ==
One important contribution during this period was the discovery of a means that allowed the administration of previously lethal doses of chemotherapy. The patient's bone marrow was first harvested, the chemotherapy administered, and the harvested marrow then returned to patient a few days later. This approach, termed autologous bone marrow transplantation, was initially thought to be of benefit to a wide group of patients, including those with advanced breast cancer. However, rigorous studies have failed to confirm this benefit, and autologous transplantation is no longer widely used for solid tumors. The proven curative benefits of high doses of chemotherapy afforded by autologous bone marrow rescue are limited to both Hodgkin's and selected non-Hodgkin's lymphoma patients who have failed therapy with conventional combination chemotherapy. Autologous transplantation continues to be used as a component of therapy for a number of other hematologic malignancies.

== Antihormone therapy ==
The hormonal contribution to several categories of breast cancer subtypes was recognized during this time, leading to the development of pharmacological modulators (e.g. of oestrogen) such as tamoxifen.

== Targeted therapy ==
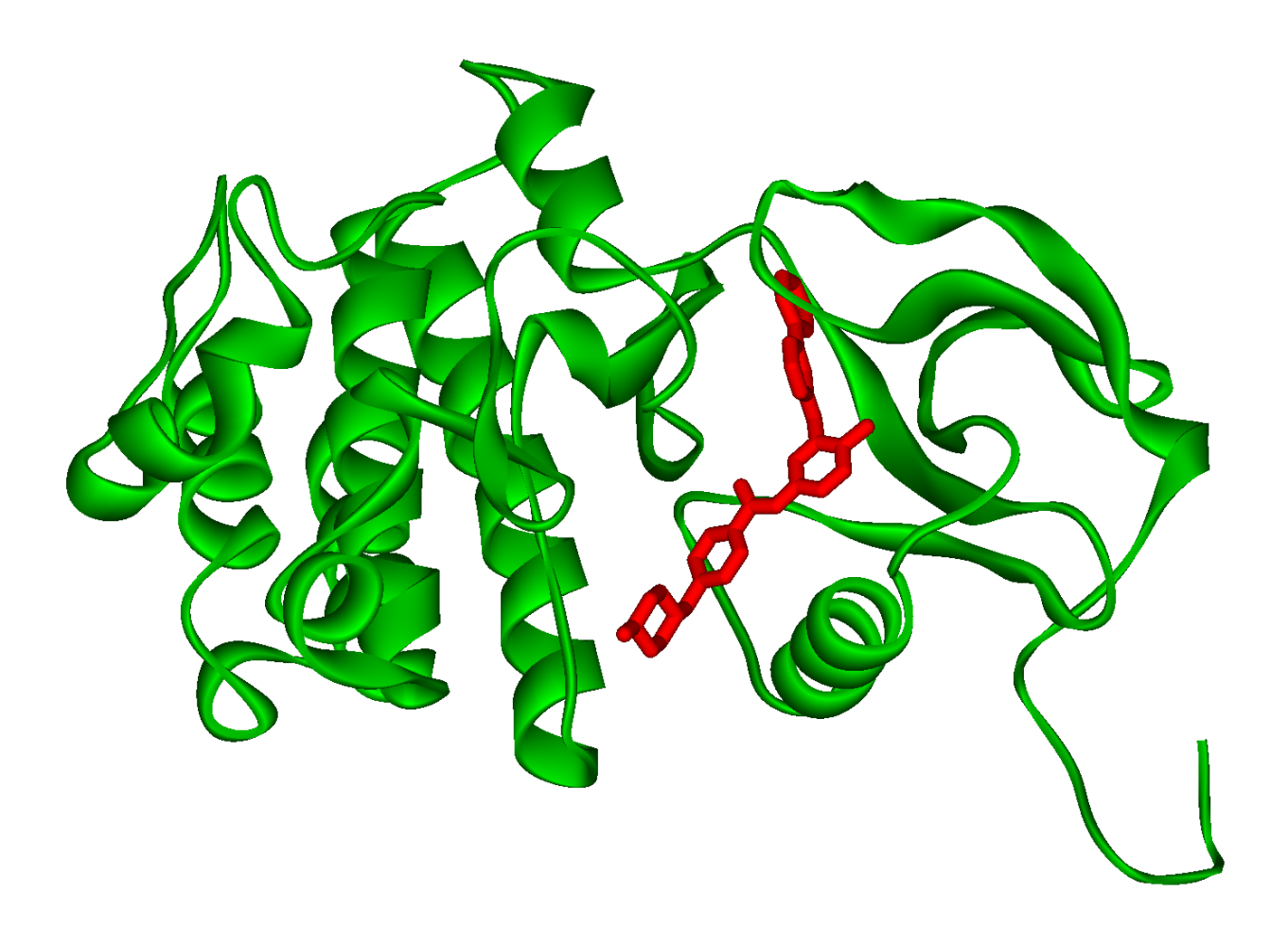
bcr-abl kinase, which causes CML, inhibited by imatinib (small molecule).

Molecular genetics has uncovered signalling networks that regulate cellular activities such as proliferation and survival. In a particular cancer, such a network may be radically altered, due to a chance somatic mutation. Targeted therapy inhibits the metabolic pathway that underlies that type of cancer's cell division.

=== Tyrosine kinase inhibitors ===
The classic example of targeted development is imatinib mesylate (Gleevec), a small molecule which inhibits a signaling molecule kinase. The genetic abnormality causing chronic myelogenous leukemia (CML) has been known for a long time to be a chromosomal translocation creating an abnormal fusion protein, kinase BCR-ABL, which signals aberrantly, leading to uncontrolled proliferation of the leukemia cells. Imatinib precisely inhibits this kinase. Unlike so many other anti-cancer agents, this pharmaceutical was no accident. Brian Druker, working in Oregon Health & Science University, had extensively researched the abnormal enzyme kinase in CML. He reasoned that precisely inhibiting this kinase with a drug would control the disease and have little effect on normal cells. Druker collaborated with Novartis chemist Nicholas Lydon, who developed several candidate inhibitors. From these, imatinib was found to have the most promise in laboratory experiments. First Druker and then other groups worldwide demonstrated that when this small molecule is used to treat patients with chronic-phase CML, 90% achieve complete haematological remission. It is hoped that molecular targeting of similar defects in other cancers will have the same effect.

=== Monoclonal antibodies ===
Another branch in targeted therapy is the increasing use of monoclonal antibodies in cancer therapy. Although monoclonal antibodies (immune proteins which can be selected to precisely bind to almost any target) have been around for decades, they were derived from mice and did not function particularly well when administered to humans, causing allergic reactions and being rapidly removed from circulation. "Humanization" of these antibodies (genetically transforming them to be as similar to a human antibody as possible) has allowed the creation of a new family of highly effective humanized monoclonal antibodies. Trastuzumab, a drug used to treat breast cancer, is a prime example.

== Effectiveness ==
The discovery that certain toxic chemicals administered in combination can cure certain cancers ranks as one of the greatest in modern medicine. Childhood ALL (Acute Lymphoblastic Leukemia), testicular cancer, and Hodgkins disease, previously universally fatal, are now generally curable diseases. They have also proved effective in the adjuvant setting, in reducing the risk of recurrence after surgery for high-risk breast cancer, colon cancer, and lung cancer, among others.

The overall impact of chemotherapy on cancer survival can be difficult to estimate, since improved cancer screening, prevention (e.g. anti-smoking campaigns), and detection all influence statistics on cancer incidence and mortality. In the United States, overall cancer incidence rates were stable from 1995 through 1999, while cancer death rates decreased steadily from 1993 through 1999. Again, this likely reflects the combined impact of improved screening, prevention, and treatment. Nonetheless, cancer remains a major cause of illness and death, and conventional cytotoxic chemotherapy has proved unable to cure most cancers after they have metastasized.

== See also ==
- Cancer (2015 PBS film)
