= National Wilms Tumor Study Group =

US research group

The National Wilms Tumor Study Group (NWTS) is a cancer research cooperative group in the United States formed to study a type of kidney tumor that affects children called Wilms' tumor. In 2001, NWTS merged with several other pediatric oncology cooperative groups to create the Children's Oncology Group (COG). However, the NWTS is still active in name today completing follow-up of the late effects of treatment for patients previously enrolled in its trials. The acronym NWTS is pronounced like the word "nitwits".

The NWTS was formed in 1969 by member institutions from Children's Cancer Study Group (CCG), Southwest Oncology Group (SWOG), and CALGB, the latter two which later merged to form the Pediatric Oncology Group (POG). The NWTS was created with the purpose of improving survival of children with Wilms' tumor. NWTS studies were conducted at over 250 pediatric oncology treatment centers in the United States, Canada, and other countries. Approximately 70-80% of patients with Wilms' tumor were enrolled on NWTS treatment protocols, totalling 440 patients per year.

NWTS ran five clinical trials, designated NWTS-1 to NWTS-5. The first four were randomized trials, whereas NWTS-5 was a clinical trial designed to look primarily at biologic prognostic factors and was not randomized. NWTS-5 was completed in 2003.
