= Alliance for Clinical Trials in Oncology =

American national clinical trials network

The Alliance for Clinical Trials in Oncology is a national clinical trials network sponsored by the National Cancer Institute (NCI) that consists of about 10,000 cancer specialists at hospitals, medical centers, and community clinics across the United States and Canada. The Alliance develops and conducts clinical trials with promising new cancer therapies, and utilizes scientific research to develop treatment and prevention strategies for cancer, as well as researching methods to alleviate side effects of cancer and cancer treatments.

The Alliance seeks to reduce the impact of cancer on people by uniting a broad community of scientists and clinicians from many disciplines, committed to discovering, validating and disseminating effective strategies for the prevention and treatment of cancer. The Alliance conducts trials in the following disease and modality areas: breast, gastrointestinal (GI), genitourinary (GU), leukemia, lymphoma, myeloma, neuro-oncology, respiratory, experimental therapeutics (rare cancers), cancer control and transplant.

The Alliance was formed by the merger of three legacy clinical trials groups: the American College of Surgeons Oncology Group (ACOSOG), the Cancer and Leukemia Group B (CALGB), and the North Central Cancer Treatment Group (NCCTG). The merger was completed in 2014.
