= Pediatric Oncology Group =

Clinical trial cooperative group

The Pediatric Oncology Group (POG) was a U.S. and Canadian clinical trial cooperative group created with the mission of studying childhood cancers. It was formed by the merger of the pediatric divisions of two other cooperative groups, the Southwest Oncology Group (SWOG) and the CALGB. In 2000, POG merged with several other pediatric cooperative groups to form the Children's Oncology Group (COG). This merger has seen its fair share of problems, especially with regard to integrating the various databases associated with each individual cooperative group. One such initiative to consolidate these databases involves caBIG or the cancer Biomedical Informatics Grid, which is guided and supported by the National Cancer Institute (NCI) in Bethesda, Maryland.

== Quality Assurance ==
The Pediatric Oncology Group has all of its protocol-driven cases reviewed at the Quality Assurance Review Center (QARC). As mandated by the National Cancer Institute (NCI), every radiotherapy (RT) department participating in an POG study submits their data to QARC for review. QARC is located in Lincoln, Rhode Island, and reviews thousands of RT cases per year. The center was founded in 1977 as a not-for-profit health care organization designed to provide quality assurance for CALGB studies. Radiotherapy data from around one-thousand hospitals in both the United States and abroad is reviewed and archived at QARC.

Another center for quality assurance is the Radiological Physics Center (RPC) in Houston, Texas. The primary responsibility of the RPC is to assure the National Cancer Institute (NCI) and its cooperative groups like POG that all participating institutions are following the basic guidelines regarding the physics-related aspects of radiotherapy. Established in 1968, the RPC has consistently received funding from the NCI in order to perform the aforementioned mission.
