= VAMP regimen =

- Specialty: Oncology

VAMP regimen or VAMP chemotherapy is a four-drug combination chemotherapy regimen, used today in the treatment of Hodgkin lymphoma. It was one of the earliest combination chemotherapy regimens, originally developed as a treatment for childhood leukemia by a group of researchers at the National Cancer Institute led by Emil Frei and Emil Freireich. The first clinical trial of VAMP began in 1961. Because it was the first time that four chemotherapeutic agents were used at once, the trial was highly controversial at its time. Although new combination chemotherapy regimens have replaced the use of VAMP in the treatment of childhood leukemia, VAMP is considered an important precursor to modern treatments, confirming the effectiveness of combination chemotherapy and leading to the use of combination chemotherapy regimens to treat other types of cancer.

The VAMP regimen developed by Freireich and Frei was a combination of vincristine, amethopterin, mercaptopurine, and prednisone. Now, other combinations and doses that are referred to as VAMP, including C-VAMP and a VAMP regimen that replaces the mercaptopurine of the original combination with doxorubicin. All these regimens take advantage of the synergistic effects of combining multiple chemotherapy agents.

== History ==
By 1960, several chemotherapeutic agents had emerged, among these nitrogen mustards, antifolates, and purine analogs, each with their own individual history and development. Furthermore, the work of Howard Skipper, who argued that every remaining cancer cell in the body must be eradicated in order to ensure the survival of the patient, shifted clinical practice towards more aggressive chemotherapy regimens. Importantly, Skipper also established that the use of multiple chemotherapy drugs at once provided synergistic benefits over single agents. However, the idea of combination chemotherapy was initially met with resistance by researchers concerned about the toxicity of multiple harmful drugs being used simultaneously.

VAMP emerged amid a period of cautious and methodical testing of various combinations of chemotherapeutic agents. Due to the immense possibilities of combinations and the potential dangers of these aggressive regimens, this trial process was slow and, in the view of some, inefficient.

Emil Frei and Emil Freireich, researchers at the National Cancer Institute (NCI), took bold and decisive action, proposing a regimen of four chemotherapeutic agents, more drugs than had ever been previously attempted. The aggressiveness and potential lethal toxicity of this proposal was alarming to many fellow members of the NCI, who felt that Frei and Freireich were making a dangerous break with the systematic trial processes that characterized the leukemia group of the NCI. However, Frei and Freireich felt that the current pace of the NCI was too slow to make progress.

Initially, the leukemia group rejected the VAMP proposal, denying funding until many of their current trials had been completed. However, an arrangement was reached that involved the VAMP trial being run separately from the rest of the leukemia group at the NCI. The trial began in 1961 on children with leukemia.

In the initial weeks, the children were pushed to the brink of death by VAMP's four chemotherapy agents, each cytotoxic on its own. After a few weeks, however, the children's marrow healed, remissions came, and leukemia was undetectable in many of the patients. These remissions astounded Frei and Freirdrich's peers, and gained supporters even from those who formerly resisted the trial. The remission rate ultimately increased to 60%, and around half of those remissions lasted for several years.

However, the remissions were not permanent for most. Because none of the components of VAMP could cross the blood–brain barrier, there was nothing stopping the leukemia from reemerging in the nervous system and invading the brain. These relapses proved deadly for all but five percent of the patients.

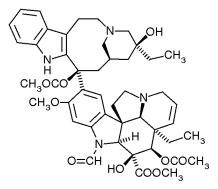
Molecular structure of vincristine

== Mechanisms of action ==
VAMP includes four drugs, vincristine, amethopterin, mercaptopurine, and prednisone, operating under independent pathways, which work in concert with one another as an anti-tumor therapy. Combining multiple chemotherapeutic drugs into one treatment helps overcome the problem of drug resistance. Furthermore, combination chemotherapy allows multiple independently-acting drugs to be administered at their maximum dose, which increases the treatments toxicity to cancer cells without being deadly to the patient.

Vincristine is a drug isolated from the Madagascar periwinkle, first discovered by the Eli Lilly company in 1958 in a search process that involved testing thousands of plant extracts. It was initially planned to be an antidiabetic drug. However, it was soon found to be an effective anti-leukemia agent even at small doses. Vincristine functions by binding to and inhibiting microtubule production in the mitotic spindle necessary for the cellular replication, halting cell division in metaphase. With their chromosomes unable to separate, the cells ultimately die.

Molecular structure of methotrexate

Methotrexate, or amethopterin, is a drug developed by Sidney Farber. It operates by inhibiting the production of folic acid, a precursor to cellular DNA that is necessary for DNA synthesis. By interfering with several major enzymes involved in folic acid production, including dihydrofolate reductase, methotrexate disrupts cellular replication.

Molecular structure of mercaptopurine

Mercaptopurine, or 6-MP, is an analog of guanine, and inhibits cellular replication through multiple mechanisms. 6-MP halts purine synthesis, and also products of the metabolism of 6-MP become incorporated during DNA replication, leading to a mismatching of nucleotides that triggers apoptosis through the cell's DNA repair mechanisms.

Molecular structure of prednisone

Prednisone is a corticosteroid that is used as an anti-inflammatory agent in the treatment of a variety of medical conditions. Generally, it reduces redness and swelling, but its use in cancer involves inducing apoptosis in lymphocytes. More research remains to be done to determine the exact mechanism of prednisone-induced apoptosis.
