= James F. Holland =

American physician (1925–2018)

- James F. Holland
- Born: May 16, 1925; Morristown, New Jersey, U.S.
- Died: March 22, 2018 (aged 92); Scarsdale, New York, U.S.
- Education: Columbia University College of Physicians and Surgeons
- Medical career
- Profession: Physician
- Institutions: National Cancer Institute, Roswell Park Comprehensive Cancer Center, Icahn School of Medicine at Mount Sinai
- Sub-specialties: Oncology
- Research: Combination chemotherapy
- Awards: Lasker Award, 1972

James Frederick Holland (May 16, 1925 – March 22, 2018) was an American physician and Distinguished Professor of Neoplastic Diseases at the Icahn School of Medicine at Mount Sinai in New York. Early in his career, he had worked for the National Cancer Institute and Roswell Park Comprehensive Cancer Center.

Holland was considered a key figure in the development of cancer chemotherapy. His 1953 clinical trial on acute leukemia resulted in the formation of Acute Leukemia Group B, a research collaboration that later became known as the Cancer and Leukemia Group B. He served as president of the American Society of Clinical Oncology and the American Association for Cancer Research.

== Early life ==
Holland was born on May 16, 1925, in Morristown, New Jersey. His Jewish father, Albert H. Holland Sr. (1891–?), was from New York City and a county judge. James Holland was initially drawn to cardiology because his father suffered from heart disease. Holland's mother, Mary Louise Layer Holland, was a homemaker and later a nurse.

Holland graduated from Princeton University in 1944. He completed medical school at the Columbia University College of Physicians and Surgeons in 1947 with a medical degree and then served as a U.S. Army Medical Corps captain from 1949 to 1951. Returning in 1951, Holland had secured a hospital job at Presbyterian Hospital in New York before the end of the war, but his tour of duty was extended and Presbyterian Hospital was unable to hold a position for him. Instead, he ended up at Francis Delafield Hospital, which had just opened as a cancer center. Though Holland was initially hoping that another slot would open up at Presbyterian, he found that he preferred to remain at a specialty cancer institution.

== Career ==
In 1953, while Holland was a researcher at the National Cancer Institute (NCI), he designed a clinical trial for the treatment of acute leukemia. The study examined the combined use of two chemotherapy drugs, methotrexate and mercaptopurine. The trial was still in progress the next year when Holland moved to Roswell Park Comprehensive Cancer Center. When the NCI's new chief of oncology, Gordon Zubrod, agreed to continue the trial, it became the first multicenter study of acute leukemia. Holland conducted further leukemia research with physicians from the NCI and the Children's Hospital of Buffalo. That research group received government funding for the study of chemotherapy. It became known as Acute Leukemia Group B (and later Cancer and Leukemia Group B).

Holland became a close associate of oncologist Emil "Tom" Frei. From the 1950s to the 1980s, either Holland or Frei chaired the CALGB. Holland–Frei Cancer Medicine became an influential oncology reference book; ten editions have been published. Holland, Frei and Emil Freireich later created another drug regimen for acute lymphoblastic leukemia (ALL) in children. The combination of methotrexate, mercaptopurine, vincristine and prednisone – together known as the POMP regimen – produced sustained remission in these patients.

After leaving Roswell Park, Holland spent several months conducting cancer research in the Soviet Union. He joined the faculty at Mount Sinai in 1973. Oncologist Vincent DeVita has referred to Holland as "one of the founding fathers of cancer chemotherapy." DeVita said that Holland's work proved that combination chemotherapy had the potential to cure cancer. According to DeVita, Holland's influence ensured that childhood leukemia research received ongoing attention. Though acute leukemia had been considered incurable upon the formation of the CALGB, the ten-year cure rate for ALL had reached 50% by 1975.

Holland served as the president of two national cancer research organizations: the American Association for Cancer Research (1970–71) and the American Society of Clinical Oncology (1976–78). He received the Albert Lasker Award for Clinical Medical Research in 1972.

== Personal life ==
While he worked at Roswell Park, Holland met his wife, Jimmie C. Holland, who trained as a psychiatrist at Memorial Sloan-Kettering Cancer Center. Holland had a daughter, Diane Louise, with his first wife, Fern Lucille Rahe, whom he married at Madison Avenue Presbyterian Church in June 1945. Their marriage came to an end in a divorce. He met his second wife, and they had five more children together, Steven M., Sally, Peter, Mary and David. One of Holland's siblings, Thomas R. Holland (1926–2013), was the first oncologist in Morristown. His elder brother, Albert H. Holland Jr. (d. 1988), was the medical director of the FDA from 1954 to 1959. Holland's son, Steven M. Holland, an immunologist and infectious disease medicine physician, is the director of NIAID's division of intramural research.

== Death ==
He died at the age of 92 on March 22, 2018, at his home in Scarsdale, New York, from complications of cardiovascular disease.
