= J. Bruce Beckwith =

American pathologist (1933–2025)

John Bruce Beckwith (September 18, 1933 – January 21, 2025) was an American pediatric pathologist known for helping to identify Beckwith-Wiedemann syndrome, which is partly named after him. He is also known for his role as reference pathologist for the National Wilms Tumor Study Group, a position he held from 1969 until his retirement thirty years later. He is also recognized for his research on sudden infant death syndrome, which he helped to define in the 1960s.

Beckwith was born in Spokane, Washington, and grew up in St. Ignatius, Montana. A 1954 graduate of Whitman College, he taught at the University of Washington, the University of Colorado School of Medicine, and Loma Linda University, among other places.

Beckwith received the Fred W. Stewart Award from Memorial Sloan Kettering Cancer Center in 1994. In 1998, he was named an honorary fellow of the Royal College of Pathologists; the same year, he became the first recipient of the National Institutes of Health's Astute Clinician Award. He received the American Society of Pediatric Hematology/Oncology's Distinguished Career Award in 2005.

Beckwith died in Missoula, Montana on January 21, 2025, at the age of 91.
