= Holland–Frei Cancer Medicine =

Medical textbook

- Editor: James F. Holland, Emil Frei, et al.
- Language: English
- Genre: Medical textbook
- Publisher: Lea & Febiger (1st edition)
- Publication date: 1973
- ISBN: 0-8121-0372-6

Holland–Frei Cancer Medicine is a medical textbook focused on oncology (cancer). It was the first comprehensive textbook about cancer and its treatment that was written in the US.

The first edition was edited by two American physicians, James F. Holland and Emil Frei, and written by themselves plus 158 individual authors. The book itself was a single volume of just over 2,000 pages. Later editions were split into multiple volumes and had more than 300 authors.

Meant to be a comprehensive source, it covers biology of cancer, diagnosis, epidemiology, and its treatment. The disease-specific chapters (e.g., the chapter specifically on lung cancer) tend to have relatively little information about the basic biology.

== Reception ==
It has been compared to DeVita's Cancer: Principles and Practice of Oncology and Souhami's Oxford Textbook of Oncology, with each having its strengths and weaknesses. Content about treatments is generally high-quality. In a 2005 review of the sixth edition, Souhami's won greater praise for being evidence-based and providing data than either Holland–Frei's or DeVita's. It has also been criticized for being more focused on US standards instead of global standards.

A perennially popular book, it was listed among the top 10 best-selling cancer reference works in 2004.

== Publication history ==
Edition	Year	Editors	Publisher	ISBN
1	1973	James F. Holland and Emil Frei	Lea & Febiger	ISBN 0-8121-0372-6
2	1982	James F. Holland and Emil Frei		ISBN 0-812-10603-2
3	1993	James F Holland, Emil Frei, Robert C Bast Jr, Donald W Kufe, Donald L Morton, Ralph R Weichselbaum	Lea & Febiger	ISBN 0-812-11422-1
4	1997		Williams & Wilkins	ISBN 978-0683040951
5	2000		People's Medical Publishing House	
6	2003	Donald W Kufe, Raphael E Pollock, Ralph R Weichselbaum, Robert C Bast Jr, Ted S Gansler, MBA, James F Holland, and Emil Frei III	BC Decker	ISBN 978-1-55009-213-4
7	2007	Donald W Kufe, Robert C Bast, William Hait, Waun Ki Hong, Raphael E Pollock, Ralph R Weichselbaum, James F Holland, Emil Frei III	BC Decker	ISBN 978-1-55009-307-0
8	2010	Waun Ki Hong, Donald W. Kufe, Robert C. Bast Jr, William Hait, Raphael E. Pollock, Ralph R. Weichselbaum, James F. Holland, Emil Frei III	People's Medical Publishing House	ISBN 978-1607950141
9	2017	Bast, Robert C; Hait, William N; Kufe, Donald W; Weichselbaum, Ralph R; Holland, James F; Croce, Carlo M; Piccart‐Gebart, Martine; Wang, Hongyang; Hong, Waun Ki	John Wiley & Sons	ISBN 978-1-118-93469-2
10	2023	Bast, Robert C.; Byrd, John C.; Croce, Carlo; Hawk, Ernest; Khuri, Fadlo R.; Pollock, Raphael E.; Tsimberidou, Apostolia-Maria; Willett, Christopher G.; Willman, Cheryl L.	American Association for Cancer Research and Wiley Blackwell	ISBN 978-1-119-75069-7
