= Cancer and Leukemia Group B =

U.S. research cooperative group

CALGB logo

Cancer and Leukemia Group B (CALGB; former name: Acute Leukemia Group B, ALGB) is a cancer research cooperative group in the United States.

CALGB research is focused on seven major disease areas: leukemia, lymphoma, breast cancer, lung cancer, gastrointestinal malignancies, genito-urinary malignancies, and melanoma. In each of these areas, multi-modality treatment programs are designed by national experts. CALGB is headquartered at the University of Chicago in Chicago, Illinois and maintains its statistical centers at Mayo Clinic in Rochester, Minnesota and Duke University in Durham, North Carolina.

== History ==
The group that was to become known as the CALGB got its roots when James F. Holland initiated a clinical trial for acute leukemia in 1953 while at the National Cancer Institute. In 1954, before the trial was complete, Holland moved to Roswell Park Comprehensive Cancer Center (then known as Roswell Park Memorial Institute), but the new chief of oncology Gordon Zubrod at the NCI agreed to continue the trial, and a multicenter trial was thus born. In 1955, Congress granted $5 million for the study of chemotherapy and began the Chemotherapy National Service Center which was headquartered at the NCI. An interinstitutional protocol for the treatment of leukemia was started by Emil "Tom" Frei at the NCI, involving three groups: NCI, RPMI, and Children's Hospital in Buffalo.

In 1956, this group was designated the Acute Leukemia Group B by the Chemotherapy National Service Center, and Frei became its chairman. (There was also an Acute Leukemia Group A, which later became the Children's Cancer Study Group.) During this time, the group expanded to a national level. Holland became the new chairman in 1962 after Frei resigned. The group changed its name to Cancer and Leukemia Group B in 1976 to reflect its role with solid tumors as well as leukemia.

In March 2011, CALGB merged with two other cooperative groups, the American College of Surgeons Oncology Group (ACOSOG) and North Central Cancer Treatment Group (NCCTG), to form the Alliance for Clinical Trials in Oncology. This was due to the call in April 2010 from the Institute of Medicine to strengthen and streamline operations among NCI clinical trials cooperative group programs. In June 2010, ACOSOG, CALGB and NCCTG integrated their statistical, data management and information technology functions. Having already merged some functions, the three groups began evaluating the possibility of full integration to further streamline operations, expand their scientific research opportunities, and apply for funding as a new, larger cooperative group.

In June 2011, governing boards of ACOSOG, CALGB and NCCTG endorsed a proposed Alliance constitution, bylaws and transition plan. The Transition Alliance Board of Directors then ratified the constitution and elected a new Group Chair, Monica M. Bertagnolli, MD, along with board members to serve on the Executive Committee. The first Alliance Group Meeting was held in November 2011 in Chicago, Illinois. The merger was completed in 2014.

== Function ==
CALGB Research Objectives

- To answer important therapeutic questions through large clinical trials
- To develop a strong multidisciplinary approach to cancer treatment and prevention
- To integrate information obtained from basic science and from economic and psychosocial investigations with information from clinical trials
- To explore the relationship between dose density and therapeutic outcome
- To systematically explore methods of optimizing treatment for individual patients
- To introduce novel therapies and treatment approaches for patients with poor prognoses
- To study quality of life and impact of cost on cancer patients
- To encourage fresh and innovative ideas of new investigators
- To involve community hospitals in CALGB cancer research
- To maintain a high degree of quality control in all CALGB science
- To increase participation of minority populations, the elderly and women in clinical trials
- To collect, analyze, and publish the results of CALGB studies

== Studies ==
The number of CALGB protocols involving multimodality treatment of adult solid tumors has increased steadily over the years. Areas of particular interest within CALGB are the role of minimally invasive surgery in patients receiving state-of-the-art multimodality therapy as well as neoadjuvant therapy prior to surgery.

During the 1970s, the CALGB initiated the application of immunologic methods for the study of leukemia and lymphoma. Continuing with progressively more sophisticated studies, interest has expanded to include the application of molecular-genetic techniques to characterize leukemias, lymphomas, and solid tumors at the gene level.

Pharmacokinetic data are important for determining the optimal dose or schedule of a drug. The Pharmacology & Experimental Therapeutics Committee has increasingly focused on pharmacogenetics, the study of how genetic variation may impact on the toxicity or efficacy of drug therapy. The CALGB has a long history of accomplishments in evaluating new therapeutic agents. The Group has developed innovative strategies for testing new agents while allowing patients to receive standard therapies.

The CALGB has pioneered the use of telephone interviews for data collection concerning quality of life in cancer patients. Studies exploring the relationship between therapy and quality of life and the economic impact of new treatments are underway. CALGB has been among the leaders in designing studies specifically assess the pharmacology and tolerance of chemotherapy in older patients, barriers to treatment of older patients on clinical trials, and therapeutic options for older women with early stage breast cancer.

== Study development and monitoring ==
The concept for a new study originated by a CALGB member is discussed by the Disease Committee and Modality Committee core; it is then discussed by the full committee. The committee chairs bring the concept to the Executive Committee and, if approved, the Study Chair develops a draft protocol. The relevant Committee Chair, the responsible Statistician, appropriate chairs of other Disease and Modality committees, patient advocates, and the Principal Investigators at the main member institutions are involved in the protocol design. After CALGB review and NCI approval, the Central Office officially activates the protocol. A Data and Safety Monitoring Board (DSMB) periodically reviews interim reports prepared by the Statistical Center for all Phase III studies. When the required number of patients has been entered on a study, the study is closed. The DSMB may elect to terminate a protocol early or to continue a study beyond its intended accrual. Final analysis of the data is the responsibility of the Statistical Center and the Study Chair.

The CALGB Radiation Oncology Quality Assurance Subcommittee reviews CALGB data under the auspices of the Quality Assurance Review Center (QARC) in Lincoln, Rhode Island. QARC was organized to monitor radiotherapy quality assurance programs for several cooperative groups and is supported independently of the CALGB. Today QARC provides radiotherapy quality assurance and diagnostic imaging data management to all of the National Cancer Institute (NCI) sponsored cooperative groups. These groups include CALGB, the Children's Oncology Group (COG), the Eastern Cooperative Oncology Group (ECOG), the Southwest Oncology Group (SWOG), and others. Although QARC is largely supported by grants from the NCI and NIH (National Institutes of Health), the center also contracts privately with the pharmaceutical industry so as to offer its services in clinical trials for anti-cancer drugs. Lastly, QARC maintains a strategic affiliation with the University of Massachusetts Medical School (UMMS) in Worcester, Massachusetts.

The Institutional Performance Evaluation Committee (IPEC) develops and implements standards of performance for the CALGB and reviews performance of protocol requirements and quality of data submitted by individual institutions on a semi-annual basis.

The CALGB protects the privacy of our clinical trial participants as required by law. The CALGB recognizes the importance of policies and procedures that encourage women and minority participation in CALGB clinical trials; currently, more than 50% of CALGB study patients are women. The Minority Initiative program was created to increase the number of minority patients participating in CALGB studies. Particular attention is directed toward developing protocols that focus on diseases that exact a heavy toll on minority populations.
