= Gordon Zubrod =

American physician

C. Gordon Zubrod
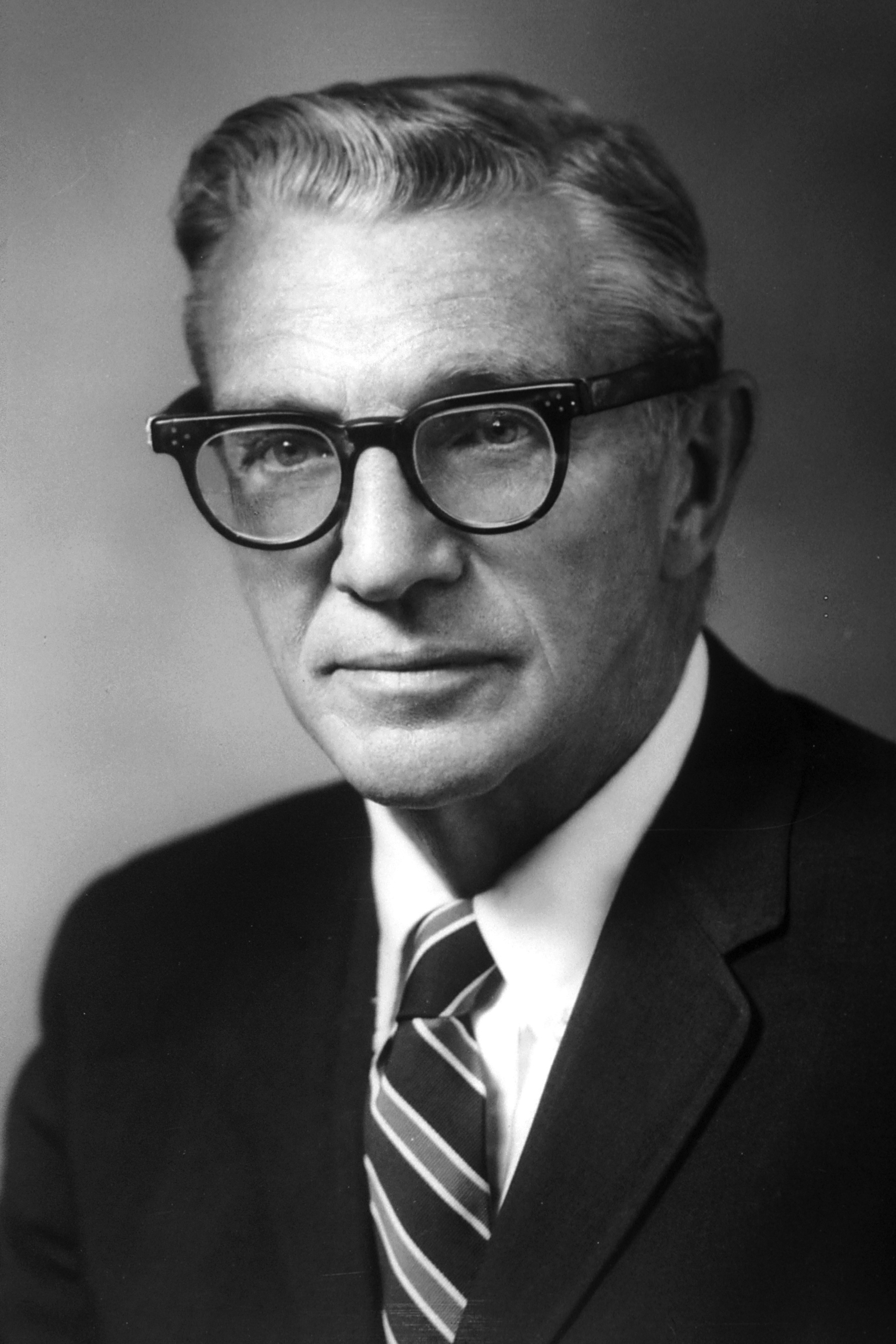
- Born: January 22, 1914; Brooklyn, New York, U.S.
- Died: January 19, 1999 (aged 84); Washington, D.C., U.S.
- Education: College of the Holy Cross (BA); Columbia University (MD)
- Known for: Development of chemotherapeutic drugs
- Awards: Albert Lasker Awards
- Scientific career
- Fields: Cancer research, chemotherapy
- Workplaces: Johns Hopkins University Medical School; Saint Louis University; National Institutes of Health; University of Miami

Charles Gordon Zubrod (January 22, 1914 – January 19, 1999) was an American oncologist who played a prominent role in the introduction of chemotherapy for cancer. He was one of the recipients of the 1972 Albert Lasker Awards in recognition of his contributions to the field, amongst many other doctorates and awards.

== Career ==
Zubrod, an alumnus of the Georgetown Preparatory School (class of 1932), the College of the Holy Cross (class of 1936), and Columbia University College of Physicians and Surgeons (1940 class), served in the U.S. army medical corps during World War II, where he worked on a replacement for quinine in the treatment of malaria. The unit eventually discovered chloroquine.

In 1946 he went to Johns Hopkins University Medical School, and worked under E.K. Marshall studying penicillin. In 1953 he moved to Saint Louis University where he was appointed assistant professor of medicine and director of research.

Based on his experience and pharmacological expertise developing drugs for malaria, Zubrod was recruited to the National Cancer Institute in 1954 as clinical director to develop the cancer drug program into a systematic program for new drug discovery, drug development, and clinical evaluation. There, he quickly rose through the ranks, first being promoted to head of the Division of Cancer Treatment in 1956 and scientific director in 1961. Early on, he recruited investigators including Emil Frei and Emil Freireich to the NCI and supported cooperative studies of childhood acute leukemia, helping establish combination chemotherapy as an effective approach to cancer treatment. He also organized the NCI's cooperative clinical-trials program and became the first chair of the Eastern Cooperative Oncology Group, helping establish multicenter clinical trials as a central component of cancer research. The resulting work contributed to the development and clinical evaluation of multiple classes of chemotherapy drugs. Zubrod was particularly associated with the introduction of platinum-containing compounds such as cisplatin.

Zubrod's name is also connected to a widely used assessment scale for performance of cancer patients, the Performance Status of the Eastern Cooperative Oncology Group (ECOG) for Patients with Cancer (Zubrod scale).

Zubrod left the NCI in 1974, and became a professor and chair of the department of oncology at the University of Miami School of Medicine (now the Leonard M. Miller School of Medicine) and served at the director of the Florida Comprehensive Cancer Center. He retired from this position in 1990.

He served as president of the American Association for Cancer Research in 1977-1978.

In 1997, Zubrod published Stairway of Surprise: A Biography of Kay and Gordon Zubrod, a memoir of his life and career.

== Personal Life and death ==
Zubrod married Christina Catherine (Kay) Mullins in 1940 with whom he had 5 children. They remained married until her death in 1998. Zubrod died on January 19, 1999 in Washington, DC.

== See also ==
- History of cancer chemotherapy

== Books ==
- Sugarbaker, Everett V; Ketcham, Alfred S; Zubrod, C Gordon. Interdisciplinary cancer therapy : adjuvant therapy. Chicago: Year Book Medical Publishers, 1977.
- Zubrod, C Gordon. Perspectives in cancer. In: Clinical Cancer Seminar (1975: Miami, Fla.). Hormones and Cancer. New York: Stratton Intercontinental Medical Book Corp., 1976.

== Review papers ==
- Zubrod, CG (December 1979). "Historic milestones in curative chemotherapy". Semin. Oncol. 6: 490–505. PMID 394331.
- Zubrod, CG; Selawry, O (1978). "The treatment of lung cancer". Adv Intern Med. 23: 451–67. PMID 204171.
- Zubrod, CG (March 1974). "Present status of cancer chemotherapy". Life Sci. 14: 809–18. PMID 4597493.
- Zubrod, CG (1969). "Trends in chemotherapy research". Proc Can Cancer Conf. 8: 31–9. PMID 4893428.
- Zubrod, CG (November 1967). "The skin and antitumor drugs". Arch Dermatol. 96: 560–4. PMID 4861428.
