= Min Chiu Li =

American physician

Min Chiu Li 李敏求
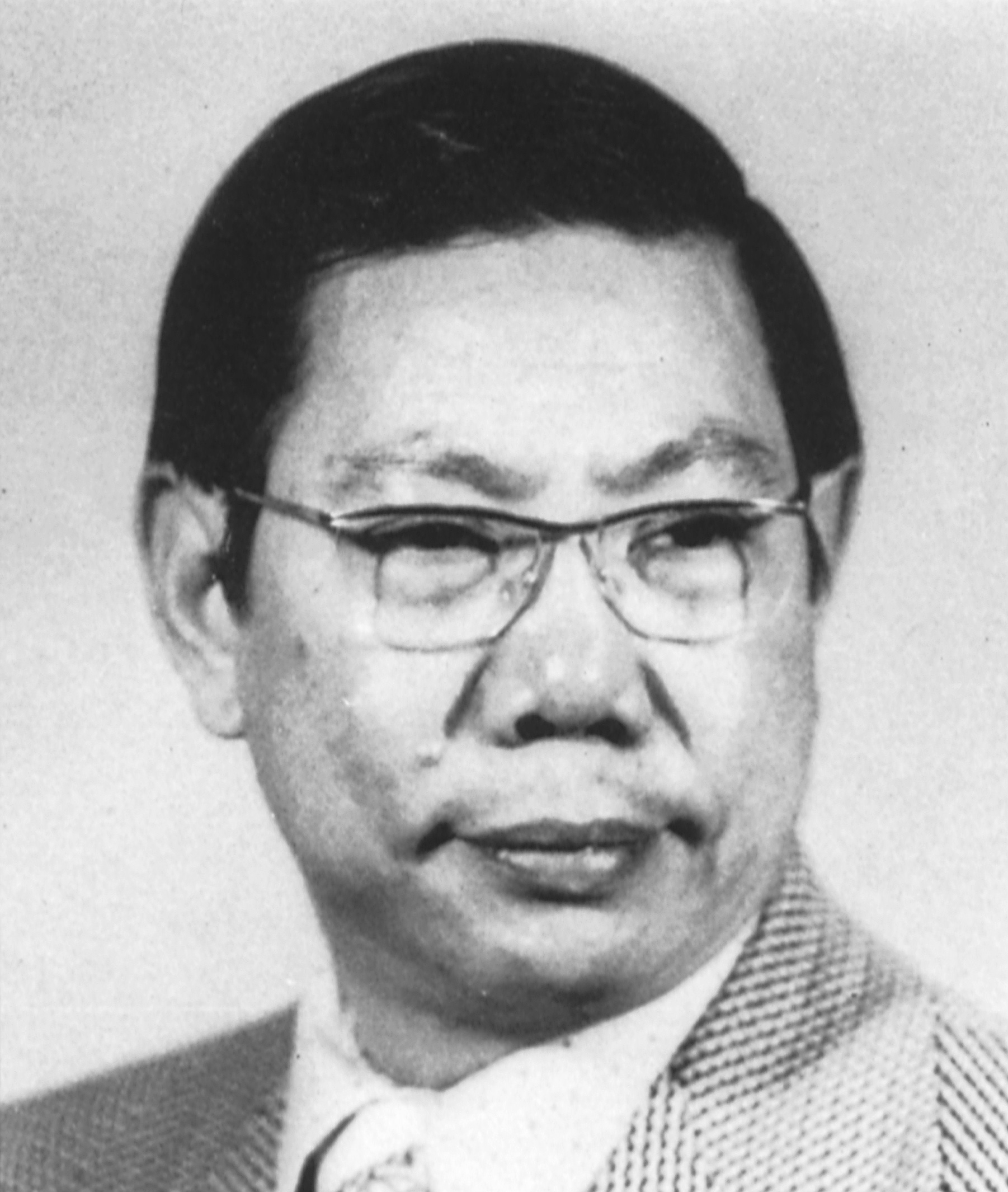
- Born: 1919; Mukden, China
- Died: 1980
- Education: Mukden Medical College
- Spouse: Pei Chia Hsu (1924–1980)
- Awards: Lasker-DeBakey Clinical Medical Research Award
- Scientific career
- Fields: Oncology
- Workplaces: National Cancer Institute; Memorial Sloan Kettering Cancer Center; Nassau Hospital

Min Chiu Li (Chinese: 李敏求; pinyin: Lǐ Mǐnqiú; 1919–1980) was a Chinese-American oncologist and cancer researcher. Li was the first scientist to use chemotherapy to cure widely metastatic, malignant cancer.

== Early life and education ==
Born in China, Li studied at Mukden Medical College in present-day Shenyang. Li came to the United States in 1947 for medical training at the University of Southern California, but was unable to return to his home country due to the Chinese Civil War. Li served as a resident at Chicago's Presbyterian Hospital (now Rush University Medical Center) and from 1953 to 1955 worked as a Damon Runyon Fellow at Memorial Hospital (now Memorial Sloan Kettering Cancer Center) in New York City. In 1955, Li accepted a position as an assistant obstetrician in the laboratory of Roy Hertz at the National Cancer Institute (NCI). Li took the job primarily to avoid being drafted into the US military during the Korean War, but became obsessed with finding a cancer cure after watching patients die in terrible pain from choriocarcinoma, a cancer of the placenta.

== Cancer research ==
Li began to treat his choriocarcinoma patients with an antifolate chemotherapy drug called methotrexate. A decade earlier Sidney Farber had discovered that injecting folic acid into children with leukemia accelerated the progress of the disease. Farber hypothesized that leukemia could be treated with a folate antagonist, a drug with a molecular structure similar to that of folic acid which would bind to the folate receptors in cancer cells, preventing them from receiving the folic acid they needed. Farber was able to use a drug of this type, aminopterin, to achieve a temporary remission in childhood leukemia. In the early 1950s, Jane C. Wright used methotrexate, a less toxic drug of the same type, to treat breast cancer.

Between 1953 and 1955, while still at Sloan Kettering, Li and his colleagues experimented with using methotrexate as a cancer treatment. Although they were unable to demonstrate any improvement in patient health, the team made one important finding: When patients were being treated with methotrexate, urine levels of the hormone human chorionic gonadotropin (hCG) dropped steadily. Li hypothesized that the patients' tumors were secreting hCG, and as a result, that the level of hCG in a patient's urine could be used to measure the effectiveness of a particular treatment.

In 1955, after moving to the National Cancer Institute, Li had the opportunity to test his hypotheses. Li's first patient was the 24-year-old wife of a U.S. Navy dental technician. A lesion in one of her lungs had ruptured, filling her chest cavity with blood and air (a condition known as hemopneumothorax) and leaving her near death. After consultation with pharmacologist Paul Condit, Li administered a single 10 mg dose of methotrexate. Defying expectations, the patient survived through the next day, at which point Li administered a 50 mg dose. Over the next several days, Li noted slight improvements in the patient's hCG levels, but they soon climbed again. Concluding that the 50 mg dose of methotrexate had provided some temporary benefits, Li decided to try four daily doses of 25 mg. The patient improved enough that within three weeks she was able to sit up in a chair. Li repeated the regimen of daily doses and, although she had several complications brought on by the toxicity of the drugs, including leukopenia, diarrhea and stomatitis, the patient continued to improve. Within four months she was "normal without evidence of disease."

Li treated two additional patients with choriocarcinoma that had metastasized to the lungs and achieved similar results: complete remission within four months. During his work with these three patients Li tried varying the amount of methotrexate given to the patients and the frequency of the doses. He concluded that a dose of 100–125 mg given every day for four or five days was more effective than a single, larger dose.

Li and his colleagues found that methotrexate eliminated the visible tumors in patients whose choriocarcinoma had metastasized. However, Li noted that the patients' blood tests continued to show an elevated level of hCG. Although the patients did not exhibit what doctors traditionally considered "clinical evidence of cancer", such as tumors, Li continued to treat them with chemotherapy based on their elevated hCG levels. The National Cancer Institute administration disapproved, feeling that by continuing treatment Li was experimenting on his patients and unnecessarily poisoning them with the chemotherapy drug. In 1957, the NCI fired Li and he returned to Sloan Kettering.

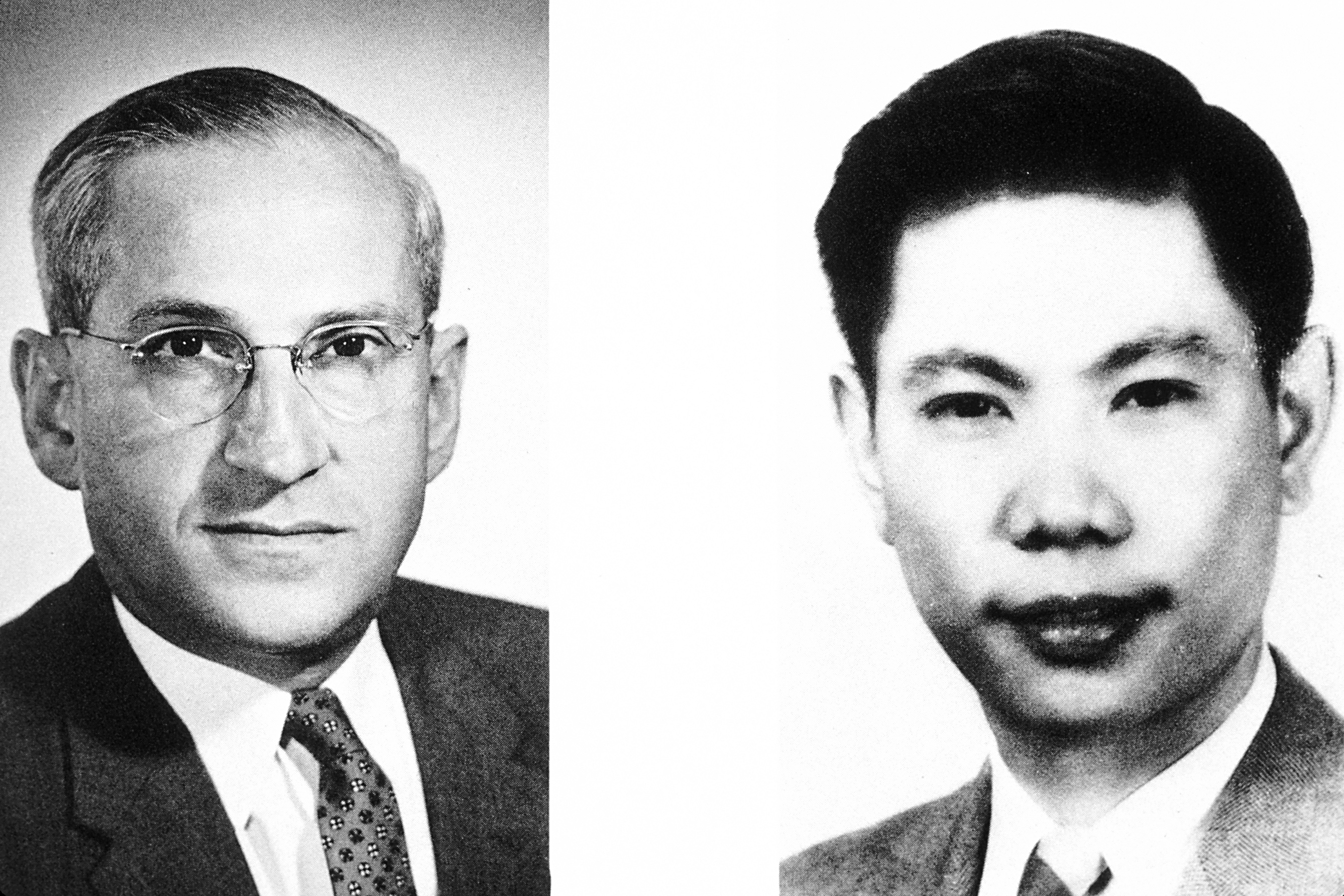
Li and Roy Hertz, his colleague at the National Cancer Institute

However, Li was ultimately vindicated. Those patients whose methotrexate treatment was stopped once the visible tumors disappeared inevitably relapsed, while the patients who continued to be treated until their hCG levels returned to normal were cured. Fellow cancer researcher Emil Freireich described Li's insight, that cancer was likely to recur in patients if a chemical tumor marker was found, as an "extraordinarily important new principle in cancer treatment". Before the work of Li and his colleagues, 90% of women who developed choriocarcinoma died within a year. Today, with chemotherapy, choriocarcinoma can be cured in almost every case without surgery.

Li made several subsequent contributions to cancer research. In 1960, he demonstrated that metastatic testicular cancer could be treated with chemotherapy, and in 1977, he showed that the use of fluorouracil in addition to surgery improved the survival rates of patients with colon cancer. In the 1970s, Li served as Director of Medical Research at New York's Nassau Hospital and later as Professor of Medicine at Loma Linda University School of Medicine.

== Recognition ==
Li received the Lasker-DeBakey Clinical Medical Research Award for his work in 1972 and, in 1975, was appointed Chairman of the National Cancer Research Committee of Taiwan's National Science Council.
