= Ben E. May =

American businessman and philanthropist (1889–1972)

Ben May, 1971 photograph

Ben E. May (1889–1972) was an American businessman and philanthropist in Mobile, Alabama who helped found the Ben May Institute for Cancer Research at the University of Chicago and established the Southern Research Institute in Birmingham, Alabama. The Ben May Library—Mobile's central public library—is named in his honor.

== Early life ==
At the age of fifteen, May worked in a sawmill, where he acquired the expertise with which he would eventually make his fortune. After only a year of formal higher education at the Georgia Institute of Technology, May moved to Mobile, Alabama, where he quickly recognized the value of the region's timber holdings and began acquiring previously-harvested properties with the idea of reforesting them.

== Business career ==
May's fortune was made during World War I, when he supplied England with much-needed timber for the nation's war effort. May then re-invested that fortune in land in southwest Alabama, Florida, and California. In 1940, he founded and became president of the Gulf Lumber Company in Mobile, and he served as vice-president of Blackwell Nurseries, director of the First National Bank of Mobile, and director of Morrison's Cafeteria.

== Philanthropy ==
May was motivated mainly by the desire to help physicians and scientists eradicate disease. He supported the Weizmann Institute; funded the research of Sir Alexander Fleming, the discoverer of penicillin; aided the investigations of Paul Dudley White, renowned cardiologist affiliated with Massachusetts General Hospital and Harvard Medical School in Boston, Massachusetts; and helped found a cancer research institute led by Charles B. Huggins, director of oncology research at the University of Chicago. May was also instrumental in establishing the Southern Research Institute in Birmingham.

On November 6, 1971, Mr. May established The Ben May Charitable Trust (the "Trust"), consisting of a trustee (currently Hancock Whitney Bank) and a three-member distribution committee, of which he was an original member. The Trust donated $1 million to help renovate the main library in downtown Mobile, Alabama, and the library was renamed the Ben May Public Library in his honor on March 23, 2004. Due to the continuous support from the Trust, the Weizmann Institute established the Ben May Center for Chemical Theory and Computation in 2018 to bring scientists together to study the fundamental properties of materials and physical systems by using advanced theoretical and computational tools spanning a broad range of scales. In 2020, the Trust donated $1,270,000 to the Barton Academy Foundation as an anchor donor for the purpose of establishing the Barton Academy for Advanced World Studies. The Trust continues to support a wide array of local, national, and international charitable causes through the issuance of funds pursuant to grant requests.
