= Imaging and Radiation Oncology Core =

US research center

- Type: Non-profit organization
- Industry: Quality assurance, Clinical trials, cancer research
- Products: Diagnostic imaging data management
- Website: www.irocqa.org

The Imaging and Radiation Oncology Core (IROC) is a center for the evaluation of data produced by clinical trials funded by the National Cancer Institute, as part of the National Clinical Trials Network "to provide integrated radiation oncology and diagnostic imaging quality control programs... thereby assuring high quality data for clinical trials designed to improve the clinical outcomes for cancer patients worldwide."

== Centers ==
There are currently six centers:

IROC Houston QA Center, at the MD Anderson Cancer Center

IROC Ohio QA Center, at Ohio State University Wexner Medical Center and James Comprehensive Cancer Center.

IROC Rhode Island QA Center in Lincoln, Rhode Island, administered by the University of Massachusetts Medical School

IROC Philadelphia (RT) QA Center, at the ACR Research center in Philadelphia,

IROC Philadelphia (Imaging) QA Center, at the ACR Research center in Philadelphia,

IROC St Louis QA Center at Washington University School of Medicine

== History ==
The history of the Rhode Island Center (previously known as QARC) goes back to the late 1970s when Rhode Island Hospital was conducting RT QA reviews of leukemia-based protocols for the CALGB, which is one of the major NCI-sponsored cooperative groups. Other cooperative groups like the Pediatric Oncology Group and the Children's Cancer Study Group decided to use the center's quality control. QARC began to seek funding from the NCI in order to manage the large influx of data, and received its first grant in 1980. Sixteen years later, in 1996, QARC switched its affiliation from Brown Medical School to the University of Massachusetts Medical School (UMMS). By late 2003, it moved from the Roger Williams Medical Center to offices in Federal Hill, Providence, Rhode Island; in August 2010, it relocated to its current site in Lincoln, Rhode Island.
