= SWOG =

American cancer organization

SWOG (formerly the Southwest Oncology Group) is a National Cancer Institute (NCI)-supported organization that conducts clinical trials in adult cancers. It is one of five "network groups" that make up the U.S. National Clinical Trials Network.

Comprising more than 4,000 cancer researchers at more than 650 institutions across the United States and Canada, it is one of the largest of the NCI's clinical trial cooperative groups. Member institutions include 24 of the NCI-designated cancer centers, many university medical centers, private institutions, and Community Clinical Oncology Programs.

SWOG is headquartered at the Oregon Health & Science University in Portland, with an operations office in San Antonio, Texas and a statistical center in Seattle, Washington.

SWOG - Leading cancer research. Together.

SWOG was created by the NCI in 1956 as the Southwest Cancer Chemotherapy Study Group (SWCCSG) and was headquartered in Houston, Texas. Its primary purpose was to study leukemia, a cancer of the blood which primarily affects children. Then in 1958, the NCI directed the SWCCSG to include the study of adult cancers, and separate administrative divisions were created for pediatric and adult cancers. The group's name was eventually changed to Southwest Oncology Group to reflect its new mission. Although in its early decades most SWOG member institutions were located in the Southwestern United States, the group spread to include members all over the United States and Canada. In 2010, in recognition of this national scope, the group dropped the regional qualifier from its name and adopted the acronym, SWOG, as its official name.

== Quality Assurance ==
SWOG has all of its protocol-driven cases reviewed at the Quality Assurance Review Center (QARC). As mandated by the National Cancer Institute (NCI), every radiotherapy (RT) department participating in a SWOG study submits their data to QARC for review. QARC is located in Lincoln, Rhode Island and reviews thousands of RT cases per year. The center was founded in 1977 as a not-for-profit health care organization designed to provide quality assurance for CALGB studies. Radiotherapy data from around one-thousand hospitals in both the United States and abroad is reviewed and archived at QARC.

Another center for quality assurance is the Radiological Physics Center (RPC) in Houston, Texas. The primary responsibility of the RPC is to assure the National Cancer Institute (NCI) and its cooperative groups like SWOG that all participating institutions are following the basic guidelines regarding the physics-related aspects of radiotherapy. Established in 1968, the RPC has consistently received funding from the NCI in order to perform the aforementioned mission.
