= Howard E. Skipper =

American oncologist (1915–2006)

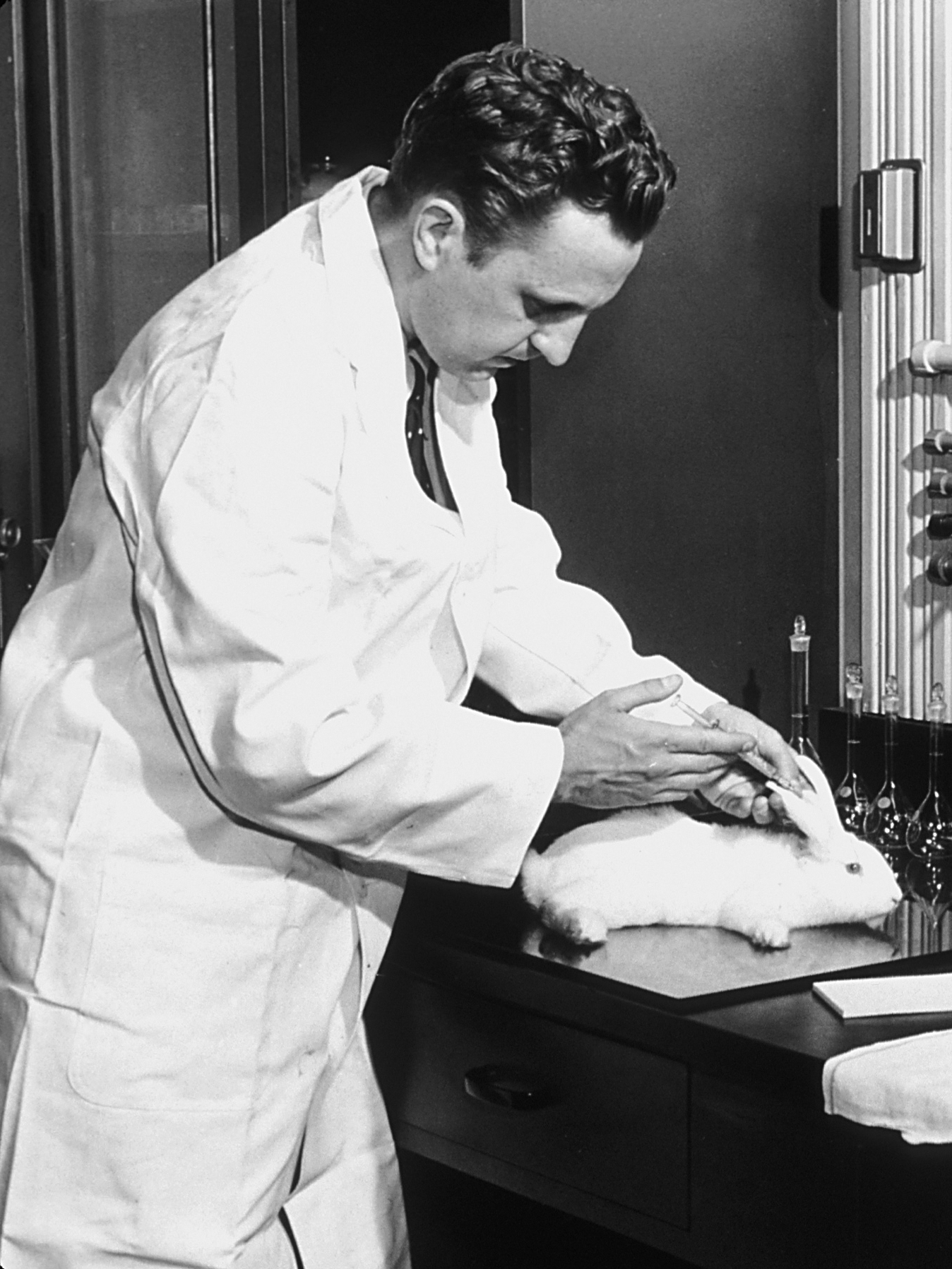
Howard Skipper, from Southern Research Institute in Birmingham, Alabama

Howard Earle Skipper (born in Avon Park, Florida on November 21, 1915; died in Mountain Brook, Alabama on January 2, 2006) was a noted American oncologist. He grew up in Sebring, Florida and received his science degrees (BS, MS, PhD) from the University of Florida.

During the war, he became interested in cancer research while working for what was then called the Chemical Warfare Service of the United States Army. By 1957, he had become a notable cancer researcher in Alabama and went on to serve as head of the Southern Research Institute.

== Awards ==
- 1974 Albert Lasker Award for Basic Medical Research (shared)
- 1980 Bristol-Myers Squibb Award
- 1982 Kettering Prize
