= Emil J. Freireich =

American oncologist (1927–2021)

- Born: March 16, 1927; Chicago, Illinois, US
- Died: February 1, 2021 (aged 93); Houston, Texas, US
- Education: University of Illinois College of Medicine
- Known for: Combination chemotherapy
- Children: 4
- Scientific career
- Fields: Oncology
- Workplaces: National Cancer Institute; University of Texas MD Anderson Cancer Center

Emil J. Freireich (March 16, 1927 – February 1, 2021) was an American cancer researcher. He was recognized as a pioneer in the treatment of cancer and use of chemotherapy and is often known as the father of modern leukemia therapy.

== Early life ==
Freireich was born in Chicago on March 16, 1927. His Jewish parents, Mary (Klein) and David Freireich, immigrated to the United States from Hungary. He grew up in poverty during the Great Depression. His father died when he was two years old, and his mother worked in a factory to support Emil and his elder sister. He earned his B.S. and M.D. in Medicine from the University of Illinois College of Medicine. After graduation from medical school, he did an internship at Cook County Hospital. However, he was fired due to a dispute with the administrators, after he attempted to treat a patient with heart failure who had been transferred to the hospital's "death room" and left for dead. As a result, he moved to Presbyterian Hospital of Chicago where he studied internal medicine under Howard Armstrong. He subsequently studied hematology under Joe Ross at Mass Memorial Hospital in Boston, and published a study on anemia during his time there. It was there that he also met his wife, Haroldine Cunningham, who worked as a nurse at the hospital. He moved to the National Institutes of Health in 1955 to avoid being drafted into the army as a physician by joining the Public Health Service. One decade later, he joined the University of Texas MD Anderson Cancer Center in Houston, together with Emil Frei, his friend and co-worker at the National Cancer Institute (NCI). They were tasked with creating a chemotherapy program.

== Combination chemotherapy ==
In 1965, Freireich, Frei, and James F. Holland hypothesized that cancer could best be treated by combinations of drugs, each with a different mechanism of action. Cancer cells could conceivably mutate to become resistant to a single agent, but by using different drugs concurrently it would be more difficult for the tumor to develop resistance to the combination. After many experimental challenges, Holland, Freireich, and Frei simultaneously administered methotrexate, vincristine, 6-mercaptopurine (6-MP) and prednisone, together referred to as the VAMP regimen, and induced long-term remissions in children with acute lymphoblastic leukemia (ALL). With incremental refinements of original regimens, using randomized clinical studies by St. Jude Children's Research Hospital, the Medical Research Council in the UK (UKALL protocols) and German Berlin-Frankfurt-Münster clinical trials group (ALL-BFM protocols), ALL in children has become a largely curable disease. This approach was extended to the lymphomas in 1963 by physicians at the NCI, who ultimately proved that nitrogen mustard, vincristine, procarbazine and prednisone, known as the MOPP regimen, could cure patients with Hodgkin's and non-Hodgkin's lymphoma. Currently, nearly all successful cancer chemotherapy regimens use this paradigm of multiple drugs given simultaneously, called combination chemotherapy or polychemotherapy.

Freireich stated that he was unfazed by the criticism he initially received for attempting this pioneering method of treatment. He led the Center's Leukemia Research Program during the 1980s and 1990s. He made contributions to over 600 scientific papers and over 100 books. The Center established the Emil J. Freireich Award for Excellence in Education to honor his efforts of setting up graduate teaching programs to promote research. It gives recognition to "members of the teaching faculty for excellence in education contributions".

== Later life and death ==
Freireich was profiled in Canadian author Malcolm Gladwell's 2013 book, David and Goliath: Underdogs, Misfits, and the Art of Battling Giants. He was honored as a Fellow of the American Association for Cancer Research in 2014. He was employed as the Ruth Harriet Ainsworth Chair, Distinguished Teaching Professor, Director of Adult Leukemia Research Program, and Director of Special Medical Education Programs, at the MD Anderson Cancer Center.

Freireich retired in September 2015, after working at the MD Anderson Cancer Center for 50 years. Nonetheless, he kept on teaching on a part-time basis until the outbreak of the COVID-19 pandemic. He went on to participate virtually on the center's key meetings.

Freireich died from COVID-19 at the MD Anderson Cancer Center in Houston on February 1, 2021. He was 93; and is survived by his wife, Haroldine, their four children, six grandchildren, and three great-grandchildren.

== Selected awards ==
Freireich was a recipient of numerous awards for his research, including:

- 2008 Paul Ehrlich Magic-Bullet Lifetime Achievement Award
- 2005 Gerald P. Bodey Sr., Distinguished Award
- 2003 Pollin Prize for Pediatric Research, Columbia University
- 2001 Cino del Duca Award, 11th International Congress on Anti-Cancer Treatment
- 2000 Charles A. LeMaistre Outstanding Achievement Award
- 1996 Medical Oncology Fellows Outstanding Teacher Award, University of Texas MD Anderson Cancer Center
- 1996 Return of the Child Award, Leukemia Society of America
- 1990 First NIH Distinguished Alumni Award
- 1983 Charles F. Kettering Prize, General Motors Cancer Research Foundation
- 1981 Jeffrey A. Gottlieb Memorial Award, MD Anderson Cancer Center
- 1979 de Villiers International Achievement Award, Leukemia and Lymphoma Society
- 1976 David A. Karnofsky Memorial Award and Lecture, ASCO
- 1972 Albert Lasker Award for Basic Medical Research

== See also ==
- History of cancer chemotherapy
