= Health Insurance Act 1973 =

Parliament of Australia
- Long title: An Act providing for Payments by way of Medical Benefits and Payments for Hospital Services and for other purposes
- Citation: No. 42 of 1974 No. 42, 1974 as amended
- Territorial extent: States and territories of Australia
- Royal assent: 12 April 1974
- Commenced: 12 April 1974
- Status: Amended

The Health Insurance Act of 1973 (Cth) was an Act of the Parliament of Australia, passed by the Labor Whitlam government, which introduced the Commonwealth of Australia's first universal healthcare scheme: Medicare (Australia). It was later amended under the Fraser government, wherein Medibank Private was established and the public healthcare scheme was progressively wound back. The Hawke government re-established the scheme under the name Medicare.
