= Eve Wiltshaw =

British physician, researcher and consultant

Eve Wiltshaw OBE FRCP (23 January 1927 – 13 May 2008) was a British physician who was a researcher and consultant at the Royal Marsden Hospital. She was an expert in medical oncology, and led the United Kingdom's first clinical trials of cisplatin. In 1998, she wrote A History of the Royal Marsden Hospital.

== Research and career ==
In 1955, Wiltshaw joined the Royal Marsden Hospital, where she established the Sarcoma Unit, which provided multi-disciplinary care to people with cancer.

After the 1970 discovery that cisplatin was an effective anti-cancer drug, Wiltshaw was involved with the discovery of chemotherapy. She ran the clinical trials of cisplatin at the Royal Marsden, the first trial of the drug in the United Kingdom. Despite the drug causing some side effects (particularly kidney toxicity and nausea), it was effective for people with ovarian cancer. In the years that followed, researchers looked to develop anti-cancer drugs that were as effective but caused fewer adverse effects. Eventually researchers identified carboplatin, and Wiltshaw led the clinical trials that showed it was just as effective as cisplatin.

Wiltshaw was awarded an Order of the British Empire for her contributions to cancer care.

== Personal life ==
After Wiltshaw died in 2008, the Royal Marsden Hospital named a ward in her honour.

== Selected publications ==
- D. I. Jodrell; M. J. Egorin; R. M. Canetta; et al. (1 April 1992). "Relationships between carboplatin exposure and tumor response and toxicity in patients with ovarian cancer". Journal of Clinical Oncology. 10 (4): 520–528. doi:10.1200/JCO.1992.10.4.520. ISSN 0732-183X. PMID 1548516. Wikidata Q33363246.
- R. E. Hawkins; J. B. Schofield; C. Fisher; E. Wiltshaw; J. A. McKinna (1 January 1992). "The clinical and histologic criteria that predict metastases from cystosarcoma phyllodes". Cancer. 69 (1): 141–147. doi:10.1002/1097-0142(19920101)69:1<141::AID-CNCR2820690125>3.0.CO;2-1. ISSN 0008-543X. PMID 1309302. Wikidata Q35224705.
- D Catovsky; J Galetto; A Okos; D A Galton; E Wiltshaw; G Stathopoulos (1 August 1973). "Prolymphocytic leukaemia of B and T cell type". The Lancet. 2 (7823): 232–234. doi:10.1016/S0140-6736(73)93135-8. ISSN 0140-6736. PMID 4124423. Wikidata Q53787102.
- Wiltshaw, Eve (1998). A History of the Royal Marsden Hospital (1st ed.). Middlesex: Altman. ISBN 1-86036-009-2. OCLC 47623588.
