= People's Medical Publishing House =

Chinese publishing company

People's Medical Publishing House Co., Ltd.
- Founded: 1953年6月1日
- Country of origin: People's Republic of China
- Headquarters location: No19, Panjiayuan Nanli, Chaoyang District, Beijing 100021, China
- Distribution: China and USA
- Publication types: Books, periodicals, electronic audio-visual products
- Nonfiction topics: medicine
- Official website: http://www.pmph.com/

The People's Medical Publishing House (PMPH; simplified Chinese: 人民卫生出版社; traditional Chinese: 人民衛生出版社; pinyin: Rénmín Wèishēng Chūbǎnshè), located in Beijing, is the largest medical publishing company in China, producing over 4000 titles of publications per year. It was founded in 1953, and is now under the National Health Commission of the People's Republic of China, majoring in editing and publishing books, journals and e-products in both Western and Traditional Chinese Medicine.

== History ==
People's Medical Publishing House was established on June 1, 1953. In the early years, it translated and published a large number of Russian textbooks and references.

Since 1994, it focused on medical textbooks, monographs and reference books, of both western and Chinese traditional medicine.

In 2000, PMPH was privatized, though still receiving general approval for its operations from the government.

In 2008, PMPH acquired BC Decker, a Canadian medical publisher, and established a branch in the United States.

In 2016, PMPH became a group company.

== Publications ==
PMPH publishes more than 1,500 new titles and reprints 4,000 existing titles every year, including medical textbooks, academic monographs, popular science books, medical journals, multilingual books and e-products, in both western and traditional Chinese medicine. Among them there are many popular books in China, such as 《实用内科学》 (Practical Internal Medicine)，《黄家驹外科学》 (Wang Jiaju Surgery), 《实用儿科学》 (Practical Pediatrics), 《新编药物学》 (New Pharmacology), 《人体解剖彩色图谱》 (Color Atlas of Human Anatomy),《本草纲要》 (Compendium of Materia Medica), etc. The ISBN of PMPH starts with "978-7-117".

PMPH-USA translates and publishes clinical references, textbooks, eBooks, and online materials for medical sciences and practices.

== International cooperation ==
In June, 2013, PMPH signed a strategic collaboration agreement with Elsevier to deepen and expand their collaboration from translating books to authoring books and developing information products, as well as distributing products.

In 2007, PMPH entered into a strategic alliance with the American Psychiatric Association.

PMPH also has collaboration with Wolters Kluwer Health, a leading global provider of information for healthcare professionals and students.

== Honors ==
PMPH has owned various awards, including

- First-Class Publishing House (Top 100 Book Publishing Units in China).
- The title of “First Advanced Collective in National Textbook Construction”.
- China Good Book and National Excellent Textbook Award.
