= Southern Research =

US research organization

Southern Research is a not-for-profit US 501(c)(3) research organization that conducts basic and applied research for commercial and non-commercial organizations across four divisions: Drug development, Drug discovery, Energy & Environment, and Engineering.

== History ==
Southern Research was founded in Birmingham, Alabama, on October 11, 1941, by Thomas Martin as the Alabama Research Institute.

Although Martin was named chairman of the newly chartered organization in December, 1941, activities were put on hold in the aftermath of the attack on Pearl Harbor and the beginning of US involvement in World War II. Two years later, in December 1943, with a promise of support from the Alabama Power Company, Martin reengaged the Alabama's industrial leaders and received over $100,000 in philanthropic donations.

Alabama Power Company pledged an additional US$15,000 per year for five years, $75,000 total, and this was enough for the organization to finance laboratory space and hire researchers and staff. The following year, 1944, the decision was made to change the institute's name from Alabama Research Institute, to Southern Research Institute.

Around this same time, Southern Research Institute hired its first director, Wilbur Lazier. Though he only stayed in this role for four years, Lazier is credited with recruiting many figures that shaped the history of the organization, including Howard E. Skipper.

Southern Research celebrated its 75th anniversary in October 2016. In celebration of this milestone the director of National Institutes of Health (NIH), Francis Collins, produced a video congratulating the organization on its anniversary.

== Leadership ==
In June 2021, Josh Carpenter was named president and CEO of Southern Research. Before joining Southern Research, Carpenter served as director of the Innovation and Economic Opportunity Department for the City of Birmingham, where he led the city's efforts in workforce development, COVID recovery and business expansion. Previously, he worked as the director of External Affairs at the University of Alabama at Birmingham, as an assistant professor of economics at UAB and as a non-resident senior fellow at The Brookings Institution.

Southern Research Past Presidents
| Year | Name |
|---|---|
| 2013 – 2019 | Arthur J. Tipton, PhD |
| 2006 - 2013 | John A. Secrist III, PhD |
| 2001 - 2006 | Robert C. Lonergan |
| 1999 - 2000 | J. David Prejean, PhD |
| 1997 - 1999 | Gilbert E. Dwyer |
| 1987 - 1997 | John W. Rouse Jr., PhD |
| 1981 - 1987 | Sabert Oglesby Jr. |
| 1974 - 1980 | Howard E. Skipper, PhD |
| 1948 - 1974 | William M. Murray Jr., PhD |
| 1944 - 1948 | Wilbur A. Lazier, PhD |

== Drug development ==
Southern Research's Drug Development division is the largest of the organization's four divisions. Set up like a contract research organization (CRO), Southern Research provides commercial and government clients with nonclinical and clinical trial support services. They offer studies including both in vitro and in vivo testing of small molecule compounds, vaccines, biologics, and other test articles in therapeutic areas including infectious disease, CNS and cancer. Current service areas include: Bioanalytical Analysis; Anticancer Efficacy Services; Immunology; Infectious Disease; Pathology; and Consulting.

== Drug discovery ==
Southern Research's Drug Discovery division conducts research focused on oncology, infectious disease, and neuroscience. Their current service areas include: High Throughput Screening (HTS), Chemistry, Oncology, Infectious Disease, Neuroscience, and the Center for Neuromolecular Research.

Southern Research is a founding member of the Alabama Drug Discovery Alliance (ADDA) along with the University of Alabama at Birmingham School of Medicine (SOM). The UAB Center for Clinical and Translational Science (CCTS), and the UAB Comprehensive Cancer Center (CCC) are also crucial contributors to the ADDA.

Mark J. Suto is vice president of Drug Discovery at Southern Research. He has been named a Fellow of the National Academy of Inventors (NAI) in recognition of his wide-ranging contributions to pharmaceutical research and drug discovery efforts.

=== Cancer research ===
Southern Research cancer research program was started in 1946 with a $25,000 philanthropic donation from Mobile, AL businessman, Ben E. May.

The organization's scientists are credited with the discovery of seven Food and Drug Administration (FDA) approved anti-cancer drugs, including carmustine, lomustine, dacarbazine developed by Y Fulmer Shealy, fludarabine, amifostine, clofarabine and the latest pralatrexate (approved in 2009). Notable cancer researchers who worked at the institute include Y Fulmer Shealy Howard E. Skipper, John Montgomery, Frank Schabel and Lee Bennett Jr.

Clofarabine is a nucleoside discovered at Southern Research that eventually received FDA approval. Clofarabine, a second-generation nucleoside analogue received accelerated approval from the US FDA at the end of 2004 for the treatment of paediatric patients 1–21 years old with relapsed or refractory acute lymphoblastic leukaemia after at least two prior regimens. It is the first such drug to be approved for paediatric leukaemia in more than a decade, and the first to receive approval for paediatric use before adult use.

Pralatrexate is another anticancer drug whose discovery was a result of contributions from medicinal chemists at Southern Research along with chemists from SRI International and Memorial Sloan-Kettering Cancer Center. The US FDA announced the approval of pralatrexate in 2009 for the treatment of relapsed or refractory peripheral T-cell lymphoma (PTCL). Research on drugs of this class began at SRI International in the 1950s. Pralatrexate was first prepared there by Dr. Joseph DeGraw and Dr. William Colwell. Dr. Robert Piper at Southern Research synthesized the key starting material (a bromomethyl compound) which was used to prepare the intermediates needed to make multigram quantities of high purity final compound. Multiple issued patents on this compound are jointly owned by Southern Research, SRI International and Memorial Sloan Kettering and licensed to Allos Therapeutics.

=== Molecular libraries program ===
MLP was founded by the NIH to fund research aimed at identifying new chemical probes against biological targets that might be amenable for drug therapy. Southern Research was one of eight extramural institutes selected for this initiative along with the Broad Institute, Sanford-Burnham Medical Research Institute, Johns Hopkins University, Scripps Research Institute, Vanderbilt University, University of New Mexico and the University of Kansas. In addition the MLP initiative also included an NIH intramural site: the National Center for Chemical Genomics (NCGC).

== Energy and environment ==
Southern Research's Energy & Environment division focuses on technology for clean energy, clean air, and clean water. Southern Research develops and tests air and water emissions control technologies for leading utilities, industrial manufacturers, municipal water utilities, and related trade organizations. The division has also historically partnered with private sector firms and government agencies to develop new technologies that transform energy generation, chemical synthesis, and air and water purification.

== Engineering ==
Southern Research engineers have worked with the National Aeronautics and Space Administration (NASA), the U.S. Military and other organizations.

Current areas include: Non destructive evaluation of materials; Chemistry and Physics of Materials; Electrical, EO/IR, and Mechanical Systems; Hypersonic Structures; Space Structures Characterization; Mechanical Testing of Materials Structures and Components; and Thermal Testing of Materials.

Michael D. Johns is the vice president of Engineering at Southern Research. He also serves on NASA Space Technology Mission Directorate's Technology, Innovation and Engineering Committee.

== AIMTech ==
In 2014, Southern Research and the University of Alabama at Birmingham formed the Alliance for Innovative Medical Technology (AIMTech) to develop new medical devices to improve healthcare.

The creation of medical devices are across all five specializations: Cardiology, Orthopedics, Ophthalmology, Rehabilitation and Trauma. The goal is for the first group of AIMTech-created medical devices to hit the market by 2020. By comparison, it can take 10 years to create an FDA approved drug.

In 2016, AIMTech was awarded a $500,000 U.S. Department of Commerce grant to expand medical device innovation and commercialization.

== Patents ==
- U.S. patent 5,384,310
- U.S. patent 5,661,136
