= Emil Frei =

American physician and oncologist

Emil Frei III
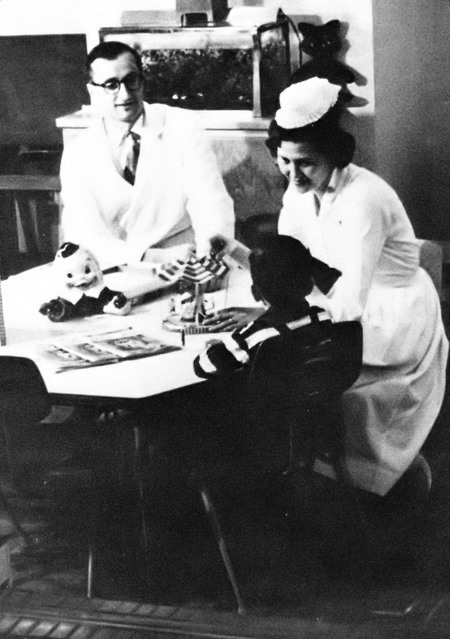
- Born: February 21, 1924; St. Louis, Missouri
- Died: April 30, 2013 (aged 89); Oak Park, Illinois
- Citizenship: United States
- Education: Colgate University; Yale School of Medicine
- Occupation: Physician
- Known for: Cancer research
- Spouse(s): Elizabeth Smith (nurse), 1948-1986 (her death); Adoria Brock, 1987-2009 (her death)
- Children: 5
- Scientific career
- Workplaces: National Cancer Institute; MD Anderson Cancer Center; Dana–Farber Cancer Institute

Emil "Tom" Frei III (February 21, 1924 – April 30, 2013) was an American physician and oncologist. He was the former director and former physician-in-chief of the Dana–Farber Cancer Institute in Boston, Massachusetts. He was also the Richard and Susan Smith Distinguished Professor of Medicine at Harvard Medical School.

== Early life and education ==
Frei was born in 1924 in St. Louis. His mother nicknamed him Tom after Tom Sawyer. His family owned the stained glass manufacturer Emil Frei & Associates.

He was inspired to study science after reading Hans Zinsser's book Rats, Lice and History. Frei completed an accelerated pre-med Colgate University in 1944 after only 2 years of study and his medical degree from Yale University in 1948.

== Career ==
He interned at Firmin Desloge Hospital, now St. Louis University Hospital in St. Louis, Missouri and served as a physician in the Korean War. He worked at the National Cancer Institute from 1955 to 1965 and the M. D. Anderson Cancer Center from 1965 to 1972; while at M.D. Anderson he was the founding director of the Department of Development Therapeutics, which evolved into the Clinical Research Center. He served as physician-in-chief at the Dana-Farber Institute from 1972 to 1991. He is best known for his work on the treatment of lymphomas and childhood and adult leukemia. His groundbreaking research into then-controversial combination chemotherapy, including the VAMP regimen, earned him many awards.

He coauthored Holland–Frei Cancer Medicine with James F. Holland.

=== Involvement in Cancer Cooperative Group Research ===
Frei was one of the founders of the Acute Leukemia Group B which later evolved into the Cancer and Leukemia Group B (CALGB). He served as the group chair for 16 years, from 1956 to 1963, and again from 1981 to 1990.

=== Journal of Clinical Oncology ===
He coined the Journal of Clinical Oncology in 1981, journal published first issue in 1983 in association with American Society of Clinical Oncology.

== Recognition ==
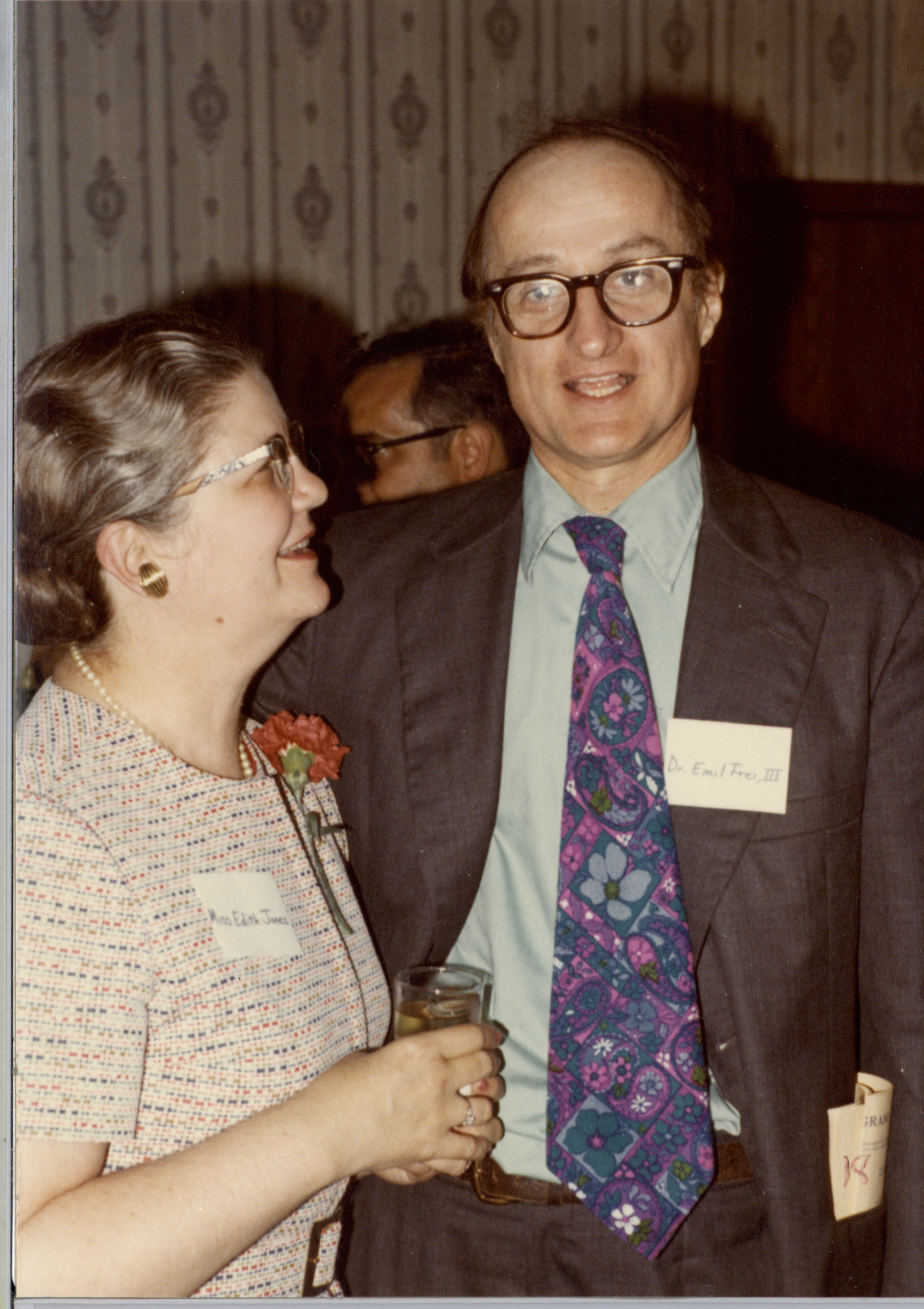
Dr. Emil Frei with Edna Jones in 1972

In 1972 he received the Lasker-DeBakey Clinical Medical Research Award from the Lasker Foundation "for his outstanding contribution in application of the concept of combination chemotherapy for lymphoma and acute adult leukemia." Other awards included the Jeffrey A. Gottlieb Memorial Award (1978); NIH Distinguished Alumni Award (1990); Fellow, American Academy of Arts and Sciences (1999); Pollin Prize for Pediatric Research (2003); and AARC Lifetime Achievement Award (2004).

- 2013 Fellow of the AACR Academy
- 2004 AACR Lifetime Achievement Award
- 1999 Elected Fellow, American Academy of Arts and Sciences
- 1997 Elected Member, Institute of Medicine
- 1990 First NIH Distinguished Alumni Award
- 1989 Armand Hammer Award
- 1985 Hamao Umezawa Award, International Society of Chemotherapy, Infection and Cancer
- 1983 Charles F. Kettering Prize, General Motors Cancer Research Foundation
- 1981 Golden Plate Award of the American Academy of Achievement
- 1980 Elected fellow of the American College of Physicians
- 1972 Lasker-DeBakey Clinical Medical Research Award
- 1971 President, AACR
- 1968 President, American Society of Clinical Oncology

== Death ==
Frei died of Parkinson's disease at his home in Oak Park, Illinois on April 30, 2013. He was 89.

== See also ==
- History of cancer chemotherapy
