= North Central Cancer Treatment Group =

Research organization

The North Central Cancer Treatment Group (NCCTG) is an international clinical research group sponsored by the National Cancer Institute. The NCCTG consists of a network of cancer specialists at community clinics, hospitals and medical centers in the United States, Canada and Mexico. The research base for NCCTG is located at Mayo Clinic in Rochester, Minnesota.
