= Children's Oncology Group =

American clinical trials group

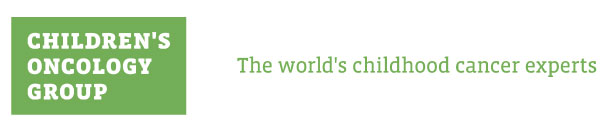
Logo

The Children's Oncology Group (COG), a clinical trials group supported by the National Cancer Institute (NCI), is the world's largest organization devoted exclusively to pediatric cancer research. The COG conducts a spectrum of clinical research and translational research trials for infants, children, adolescents, and young adults with cancer.

Almost all centers that treat children with cancer in the US and Canada are part of the COG, with more than 200 centers in the United States, Canada, Switzerland, the Netherlands, Australia, and New Zealand. The member institutions have multidisciplinary teams consisting of physicians, research scientists, nurses, psychologists, pharmacists and other specialists.

The group, with more than 7,500 experts worldwide, has nearly 100 active clinical-translational trials open at any given time. These trials include treatment for many types of childhood cancers, studies aimed at determining the underlying biology of these diseases, and trials involving new and emerging treatments, supportive care, and survivorship. More than 90% of 13,500 children and adolescents diagnosed with cancer each year in the United States are cared for at COG member institutions.

== History ==
The cooperative group system for clinical research began in 1955 with a consortium focused on childhood cancer research. By the mid-1990s, there were nine groups funded by the NCI to conduct research in adults with cancer, and four focused on childhood cancer research. Two groups, the Children's Cancer Study Group (CCG) and the Pediatric Oncology Group (POG) studied a diverse array of childhood cancers, while two others, the Intergroup Rhabdomyosarcoma Study Group (IRSG) and the National Wilms Tumor Study Group (NWTS) were specific for particular cancers. In 2000, the four pediatric groups merged to create the Children's Oncology Group. Since then, its researchers have published well over one thousand research manuscripts in peer-reviewed scientific journals. COG has enrolled more children with cancer on clinical trials than any other organization in the world.

== Research studies ==
The group's research studies encompass hematologic malignancies, solid tumors, central nervous system tumors, and rare cancers. Hematologic malignancies include the most common childhood cancer, acute lymphoblastic leukemia, as well as acute myeloid leukemia, non-Hodgkin lymphoma, and Hodgkin lymphoma. Pediatric solid tumors studied include neuroblastoma, tumors of bone (Ewing sarcoma, osteosarcoma), tumors of the kidney (Wilms' tumor), rhabdomyosarcoma and other soft tissue sarcomas. Central nervous system (brain) tumors are the second most common form of childhood cancer. COG conducts research in children with medulloblastoma, ependymoma, brainstem gliomas, low and high-grade gliomas, and germ cell tumors. The large multi-site structure of COG also allows it to conduct research into very rare childhood cancer including retinoblastoma, hepatoblastoma, and other tumors.

In addition to disease specific research, COG conducts studies in developmental therapeutics (new cancer drug development), supportive care, epidemiology, stem cell transplantation, behavioral sciences and survivorship.

== Funding ==
The COG is primarily funded by the NCI, the primary or Chair's grant supports research operations and funds personnel at member institutions conducting research, and the statistics and data center grant supports these essential research functions. Other key grants include the COG Phase 1 Consortium grant, supporting 21 COG institutions charged with early phase clinical trials, and the Community Cancer Oncology Program (CCOP) grant. There is additional funding from other granting agencies and from philanthropic sources.
