= Environmental suit =

Clothing worn to protect a person in a hostile environment

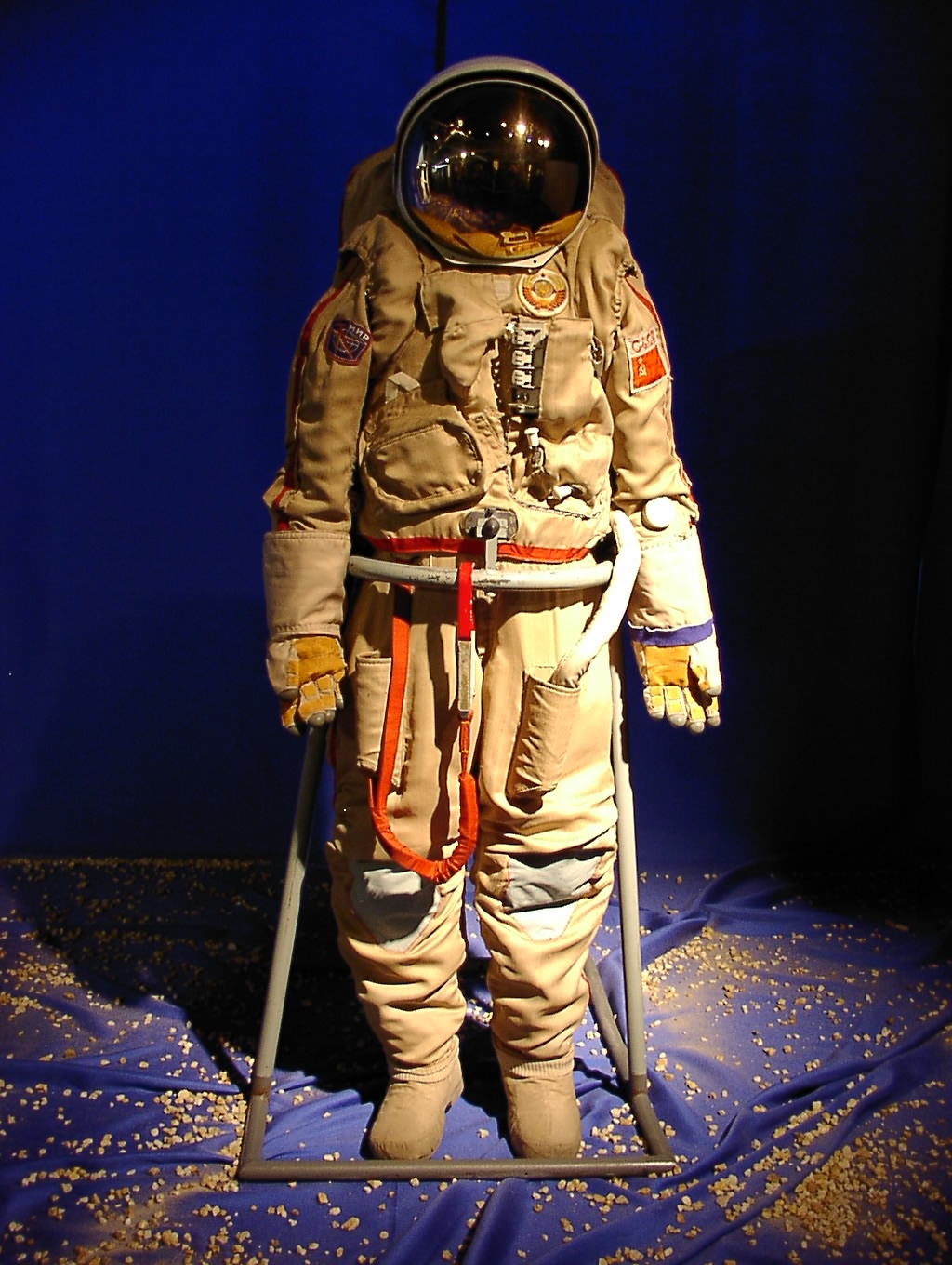
Soviet space suit

An environmental suit is a suit designed specifically for a particular environment, usually one otherwise hostile to humans. An environment suit is typically a one-piece garment, and many types also feature a helmet or other covering for the head. Where the surrounding environment is especially dangerous the suit is completely sealed.

The first environmental suits were diving suits designed to protect a diver from the surrounding water (see timeline of underwater technology). Later developments were designed to protect the wearer from the cold (for example wetsuits and other ambient pressure suits) or from undersea high pressure and the resulting decompression sickness (for example atmospheric diving suits). Protecting the wearer from cold is also a feature of ski suits.

In aviation, pressure suits protect fighter pilots from hypoxia / altitude sickness, and g-suits from the adverse effects of acceleration (gravity-induced loss of consciousness, or G-LOC). The most extreme environmental suits are used by astronauts to protect them during ascent and while in the vacuum of space: space suits and space activity suits. Such suits are self-supporting, and include a supply of oxygen for the wearer.

Environmental suits are also used to protect the wearer from contamination (for example hazmat suits), or conversely to protect the environment from contamination by the wearer (see cleanroom suits). The concept of an environmental suit protecting someone from contamination is a feature of the boy in the bubble trope: both David Vetter and Ted DeVita at some point used such suits.

== See also ==
- Personal protective equipment
- Atmospheric diving suit
- Extreme cold weather clothing
- Fire Resistant Environmental Ensemble
- Space suit
