= DeVita =

DeVita or De Vita is a surname of Italian origin. It may refer to:

- Elizabeth DeVita-Raeburn, American author and journalist
- Franco De Vita, Venezuelan singer
- Rob DeVita (born 1965), American football player
- Ted DeVita (1962–1980), victim of anemia
- Vincent T. DeVita, American physician in oncology
- DeVita (singer), Korean-American singer-songwriter
