= The Cancer Journal =

- Discipline: Oncology
- Language: English
- Edited by: Vincent T. DeVita, Theodore Lawrence, Steven Rosenberg

Publication details
- Former name(s): The Cancer Journal from Scientific American
- History: 1995-present
- Publisher: Lippincott Williams & Wilkins
- Frequency: Bimonthly
- Impact factor: 2.6 (2023)

Standard abbreviations
- ISO 4: Cancer J.

Indexing
- CODEN: CAJOCB
- ISSN: 1528-9117 (print); 1540-336X (web)
- LCCN: 00211647
- OCLC no.: 43551525

Links
- Journal homepage; Online access; Online archive

The Cancer Journal: The Journal of Principles & Practice of Oncology is a bimonthly peer-reviewed medical journal covering oncology. It was established in 1995 as The Cancer Journal from Scientific American by Scientific American, but is now published by Lippincott Williams & Wilkins under the new name since 2000. The editors-in-chief are Vincent T. DeVita (Yale Cancer Center), Theodore S. Lawrence (University of Michigan), and Steven Rosenberg (National Cancer Institute). According to the Journal Citation Reports, the journal has a 2022 impact factor of 2.2, ranking it 199th out of 241 journals in the category "Oncology".
