= Bubble Boy =

Bubble boy, boy in the bubble or boy in the plastic bubble may refer to:

- Severe combined immunodeficiency (also bubble boy disease), a rare genetic disorder characterized by the disturbed development of functional T cells and B cells
- David Vetter (1971–1984; also "the bubble boy"), American who was a prominent sufferer of severe combined immunodeficiency who was forced to live in a sterile room
- Ted DeVita (1962–1980), a prominent sufferer of severe aplastic anaemia who was also forced to live in a sterile hospital room

== Arts ==
- The Boy in the Plastic Bubble, a 1976 American made for television drama film inspired by the lives of David Vetter and Ted DeVita
- "The Boy in the Bubble", a 1987 song by the American singer-songwriter Paul Simon
- "The Bubble Boy" (Seinfeld), 1992, the 47th episode of the American sitcom Seinfeld
- The Boy in the Bubble (novel), a 1994 book by Ian Strachan
- Bubble Boy (film), a 2001 American comedy film directed by Blair Hayes
  - Bubble Boy (musical), a 2013 musical based on the film, with music and lyrics by Cinco Paul
- "Lying Around the House / Bubble Boy", 2004, the 60th episode of the American superhero animated television series The Powerpuff Girls
