= Vincent T. DeVita =

American oncologist and academic

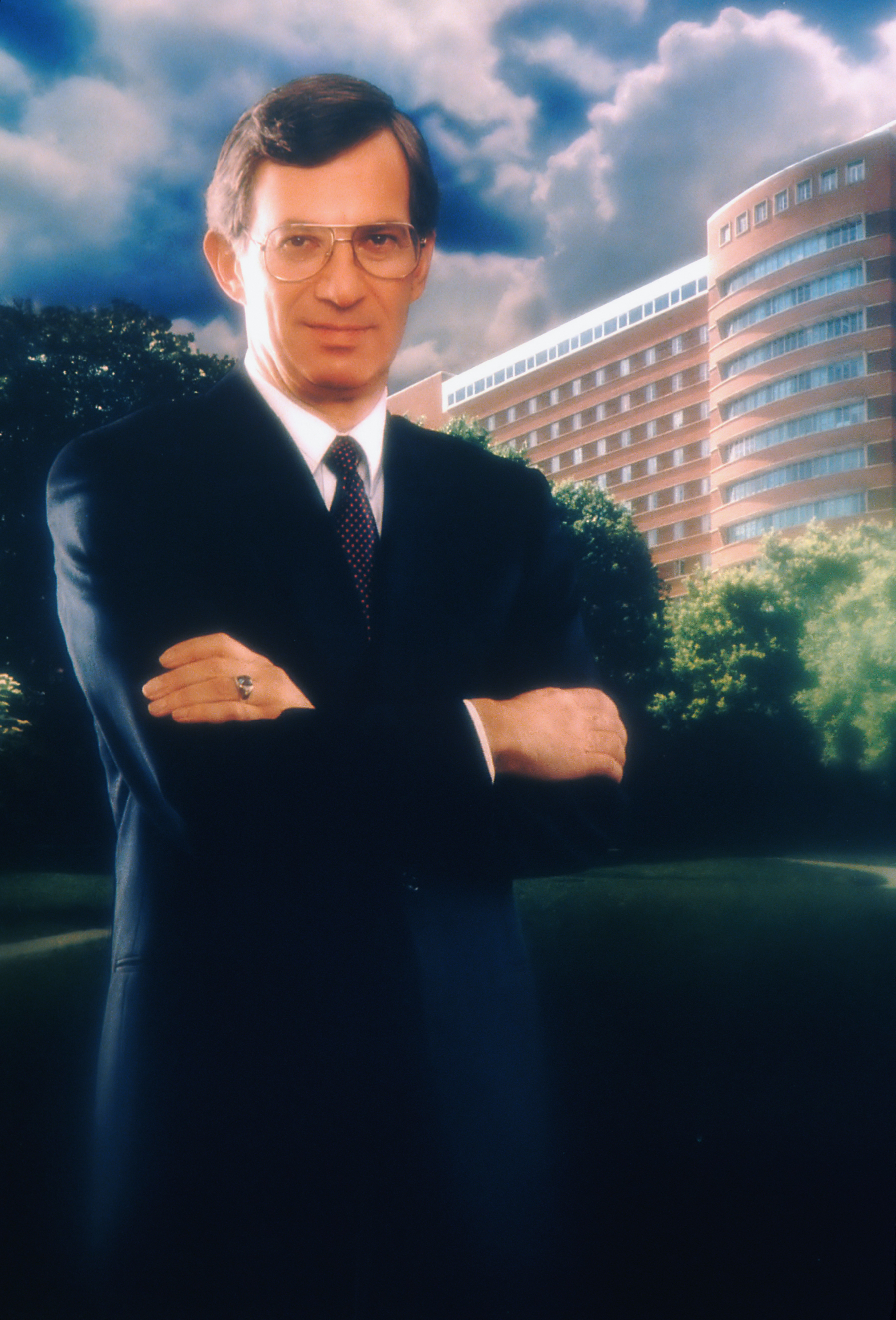
- DeVita in 1999
- Born: Vincent Theodore DeVita Jr. March 7, 1935 (age 91)
- Education: College of William & Mary (BS); George Washington University (MD)
- Spouse: Mary Kay Bush
- Children: Ted DeVita; Elizabeth DeVita
- Relatives: Paul Raeburn (son-in-law)

Vincent Theodore DeVita Jr. (born March 7, 1935) is the Amy and Joseph Perella Professor of Medicine at Yale Cancer Center, and a Professor of Epidemiology and Public Health. He directed the Yale Cancer Center from 1993 to 2003. He has been president of the board of directors of the American Cancer Society (2012-2013). He is internationally recognized as a pioneer in the field of oncology for his work on combination-chemotherapy treatments.

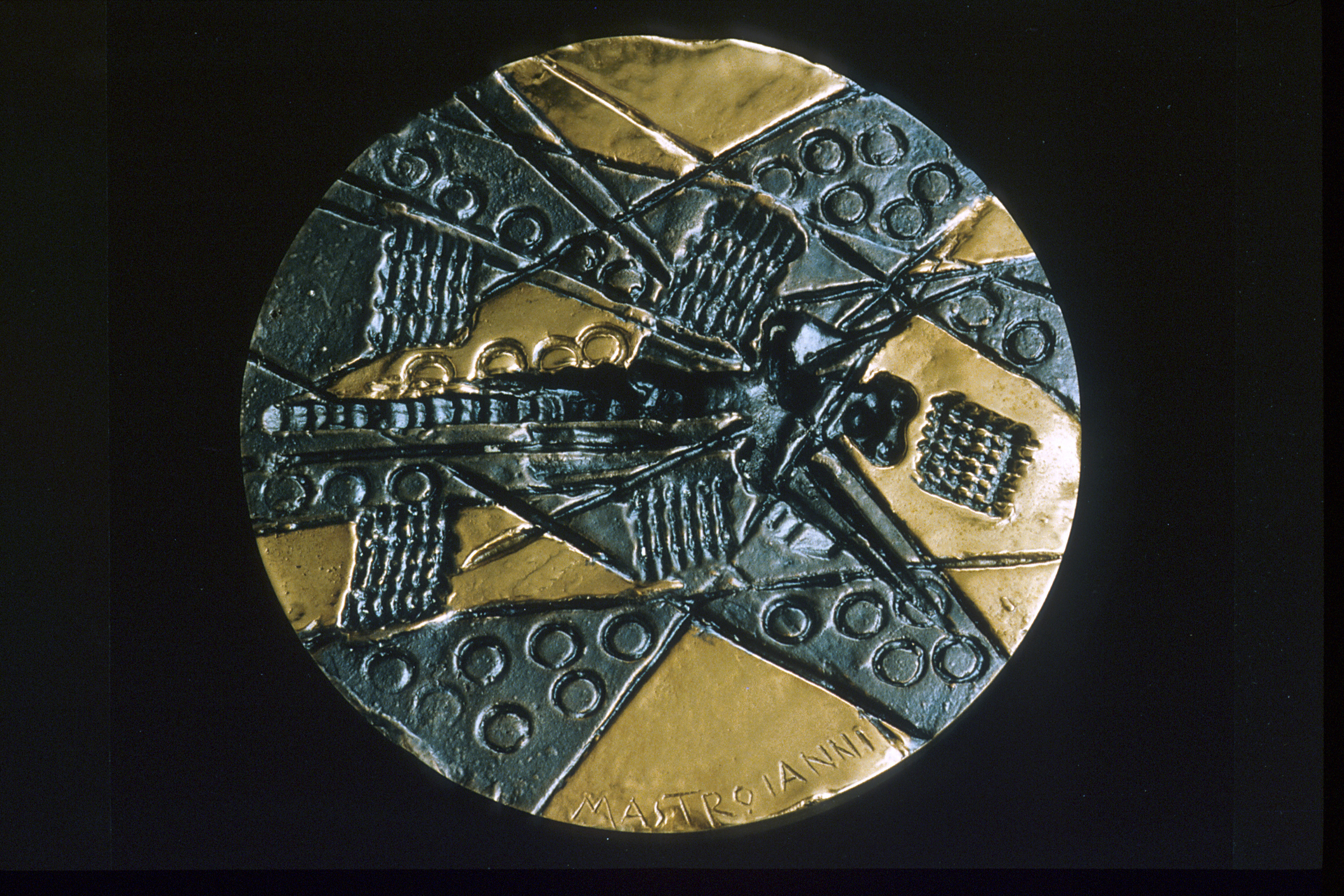
The Pier Luigi Nervi International Award for Cancer Research that DeVita received in 1985

== Early life and education ==
Vincent DeVita was born in The Bronx, New York.

DeVita attended the College of William & Mary, receiving his Bachelor of Science degree in 1957. In 1961 he earned his MD degree with distinction from the George Washington University School of Medicine & Health Sciences.

== Career ==
DeVita joined the National Cancer Institute (NCI) in 1963 as a clinical fellow, working with Emil "Tom" Frei, Emil J. Freireich and others. He returned as a senior investigator in 1966 after completing his training at Yale-New Haven Medical Center in 1965. At NCI, DeVita held the following posts: Senior Investigator in the Solid Tumor Service, Head of the Solid Tumor Service, Chief of the Medicine Branch, Director of the Division of Cancer Treatment and Clinical Director of NCI (as of 1975).

While at NCI, he helped to develop MOPP, a four-drug combination that was the first successful combination chemotherapy program. At the time, many oncologists believed such an approach was too toxic and would do more harm than good. MOPP was used to treat Hodgkin's disease and diffuse large cell lymphomas, reducing the likelihood of dying from Hodgkin's disease from nearly 100% to around 30%. DeVita's results, presented in 1965 and 1970 were initially viewed with considerable disbelief. By demonstrating that a combination-chemotherapy regimen could be successful, DeVita established the basis for further combination therapies, which became a mainstay of cancer treatment. In addition, in collaboration with George Canellos, DeVita developed the combination chemotherapy CMF, which still remains a useful therapy for breast cancer.

From 1977 to 1978, DeVita was the president of the American Society of Clinical Oncology (ASCO).

In 1980, DeVita was appointed Director of the NCI and the National Cancer Program by President Jimmy Carter, a position he held until 1988.

From January 1989 to 1993, DeVita was Physician-in-Chief and Attending Physician at Memorial Sloan Kettering Cancer Center where he was part of the program for Molecular Pharmacology.

In 1993 he returned to Yale, where he became Director of Yale Cancer Center, serving from 1993 to 2003. In 2004, he was named as the Amy and Joseph Perella Professor of Medicine at Yale University, a position to be renamed the Vincent T. DeVita Professor of Medicine after his tenure. He is currently the chair of the Yale Cancer Center advisory board and is professor of internal medicine and of epidemiology and public health at Yale's medical school.

From 2012-2013, DeVita served as president of the board of directors of the American Cancer Society. DeVita currently serves on the editorial boards of numerous scientific journals and has authored over 450 scientific articles. He is a co-editor of the textbook Cancer: Principles and Practice of Oncology, in its 10th edition, and serves as the co-editor-in-chief of The Cancer Journal.

He is also the co-author, with his daughter Elizabeth DeVita-Raeburn, of the autobiographical book, The Death of Cancer: After Fifty Years on the Front Lines of Medicine, a Pioneering Oncologist Reveals Why the War on Cancer Is Winnable—and How We Can Get There.

He was a participant in Ken Burns' 2015 PBS documentary Cancer: The Emperor of All Maladies, which was based on the Pulitzer Prize-winning book by Siddhartha Mukherjee.

== Personal life ==
DeVita married Mary Kay Bush, with whom he had two children, Ted and Elizabeth. DeVita diagnosed his son Ted's aplastic anemia. Ted thereafter was placed in a sterile environment for his safety and died in 1980.

Ted's situation, and that of David Vetter, inspired the 1976 TV movie The Boy in the Plastic Bubble starring John Travolta. Elizabeth has written about the experience of losing her brother in The Empty Room.

DeVita has been treated for prostate cancer.

== Awards ==
- 1972, Albert Lasker Clinical Research Award
- 2007, Statesman Award, American Society of Clinical Oncology (ASCO)
- 2007, FREDDIE Special Award for Public Service
- 2009, Distinguished Medical Science Award, Friends of the National Library of Medicine
- 2014, fellow, American Association for Cancer Research

== Bibliography ==
- DeVita, Vincent T. Jr.; DeVita-Raeburn, Elizabeth (2015). The Death of Cancer: After Fifty Years on the Front Lines of Medicine, a Pioneering Oncologist Reveals Why the War on Cancer Is Winnable--and How We Can Get There. New York: Sarah Crichton Books/Farrar, Straus and Giroux. ISBN 9780374536480.
- Mukherjee, Siddhartha (2011). The emperor of all maladies : a biography of cancer (1st Scribner ed.). New York: Scribner. ISBN 978-1439170915.

== See also ==
- Cancer (2015 PBS film)
- History of cancer
- History of cancer chemotherapy
