= Elizabeth DeVita-Raeburn =

American journalist

- Born: Elizabeth DeVita; 1966 (age 59–60); Maryland, United States
- Spouse: Paul Raeburn
- Children: 2
- Father: Vincent T. DeVita
- Relatives: Ted DeVita (brother)

Elizabeth DeVita-Raeburn is an American author and journalist who covers science, health, and society. She is the author of The Empty Room, a memoir of the death of her older brother, Ted DeVita, who lived for eight years in a plastic bubble at the National Institute of Health Clinical Center before dying of iron overload from the transfusions he had as treatment of his severe immune disorder at the age of 17. Her father is Dr. Vincent T. DeVita.

DeVita-Raeburn has a master's degree in public health from Columbia University. Her stories have appeared in The Washington Post, Self, Glamour, Health, Psychology Today and Harper's Bazaar, among many other publications. She is the coauthor of The Death of Cancer (FSG, 2015). Devita-Raeburn currently works at Everyday Health as the senior cancer editor. In 2017, she was chosen as a National Cancer Institute fellow. She lives in New York with her sons, Henry and Luke.

== See also ==
- Ted DeVita
- David Vetter
- Bubble Boy (disambiguation)
