= Crystal Denlinger =

American medical oncologist

- Born: 1975 (age 50–51) (Note: In 2014, Denlinger was reported to be 38); New Jersey, US

Academic background
- Education: MD, 2001, New Jersey Medical School

Crystal Denlinger (born 1975) is an American medical oncologist. In 2021, she was appointed the Chief Scientific Officer of the National Comprehensive Cancer Network.

== Early life and education ==
Denlinger was born to parents Edgar and Cynthia in New Jersey and grew up alongside her brother Craig. She obtained her medical degree from New Jersey Medical School and completed her internal medicine residency at Mount Sinai Medical Center. Following this, she completed her fellowship in hematology/oncology at Temple University's Fox Chase Cancer Center. Denlinger later said that she chose to pursue a career in oncology after her father was diagnosed with kidney cancer.

== Career ==
Upon completing her formal education, Denlinger joined the faculty at Fox Chase Cancer Center. While serving as an associate professor, Denlinger became a founding member of the National Comprehensive Cancer Network (NCCN)'s Survivorship Guideline panel and spearheaded the development of the Center for Survivorship at Fox Chase.

While flying to the NCCN's 19th Annual Conference in March 2014, Denlinger's plane crashed on the runway following takeoff. She bordered another flight six hours later to reach the conference in time. At the conference, Denlinger presented with Terry S. Langbaum on the topic of patients and providers' care and surveillance following cancer. She was originally scheduled to present a poster study but left that on the plane when she was evacuated. A few years later, Denlinger became the first and only NCCN Panel chair who began her relationship with NCCN as a participant in the NCCN Fellows Program. In 2018, her efforts were honored by the NCCN with their Rodger Winn Award.

During the COVID-19 pandemic, Denlinger was named the Chief Scientific Officer for National Comprehensive Cancer Network.
