= ABMT =

ABMT may refer to:

- Anti-Ballistic Missile Treaty
- Autologous bone marrow transplant, a part of High-dose chemotherapy and bone marrow transplant
- American Board of Medical Toxicology, a precursor to the American College of Medical Toxicology
