= Journal of the National Comprehensive Cancer Network =

Medical journal

- Discipline: Oncology
- Language: English
- Edited by: Daniel M. Geynisman

Publication details
- History: 2003-present
- Publisher: Harborside Press (United States)
- Frequency: Monthly
- Impact factor: 16.4 (2024)

Standard abbreviations
- ISO 4: J. Natl. Compr. Cancer Netw.

Indexing
- CODEN: JNCCN
- ISSN: 1540-1405 (print); 1540-1413 (web)
- LCCN: 2002214208
- OCLC no.: 49849425

Links
- Journal homepage; Online access; Online archive

The Journal of the National Comprehensive Cancer Network, established in 2003, is a monthly peer-reviewed medical journal of oncology and the official journal of the National Comprehensive Cancer Network (NCCN). It is published by Harborside Press and the editor-in-chief is Daniel M. Geynisman (Fox Chase Cancer Center). It publishes the NCCN Clinical Practice Guidelines in Oncology, updates and review articles elaborating on guideline recommendations, and health services and clinical research papers, as well as correspondence and commentaries.

== Abstracting and indexing ==
The journal is abstracted and indexed in:

- Current Contents/Clinical Medicine
- MEDLINE
- PubMed
- Science Citation Index Expanded

According to the Journal Citation Reports, the journal has a 2024 impact factor of 16.4.
