= Marine Corps Combat Utility Uniform =

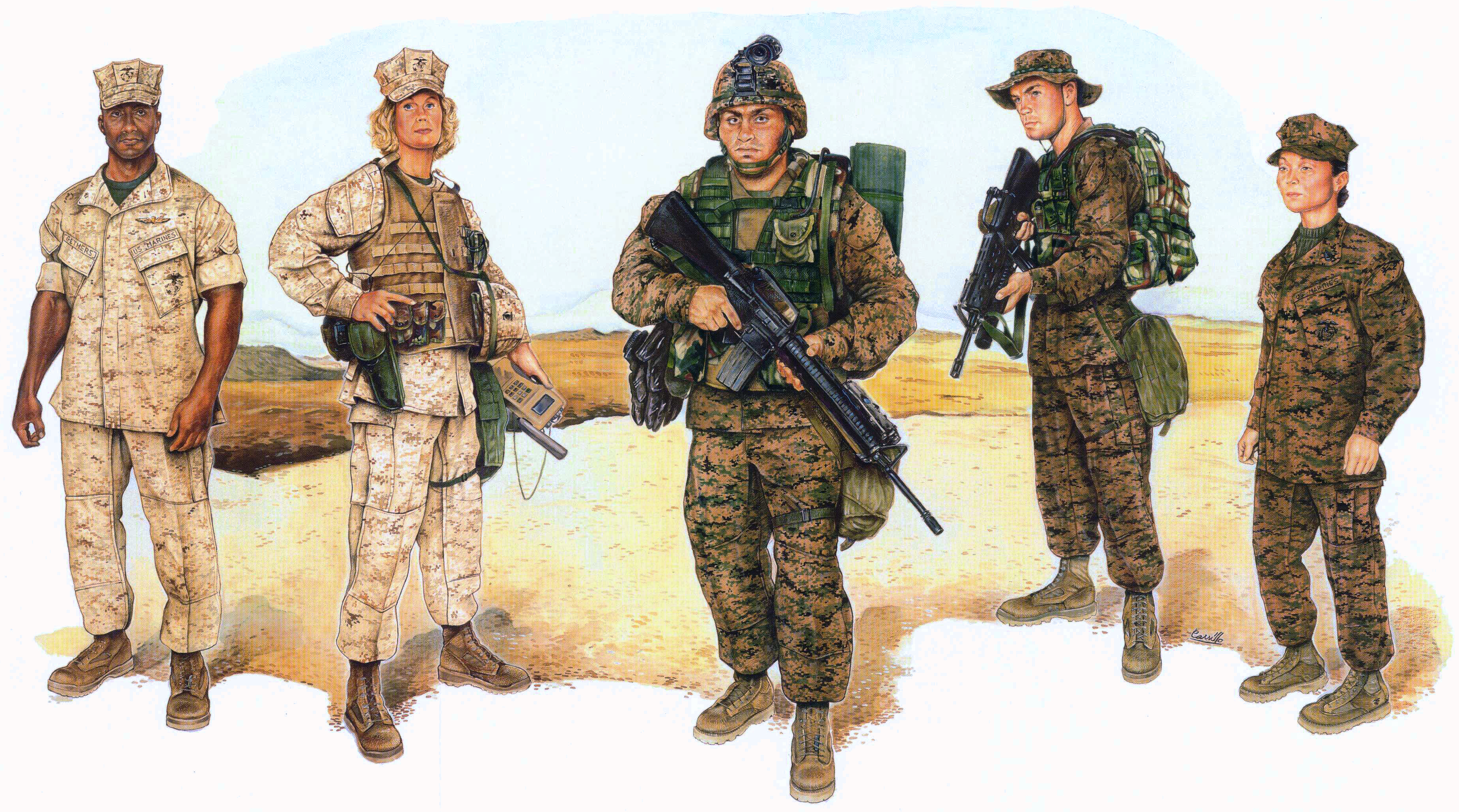
- A 2003 drawing depicting U.S. Marines wearing the Marine Corps Combat Utility Uniform in desert and woodland-camouflaged variants
- Type: Uniform
- Place of origin: United States

Service history
- In service: 2002–present
- Used by: U.S. Marine Corps (including USMCR and MCJROTC); U.S. Navy (primarily corpsmen, chaplains, and Religious program specialist); New York Naval Militia; Texas Maritime Regiment
- Wars: War in Afghanistan; Iraq War

Production history
- Designer: Propper International and American Power Source
- Designed: 2001
- Unit cost: $77.00 (MSRP in 2002, minus boots)
- Produced: 2001–present
- Variants: Flame Resistant Organizational Gear

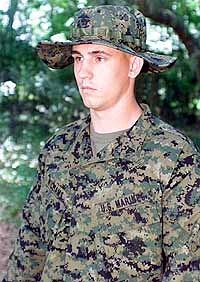
A U.S. Marine wearing the MCCUU in woodland MARPAT in 2001

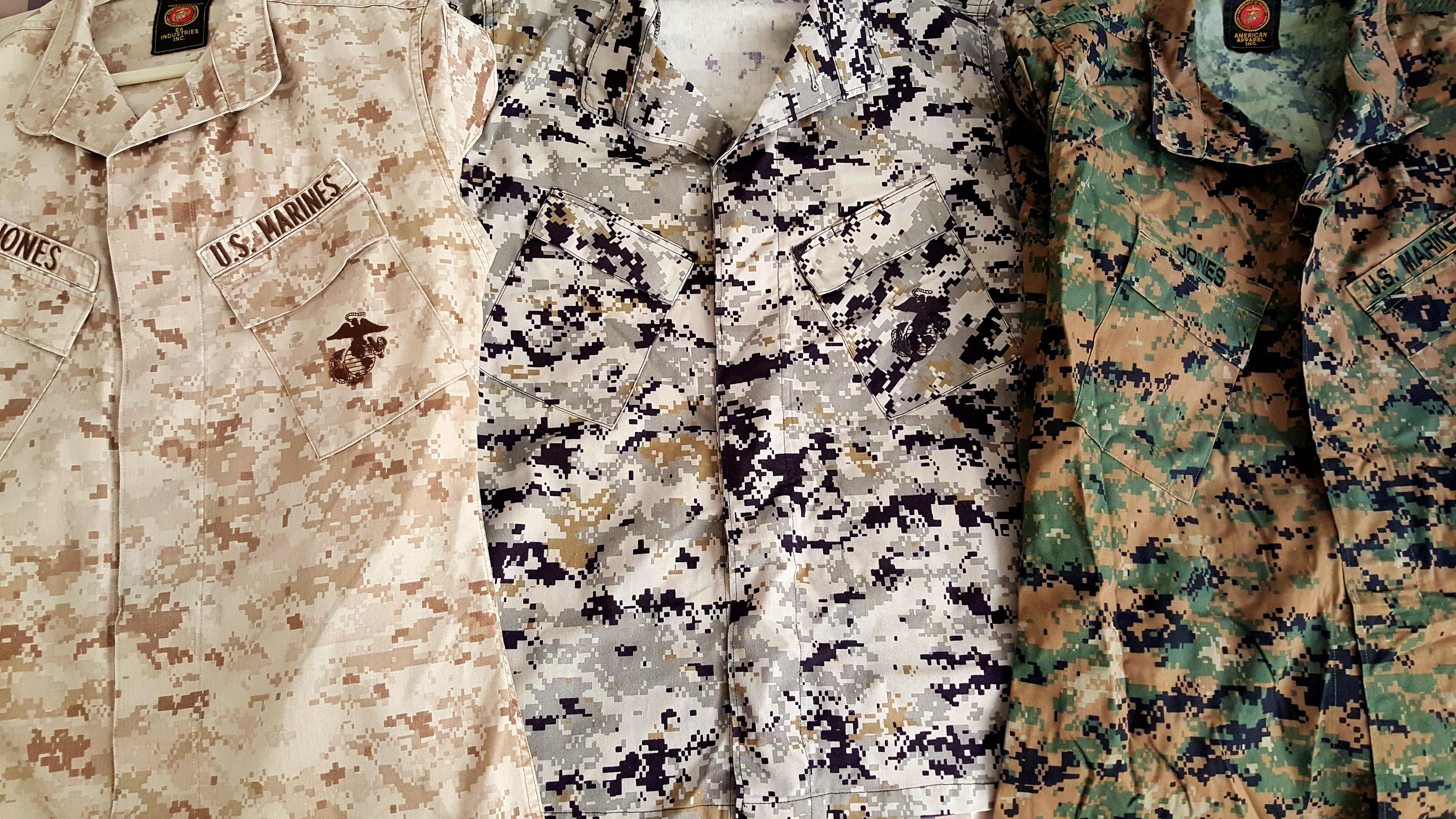
Desert, Urban, Woodland MCCUU

The Marine Corps Combat Utility Uniform (MCCUU) is the current battledress uniform of the United States Marine Corps. It is also worn by Navy personnel (mostly corpsmen, Seabees, chaplains, and their bodyguards) assigned to Marine Corps units (e.g. the Fleet Marine Force).

It replaced the Battle Dress Uniform, which the Marine Corps had shared with the Navy, Army and Air Force. However, both the MCCUU, and its distinctive camouflage pattern, MARPAT, are exclusive to the Marine Corps, which holds the patents to their design. The uniform is available in two color schemes, woodland and desert. The MCCUU should not be confused with the similar looking FROG uniform.

== Development ==
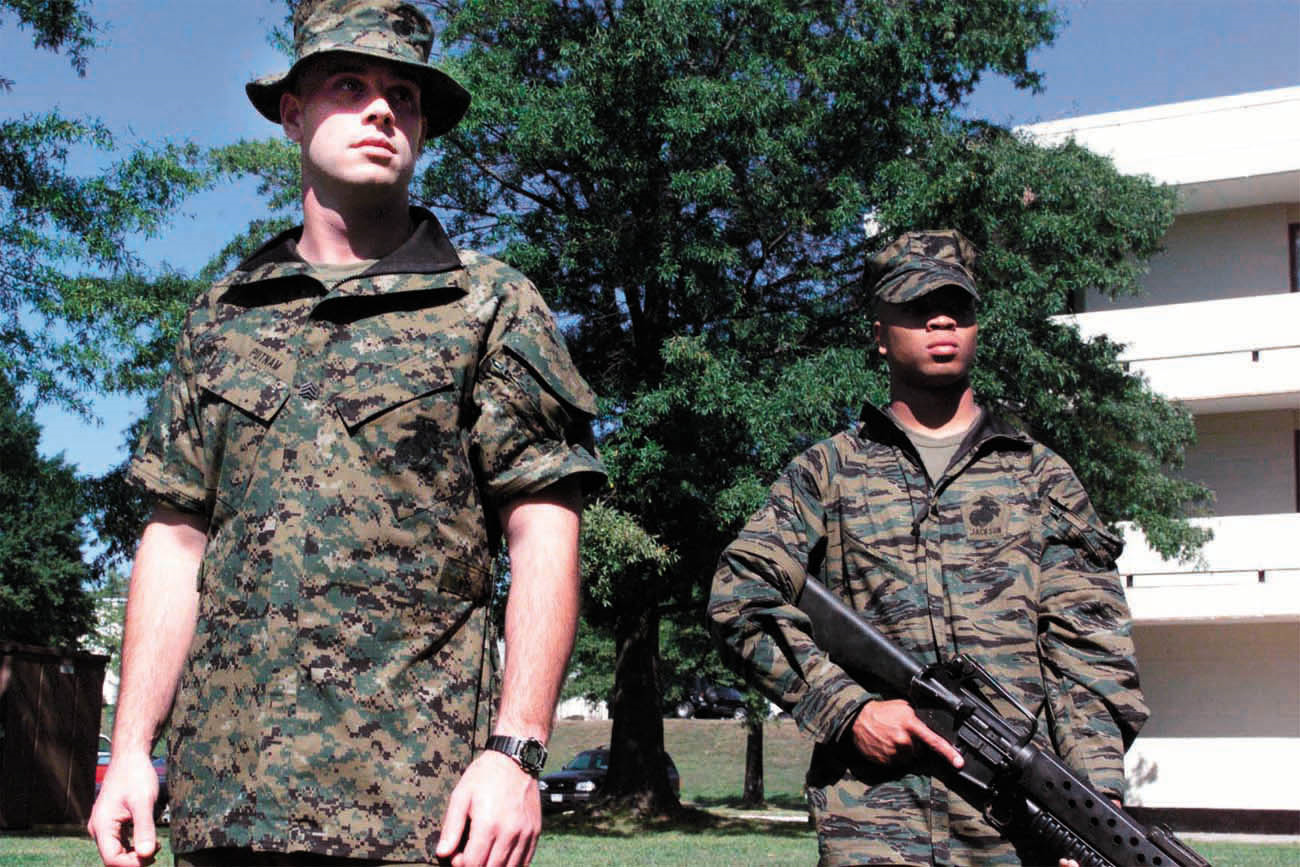
Two U.S. Marines test out early predecessors to the MCCUU in 2001. The two prototypes feature removable sleeves, a feature that was later abandoned on the finished production version.

Field testing of the MCCUU began in early 2001 and was officially announced to the public in June 2001. Early prototypes had featured removable sleeves, but that design feature was later abandoned. The patent for the MARPAT pattern was filed on June 19, 2001, whereas the patent for the MCCUU uniform was filed on November 7, 2001. The uniform made its official debut at a base exchange at Camp Lejeune, North Carolina on January 17, 2002, and began being issued to Marine Corps recruits in June 2002. The changeover was completed on October 1, 2004 (with a few exceptions of April 1, 2005), a year ahead of the original deadline date set in 2001 of October 1, 2005.

The early prototypes of the MCCUU were designed by Propper International and American Power Source.

== Design features ==
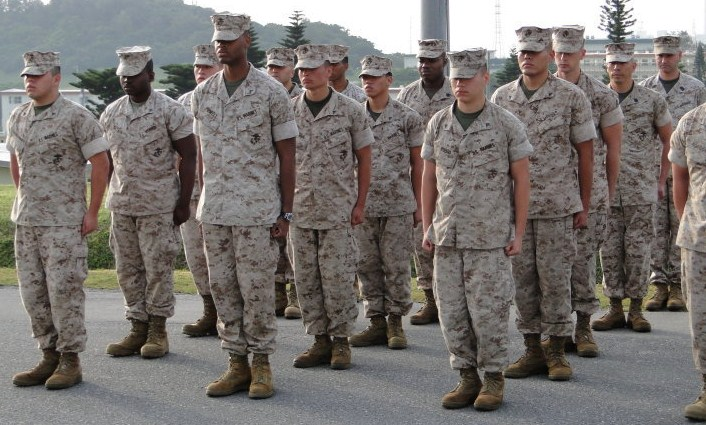
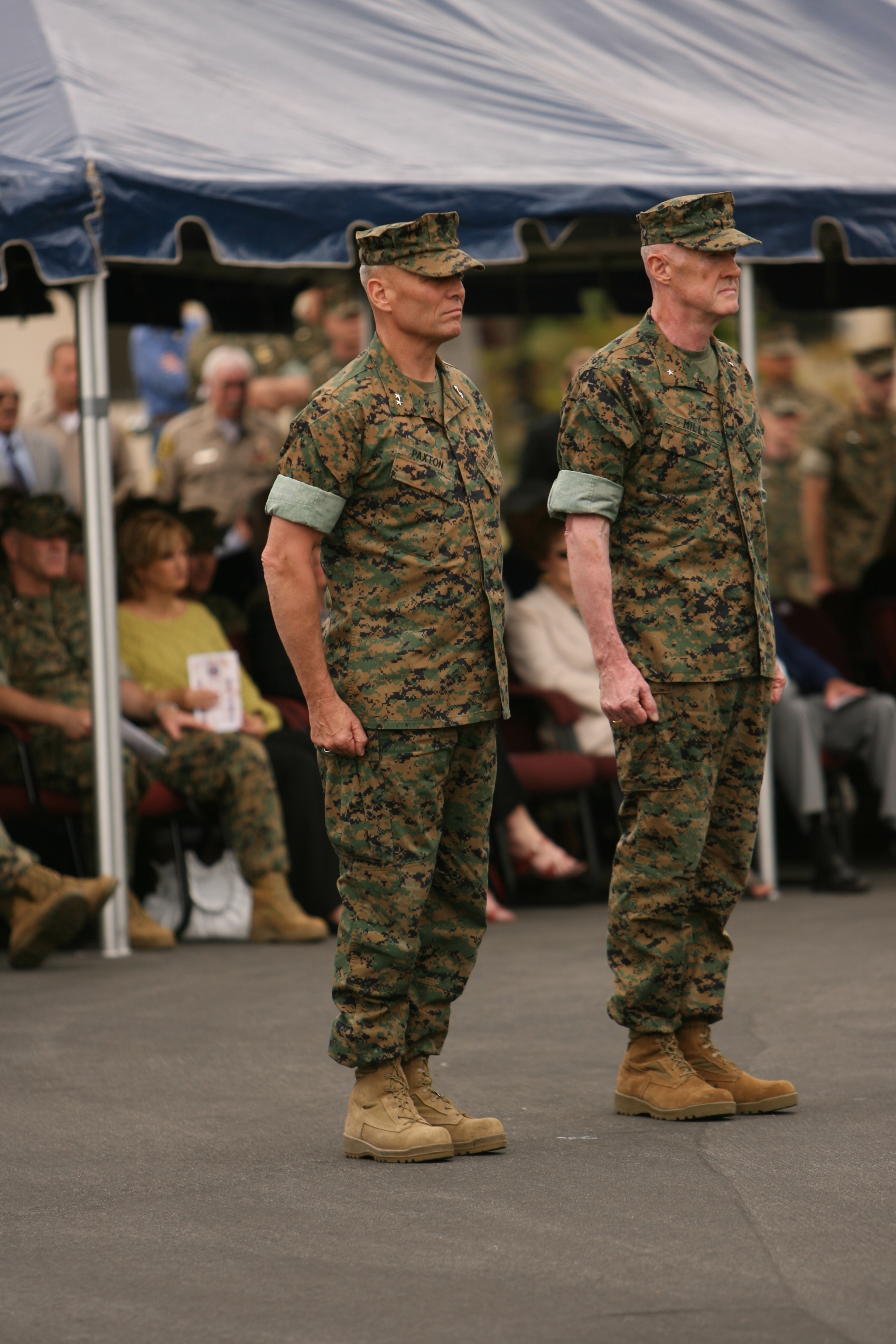
U.S. Marines wearing the MCCUU in garrison, with sleeves rolled and utility covers
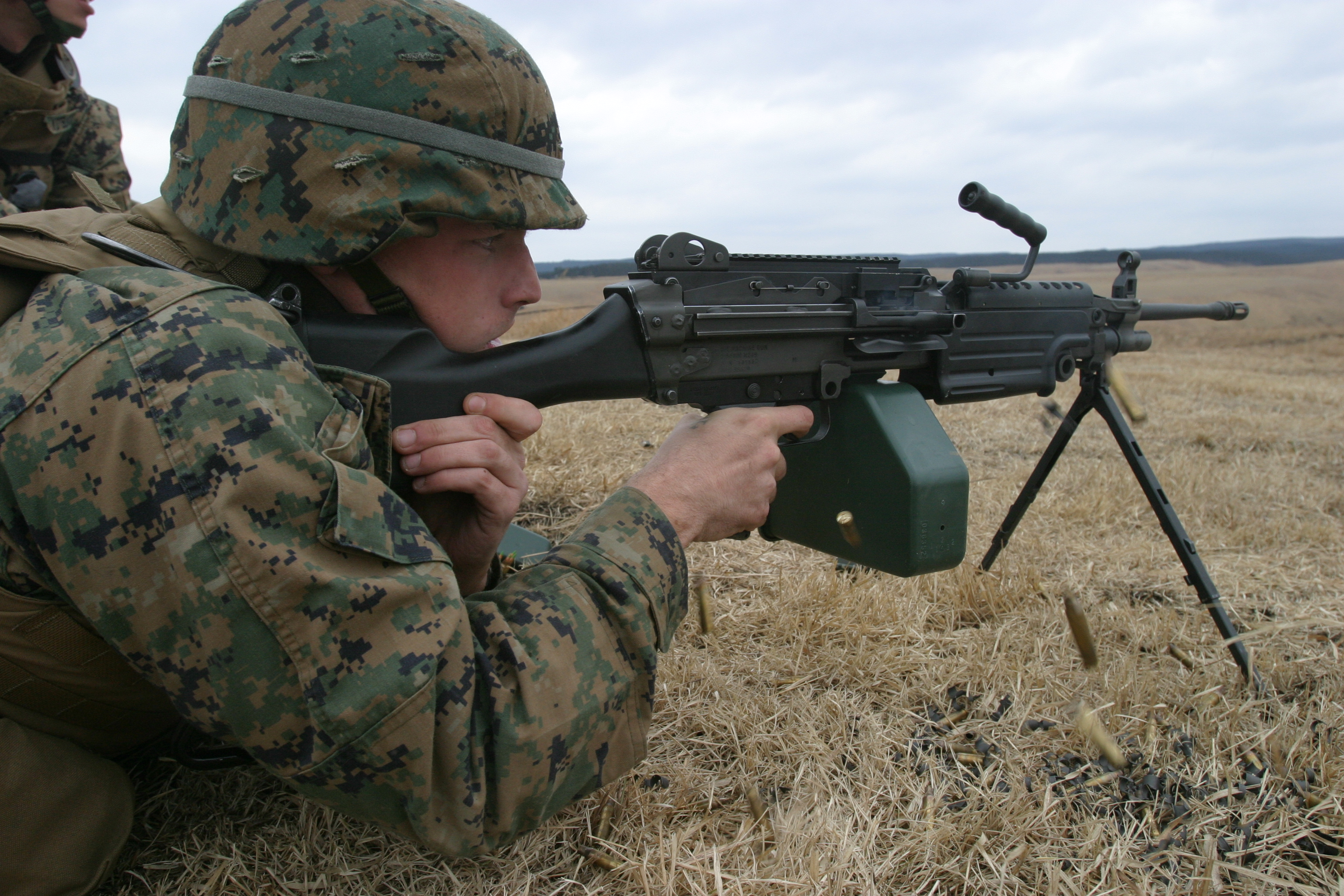
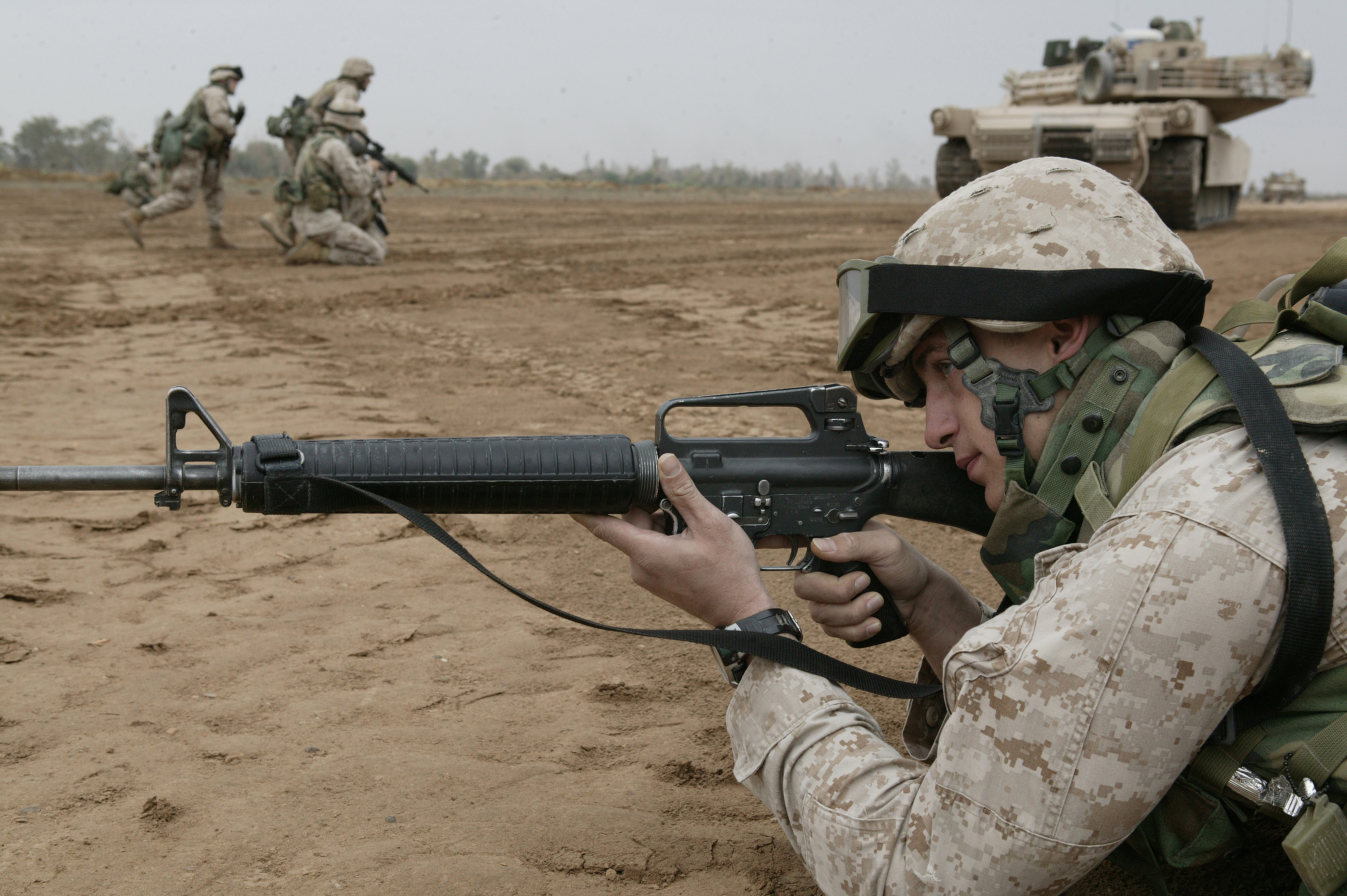
U.S. Marines wearing the MCCUU with combat equipment

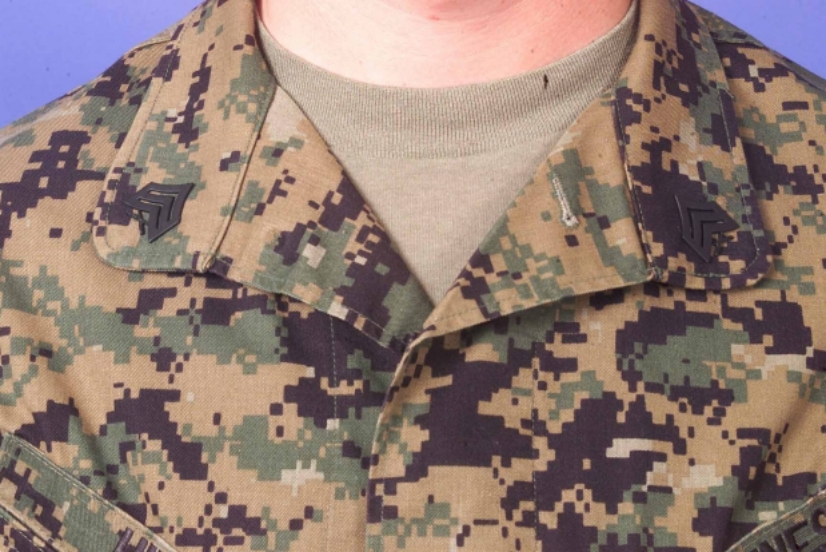
The collar of an MCCUU, being worn by a U.S. Marine sergeant in 2002

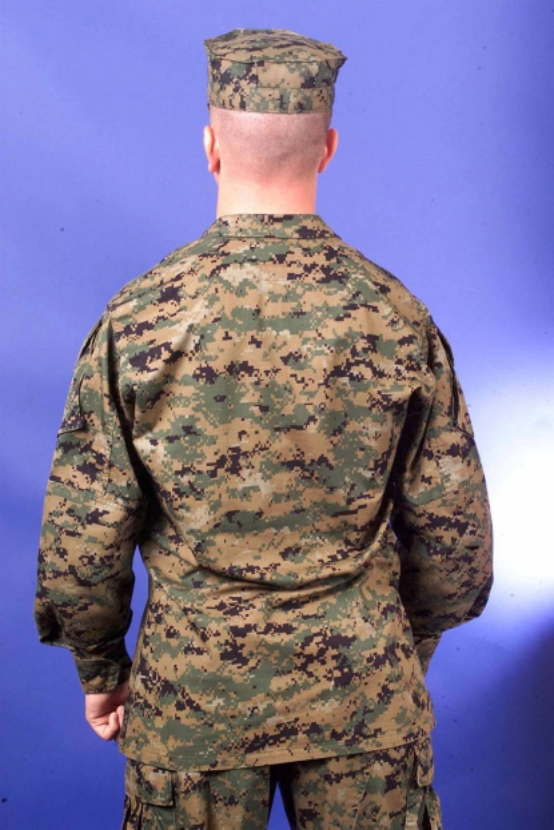
The rear of an MCCUU, being worn by a U.S. Marine in 2002

The MCCUU is intended for wear in the field or for working parties, but has become the typical working uniform for all deployed and most garrison U.S. Marines and U.S. Navy sailors. Initially the variety worn depended on the environment and season: Deployed Marines wore whichever color is more appropriate to the climate and terrain, Marines in garrison wore the woodland MCCUU in winter months, and the desert MCCUU in summer months. However, the Marine Corps announced on December 8, 2016, that the desert pattern would no longer be worn in garrison. Instead, the woodland MCCUU will be worn year-round, with the sleeves rolled up during the summer and down during the winter. Until recently, the sleeves of the blouse were normally worn rolled up while in garrison during summer months. However, the Uniform Board announced that as of October 24, 2011, this will no longer be allowed. This decision was later reversed when Marine Corps Commandant General James Amos announced on February 25, 2014, that the Marine Corps will return to its former standard of rolling up the sleeves while in garrison during summer months, effective March 9, 2014.

Unlike the previous BDU, the MCCUU was designed to be used with body armor, which previously restricted access to front pockets. To further distinguish the uniform, upon close examination, the Eagle, Globe, and Anchor can be found within the pattern. Its use as a combat uniform has led to some strict regulations for wear in garrison: unlike the U.S. Army's Army Combat Uniform (ACU), the MCCUU may not be worn off base, although it may be worn when commuting to and from duty in a privately owned vehicle. Dismounting for incidental stops en route off of a military installation is no longer permissible excepting legitimate emergencies only.

=== Blouse ===
- Two slanting chest pockets with velcro closure
- Two shoulder sleeve pockets with button closure
- Reinforced elbows
- Internal pockets for elbow pads
- Adjustable cuffs
- Eagle, Globe, and Anchor embroidered on the left chest pocket

=== Trousers ===
- Two front slash style pockets
- Two rear pockets with button closure
- Two thigh level bellows cargo pockets with elastic closure
- Button fly
- Reinforced knees and seat
- Partially elastic waistband
- Internal pockets for kneepads
- Seven belt loops

The trousers are worn bloused over the tops of the boots with the use of elastic bands (nicknamed "boot bands") or metal springs.

=== Headwear ===
- In garrison the 8 point cover is worn
- In the field, the boonie (floppy) cover can be worn, not authorized for garrison wear.
- The Marine Corps Lightweight Helmet (rare) and Enhanced Combat Helmet is worn in combat and training with a reversible MARPAT cover
- The Marine Corps Eagle, Globe, and Anchor is embroidered on both the boonie and utility covers.

=== T-shirt ===
An olive drab green t-shirt, or skivvy shirt, without a logo is worn underneath the blouse. Due to the intense heat in Iraq, moisture wicking t-shirts, such as those produced by Under Armour became very popular. However, due to concerns that the shirts would melt to the skin in the event of a fire or explosion, they are banned when a Marine is deployed to a combat zone. However, the Marine Corps has worked with Danskin to develop their own moisture wicking shirts under the "Elite Issue" line, ultimately creating and issuing the Flame Resistant Organizational Gear to troops likely to be exposed to combat.

=== Belt ===
The MCCUU is worn with a webbed rigger's belt earned through the Marine Corps Martial Arts Program. The belts are tan, grey, green, brown, or up to six degrees of black, depending on the Marine's proficiency. Uniform regulations still authorize a web belt for wear for Marines that have not qualified in MCMAP; however, the Commandant of the Marine Corps directed in 2008 that all Marines will qualify. This directive rendered the wear of the item on the MCCUU to new recruits in basic training or to those who have lost their MCMAP belt due to not being proficient in the MCMAP.

=== Boots ===
The Marine Corps now requires tan rough-out combat boots, either hot weather or temperate weather versions. Commercial versions of this boot are authorized without limitation other than they must be at least 8 inches in height and bear the Eagle, Globe, and Anchor on the outer heel of each boot. Stains and damage to the boot make them unserviceable for wear, as well as a heel with excessive wear.

When the MCCUU was first being fielded in 2002, the black leather boots that were worn with the woodland BDU were authorized to be worn with the woodland MCCUU in the absence of the tan suede ones, though now, only the latter are authorized.

=== Insignia ===
Rank insignia is pinned onto the collar:

- Marines from pay-grades E-2 to E-9 wear black insignia.
- Marine officers wear polished insignia in garrison, subdued (flat black and brown to replace silver and gold, respectively) or none in the field.

Most badges and breast insignia are authorized for wear on the utility uniform, shined or subdued as appropriate. Landing Support Marines also wear the Red Patch insignia.

== MARPAT patterns ==
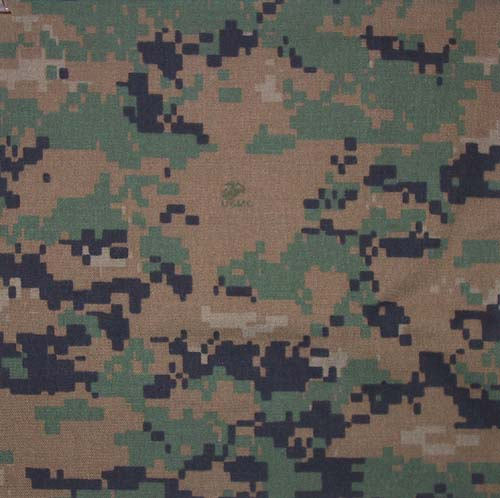
MARPAT woodland pattern

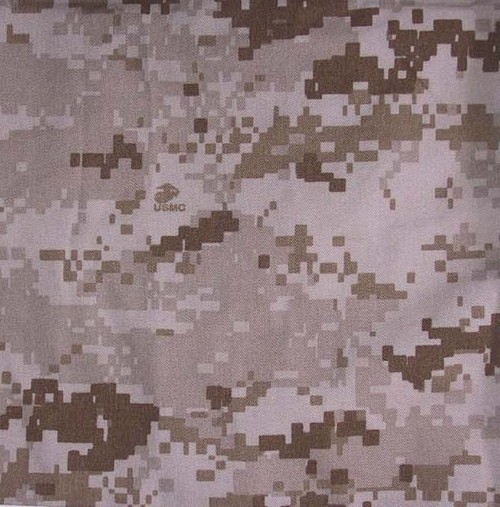
MARPAT desert pattern

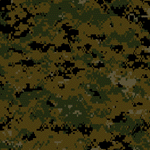
Prototype of woodland pattern from 2001

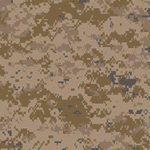
Prototype of desert pattern from 2001 featuring grey elements

== See also ==
- Uniforms of the United States Military
- Uniforms of the United States Marine Corps
- MARPAT
- Flame Resistant Organizational Gear
- Airman Battle Uniform
- Army Combat Uniform
- Battle Dress Uniform
- Navy Working Uniform
- Operational Camouflage Pattern
- Operational Dress Uniform
