= National Comprehensive Cancer Network =

Non-profit organization in the U.S.

NCCN
- Formation: January 31, 1995; 31 years ago
- Type: Non-profit
- Purpose: Cancer research and education
- Headquarters: Plymouth Meeting, Pennsylvania
- Board Chair: John W. Sweetenham
- Website: nccn.org

The National Comprehensive Cancer Network (NCCN) is an alliance of 34 cancer centers in the United States, most of which are designated by the National Cancer Institute (one of the U.S. National Institutes of Health) as comprehensive cancer centers. It is a non-profit organization with offices in Plymouth Meeting, Pennsylvania. John W. Sweetenham, MD, FRCP, FACP, FASCO, from UT Southwestern Simmons Comprehensive Cancer Center, is chairman of the NCCN Board of Directors. It publishes a peer-reviewed medical journal called Journal of the National Comprehensive Cancer Network.

== History ==
The NCCN was publicly announced in 1995.

The first edition of the Journal of the National Comprehensive Cancer Network was published in 2003.

== NCCN Member Institutions ==
Experts from the 34 NCCN Member Institutions are recognized for dealing with complex, aggressive, or rare cancers.

The 34 NCCN Member Institutions are:

- Abramson Cancer Center of the University of Pennsylvania
- Case Comprehensive Cancer Center/University Hospitals Seidman Cancer Center and Cleveland Clinic Taussig Cancer Institute
- City of Hope National Medical Center
- Dana-Farber/Brigham and Women's Cancer Center
- Duke Cancer Institute
- Fox Chase Cancer Center
- Fred & Pamela Buffett Cancer Center at the University of Nebraska Medical Center
- Fred Hutchinson Cancer Center
- Huntsman Cancer Institute at the University of Utah
- Indiana University Melvin and Bren Simon Comprehensive Cancer Center
- Johns Hopkins Kimmel Cancer Center
- Mass General Cancer Center
- Mayo Clinic Comprehensive Cancer Center
- Memorial Sloan Kettering Cancer Center
- Moffitt Cancer Center
- O'Neal Comprehensive Cancer Center at University of Alabama at Birmingham
- Robert H. Lurie Comprehensive Cancer Center
- Roswell Park Comprehensive Cancer Center
- Siteman Cancer Center at Barnes-Jewish Hospital and WashU Medicine
- St. Jude Children's Research Hospital/The University of Tennessee Health Science Center
- Stanford Cancer Institute
- The Ohio State University Comprehensive Cancer Center - James Cancer Hospital and Solove Research Institute
- The UChicago Medicine Comprehensive Cancer Center
- University of Texas MD Anderson Cancer Center
- UC Davis Comprehensive Cancer Center
- UC San Diego Moores Cancer Center
- UCLA Jonsson Comprehensive Cancer Center
- UCSF Helen Diller Family Comprehensive Cancer Center
- University of Colorado Cancer Center
- University of Michigan Rogel Cancer Center
- University of Wisconsin Carbone Cancer Center
- University of Texas Southwestern Medical Center
- Vanderbilt-Ingram Cancer Center
- Yale Cancer Center/Smilow Cancer Hospital

== See also ==
- American Cancer Society Cancer Action Network
- American Cancer Society Center
- Canadian Cancer Society
- National Cancer Institute
- Oncology
- Programme of Action for Cancer Therapy
