= Flame Resistant Organizational Gear =

United States Marine combat uniform

Flame Resistant Operational Gear (FROG) is clothing used by the United States Marine Corps to reduce the number of injuries resulting from fire and flash (especially burns), due to the increased use of improvised explosive devices in the wars in Afghanistan and Iraq.

== Features ==
The FROG system consists of a long-sleeve shirt, t-shirt, combat shirt, combat trousers, gloves, and a balaclava. The shirts and trousers are camouflaged in MARPAT, while the remainder are colored in either sand or olive drab.

- The balaclava has a hinged face guard that lets the wearer pull down the face guard and expose their face without taking off a helmet to remove the whole balaclava.
- The long-sleeve shirt has a mock neck, moisture-wicking, and antimicrobial properties.
- The t-shirt has most of the same properties as the long-sleeve shirt.
- The combat shirt closely resembles the Marine Corps Combat Utility Uniform, but the portion covered by the Marine's body armor (such as the Outer Tactical Vest or Modular Tactical Vest) is not as highly reinforced due to the protective qualities of the vest, and to prevent discomfort. There are pockets only on the upper sleeve.
- The combat trousers also closely resemble the utility uniform, but there is an additional calf-pocket to help distinguish it from non-FROG trousers.
- The gloves are designed to be highly durable.
- Fire-resistant versions of cold-weather clothing are produced and issued as FROG equipment, including:
  - silkweight undershirts and underdrawers (nicknamed "polypro"), designed by Polartec as a mock turtleneck meant to be worn next to skin
  - The Grid Fleece Midweight underwear includes a pullover and pants (in green and coyote brown).
  - The Inclement Weather Combat Shirt is used for protection from rain and snow, since the All Purpose Environmental Clothing System (APECS) is not fire-resistant.

Flight and vehicle crewman suits are also re-classified as FROG II uniforms.

The unit commander can dictate how much protection is needed by ordering one of two FROG levels, which alter how much protective clothing is necessary.

The Corps is acquiring a new cold-weather flame-resistant shirt, specifically for the bitter cold winters of Afghanistan, along with a new fire-resistant glove for increased insulation in cold-weather environments.

== History ==
The FROG program was developed in 2006, and the fielding of units began in 2007. In 2009, the shift of focus from Iraq to Afghanistan led to the development of cold-weather clothing. In May 2010, the Marine Corps Times featured an article addressing the base FROG's lack of durability, citing that regular laundering in Afghanistan leads to clothing failure within weeks, instead of the designed year. When exposed to water or sweat and improperly dried, the fabric would become brittle and seams would fail significantly with little stress. Marine officials have begun issuing additional suits as an interim response until the issue can be addressed.

== See also ==
- Uniforms of the United States Marine Corps
- Army Combat Shirt
- Fire Resistant Environmental Ensemble
