= University of Michigan Rogel Cancer Center =

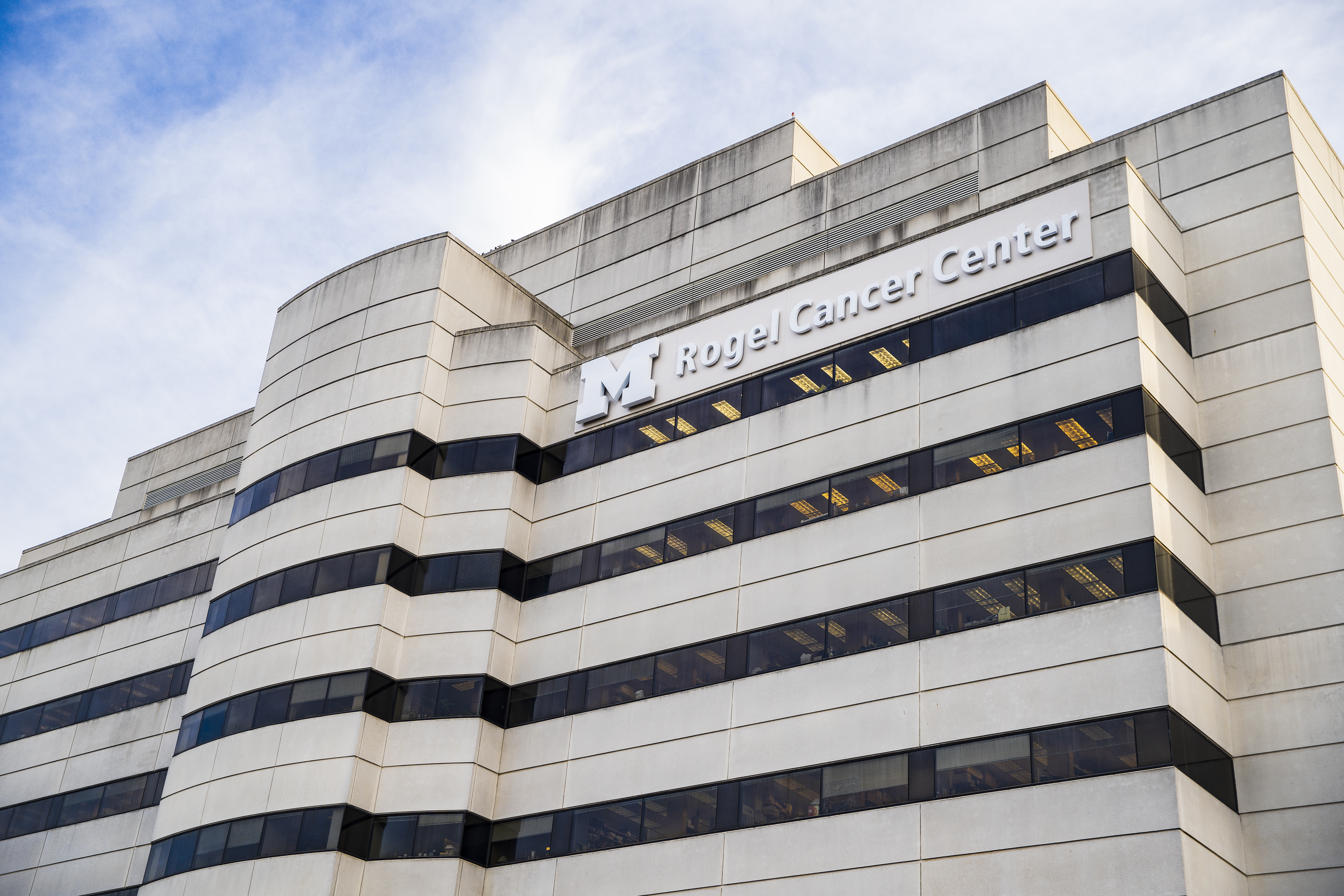
The Rogel Cancer Center building

The University of Michigan Rogel Cancer Center is a cancer research and treatment institution based in Ann Arbor, Michigan, United States. The Rogel Cancer Center is affiliated with the University of Michigan and Michigan Medicine.

== History ==
The Rogel Cancer Center was founded in 1986 at the University of Michigan. In 1988, it was designated as part of the National Cancer Institute cancer centers program. It received comprehensive cancer center status in 1991 and continues to be an NCI-designated comprehensive cancer center today.

From 1991 to 2018, it was known as the University of Michigan Comprehensive Cancer Center. The center was renamed the Rogel Cancer Center in 2018 in recognition of a $150 million commitment from Richard and Susan Rogel.

The Rogel Cancer Center is ranked among the top cancer programs by U.S. News & World Report. In addition to being an NCI-designated comprehensive cancer center, it is a founding member of the National Comprehensive Cancer Network

The center's founding director was Max Wicha, a medical oncologist and researcher who was part of the team to first discover cancer stem cells in a solid tumor. Wicha served as director for 27 years. He was succeeded by Theodore Lawrence in 2015 and by Eric Fearon in 2016. Fearon is a nationally recognized investigator in cancer genetics whose research has led to a greater understanding of the gene defects that cause colon and rectal cancer to develop and spread.

== Scientific programs ==
Research at the Rogel Cancer Center is divided into six basic, clinical and population science programs:

- Signaling and Tumor Microenvironment
- Cancer Genetics
- Cancer Hematopoiesis and Immunology
- Developmental Therapeutics
- Translational and Clinical Research
- Cancer Control and Population Sciences

== Accomplishments ==
Notable cancer research discoveries from the Rogel Cancer Center include:

- Identifying the TMPSS2:ERG gene fusion, which is seen in 50% of all prostate cancers
- Developing new potential treatments for graft-versus-host disease
- Creating new mouse models to facilitate research in cancer biology
- Identifying cancer stem cells in numerous solid tumors and elucidating how these small number of cells within a tumor are what fuels its growth and spread
- Assessing the long-term financial issues that cancer treatment causes for many patients
- Developing new ways of giving radiation therapy to improve the efficacy while reducing impact on normal tissue
