= High-dose chemotherapy and bone marrow transplant =

Former breast cancer treatment

High-dose chemotherapy and bone marrow transplant (HDC/BMT), also high-dose chemotherapy with autologous bone marrow transplant (HDC/ABMT or just ABMT), was an ineffective treatment regimen for metastatic breast cancer, and later high-risk breast cancer, that was considered promising during the 1980s and 1990s. With an overall idea that more is better, this process involved taking cells from the person's bone marrow to store in a lab, then to give such high doses of chemotherapy drugs that the remaining bone marrow was destroyed, and then to inject the cells taken earlier back into the body as replacement. It was ultimately determined to be no more effective than normal treatment, and to have significantly higher side effects, including treatment-related death.

From its birth in the 1980s to its denouncement in the late 1990s, HDC/BMT transformed clinical practice, activist-driven legislation on healthcare insurance coverage, public health policy and drove a two-decade long period of entrepreneurial oncology. It also gave rise to one of the most serious cases of research misconduct of the 20th century.

== History ==
The idea for high-dose chemotherapy (HDC) with autologous bone marrow transplant (ABMT) originated in the 1950s as a leukemia treatment, when E. Donnall Thomas had shown that bone marrow could be harvested from a person and transplanted into the same or another person. It was promoted as a treatment for advanced breast cancer starting in the 1980s.

The treatment of high-dose chemotherapy with autologous bone marrow transplant had serious, lasting, and sometimes deadly side effects for the patient, including cardiac toxicity, sepsis, pulmonary failure, and nephrotoxicity, among others. Chronic consequences of the treatment included development of leukemias and lymphomas and heightened vulnerability to infections soon after the transplant. Randomized clinical trials reported treatment-mortality rates from 0% to 7% for women who received the HDC/BMT treatment, versus no such deaths within the control groups that received the typical chemotherapy regimen.

In HDC, the bone marrow transplantation was used to maximise chemotherapeutic dosage. By harvesting and freezing bone marrow, then implanting the marrow after HDC, doctors were theoretically able to break through the frontier of toxicity, the so-called "red ceiling". Early proponents of the technique were George Canellos and Emil Frei of the Dana–Farber Cancer Institute, and William Peters, whom Frei had recruited to the institute in 1982. Howard Skipper and Frank Schabel demonstrated efficacy in mouse models for megadose therapy in 1983.

Frei and Peters developed the Solid Tumor Autologous Marrow Program (STAMP) regimen. Researchers in the National Cancer Institute (NCI) did not believe that the treatment would be effective and were wary of the consequences of this treatment. For example, George Canellos, one of the original members of the NCI, had noticed that a long-term side effect of megadose chemotherapy regimens was myelodysplasia, a condition that tended to progress to leukemia. During the early stages of the STAMP clinical trial, the first patients were those who were hopeless cases—women with advanced, metastatic breast cancer that had already received, and did not respond to, existing treatments. However, about halfway through the trial, a previously untreated woman with metastatic breast cancer enrolled in the STAMP program, and many of Peters's colleagues began to take notice. The results of her treatment were unprecedented—her tumor and metastatic deposits had shrunk significantly. From then until the end of this preliminary clinical trial, Peters had transplanted and treated more cases and also obtained significant remissions similar to that of this woman's. They then believed that STAMP produced more durable remissions than those by conventional chemotherapy, and so Peters left to set up a randomized clinical trial at Duke University.

By December 1984, 32 women had completed the Phase I study of the regimen, designed to investigate safety. The researchers proceeded with Phase II trials, which showed very promising results. However, only women who were healthier and responded better to conventional chemotherapy were eligible for the Phase II studies. The problem with Phase II studies was explained thus:

If you have a hundred patients and you give them a treatment applicable to all 100, and two are alive after 10 years, that is a 2% absolute survival rate. If you have 100 patients and you have a treatment applicable to 20 of the 100, and 20% of those 20 are alive after 10 years, that's only a 4% absolute survival rate, not a 20% survival rate.

— Gabriel N. Hortobagyi, M.D., Journal of the National Cancer Institute, July 5, 1995

This selection bias makes the treatment look better, because candidates who would have fared better under any condition were selected. To belabour the point further Hortobagyi, using data from the University of Texas M. D. Anderson Cancer Center in Houston, reported in May 1995 that those eligible for high-dose chemotherapy survived 65% longer on conventional chemotherapy than those who would not have been eligible for the protocol. Subsequent research on doxorubicin-containing protocols for the treatment of metastatic breast cancer, found that median progression-free survival (PFS) was 16 and 8 months and median overall survival (OS) was 30 and 17 months, respectively for women who met eligibility criteria versus those who did not, when all received the conventional treatment.

Stage III randomised controlled trials were needed to confirm the benefit of HDC/BMT. In 1985, William Peters left the National Cancer Institute to set up the trial at Duke University in North Carolina. He persuaded the Cancer and Leukemia Group B (CALGB) to sponsor a multicenter, randomised controlled trial.

Clinical use of this treatment was driven by women with breast cancer and advocacy groups, such as ACT UP; they believed that the FDA treatment approval process was too slow. Health Net's denial of Nelene Fox's transplant—a case involving insurance coverage of HDC/ABMT—ignited a public reaction and prompted change in access to treatment. Unlike new drugs, which are evaluated and approved by the Food and Drug Administration (FDA), medical procedures are not officially regulated by any agency nor does there exist any statutory requirement to serve a similar function. Around 30,000 women received the HDC/ABMT procedure in the 1989–2002 period; the medical profession was divided in its commitment to clinical trials and sanctioned the procedure as better than existing treatment before there was proof from the scientific community—of the women who received the procedure, only about 1000 of them were enrolled in randomized clinical trials in the United States. In contrast, repeated assessments concluded that existing data did not support claims of the effectiveness of HDC/ABMT, leading to the high-priority phase 3 clinical trials in 1990–1991, which were supported by the effort of the National Cancer Institute (NCI), skeptical scientists, health insurance companies, and cancer groups.

The results of clinical trials ended up showing that HDC/BMT for breast cancer was not an effective treatment and did not increase survival rates compared to existing treatment. These conclusions were drawn from a combination of studies, including that of Peters and a large study executed by the Netherlands Cancer Institute, both of which drew the conclusion that HDC/BMT was not superior to standard breast cancer treatment. Another study, done by researcher Werner Bezwoda, reached the conclusion that the treatment was effective, but his study was later discredited due to scientific misconduct, including the falsification of data. The treatment was discontinued for breast cancer, although it is still used to combat other types of cancers, like leukemias and lymphomas.

== Funding mechanisms and litigation ==
With the rise in popularity of this treatment, more and more women with breast cancer wanted it to be available to the public—not just offered in clinical trials. Inspired by HIV/AIDS activism, several cancer advocacy groups began to lobby for the general availability of HDC/BMT. This drew potential patients away from clinical trials, such as that of Peters. As a result, by the late 1980s, most hospitals and private clinics had transplant wards to provide HDC/BMT to those women who sought it.

Most women could not afford to pay for the treatment themselves, due to high cost of US $50,000 to $400,000 per patient. As long as health maintenance organizations (HMOs) and other insurers regarded the regime as experimental or investigational, there was no contractual obligation to cover it. While, in the mid-1980s, fewer than 100 bone marrow transplants a year were performed on breast cancer patients, the uptake of HDC/BMT increased six-fold between January 1, 1989 and June 30, 1995. Between those dates 19,291 autotransplants were reported to the Autologous Blood and Marrow Transplant Registry; 5,886 were for breast cancer. After 1992, breast cancer was the most common indication for autotransplant. Only 11% of women with stage 2/3 disease, and less than one percent of those with stage 4 disease, participated in randomized trials. The International Bone Marrow Transplant Registry estimated that at least 4,000 women were treated with HDC/BMT from 1989 through 1993, with fewer than 10% doing so within trials. Based on the unsubstantiated belief in the success of HDC/BMT, women refused to be randomised to conventional treatment conditions, and doctors were not reimbursed for additional time spent administering protocols. Simultaneously, the treatment was highly profitable for hospitals who, by 1995, were billing the procedure at $80,000 to $100,000 (equivalent to $210,000 in 2025), at a cost to the hospital of less than $60,000. Hospitals, like Beth Israel in Boston, devoted entire floors to transplant units.

In 1993, a landmark court case, Fox v. Health Net. changed the existing policy of HMOs toward paying for the treatment. A public-school teacher named Nelene Hiepler Fox (1953–1993) was diagnosed with breast cancer in 1991. She requested her HMO to pay for High-Dose Chemotherapy and Bone Marrow Transplant (HDC/BMT) to treat her cancer. Her health maintenance organization, Health Net, declined her request, stating this therapy was an unproven, experimental therapy. Fox's brother, Mark Hiepler, took her HMO, Health Net, to court to force them to pay for HDC/BMT, which they had refused to do. Despite raising $220,000 herself and receiving the treatment regime, Fox died on April 22, 1993. Mark Hiepler sought damages from Health Net for delaying his sister's treatment. On December 28, Fox's family was awarded $89 million by a Californian jury, including $12.1 million for bad faith and reckless infliction of emotional distress, and $77 million in punitive damages. Jim Fox and the estate of Nelene Fox v. Health Net is considered a watershed case in that most health insurers subsequently began approving HDC/BMT for advanced breast cancer.

Between 1988 and 2002, 86 cases were filed to force HMOs to pay for transplants, of which 47 resulted in HMOs being required to pay for the transplants. The legislatures of Massachusetts, New Hampshire, Virginia, and Minnesota mandated insurance coverage for all high-dose chemotherapy with ABMT or peripheral blood stem cell (PBSCT) transplant for women with breast cancer.

The media, both newspapers and television, played an important role in promoting HDC/ABMT to people, especially through their portrayals of women with breast cancer, which ignited public protests and prompted legislative change that mandated insurance coverage of HDC/ABMT. For example, the Boston Globe published a story regarding Charlotte Turner, a woman with breast cancer whose HMO would not pay for her treatment, which spurred the lobbying of the Massachusetts state legislature. In response to the lobbying and public pressure generated by the story, the Massachusetts state legislature passed legislation requiring HMOs to cover the HDC/BMT treatment in late 1993. Journalists portrayed HDC/ABMT as a miracle treatment, with patients playing the victims, doctors the saviors, and breast cancer and health insurers the villains. Most articles made three major points:

1. HDC was logical because if a little chemotherapy could treat early cases, then more chemotherapy was clearly needed for more advanced cases.
2. HDC/ABMT was the only hope for someone an advanced breast cancer
3. The main barrier between someone and their potential cure was money, which health insurance companies did not want to spend to cover the treatment.

This led to many people having the wrong impression of HDC/ABMT, which in reality, was a treatment that was not supported by clinical trials. As a result, patients pushed for the treatment to be administered more widely and to be covered by insurance companies.

The reluctance of insurance organizations to pay for the HDC/BMT treatment stemmed from the difference in patients'/doctors' and researchers' opinions of the treatment. Academic researchers wanted to wait for the results of the clinical trials, while breast cancer oncologists and bone marrow transplanters supported the procedure. At the time, the clinical trials on the effectiveness and benefits of this treatment diverged greatly: the trials by Peters in the U.S. and other large research hospitals in Europe reached the conclusion that the treatment had at most modest results—even negative results—regarding the superiority of this high-dose chemotherapy with autologous bone marrow transplant. However, a study by the researcher Werner Bezwoda showed promising benefits of this treatment—although his study was later confirmed to have falsified data. In addition, there was already a lot of positive publicity surrounding the treatment, and 79% of oncologists believed that HDC/BMT was an appropriate treatment for women with locally advanced breast cancer. In fact, the number of women who received this treatment increased by about 8000 between 1990 and 1999. This disparity was one of the reasons HMOs held back from covering high-dose chemotherapy with autologous bone marrow transplant; if a treatment is expensive and not clinically proven to be beneficial, health organizations can decline to pay for the treatment, regardless of patient protests.

General strategies for plaintiffs included arguing that HDC/BMT was the patient's only chance for survival, patient choice from a physician's recommendation, and portraying the HMO in unfavorable terms to the jury. General strategies for the defendant, or insurer, included stating that the coverage plans did not believe HDC/BMT was in the patient's best interests because of the high mortality rates and reduced quality of life; stating that the treatment had not been clinically proven to be beneficial and more effective than existing treatments—the results of the clinical trials had not yet been reported.

== Randomised controlled trials ==
In May 1992, researchers from the University of the Witwatersrand (Wits) in South Africa presented early results of a randomised control trial (RCT) at the annual meeting of the American Society of Clinical Oncology (ASCO) in San Diego. The lead investigator was Werner Bezwoda, professor of haematology and oncology at Wits. This was the first scientific evidence of clinical benefit to emerge.

Bezwoda published the first randomised controlled trial of high-dose versus conventional-dose chemotherapy as first-line treatment for metastatic breast cancer in October 1995. Ninety patients were randomised to compare two cycles of high-dose cyclophosphamide, mitoxantrone, and etoposide (HD-CNV) versus six to eight cycles of conventional-dose cyclophosphamide, mitoxantrone, and vincristine (CNV). The overall response rate for HD-CNV was 95%, with 23 of 45 patients achieving complete response (remission).

The apparent success of the 1995 study drew immediate notice for its authors; as of February 2001, the 1995 article had been cited 354 times. Patients were also enthused; in the Autologous Blood and Marrow Transplant Registry (ABMTR) database, the number of patients treated with high-dose therapy increased rapidly after the Bezwoda study was published. Many centers in the United States moved to offer HDC/BMT on the basis of Bezwoda's work. By 1999/2000 perhaps as many as 35,000 women had been treated with the regime. However, Bezwoda's research work was seriously flawed, and an audit concluded that the results were essentially fabricated.

=== American Society of Clinical Oncology (ASCO) Annual Meeting 1999 ===
During May 15–18, 1999, the American Society of Clinical Oncology (ASCO) held its 35th annual meeting in Atlanta. At the plenary session, held on May 17, four studies on HDC/BMT were presented to some 20,000 attendees.

The Philadelphia Intergroup Study (PBT-1) was the largest randomized trial of HDC versus conventional dose chemotherapy in responding metastatic breast cancer. The study showed no difference in overall survival and no substantial toxicity difference between the groups.

This largest randomized trial of bone marrow transplant in metastatic breast cancer demonstrates no improvement in overall survival with transplant, no improvement in time to progression or progression-free survival with transplant, no substantial difference in lethal toxicity. Non-lethal serious toxicities were greater in the transplant arm, particularly hematologic, infection, nausea and diarrhea. Obviously, from the survival curves, these results will not change with more follow-up in this study.

— Edward A. Stadtmauer, ASCO Annual Meeting, May 17, 1999

William Peters presented preliminary results from his CALGB study (fully described as CALGB 9082/SWOG 9114/NCIC MA-13). Peters found "no significant difference in either event-free or overall survival between the randomized groups. There were 31 deaths related to therapy in the high-dose arm; a rate of 7.4%." The study design called for an additional three years of follow-up before final conclusions could be drawn.

The Scandinavian Breast Cancer Study Group 9401 randomised 525 high risk breast cancer patients between March 1, 1994 to March 4, 1998. Principal investigator Jonas Bergh reported no overall survival benefit to high-dose therapy versus a tailored regimen, after a median follow-up time of 27 months.

Finally, Werner Bezwoda presented his randomised, controlled clinical trial of 154 patients.

The majority of the patients were black, and all were under age 55. The study differed from the others in that no induction therapy was used; patients were immediately randomized to either high-dose or standard therapy. After five years, 21 of 75 patients on the high-dose arm had relapsed, compared to 55 of 79 patients on the standard dose arm. Relapse-free survival and overall survival was significantly better in the high-dose arm. High-dose chemotherapy using the CMVP combination was found to be able to be given safely to younger patients with high-risk breast cancer. The high-dose chemotherapy resulted in a significantly low relapse rate, and high-dose chemotherapy was associated with significantly longer disease-free and overall survival in this patient population.

— Werner R. Bezwoda, ASCO Annual Meeting, May 17, 1999

=== Research misconduct ===
At the time of the 1999 ASCO meeting, Bezwoda's 1995 and 1999 studies were the only trials supporting the use of HDC/BMT. While still at the meeting, Gabriel Hortobagyi had called for the replication of the South African study. Raymond Weiss of Georgetown University, who had also seen the presentation, and Roy Beberidge helped organize an audit of the South African's research.

The audit team found Bezwoda had patient records for only 62 patients out of 154. Many records had unsigned, handwritten entries and there was no evidence that Bezwoda had randomly assigned patients. There were no records showing that any patients had received the standard treatment. The audit team informed the ethics committee at Wits of probable ethical problems with Bezwoda's research on January 28, 2000.

On January 31, 2000 the head of the Department of Medicine gave the ethics committee chairman a signed statement, dated January 30, from Bezwoda, admitting to "a serious breach of scientific honesty and integrity in a presentation made at the American Society for Clinical Oncology (ASCO) in May 1999". A disciplinary hearing was set for March 10. Max Price, dean of the Faculty of Health Sciences, was appointed acting head of haematology and oncology. Bezwoda was dismissed by the university on March 11.

Peter Cleaton-Jones, chair of the University’s Institutional Review Board, responded to the findings in the March 18, 2000 issue of The Lancet. He made clear that studies had to be approved by the Committee for Research on Human Subjects (Medical) at Wits, and could not be done unless such approval was obtained. The ethics committee at Wits had no record of the Bezwoda clinical trial. Lancet editor Richard Horton questioned whether Bezwoda could have acted alone to fabricate the study without the knowledge of his colleagues. Weiss and his team concluded:

The Bezwoda study should not be used as the basis for further trials to test the efficacy of the cyclophosphamide, mitoxantrone, etoposide regimen for high-dose chemotherapy in women with high-risk primary breast cancer.

— Weiss et al., The Lancet, March 18, 2000

George Canellos, editor-in-chief of the Journal of Clinical Oncology raised further concerns about Bezwoda's earlier research. The 1995 paper was audited in 2001, along with reviews of other published studies to determine whether they had been subject to the required institutional oversight.

The investigators could only find 61 of 90 patients. Only 27 had enough recorded information to evaluate eligibility for the trial by the published criteria. Of these 27, 18 did not meet one or more eligibility criteria. Only 25 patients appeared to have been treated with their assigned therapy around the time of their enrolment, and only three of these 25 did not receive HDC (i.e. could have been in a control group). Treatment details bore little resemblance to the published data. Additionally, nine other Bezwoda trials were not reviewed or approved by the appropriate institutional committee and contained at least one major untruth.

The Journal of Clinical Oncology retracted the 1995 paper on April 26, 2001, concluding: "the trial was not conducted in a scientifically acceptable manner. The protocol was apparently written 9 years after the study was started and only after another study by the same investigator was to be audited. No patient signed a consent form, and there is little evidence of true randomisation." ASCO President Lawrence H. Einhorn called the fraud "a stunning betrayal of public trust".

== Status in breast cancer ==
Utilization of HDC/ABMT for breast cancer decreased sharply after the negative reports revealed at the ASCO meeting in 1999. In addition, a mixture of wins and losses from litigation lawsuits over health insurance corporations' coverage of the treatment influenced the decline of the treatment, because technology assessments exhibited in court had concluded that the data did not support claims that HDC/ABMT was better than conventional therapy. Due to the decreased quality of life during and following HDC/BMT compared to that of conventional breast cancer treatment as well as the minimal extension of life, many physicians and the majority of people believe that the treatment is ineffective and too toxic. In addition, the finding that the Bezwoda study was false further drove the point that the treatment was not of significant benefit compared to standard treatment, because it was the only study that suggested a degree of recurrence-free survival benefit from HDC/BMT. The other randomized trials performed in the Netherlands and the United States, for example, all supported the opposite point: that this treatment is not a significant improvement over then-current conventional breast cancer treatment. High-dose therapy is also associated with an increase in second malignancies, including myelodysplastic syndromes and leukemias. When reflecting on the story of HDC/ABMT, especially on the widespread treatment and the lack of scientific data, many researchers and medical professionals stated that HDC/ABMT should have never been made accessible to the public without sound scientific data and conclusions; they view it as a period of shame for cancer medicine.

A 2011 overview of six randomized trials concluded:

Overall survival of patients with metastatic breast cancer in the six randomized trials was not significantly improved by high-dose chemotherapy; any benefit from high doses was small. No identifiable subset of patients seems to benefit from high-dose chemotherapy.

— Berry et al., Journal of Clinical Oncology, August 20, 2011

While HDC/ABMT has been discontinued, a rising therapy for cancer that is similar to HDC/BMT is CAR-T cell therapy, which is a type of immunotherapy. CAR T therapy collects the patient's own immune cells to treat their cancer, which is a similar idea to that behind HDC/BMT. Currently, there exist FDA-approved CAR T-cell therapies for children with acute lymphoblastic leukemia and adults with advanced lymphomas, but clinical trials are still in development as to whether CAR T-cell therapy can be effective against solid tumor cancers, like breast cancer. In a similar way to HDC/BMT, the treatment was first introduced for people for whom all other treatments have stopped working. The first women to participate in Peters's clinical trial were also those who had advanced breast cancer and for whom other treatments had stopped working.

== High-dose chemotherapy and bone marrow transplant for other cancers ==
While the high-dose chemotherapy and bone marrow transplant treatment is known for its impact on breast cancer, the treatment is presently used to treat other types of cancer, including testicular cancer, neuroblastoma, multiple myeloma, and various types of leukemias and lymphomas, like Hodgkin and non-Hodgkin Lymphoma.

There are two types of stem cell (bone marrow) transplants: autologous stem cell transplant, where the person's own stem cells are collected, frozen, and stored before the chemotherapy regimen and transfused back into their body by IV after chemotherapy, and allogeneic stem cell transplant, where the stem cells come from a donor that matches the person's HLA type to prevent the risk of graft-versus-host disease.

Autologous stem cell transplants are used more often to treat lymphoma, but this may not be an option if the person's lymphoma has metastasized to their bone marrow or blood. Allogeneic stem cell transplants have side effects that can make it hard for the patient to tolerate the treatment. In addition, since the bone marrow produces cells that are needed by the immune system to fight off infection, people who undergo the treatment are advised to take precautions regarding sanitation and are often placed in private hospital rooms with special air filters to reduce possibility of infection. Soon after treatment, patients have low red and white blood cell counts, and are thus usually placed on antibiotics to keep them from getting infections. Side effects of the treatment include heart, lung, stomach, kidney, or liver problems, among others.
