= Eric Winer =

(born 1956), American oncologist and researcher re breast cancer

Eric P. Winer
- Born: 1956 (age 69–70)
- Education: Yale University, B.A. (1978); Yale University Medical School, M.D. (1983)
- Known for: Breast Cancer; Oncology

Eric P. Winer (born 1956) is an American medical oncologist and clinical researcher specializing in breast cancer. As of February 1, 2022, he is director of Yale Cancer Center and president and physician-in-chief of the Smilow Cancer Hospital of Yale New Haven Health System. He also is Deputy Dean for Cancer Research at Yale School of Medicine. From 1997 to 2021, he was the Chief of the Breast Oncology Program at Dana–Farber Cancer Institute in Boston, Massachusetts. Beginning in 2013, he held a range of institutional roles at Dana-Farber, including Chief of Clinical Development, the Thompson Chair in Breast Cancer Research and Director of the Dana-Farber/Harvard SPORE in Breast Cancer. He also served as a Professor of Medicine at Harvard Medical School. He was president of the American Society of Clinical Oncology (ASCO) 2022-2023 and became Chair of the Board in mid-June 2023. His career has been focused on breast cancer treatment and research.

== Education and training ==
Winer received his undergraduate degree in History and Russian/East European Studies from Yale University in 1978 and graduated from the Yale School of Medicine in 1983. He completed residency training in internal medicine at Yale-New Haven Hospital, where he served as chief medical resident.

From 1987 to 1989, Winer held a fellowship in hematology-oncology at Duke University Medical Center. From 1989 to 1997 he was on the faculty at Duke University Medical Center and served as co-director of the Duke University Medical Center Multidisciplinary Breast Program. He moved to Dana–Farber Cancer Institute after 10 years at Duke.

== Career ==
Winer joined Brigham and Women's Hospital and Dana–Farber Cancer Institute in 1997 and was appointed director of the Breast Oncology Center and Associate Professor of Medicine at Harvard Medical School. He directed the breast cancer program at Dana–Farber Cancer Institute, Brigham and Women's Hospital, and Dana-Farber/Harvard Cancer Center for twenty four years.

Winer is former president of the American Society of Clinical Oncology (ASCO) a member of the ASCO Board, as well as a member of the Scientific Advisory Board of the Breast Cancer Research Foundation. For over a decade, he served as chief scientific advisor and chair of the Scientific Advisory Board for Susan G. Komen for the Cure. In recognition of his mentoring impact, he was the recipient of the William Silen Lifetime Achievement in Mentoring Award from Harvard Medical School in 2020. He has also received numerous awards for his breast cancer research, most notably the William L. McGuire Memorial Lecture Award in 2016 at the San Antonio Breast Cancer Symposium, the Gianni Bonadonna Breast Cancer Award at ASCO in 2017, the Susan G. Komen Brinker Award for Clinical Research in 2018, and the Jill Rose award from the Breast Cancer Research Foundation in 2019.

== Research ==
Winer has conducted numerous clinical trials during his career. For over a decade, he was the co-chair of the CALGB/Alliance Breast Cancer Committee. He served as the principal investigator of the Dana-Farber/Harvard Cancer Center NCI SPORE (National Cancer Institute Specialized Program of Research Excellence) in breast cancer. At Yale, his research group focuses on improving care through the development of new treatment approaches. He also recognizes the importance of de-escalating therapy in patients who can do just as well with less treatment.. His research is funded by the National Cancer Institute and an Advanced Research Projects Agency for health (ARPA-H) grant.

=== Articles ===
Winer has authored over 400 publications. Here is a selection of Winer's recently published articles:

- Tarantino P, Lee D, Foldi J, Soulos PR, et al. Outcomes with trastuzumab deruxtecan by biomarker status, line of treatment and prior receipt of sacituzumab govitecan in a large real-world database of patients with metastatic breast cancer. ESMO Open. 2025;10(7):105330.
- Ligibel JA, Ballman KV, McCall L, et al. Impact of a Weight Loss Intervention on 1-Year Weight Change in Women With Stage II/III Breast Cancer: Secondary Analysis of the Breast Cancer Weight Loss (BWEL) Trial. JAMA Oncol. 2025 Aug 21.
- Parsons HA, Messer C, Santos K, et al. Detection of heterogeneous resistance mechanisms to tyrosine kinase inhibitors from cell-free DNA. Cell Genom. 2025 Dec 10;5
- Mayer EL, Hlauschek D, Gnant M, et al. Palbociclib with adjuvant endocrine therapy in early breast cancer: 5-year follow-up analysis of the global multicenter, open-label, randomized phase III PALLAS trial (ABCSG-42/AFT-05/PrE0109/BIG-14-13). Ann Oncol. 2025 Oct 17.
- Cortes J, Lipatov O, Im SA, et al. Association of potential biomarkers with clinical outcomes in metastatic triple-negative breast cancer treated with pembrolizumab or chemotherapy. NPJ Breast Cancer. 2025 Oct 2.

== Awards ==
- Fellow of the American Society of Clinical Oncology, 2008
- A. Clifford Barger Excellence in Mentoring Award, Harvard Medical School, 2009
- Advancing the Careers of Women Faculty Award, Dana–Farber Cancer Institute, 2013
- The William L. McGuire Memorial Lectureship, San Antonio Breast Cancer Symposium, 2016
- Gianni Bonadonna Breast Cancer Award and Lecture, American Society of Clinical Oncology, 2017
- Jill Rose Award for Scientific Excellence, Breast Cancer Research Foundation, 2019
- William Silen Lifetime Achievement in Mentoring Award, Harvard Medical School, 2020
