= Paul Raeburn =

American author and science expositor (1950–2024)

- Born: November 26, 1950 (age 75)
- Died: April 18, 2024
- Spouse: Elizabeth DeVita
- Children: 2
- Relatives: Vincent T. DeVita (father-in-law); Ted DeVita (brother-in-law)

Paul Raeburn (November 26, 1950 – April 18, 2024) was an American author and science expositor, known for his book Do Fathers Matter? (2014) concerning the paternal influence on language acquisition and adolescent sexuality, among other topics.

Raeburn was the 2012 American Chemical Society (ACS) Grady-Stack Award Winner for Interpreting Chemistry for the Public. He was the science editor and a senior writer at Business Week, and the science editor and chief science correspondent of The Associated Press. He wrote for The New York Times Sunday Magazine, Scientific American, Psychology Today, The Washington Post, Discover, Popular Science, Child, Self, Technology Review and other newspapers and magazines.

Raeburn was a past president of the National Association of Science Writers and a recipient of its Science in Society Journalism Award.

A native of Detroit, Raeburn lived and worked in New York City with his wife, writer Elizabeth DeVita and their sons Henry and Luke.

== Works ==
His book Do Fathers Matter? was published June 3, 2014 by Scientific American/Farrar, Straus and Giroux. His book Acquainted with the Night is a memoir that tells of raising children with depression and bipolar disorder. In 2016, Raeburn and coauthor Kevin Zollman published The Game Theorist's Guide to Parenting. His previous books include Mars, published by the National Geographic Society in 1998, and The Last Harvest, published by Simon & Schuster in 1995.

== See also ==
- Elizabeth DeVita-Raeburn
