= Theodore Lawrence =

American radiation oncologist

- Born: Queens, New York, US

Academic background
- Education: PhD, cell biology, 1979, Rockefeller University; MD, 1980, Cornell University
- Thesis: The transmission of hormonal stimulation by cell-to-cell communication. (1979)

Academic work
- Institutions: University of Michigan Rogel Cancer Center

Theodore Steven Lawrence is an American radiation oncologist. In 2015, Lawrence was appointed the director of the University of Michigan Rogel Cancer Center.

== Early life and education ==
Lawrence was born in Queens, New York but raised in Port Washington, New York on Long Island. After graduating from Paul D. Schreiber Senior High School Lawrence enrolled at Rockefeller University for his PhD and Cornell University for his medical degree. With his medical degree, Lawrence then completed his residency in internal medicine at Stanford University and National Cancer Institute.

== Career ==
Upon completing his residency, Lawrence joined the faculty at the University of Michigan in 1987. During his early tenure at the institution, he developed combined treatments of intensified chemotherapy and radiation for patients with pancreatic cancer. He was soon promoted to the rank of associate professor of radiation oncology and interim chair of the Department of Radiation Oncology. In 2007, Larence was recognized for his scientific achievements with an election to the National Academy of Medicine. A few years later, he was the recipient of the 2009 Gold Medal from the American Society for Radiation Oncology. In 2015, Lawrence was appointed the director of the University of Michigan Rogel Cancer Center.
