= George Canellos =

American oncologist and cancer researcher

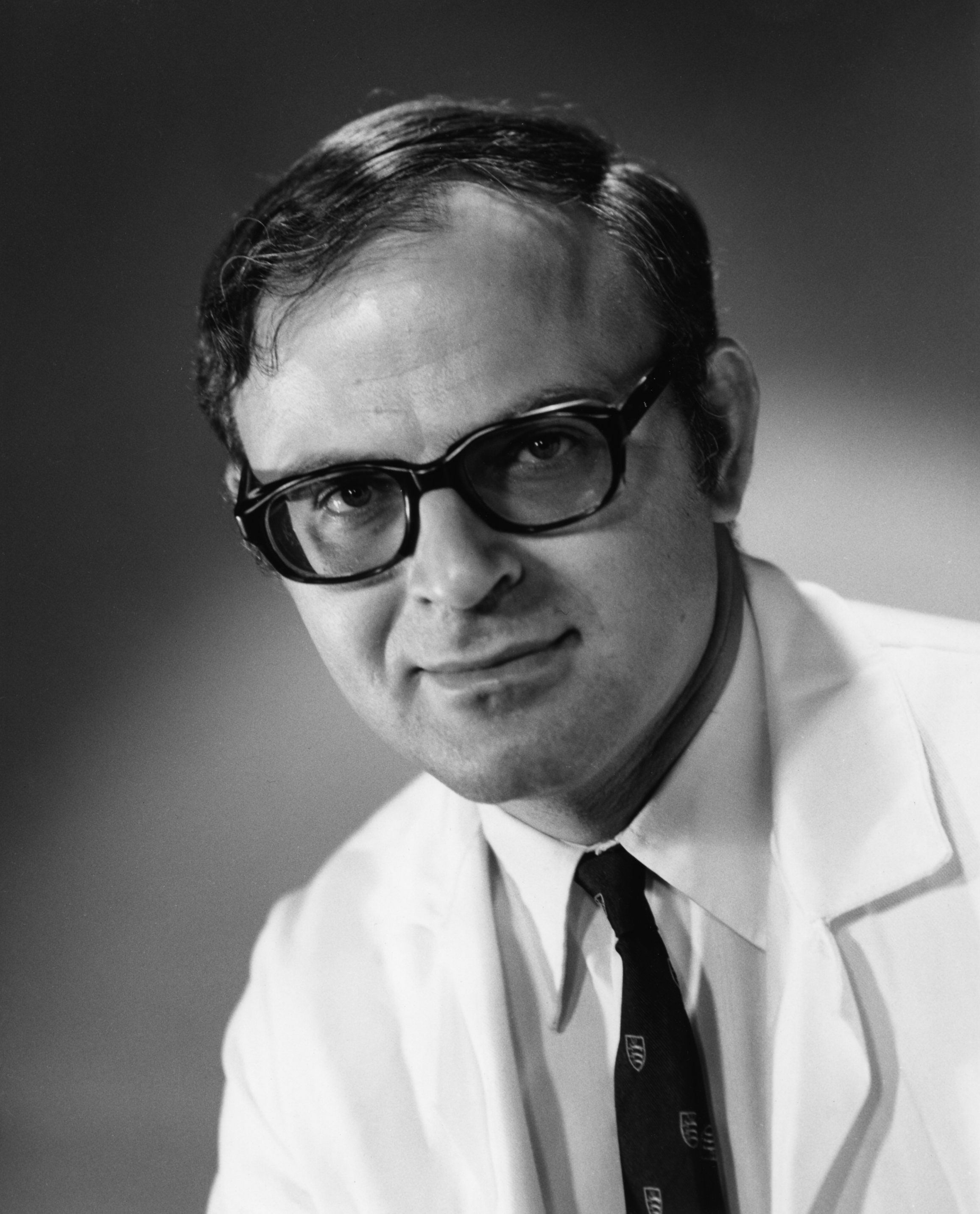
George P. Canellos (1975)

George Peter Canellos is an American oncologist and cancer researcher. His research career spans many decades, as well as several areas of therapeutic agents for the treatment of malignant diseases. He is perhaps most known for his work with Vincent T. DeVita in which he developed the combination chemotherapy CMF, which was one of the first combination therapies for breast cancer. The two also collaborated to create the MOPP regimen for Hodgkin's lymphoma.

As former chair of the Lymphoma Committee of the Cancer and Leukemia Group B (CALGB), a national American cooperative trials group, Canellos initiated many practice-changing clinical trials of cancer therapies. He was also the Editor-in-Chief of the Journal of Clinical Oncology from 1988 to 2001. He is currently one of the senior clinicians at the Dana–Farber Cancer Institute and the Brigham and Women's Hospital as well as the William Rosenberg Professor of Medicine at Harvard Medical School.

He graduated from Harvard College and Columbia University College of Physicians and Surgeons.
