= Harborside Press =

American medical publisher

Harborside Press is a medical publisher located in Huntington, New York. They publish JNCCN--Journal of the National Comprehensive Cancer Network, The ASCO Post, and the Journal of the Advanced Practitioner in Oncology.
