= Fire Resistant Environmental Ensemble =

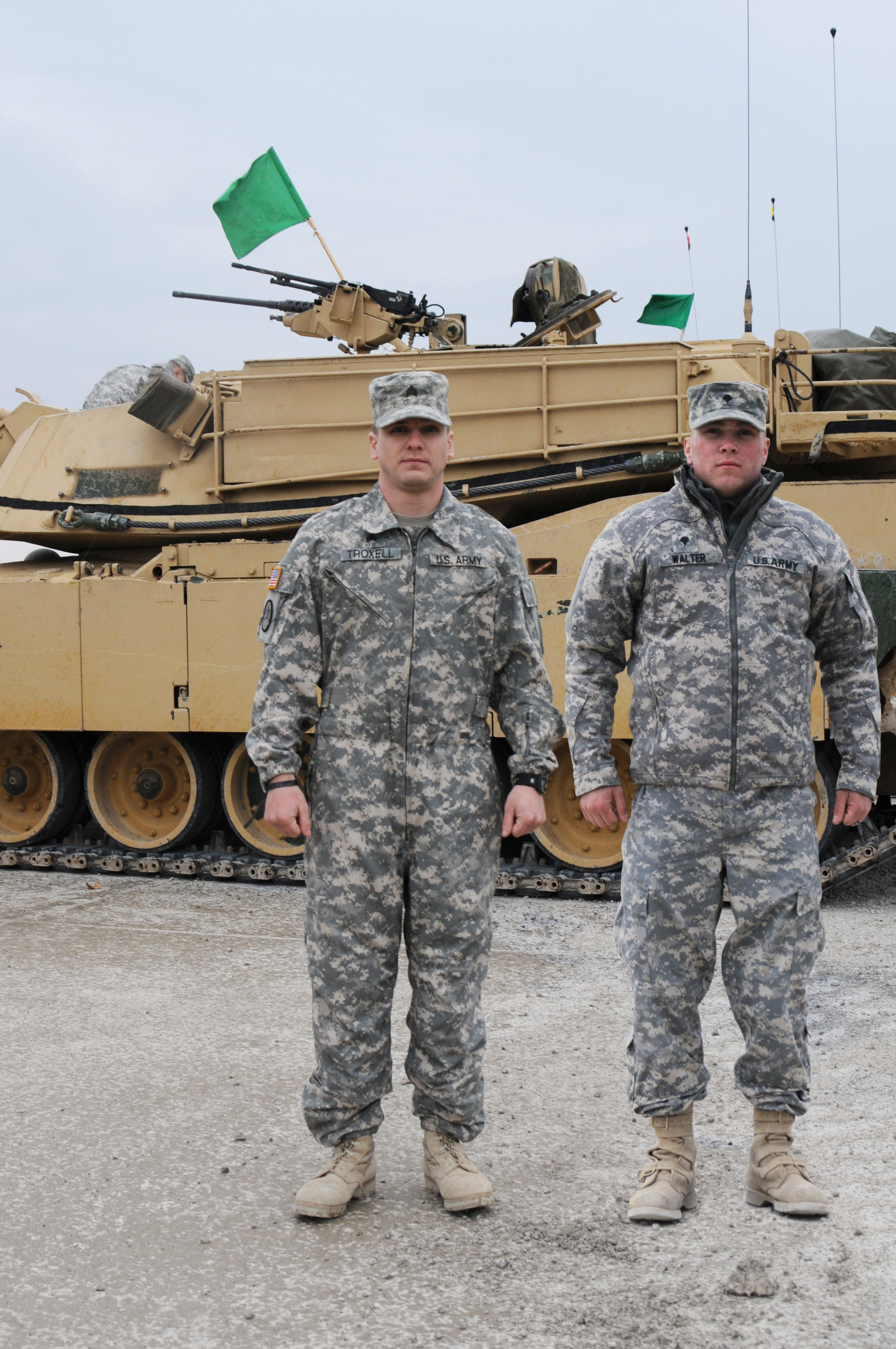
Tank crewmembers demonstrating the multiple layers.

The Fire Resistant Environmental Ensemble (FREE) is a multi-layered, versatile insulating garment that is adaptable to varying mission requirements and environmental conditions. The system consists of undergarments, a base layer, midweight underlayer, light weather outer layer, intermediate weather outer layer, and an extreme/wet weather parka. It also includes cold weather gloves, a rigger belt, and wool socks.

FREE is designed to be functional and increase comfort and ergonomic efficiency in and out of aircraft and combat vehicles. It will replace aviation and combat vehicle crewmen cold-weather clothing.

== See also ==
- Flame Resistant Organizational Gear

== Sources ==
This article incorporates work from , which is in the public domain as it is a work of the United States Military.
