= Dobbin, Texas =

Unincorporated community in Texas, US

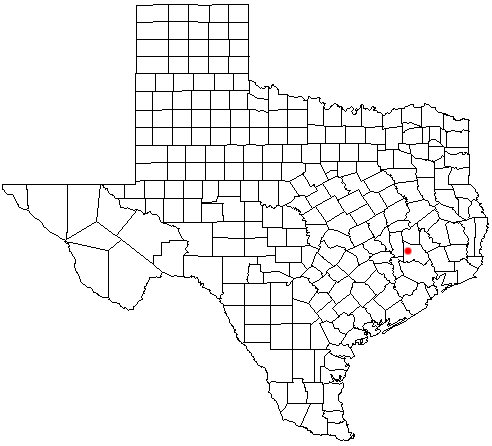
Location of Dobbin in the state of Texas

Dobbin is an unincorporated community in Montgomery County, Texas, United States. According to the Handbook of Texas, the community had an estimated population of 170 in 2000, although some estimates place that figure at close to 300. Dobbin is part of the Houston–Sugar Land–Baytown Metropolitan Statistical Area.

== Geography ==
Dobbin is located at 30°21′56″N 95°46′34″W (30.3654842, -95.7760598 ). It is situated at the junction of State Highway 105 and FM 1486, approximately 12 miles north of Magnolia.

== History ==
In 1878, the Central and Montgomery Railway built a line from Montgomery to Navasota. Two years later, a post office was established in the community under the name Bobbin. It became a shipping point for cotton and lumber in the mid-1880s and had a population of 250 by the 1890s. That number had declined to 168 by 1903. A few years later, the Trinity and Brazos Valley Railway built through Bobbin on its way to Mexia and Houston, making the community a railroad junction. In 1909, Bobbin's name was changed to Dobbin.

Dobbin was home to 100 people and several businesses in 1915. By the late 1940s, the community had three churches, two schools, two sawmills, two factories, nine businesses, a railroad station, and a population of 175. The number of residents fell to a low of 106 by the mid-1960s, but rose to 170 in the early 1970s. The population remained consistent throughout the latter half of the twentieth century.

Despite its unincorporated status, Dobbin continued to have a functioning post office (zip code: 77333) until December 31, 2025, when its post office was permanently closed.

== Education ==
Public education in the community of Dobbin is provided by the Montgomery Independent School District, but used to be provided by the Dobbin Independent School District, that had only one operating school, first to fifth grade. In 1978, the Dobbin Independent School District was sold to the Montgomery Independent School District, for $150.
