= The Boy in the Plastic Bubble =

1976 television film by Randal Kleiser

- Genre: Biography; Drama; Romance
- Written by: Douglas Day Stewart
- Story by: Joe Morgenstern; Douglas Day Stewart
- Directed by: Randal Kleiser
- Starring: John Travolta; Diana Hyland; Robert Reed; Ralph Bellamy; Glynnis O'Connor
- Music by: Mark Snow; Paul Williams
- Country of origin: United States
- Original language: English

Production
- Executive producers: Aaron Spelling; Leonard Goldberg
- Producers: Joel Thurm; Cindy Dunne
- Production locations: Malibu Lake, California; 20th Century Fox Studios - 10201 Pico Blvd., Century City, Los Angeles, California
- Cinematography: Arch Dalzell
- Editor: John F. McSweeney
- Running time: 97 minutes
- Production company: Spelling-Goldberg Productions

Original release
- Network: ABC
- Release: November 12, 1976

The Boy in the Plastic Bubble is a 1976 American made-for-television drama film inspired by the lives of David Vetter and Ted DeVita, who lacked effective immune systems. It stars John Travolta, Glynnis O'Connor, Diana Hyland, Robert Reed, Ralph Bellamy and P.J. Soles. It was written by Douglas Day Stewart, produced by Aaron Spelling and Leonard Goldberg (who, at the time, produced Starsky and Hutch and Charlie's Angels), and directed by Randal Kleiser, who would work with Travolta again in the 1978 hit musical film adaptation of Grease shortly after. The original music score was composed by Mark Snow. The theme song "What Would They Say" was written and sung by Paul Williams. William Howard Taft High School was used for filming.

The TV movie first aired November 12, 1976 on ABC. In the United Kingdom, the TV movie was shown on BBC1 in 1978 when interest in Travolta was high following Grease. It released on PAL DVD by Prism Leisure in 2001 before it finally appeared again on Channel 5 in 2006.

== Plot ==
John and Mickey Lubitch conceive a child. After multiple previous miscarriages and the death of their first son (who was born without a functioning immune system), Mickey fears the likelihood that something gravely wrong could happen to their child. John assures her that the odds of their next child being born with the same condition are low.

The pregnancy results in the birth of a live baby boy, whom they name Tod. His immune system also does not function properly, meaning that contact with unfiltered air may kill him. John and Mickey are told he may have to live out his entire life in incubator-like conditions, or a "bubble." After a strenuous four years of Tod living in the hospital, Mickey convinces John to find a way to bring Tod home. He lives with his parents in Houston, Texas. He is restricted to staying in his room where he eats, learns, reads, and exercises, while being protected from the outside world by various plastic chambers.

As Tod becomes a teenager, he wishes to see more of the outside world and so begins remotely attending classes at the local high school. He has a crush on his next door neighbor, Gina Biggs, and accepts her invitation to a beach party by using a portable chamber. However, he is deeply hurt when she leads him on romantically and then reveals she only did it for a dare. She apologizes and begins bringing Tod his homework. Gina is failing her classes and convinces Tod to help her cheat, which raises her grades. When Tod expresses jealousy over her multiple suitors, Gina kisses him with his plastic bubble between them.

Tod and his parents create protective clothing, similar in style to a space suit with tanks of sterilized air, so he can attend school in person. On his first day, Tod challenges another student to a contest of strength, which distracts him from realizing that he's run out of air. Tod rushes back to his main chamber in his homeroom and narrowly avoids suffocating. Gina is angry that Tod acted so recklessly, causing her to realize she returns his romantic feelings.

When Gina is accepted to the Pratt Institute's art school in Brooklyn, New York, Tod is fearful of losing her forever. He asks his doctor if he could possibly survive outside a sterile environment. His doctor is uncertain, as Tod has built up some immunities over time but could just as easily fall ill and die. Tod decides to take the risk and steps outside his house, unprotected. He and Gina ride off on her horse.

== Main cast ==
- John Travolta as Tod Lubitch
  - Seth Wagerman as 3-year-old Tod
- Glynnis O'Connor as Gina Biggs
  - Karri Kirsch as 3-year-old Gina
  - Kimberly Kirsch as 3-year-old Gina
- Robert Reed as Johnny Lubitch
- Diana Hyland as Mickey Lubitch
- Ralph Bellamy as Dr. Gunther
- P.J. Soles as Deborah
- Kelly Ward as Tom Shuster
- Vernee Watson as Gwen
- Anne Ramsey as Rachel
- Erna Foxworth as Neighbor

== Reception ==
David Vetter, the boy who inspired this film, questioned the film's depiction of how sterile Tod's use of the spacesuit was. Vetter scoffed at the idea that Travolta's character could simply wear the spacesuit back into the isolator without contaminating the bubble.

The film was nominated for four Emmy Awards, winning one posthumously for Hyland.

== Impact and legacy ==
Days after Bill Clinton was inaugurated as U.S. President, William Safire reported on the phrase "in the bubble" as used in reference to living in the White House. Safire traced that usage in U.S. presidential politics to a passage in the 1990 political memoir What I Saw at the Revolution by Peggy Noonan, where she used it to characterize Ronald Reagan's "wistfulness about connection"; Richard Ben Cramer used the phrase two years later in What It Takes: The Way to the White House with reference to George H. W. Bush and how he had been "cosseted and cocooned in comfort by 400 people devoted to his security" and "never s[aw] one person who was not a friend or someone whose sole purpose it was to serve or protect him." Noonan's use was a reference to The Boy in the Plastic Bubble.

The film was mentioned several times on the series That '70s Show, in the episodes of NCIS "SWAK" and "Thirst", on the Family Guy episode "The Father, The Son and The Holy Fonz", in the film Superstar, and in the "Bubble Boy" episode of Seinfeld, Season 4, Episode 7. It inspired Todd Haynes' 1995 drama Safe.

The film and its underlying story inspired Paul Simon's 1985 song "The Boy in the Bubble", using the boy's survival as an example of how we live an "age of miracle and wonder".

The film had a personal impact on Travolta and Hyland, who began a six-month romantic relationship until her death, after the film ended principal photography.

== See also ==
- Bubble Boy
- Bubble Boy, a 2001 comedic theatrical movie loosely inspired by this film
- Everything, Everything
- List of television films produced for American Broadcasting Company
