= Ted DeVita =

American medical case (1962–1980)

- Born: Theodore David DeVita; October 2, 1962; Deep Creek Lake, Maryland
- Died: May 27, 1980 (aged 17); Bethesda, Maryland, U.S.
- Cause of death: Aplastic anemia, and transfusion hemosiderosis
- Father: Vincent T. DeVita
- Relatives: Elizabeth DeVita (sister); Paul Raeburn (brother-in-law)

Theodore David DeVita (1962 – May 27, 1980) was an American boy with severe aplastic anemia requiring him to live in a sterile hospital room for the last eight years of his life.

== Background and condition ==
DeVita was the son of oncologist and researcher Vincent T. DeVita, who diagnosed his son's illness in 1972. Severe aplastic anemia is a rare disease in which the body is suddenly unable to produce new blood cells and platelets. Its victims have no effective immune system and must be protected from infection. DeVita was admitted to the National Institutes of Health Clinical Center. While scientists and physicians tried all known treatments for his condition, DeVita was isolated in Building 10, in a "laminar airflow room". This specialized room on 13-East had been created in 1969 to protect leukemia patients whose immune systems had been compromised by chemotherapy. Physicians hoped the sterile room and frequent blood transfusions would sustain him until he recovered spontaneously, or an effective treatment was found.

The "laminar airflow room" gave DeVita a living space the size of a normal bedroom. He was able to walk around and participate in many normal activities but could be touched only with gloved hands. He lived surrounded by plastic sheeting containing a door-sized space through which sterilized objects, including food, clothing, and books, and occasionally doctors and nurses, could pass in and out. He was surrounded by a "curtain" of air, a steady outflow of positive air pressure to expel potential pathogens.

== Emotional adjustment ==
DeVita's emotional adjustment to the confinement and isolation was difficult. From a later review of medical notes, his younger sister, Elizabeth DeVita-Raeburn, learned the staff saw DeVita as alternately "hostile, angry, and cheery". Especially during the first year, he indulged in tantrums, throwing things out of the sterile area in his room, and creating a cavity in the wall to hide thousands of his pills, which he hated taking. On the few occasions DeVita left his room, he was enclosed in a spacesuit and helmet, with an air pump that expelled pathogens. The suit drew so much attention that he rarely chose to leave. His sister remembers that the only time DeVita was not scared at was at a Star Trek convention.

== Media ==
His story, along with that of Texas SCID patient David Vetter, inspired the 1976 TV movie The Boy in the Plastic Bubble. In the film, John Travolta plays Tod, a teenage boy who lives in a sterile bubble due to illness. DeVita was 14 when the film, unauthorized by his family, was released. In 2004, the story of DeVita's life, illness, death, and the lasting impact of these events on his family was examined in a memoir by his younger sister Elizabeth, titled The Empty Room: Surviving the Loss of a Brother or Sister at Any Age.

== Death ==
DeVita died in 1980 at NIH Hospital in Bethesda, Maryland. His death was not primarily due to aplastic anemia, but was caused by iron overload from too many transfusions. Treatment for DeVita's disease has become much more successful, with a cure rate of up to 80 percent. Bone marrow transplants, transfusions, iron chelating regimens, and brief periods in positive airflow rooms are used in treating these patients.
