= Yale Cancer Center =

Coordinates: 41°18′18.2″N 72°56′10.0″W

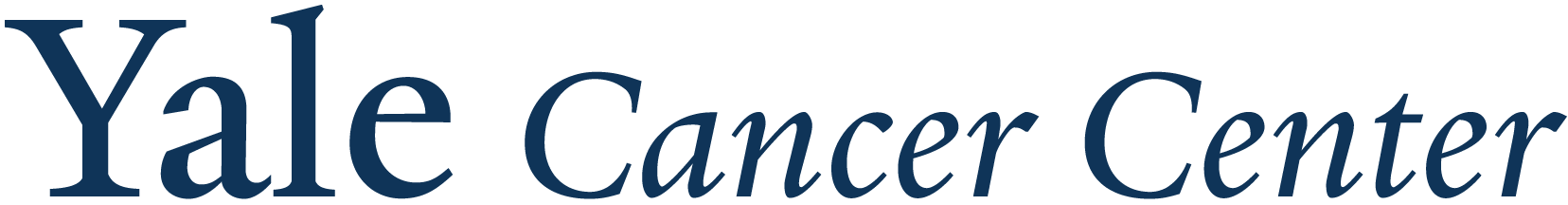

Geography
- Location: New Haven, Connecticut, United States

Organization
- Type: Specialist
- Affiliated university: Yale School of Medicine; Yale School of Public Health

Services
- Speciality: Cancer

History
- Founded: 1974

Links
- Website: yalecancercenter.org
- Lists: Hospitals in Connecticut

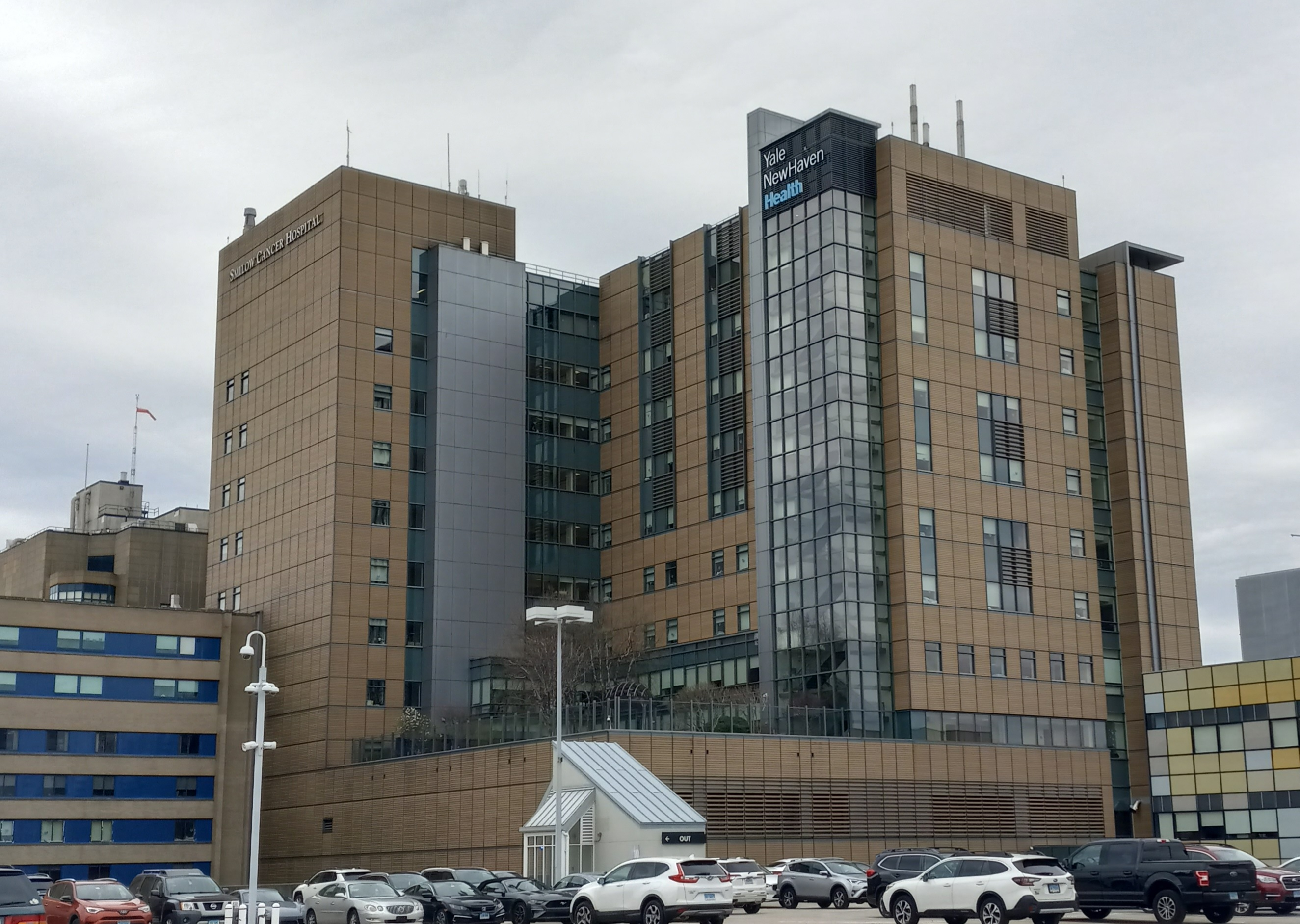
Yale Cancer Center in New Haven

Yale Cancer Center (YCC) was founded in 1974 as a result of an act of Congress in 1971, which declared the nation's "war on cancer". It is one of a network of 56 Comprehensive Cancer Centers designated by the National Cancer Institute (NCI). Currently directed by Dr. Eric Winer, the Cancer Center brings together the resources of the Yale School of Medicine (YSM), Yale New Haven Hospital (YNHH), and the Yale School of Public Health (YSPH).

== Overview and history ==
In 1942, Louis S. Goodman, M.D., and Alfred Gilman, Ph.D., in the Yale Department of Pharmacology were the first scientists to use nitrogen mustard, the first alkylating anticancer agent, as chemotherapy to treat cancer in a patient.

During a talk for the Beaumont Medical Club in March 2005, David S. Fischer, M.D. clinical professor of medicine, said, "This was the first patient in the world treated by chemotherapy ... This was proof that cancer could be treated by chemicals."

This initial success led to the development of the world's first multi-center clinical trials in cancer chemotherapy.

== Clinical care ==
Clinical care is led by Ian Krop, Chief of Medical Oncology. Yale medical oncologists care for patients in Smilow Cancer Hospital. To organize patient care, Yale Cancer Center and Smilow Cancer Hospital have developed 13 multidisciplinary programs to provide physicians and specialists at Yale Cancer Center with the opportunity to focus their expertise on specific types of cancers.

== Research ==
Yale School of Medicine was home to the country’s first university-based Medical Oncology Section, and its faculty has since pioneered many breakthrough cancer treatments.

Basic research in cancer is a hallmark of Yale Cancer Center, which draws approximately $96 million in cancer research funding to Yale every year.

The research portfolio of Yale Cancer Center comprises six research programs:

- Cancer Immunology
- Cancer Prevention and Control
- Cancer Signaling Networks
- Developmental Therapeutics
- Genetics, Genomics, and Epigenetics
- Radiobiology and Genome Integrity
