= David Vetter =

American sufferer of severe combined immunodeficiency (1971–1984)

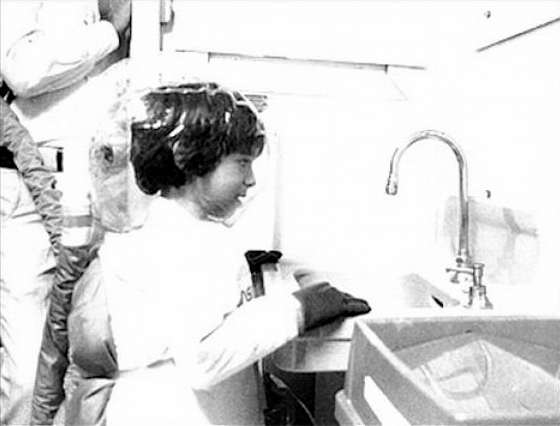
- Vetter in 1977.
- Born: David Phillip Vetter; September 21, 1971; Houston, Texas, U.S.
- Died: February 22, 1984 (aged 12); Dobbin, Texas, U.S.
- Cause of death: Lymphoma; complications from SCID, after an unsuccessful bone marrow transplant
- Resting place: Conroe, Texas, U.S.
- Known for: Having to live inside a bubble all his life

David Phillip Vetter (September 21, 1971 – February 22, 1984) was an American boy with severe combined immunodeficiency (SCID), a hereditary disease that dramatically weakens the immune system. Individuals born with SCID are abnormally susceptible to infections, and exposure to typically innocuous pathogens can be fatal. Vetter was referred to as "David, the bubble boy" by the media, as a reference to the complex containment system used as part of the management of his SCID. Vetter's surname was not revealed to the general public until 10 years after his death in order to preserve his family's privacy.

In his first years of life, he lived mostly at Texas Children's Hospital in Houston, Texas. As he grew older, he lived increasingly at home with his parents and older sister Katherine in Dobbin, Texas. He died in 1984 at the age of 12.

== Family and birth ==
External videos
- The Boy in the Bubble, Retro Report, 12:25, Retro Report

Vetter's parents were Carol Ann and David Joseph Vetter Jr. Their first son, David Joseph III, was also born with SCID and died at seven months old. Physicians advised the Vetters that any future male children they might conceive would have a 50% chance of inheriting the disease. At the time, the only management available for children born with SCID was isolation in a sterile environment until a successful bone marrow transplant could be performed. The Vetters, who had a daughter, decided to proceed with another pregnancy. Their third child, David Phillip Vetter, was born on September 21, 1971.

A special sterilized cocoon bed was prepared for Vetter at his birth. Immediately after being removed from his mother's uterus, Vetter entered the plastic germ-free environment that would be his home for most of his life. Vetter was baptized by a Roman Catholic priest with sterilized holy water once he had entered the bubble.

== Life in the bubble ==
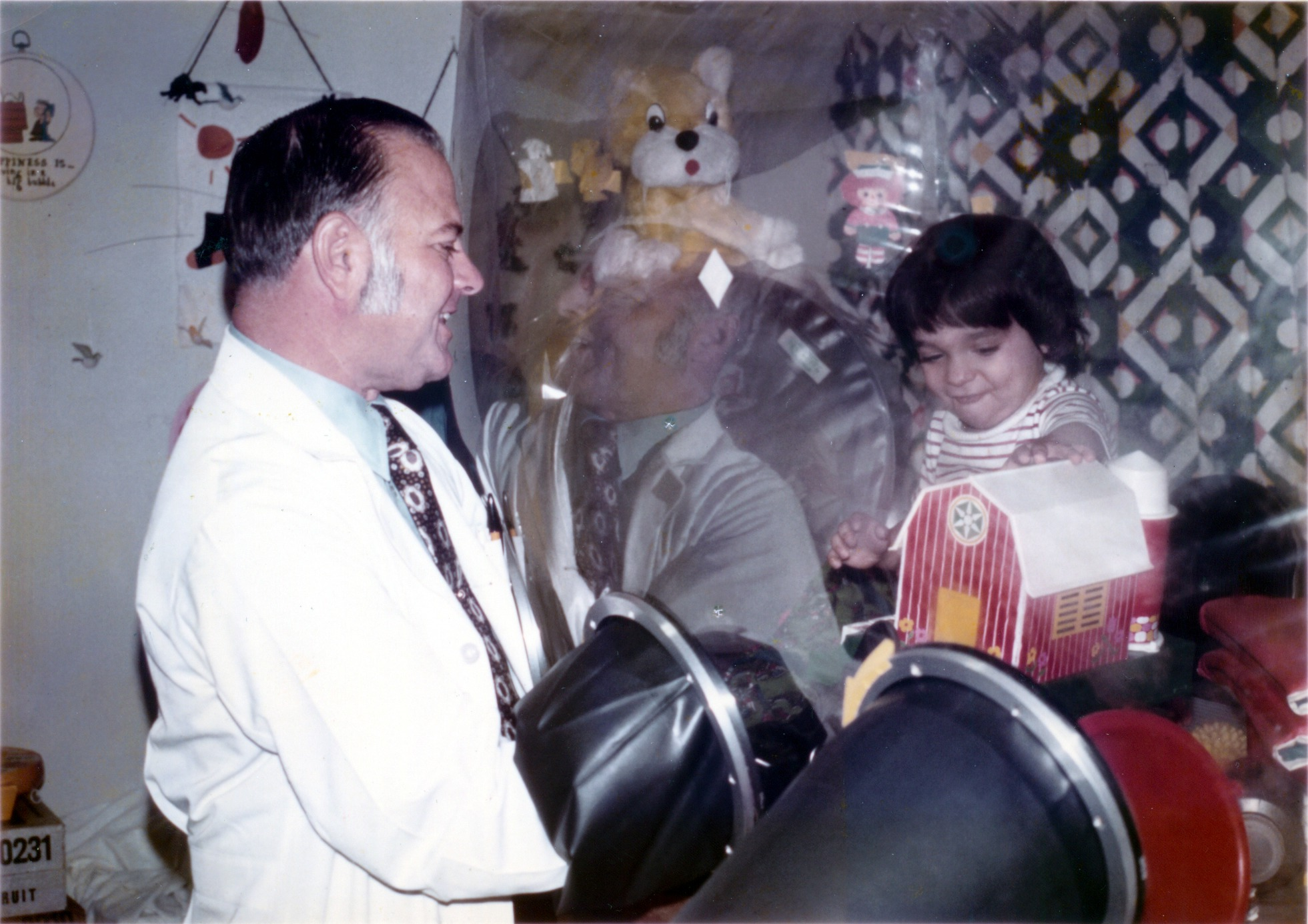
David Vetter inside his protective bubble.

Water, air, food, diapers, clothes and many more items were sterilized before they could enter the sterile chamber. Items were placed in a chamber filled with ethylene oxide gas for four hours at 60 degrees Celsius (140 °F), then aerated for a period of one to seven days before being placed in the sterile chamber.

After he was placed in the sterile chamber, Vetter was touched only through special plastic gloves attached to the walls of the chamber, which was kept inflated by air compressors that were so loud that communication with David was difficult. His parents and medical team, which included Dr. John Montgomery, sought to provide him as normal a life as possible, including a formal education, a television set, and a playroom inside the sterile chamber. About three years after Vetter's birth, the treatment team built an additional sterile chamber in his parents' home in Conroe, Texas, and a transport chamber, so Vetter could spend periods of two to three weeks at home, with his sister and friends for company. A friend arranged for a special showing of Return of the Jedi at a local theater so that Vetter could attend the movie in his transport chamber.

When Vetter was four years old, he discovered that he could poke holes in his bubble using a butterfly needle that was left inside the chamber by mistake. At this point, the treatment team explained to him what germs were and how they affected his condition. As he grew older, he became aware of the world outside his chamber and expressed an interest in participating in what he could see outside the windows of the hospital and via television.

In 1977, researchers from NASA used their experience with the fabrication of space suits to develop a special suit that would allow Vetter to get out of his bubble and walk in the outside world. The suit was connected to his bubble via an eight-foot-long (2.5-meter) cloth tube and although cumbersome, it allowed him to venture outside without serious risk of contamination. Vetter was initially resistant to the suit, and although he later became more comfortable wearing it, he used it only six times. He outgrew the suit and never used the replacement one provided for him by NASA.

== Death ==
Approximately $1.3 million was spent on Vetter's care, but scientific study failed to produce a true cure and no donor match was identified. Vetter later received a bone marrow transplant from his sister Katherine. While his body did not reject the transplant, he became ill with infectious mononucleosis after a few months. He died on February 22, 1984, from Burkitt's lymphoma at age 12. The autopsy revealed that Katherine's bone marrow contained traces of a dormant virus, Epstein–Barr, which was undetectable in the pre-transplant screening.

== Legacy ==
In 1986, the Shenandoah city council renamed Tamina School Road to David Memorial Drive in honor of Vetter. A Conroe ISD elementary school, which opened in 1990 in The Woodlands, Texas, was named David Elementary after Vetter.

The case has resulted in several treatments in film and television. The Boy in the Plastic Bubble is a 1976 TV movie drama inspired by Vetter, starring John Travolta. The 1986 Paul Simon song "The Boy in the Bubble" was inspired by Vetter's story. In 1992, American sitcom Seinfeld parodied the case in their episode "The Bubble Boy". The 2001 film Bubble Boy, starring Jake Gyllenhaal, was inspired by Vetter and the previously mentioned 1976 film; it received criticism for its comedic approach to the disease.

== Aftermath ==
Vetter's parents later divorced. His father was elected mayor of Shenandoah, Texas, in 1996. His mother married Kent Demaret, a magazine reporter who had written about her son.

Vetter's psychologist, Mary Murphy, wrote a book about Vetter's case that was to be published in 1995; however, its initial publication was blocked by his parents and Baylor College of Medicine. The book was published in 2019 under the title Bursting the Bubble: The Tortured Life and Untimely Death of David Vetter.

== See also ==
- Ted DeVita, an American boy with severe aplastic anemia who lived in similar conditions
- Aisha Chaudhary, an Indian motivational speaker also born with SCID
