= Robert Weinberg (biologist) =

American biologist (born 1942)

Robert A. Weinberg
- Born: Robert Allan Weinberg; November 11, 1942 (age 84); Pittsburgh, Pennsylvania, U.S.
- Education: Massachusetts Institute of Technology (BS, PhD)
- Known for: Oncogenes; Tumor suppressor genes; The Hallmarks of Cancer; The biology of cancer
- Awards: NAS Award in Molecular Biology (1984); Max Delbrück Medal (1996); Keio Medical Science Prize (1997); Albert Einstein World Award of Science (1999); Wolf Prize in Medicine (2004); Breakthrough Prize in Life Sciences (2013); Japan Prize (2021)
- Scientific career
- Fields: Molecular biology Oncology
- Workplaces: Massachusetts Institute of Technology; Whitehead Institute
- Doctoral students: Cornelia Bargmann; Clifford Tabin
- Website: weinberglab.wi.mit.edu

Robert Allan Weinberg (born November 11, 1942) is an American biologist, Daniel K. Ludwig Professor for Cancer Research at Massachusetts Institute of Technology (MIT), director of the Ludwig Center of the MIT, and American Cancer Society Research Professor. His research is in the area of oncogenes and the genetic basis of human cancer.

Robert Weinberg is also affiliated with the Broad Institute and is a founding member of the Whitehead Institute for Biomedical Research. Weinberg and Eric Lander, a colleague at M.I.T., are co-founders of Verastem, a biopharmaceutical company focused on discovering and developing drugs to treat cancer by targeting cancer stem cells.

== Career ==
Weinberg earned a B.S. in biology from the Massachusetts Institute of Technology in 1964 and PhD in biology from the same institute in 1969. He was an instructor in biology at Stillman College in Tuscaloosa, Alabama (1965–1966), and a postdoc in Ernest Winocour's lab at the Weizmann Institute of Science (1969–1970) and in Renato Dulbecco's lab at the Salk Institute for Biological Studies (1970–1972). He joined MIT in 1972.

== Research ==
He is best known for his discoveries of the first human oncogene Ras and the first tumor suppressor gene Rb^{p. 371-381}, which is partially documented in Natalie Angier′s book, Natural Obsessions, about her year spent in Weinberg's lab.

In the late 20th century, advances in genetics led to the discovery of over one hundred cancer cell types. Cancer cells were noted for their bewildering diversity. It was hard to identify the principles that cancers had in common.

He and Douglas Hanahan wrote the seminal paper "The Hallmarks of Cancer", published in January 2000, that gave the six requirements for one renegade cell to cause a deadly cancer: In 2011, they published an updated review article entitled "Hallmarks of cancer: the next generation".

Summary
| Capability | Simple analogy |
|---|---|
| Self-sufficiency in growth signals | "accelerator pedal stuck on" |
| Insensitivity to anti-growth signals | "brakes don't work" |
| Evading apoptosis | won't die when the body normally would kill the defective cell |
| Limitless replicative potential | infinite generations of descendants |
| Sustained angiogenesis | asking the body to give it a blood supply |
| Tissue invasion and metastasis | migrating and spreading to other organs and tissues |

Weinberg is well known for both his cancer research and for his mentorship of many eminent scientists, including Tyler Jacks, William C. Hahn, Clifford Tabin, Sendurai Mani and Cornelia Bargmann. He is currently studying cancer cell metastasis.

He is also the author of the textbook The Biology of Cancer published by Garland Science, as well as two important accounts intended for a wider audience: One Renegade Cell: How Cancer Begins (1999) (Science Masters Series); and Racing to the Beginning of the Road: The Search for the Origin of Cancer (1996).

As of 2026, Weinberg has an h-index of 222 according to Google Scholar.

== Awards and honors ==
In 1985, Weinberg received the Golden Plate Award of the American Academy of Achievement. Weinberg won the National Medal of Science and the Keio Medical Science Prize in 1997. In 1999, he received the Albert Einstein World Award of Science in recognition of his valuable and pioneering contributions in the field of Biomedical Sciences and for his productive trajectory related to the genetic and molecular basis of neoplastic disease. He was elected to the American Philosophical Society in 2000. He obtained the Wolf Prize in Medicine in 2004 (shared with Roger Y. Tsien), and he is a member of the U.S. National Academy of Sciences. In 2007 he received an honorary doctorate degree in commemoration of Linnaeus from Uppsala University. He is a member of the Royal Swedish Academy of Sciences since 1992. In 2009 he was presented the Hope Funds Award in Basic Research. In 2013 he was awarded the $3 million Breakthrough Prize in Life Sciences for his work and in 2021 he received the Japan Prize.

== Retractions ==
To this day Weinberg has had five research papers retracted where he is listed as a co-author. The retractions include one paper in Cell, one in Cancer Cell, two in Genes & Development and one in Cancer Research. This is out of over 450 publications since 1963.

The reasons given for the retraction of one paper (DOI: 10.1016/j.cell.2009.03.04) include: "Falsification/Fabrication of Data" and "Manipulation of Results".

== See also ==
- Cancer: The Emperor of All Maladies (2015 PBS film)
- History of cancer
- History of cancer chemotherapy
- The Emperor of All Maladies: A Biography of Cancer
