= Bernard Fisher (scientist) =

American biologist

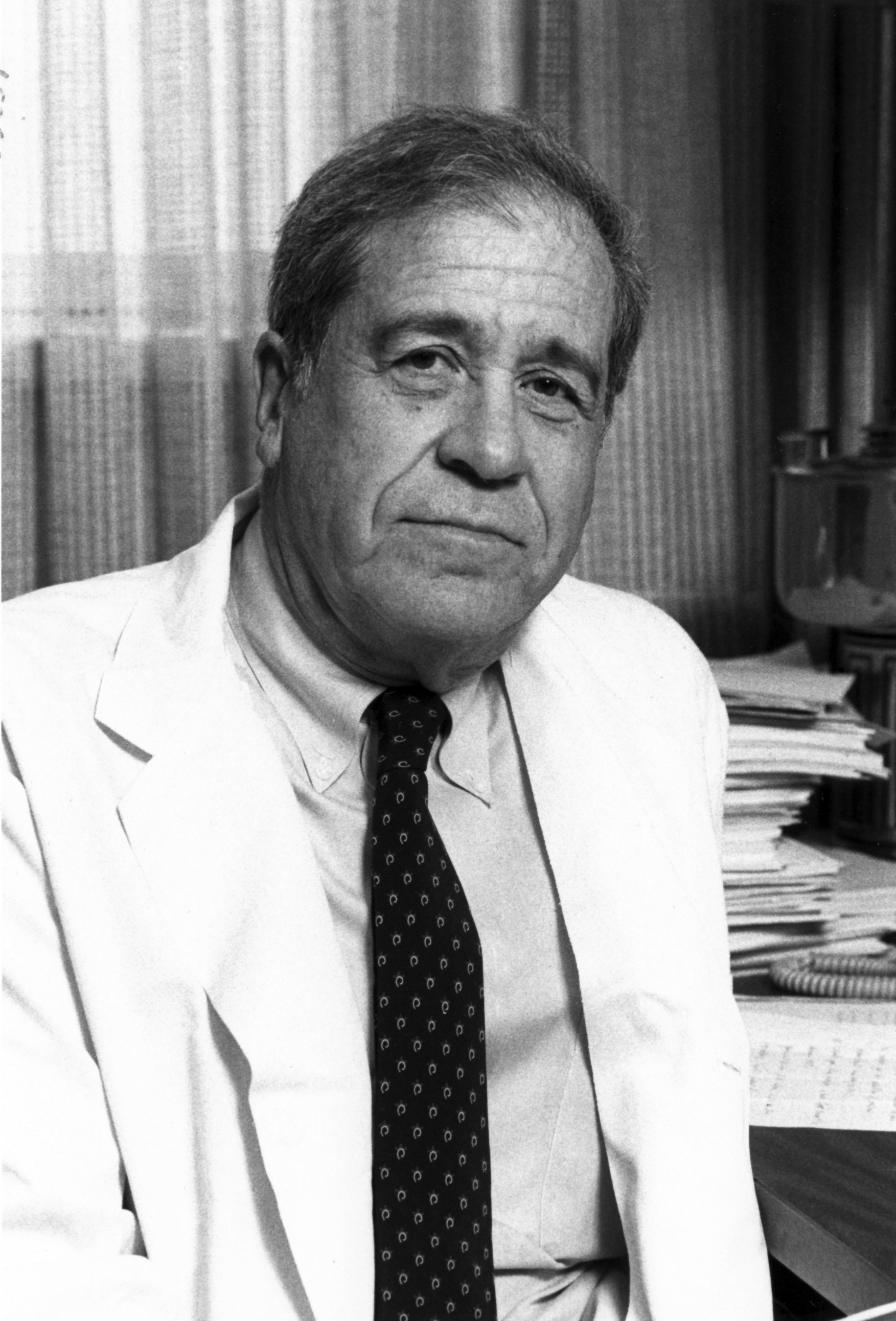
- Born: August 23, 1918; Pittsburgh, Pennsylvania, U.S.
- Died: October 16, 2019 (aged 101); Pittsburgh, Pennsylvania, U.S.
- Education: University of Pittsburgh
- Medical career
- Profession: Physician
- Institutions: University of Pittsburgh School of Medicine

Bernard Fisher (August 23, 1918 – October 16, 2019) was an American surgeon and a pioneer in the biology and treatment of breast cancer. He was a native of Pittsburgh. He was Chairman of the National Surgical Adjuvant Breast Project at the University of Pittsburgh School of Medicine. His work established definitively that early-stage breast cancer could be more effectively treated by lumpectomy, in combination with radiation therapy, chemotherapy, and/or hormonal therapy, than by radical mastectomy.

The oncology journal and website OncLive described Fisher's research as "launching the breast cancer community into the modern era" and honored him with a Giants of Cancer Care award for his work that ultimately ended the standard practice of performing the Halsted radical mastectomy, a treatment that had been in place for more than 75 years. Thanks to Fisher, notes another major oncology journal, breast-cancer survival rates have improved worldwide.

Fisher faced constant attacks from within medical ranks as he worked to disprove the efficacy of the old status quo treatment, eventually being described as "an iconoclastic figure" who brought about "far reaching changes...in the understanding of cancer and its treatment". The Atlantic called him "a medical hero". He was awarded the Albert Lasker Award for Clinical Medical Research in 1985 "for his pioneering studies that have led to a dramatic improvement in survival and in the quality of life for women with breast cancer."

== Early life and education ==
Fisher was born in Pittsburgh, Pennsylvania, the son of Anna (Miller) and Reuben Fisher. His family was Jewish. His brother, Edwin, would eventually become a pathologist, and the brothers conducted cancer research together, particularly in their early years.

He graduated from Taylor Allderdice High School in 1936 and was inducted in their alumni hall of fame in 2009.

He graduated from the medical school at the University of Pittsburgh in 1943, then completed a surgical residency.

== Career ==
=== Early surgery, research, and postgraduate study ===
Fisher was named assistant professor at the University of Pittsburgh and established the laboratory of surgical research at that institution, of which he was director. Among his research interests were liver regeneration in rats, the physiologic effects of hypothermia, and transplant rejection. While engaged in research, he also performed general and vascular surgery. He was one of the first surgeons to perform kidney transplants.

From 1950 through 1952, he was a fellow in experimental surgery at the University of Pennsylvania. In 1955, he was a research fellow at the London Postgraduate Medical School at Hammersmith Hospital, where he sought to increase his knowledge about transplantation.

=== NSABP ===
In the spring of 1957, having returned to the University of Pittsburgh, Fisher received a request from I.S. Ravdin, M.D., who had been his mentor at the University of Pennsylvania, and who at the time was Chairman of the Clinical Studies Panel of the Cancer Chemotherapy National Service Center at the National Institutes of Health (NIH). Ravdin asked Fisher to join 22 other surgeons in attending an NIH meeting to discuss the establishment of the Surgical Adjuvant Chemotherapy Breast Project, later known as the National Surgical Adjuvant Breast and Bowel Project (NSABP).

"I wasn’t the least bit interested in breast cancer", Fisher later said. "But since Dr. Ravdin was an army general who had operated on President Eisenhower, when he commanded me to attend the meeting, I did so. At the time of that first meeting in 1956, the idea of using clinical trials to obtain information, and certainly the idea of giving therapy following surgery, were novel approaches to treatment". Fisher was initially reluctant to relinquish his research on liver regeneration and transplantation and to take up the study of breast cancer and other malignant diseases, but he became intrigued by the subject of tumor metastasis. Indeed, he "was captivated", he later said, both by "the mystery of metastasis" and by "the new concept of the clinical trial".

Fisher later said that after that NIH meeting, "I discovered how little information there was related to the biology of breast cancer and what a lack of interest there was in understanding the disease. At the meeting, I learned about the need for randomized clinical trials and the use of biostatistics to obtain credible information from those trials". Giving up the liver regeneration and transplantation research in which he had been engaged, he began, along with his brother Edwin, a member of the University of Pittsburgh's pathology department, to study the biology of tumor metastasis. He would spend the next four decades studying breast cancer.

In 1958, Fisher took part in the first randomized clinical trial examining the results of systemic therapy following radical mastectomy for breast cancer. This study of more than 800 women, which was the first project to emerge from the NIH meeting, concluded that while chemotherapy involving the drug thiotepa positively affected the survival rates of premenopausal women, physicians were hesitant to begin using systemic adjuvant therapy.

=== Chairman of NSABP ===
In a March 20, 1967, letter, Dr. Rudolf J. Noer suggested that Fisher apply for the position of chairman of the NSABP. He was officially appointed to that post on May 9 of that year. During the succeeding decades he would lead clinical trials that would result in transformative changes in the treatment of breast cancer.

Throughout the 1960s and 1970s, Fisher studied cancer biology and performed randomized clinical studies comparing the relative effectiveness of lumpectomy, total mastectomy, and lumpectomy followed by chemotherapy or radiation.

Fisher's impact on breast-cancer treatment was the subject of an August 2013 article in the Atlantic Monthly that was occasioned by his 95th birthday. "Before 1971, if you had breast cancer, chances are you'd have to get your breast cut off", the article recalled. "Surgeons had been taught one thing: radical surgery saves lives. It was Bernard Fisher who changed their minds".

"For more than the first half of the 20th century", Fisher later explained, "surgery was the only treatment for breast cancer. During that time, there was uniform agreement about breast cancer treatment. Disagreement related to whether or not surgery should be more radical. Improvements in anesthesia and blood transfusions made it possible for surgeons to perform more extensive operations". Such was the situation when Fisher began working on breast cancer. At that time, moreover, "researchers theorized that women died of breast cancer despite radical surgery because tumor cells were dislodged during the operation. It was believed that the dissemination of those cells resulted in metastasis and subsequent death".

Since the late 19th century, breast cancer had been treated with the Halsted radical mastectomy, named for its originator, Dr. William Stewart Halsted (1852–1922), a famous surgeon at Johns Hopkins Hospital. This procedure involved the removal not only of the entire breast but also the underarm lymph nodes and chest wall muscles. Such operations left women with gaping holes in their chests. The argument for this approach was "that cancer cells, originating from the breast, always passed through the lymph nodes prior to metastatic spread and, therefore, required radical surgery to remove the entire breast, underlying chest muscle, and axillary lymph nodes to halt metastasis".

For over ten years, Fisher and his research team carried out "a multitude of investigations regarding the biology of tumor metastasis". Their findings caused them to question the very theories upon which Halsted's approach had been based, and led them to formulate an alternative hypothesis. This was "that breast cancer was a systemic disease in that tumor cells were likely to have been disseminated throughout the body by the time of diagnosis and that more expensive locoregional therapy was unlikely to improve survival". In other words, they believed that cancer was spread through the blood and lymph systems and that it entered these systems at an earlier stage than had previously been thought. This meant that the best way to fight breast cancer was not to perform an extensive excision of local tissue. Instead, a lumpectomy, in which only the tumor itself and a small amount of surrounding tissue are excised, would likely be just as effective and would have the added advantage of not causing disfigurement.

What Fisher introduced, in short, was an entirely new theory about the spread of breast cancer: while Halsted had posited that it spread by permeating surrounding tissues, Fisher argued that it was spread through the blood and lymph systems.

By the late 1960s, Fisher's research had established that radical mastectomy was indeed "no more effective than total mastectomy", and that a total mastectomy, in turn, was “no more effective than lumpectomy in treating breast cancer.” Fisher consequently urged his fellow breast-cancer surgeons to change their approach to the disease. Most of them resisted, however, and continued to perform radical mastectomies, and many accused Fisher and his supporters of placing women's lives at risk by not performing the radical surgery. Fisher later described the widespread resistance to his approach by the medical establishment as “extensive and often unpleasant". "For 50 years", he later recalled, “surgeons had been trained to do radical surgery. They felt that performing the lumpectomy was totally inappropriate". Hence, "my peers were my antagonists....It was difficult to get doctors to put doctors into the trials, and, as might have been anticipated, it was even more difficult to persuade women to be randomized to a study in which some of them would undergo mastectomy and others would have their breasts preserved".

Fisher's arguments received considerable positive attention in the 1970s, however, from many women's rights activists. According to women's health activist Cynthia Pearson, the “women's health movement began talking about mastectomy as one of the examples of sexism in medical care in the United States.” Fisher's ideas won the movement's support and became a political issue as well as a medical question.

Ultimately, his recommendations for breast-cancer treatment won the approval of the medical establishment. "In 1985," reported the Atlantic, "the New England Journal of Medicine published two of Fisher's studies that definitively proved" his earlier findings. His recommended approach to treating breast cancer thereafter gained universal acceptance.

=== Achievements ===
Fisher's work fundamentally changed the understanding of breast cancer and improved and extended the lives of thousands of women. To quote the citation of his Albert Lasker Award, Fisher "demonstrated that the regional lymph nodes were not a barrier to the dissemination of tumor cells, as postulated earlier, but were routes traversed by tumor cells to gain access to the circulating bloodstream and lymphatic system. Out of this basic work on cancer metastasis came a new model for the management of breast cancer based on the premise that the disease is systemic from its inception."

Fisher was "the first to show that less-invasive lumpectomy surgery treated breast cancer just as effectively as did disfiguring radical mastectomies." He also demonstrated that postoperative systemic chemotherapy and hormonal therapy could be efficacious elements of postoperative treatments, and that it was possible to prevent breast cancer in women who are at high risk for the disease.

When Fisher began to perform research on breast cancer, "it was widely believed," he later wrote, “that patients with tumors in the inner quadrants of the breast had a poorer prognosis than those with lesions in the outer quadrants". Fisher's research led him to conclude, on the contrary, "that the location of a tumor was unrelated to its prognosis" and "that there was no justification for selecting specific surgical or radiation approaches based upon tumor location".

Fisher discovered "that breast cancer metastasis is not solely determined by anatomic considerations, but is also influenced by biologic activity of both the tumor and the host". Furthermore, a 20-year follow-up from one of his studies proved that "lumpectomy preserved the breast with no deleterious effect on either distant disease-free survival or overall survival". Additionally, his work "provid[ed] evidence that breast cancer can be both treated and prevented".

He was the first scientist to reject the idea that cancer was "autonomous of its host," and to argue that “solid tumors such as breast cancer are likely to be systemic at the time of diagnosis and represent potential metastases during the life of the host."

In addition, Fisher carried out "the first women's health trial in the United States to evaluate the use of the preventative agent tamoxifen, which was ultimately shown to reduce by almost 50% the incidence of disease in at-risk women." The drug is now taken by millions of women who have had breast-cancer surgery.

Aside from utterly transforming the treatment of breast cancer, Fisher's pioneering of "the multicenter randomized clinical trial set a standard for the scientific evaluation of therapy for many other diseases". His early work on tumor metastasis, moreover, has been described as "pav[ing] the way for later hypotheses about the spread" of breast cancer.

== Poisson case ==
In 1990, one of the statisticians on Fisher's research team "noticed a discrepancy on the chart of one breast cancer patient being treated by a researcher in a hospital in Montreal." Upon being questioned by Fisher, the researcher, Dr. Roger Poisson at St. Luc Hospital, "admitted that he had falsified data for years to get unqualified patients into trials." To ensure that Poisson's bad data had not "affected the outcome of the lumpectomy trial, Fisher reanalyzed the study" and found that the results were still valid. "He notified the federal officials at his granting agency, the National Cancer Institute, of the problem with the errant researcher", and continued his work. But federal investigators stepped in, and eventually a congressional subcommittee called a hearing. "They found problems with Fisher's auditing system, potential problems with misconduct at another site, sloppy paperwork at a few more of the 500 centers that Fisher had been relying upon for data."

The national media reported in 1994 that Poisson had falsified data in 99 cases and that both Fisher and the NCI, under whose auspices the research was being done, had kept this information from the public. One journalist's interpretation of the episode was that "the same self-assured and pugnacious attitude that had helped him triumph over surgical conservatism” had “landed him in hot water".

In a Philadelphia Inquirer article about Fisher's appearance before the subcommittee, Fisher, once a "magnetic, autocratic genius", was described as "tired, abstracted, ill-prepared", with "no trace left of the bravado with which he had led his landmark clinical trials, no trace of the fierce pragmatism that made him a hero of the women's health movement." According to the article, "his reputation was in ruins....It was hard to believe that this humbled man had been, for decades, the bold field marshal of hundreds of staunchly independent surgeons, thousands of dedicated patients, millions of research dollars....It was hard to believe that the vast clinical network he had built up and run from a crowded headquarters at the University of Pittsburgh had slipped out of his control. That Bernard Fisher had been undone by another scientist's fraud and his own blindness or hubris".

The article noted, to be sure, that some members of the scientific community "flatly refus[ed] to believe Bernard Fisher could commit bad science," quoting New York cancer researcher Dr. James Holland as asking. "Do you think...the Pope takes money out of a collection box?"

But the news about the falsified data blackened Fisher's image, at least for a time. Many breast-cancer sufferers who had followed Fisher's advice and opted for lumpectomies instead of radical mastectomies were especially outraged. Sharon Batt accused Fisher in her book, Patient No More: The Politics of Breast Cancer, of a "shocking breach of trust". Amid the charges of scientific malfeasance, the NCI and the University of Pittsburgh removed him as head of the NSABP. At the time of his removal, he was engaged in a clinical trial studying whether tamoxifen could prevent breast cancer.

Over time, however, it emerged that Fisher and his colleagues had long since considered Poisson's 99 cases from their data bank and examined the remaining data, and had discovered that Poisson's falsifications had not influenced the results of the study. Indeed, the results were nearly identical.

Meanwhile, Fisher had taken legal action. After being removed from his position at the NSABP, and being publicly accused by the University of Pittsburgh and NCI of having knowingly published false data, Fisher filed a defamation lawsuit. The defendants were the university; its law firm, Washington, DC–based Hogan & Hartson; the Department of Health and Human Services; the National Institutes of Health; NCI; and the Office of Research Integrity (ORI). Fisher's suit “charged that the dismissal came without due process and that the defendants violated Dr. Fisher’s right to free speech by interfering with his right to publish in medical journals.”

In 1997, after a three-year investigation the Office of Research Integrity ruled that Fisher was innocent of any scientific misconduct.

In autumn 1997, six weeks before his case was set to go to trial, Fisher accepted an apology from the university and a cash settlement from the defendants and agreed to withdraw his lawsuit. Fisher reportedly received $2.75 million in damages, plus $300,000 from the NCI to cover his legal expenses. After the settlement was announced, Fisher said that the lawsuit had not been about money, which, he indicated, “could hardly compensate for the 3½ years lost from his work,” but about “truth and justice.” He hoped that the settlement would “act as a deterrent to those who would disregard due process and the First Amendment right to freedom of speech.” Responding to the charge “that he had not properly audited the data submitted by other researchers, had published papers knowing that some data had been falsified, and had been slow to publish corrections,” Fisher pointed out “that it was NSABP investigators who first uncovered the data falsification and it was the NSABP that told authorities about the problem.”

The apology from the university included stating "sincere regret at any harm or public embarrassment that Dr. Fisher sustained which was in any manner related to the activities of the University of Pittsburgh, and/or its employees," and "that at no time was Dr. Fisher found to have engaged in any scientific or ethical misconduct concerning any of his work."

In addition to the university's apology, the NCI issued a statement calling Fisher a “force in the study of breast cancer for the last 40 years.”

"There was never any falsified data published, and the ORI acknowledges that now in their report and also that my actions were entirely appropriate and proper," Fisher said. He told Oncology News International that he was “really very pleased and satisfied that the litigation is over and that I’m able to get back to doing my research under favorable circumstances.”

== Later career and legacy ==
After the Poisson scandal was put to rest and Fisher's reputation restored, Fisher again took up his position at the NSABP, where he resumed his efforts to establish the efficacy of tamoxifen in lowering breast cancer risk in high-risk women.

In 1986, he was appointed Distinguished Service Professor of Surgery. In 1994 he left the position of chairman of the NSABP.

Fisher said that the greatest contribution of his career "was carrying out laboratory investigations...which have altered our understanding and treatment of breast cancer". The Atlantic magazine observed, "Today, medicine relies almost exclusively on randomized controlled trials and their more sophisticated cousins, meta-analyses, to guide treatment decisions. Bernard Fisher's story reminds us of the consequences patients faced in a time before such trials were the gold standard". As remarkable as Fisher's scientific contributions, one colleague has written, "is that some 60 years into his career as a surgeon scientist he remains actively involved not just with accepting awards (which alone would keep him busy) but with adding to his bibliography of over 600 papers and with continuing to analyze and review the broad implications of his studies in the treatment of human disease".

Into at least his nineties, Fisher was a Distinguished Service Professor in the Department of Surgery at the University of Pittsburgh.

== Memberships ==
Fisher had been a member of the Institute of Medicine of the National Academy of Sciences since 1985. He served on a number of scientific advisory committees and was appointed by the White House to serve on the National Cancer Advisory Board and the President's Cancer Panel. He was a member of many editorial boards and belonged to most of the important academic, medical, surgical, and scientific societies.

Fisher served as president of the American Society of Clinical Oncology from 1992 to 1993 and on the board of directors of the American Association for Cancer Research from 1988 to 1991.

He was elected a Fellow of the American Association for the Advancement of Science in 1991, was named a fellow of American Association for Cancer Research in 2013, and was a fellow of American College of Surgeons, from which he also was awarded the prestigious Jacobson Innovation Award in 2009.

== Honors and awards ==
Early in his career, Fisher won a Markle Scholarship.

Fisher won the Albert Lasker Clinical Medical Research Award for 1985, which was given in recognition of "his profound influence in shaping the character of modern breast cancer treatment, thus lengthening and enriching the lives of women suffering from this dread disease". The citation noted that Fisher had "done more than any other single individual to advance the understanding of the clinical biology of breast cancer" and "conceptually reshaped and improved the treatment of breast cancer, extending and enriching the lives of women suffering from this dread disease....From 1972 to 1981, the use of radical mastectomies has declined progressively from 46.8 percent to 4.5 percent. Each year from 55,000 to 60,000 women in the U.S. have breast cancer of 4 centimetres (1.6 in) or less and are eligible for this breast-preserving therapy".

In 2006, Fisher was awarded the American Association for Cancer Research Award for Lifetime Achievement in Cancer Research. "Dr. Fisher's important work not only helped those who fight the disease, but has also helped prevent breast cancer in women who are at high risk", said Dr. Margaret Foti, chief executive officer of the AACR.

Additional awards Fisher won:

- Fulbright Fellowship
- General Motors Cancer Research Foundation's Kettering Prize (1993)
- Medallion for Scientific Achievement of the American Surgical Association (2003)
- Bristol-Myers Squibb Award for Distinguished Achievement in Cancer Research
- American Cancer Society Medal of Honor (1986)
- Memorial Sloan–Kettering Cancer Center’s C. Chester Stock Award
- James Ewing Award of the Society of Surgical Oncology
- Sheen Lifetime Achievement Award of the American College of Surgeons
- Distinguished Service Award from the Friends of the National Library of Medicine
- AACR-Joseph H. Burchenal Clinical Research Award (1998)
- AstraZeneca Historical Milestones Excellence in Clinical Research Award (2003)
- Komen Brinker Award for Scientific Distinction (1988) from the Susan G. Komen Foundation
- Distinguished Service Award for Scientific Achievement of the American Society of Clinical Oncology (1999)
- Pittsburgh's Man of the Year Award
- Jacobson Innovation Award, the highest research award given by the American College of Surgeons

Honorary doctorates from:

- Yale University (2004)
- Carlow University
- Mount Sinai School of Medicine of the City University of New York
- University of Pittsburgh

To honor Fisher's career, the University of Pittsburgh created the Bernard Fisher Lecture in 2005. In January 2006, the University of Pittsburgh School of Medicine named David L. Bartlett, M.D., professor of surgery and chief of the division of surgical oncology at the school, as its inaugural Dr. Bernard Fisher Professor of Surgery.

== Personal life ==
Fisher's "wife of 69 years, Shirley Kruman Fisher, died in 2016." She was a medical researcher who worked in bacteriology. Both she and Fisher's brother, the pathologist Edwin Fisher, worked with him in his early research and experiments. Bernard and Shirley had three children.

Bernard Fisher died in Pittsburgh on October 16, 2019, at the age of 101.

Dr. Gabriel Hortobagyi described Fisher as "a very, very complex man" who "could charm you off your feet in no time" but who also had "a reputation for arrogance".

== See also ==
- Cancer (2015 PBS film)
- History of cancer
- History of cancer chemotherapy
- The Emperor of All Maladies: A Biography of Cancer

== Selected publications ==
- "Transmigration of lymph nodes by tumor cells", by Bernard Fisher and Edwin R. Fisher, Science, vol. 152, pp. 1397–1398, 1966.
- "Barrier function of lymph node to tumor cells and erythrocytes. I. Normal nodes", by Bernard Fisher, Edwin R. Fisher. Cancer, vol. 20, no. 11, pp. 1907–1913, 1967.
- "Postoperative radiotherapy in the treatment of breast cancer: results of National Surgical Adjuvant Breast and Bowel Project (NSABP) Clinical Trial", by Bernard Fisher, Nelson H. Slack, Patrick J. Cavanaugh, Bernard Gariner, Robert G. Ravdin, Annals of Surgery, vol. 172, no. 4, pp. 711–730, 1970.
- "L-phenylalanine mustard (L-PAM) in the management of primary breast cancer: an update of earlier findings and a comparison with those utilizing L-PAM plus 5-fluorouracil (5FU)", by Bernard Fisher, Andrew Glass, Carol Redmond, Edwin R. Fisher, Bruce Barton, Emillie Such, Paul Carbone, Steven Economou, Roger Foster, Robert Frelick, Harvey Lerner and Martin Levitt. Cancer, vol. 39, no. 6, pp. 2883–2903, 1977.
- "Laboratory and clinical research in breast cancer – a personal adventure: the David A. Karnofsky memorial lecture", by Bernard Fisher, Cancer Research, vol. 40, pp. 3863–3874, 1980.
- "Twenty-year follow-up of a randomized trial comparing total mastectomy, lumpectomy, and lumpectomy plus irradiation for the treatment of invasive breast cancer”, by Bernard Fisher, Stewart Anderson, John Bryant, Richard G. Margolese, Melvin Deutsch, Edwin R. Fisher, Jong-Hyeon Jeong and Norman Wolmark, The New England Journal of Medicine, vol. 347, no. 16, pp. 1233–1241, 2002.
- "Pathobiology of small invasive breast cancers without metastases" (T1a/b, N0, M0): National Surgical Adjuvant Breast and Bowel Project (NSABP) protocol B21, by Edwin R. Fisher, Joseph P. Costantino, Marino E. Leon, Hanna Bandos, Alka S. Palekar, Bernard Fisher, Norman Wolmark. Cancer, vol. 110, no. 9, pp. 1929–1936, 2007.
- "Pathologic findings from the national surgical adjuvant breast project (protocol 4): Discriminants for 15-year survival", by Edwin R. Fisher, Joseph Costantino, Bernard Fisher, Carol Redmond. Cancer, vol. 71, no. S6, pp. 2141–2150, 2006.
- "The incidence of lung carcinoma after surgery for breast carcinoma with and without postoperative radiotherapy: Results of National Surgical Adjuvant Breast and Bowel Project (NSABP) clinical trials B04 and B06", by Melvin Deutsch, Stephanie R. Land, Mirsada Begovic, H. Samuel Wieand, Norman Wolmark, Bernard Fisher, Cancer, vol. 98, no. 7, pp. 1362–1368, 2003.
- "Fifteen-year prognostic discriminants for invasive breast carcinoma: National Surgical Adjuvant Breast and Bowel Project Protocol06", by Edwin R. Fisher, Stewart Anderson, Elizabeth Tan-Chiu, Bernard Fisher, Lamar Eaton, Norman Wolmark. Cancer, vol. 91, no. S8, pp. 1679–1687, 2001.
- "Fifteen-year prognostic discriminants for invasive breast carcinoma", by Edwin R. Fisher, Stewart Anderson, Bernard Fisher, Lamar Eaton, Norman Wolmark. Cancer, vol. 91, no. S8, pp. 1679–1687, 2001.
- "Pathologic findings from the National Surgical Adjuvant Breast Project (NSABP) eight-year update of Protocol B17: Intraductal carcinoma", by Edwin R. Fisher, James Dignam, Elizabeth Tan-Chiu, Joseph Costantino, Bernard Fisher, Soonmyung Paik, Norman Wolmark. Cancer, vol. 86, no. 3, pp. 429–438, 1999.
- "Prognosis among African-American women and white women with lymph node negative breast carcinoma: Findings from two randomized clinical trials of the National Surgical Adjuvant Breast and Bowel Project (NSABP)", by James J. Dignam, Carol K. Redmond, Bernard Fisher, Joseph P. Costantino, Brenda K. Edwards. Cancer, vol. 80, no. 1, pp. 80–90, 1997.
- "Pathologic findings from the National Surgical Adjuvant Breast Project (NSABP) protocol B17: Five-year observations concerning lobular carcinoma in situ", by Edwin R. Fisher, Joseph Costantino, Bernard Fisher, Alka S. Palekar, S. M. Paik, C. M. Suarez, Norman Wolmark. Cancer, vol. 78, no. 7, pp. 1403–1416, 1996.

== Notes ==
This article uses public domain text from the National Cancer Institute.
