= Donald Pinkel =

American physician (1926–2022)

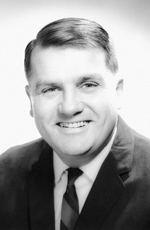
- Born: Donald Paul Pinkel; 7 September 1926; Buffalo, New York
- Died: 9 March 2022 (aged 95); San Luis Obispo, California
- Known for: Contributions to childhood cancer treatment
- Scientific career
- Fields: Pediatric Hematology, Oncology

Donald Paul Pinkel (September 7, 1926 – March 9, 2022) was an American physician who specialized in pediatric hematology and oncology. Pinkel made contributions to cures for several forms of childhood cancer, including leukemia.

He was the first director of St. Jude Children's Research Hospital in Memphis, Tennessee, serving from 1962 to 1973. He also authored or co-authored numerous books, chapters in books, and journal articles. He received many awards and recognitions for his research work, including the Albert Lasker Award for Clinical Medical Research in 1972, the Kettering Prize for cancer research in 1986, and the Pollin Prize for Pediatric Research in 2003.

== Early life and career ==
Pinkel was born in Buffalo, New York, on September 7, 1926. His father, Lawrence, worked as a hardware salesman; his mother, Anne (Richardson), was a housewife. Pinkel graduated from Canisius High School in 1944, and enlisted in the US Navy later that year. As part of the V-12 Navy College Training Program, he studied at Cornell University, where he became interested in biology and medicine. He later went back home and graduated from Canisius College in 1947. He then entered medical school at the University at Buffalo, obtaining a medical degree in 1951. Three years later, as a pediatrician in the Army Medical Corps in Massachusetts, Pinkel contracted polio. As his condition improved, he began working with researcher Sidney Farber in Boston, experimenting with the impact of aminopterin on leukemia.

Pinkel was named chief of pediatrics at Roswell Park Comprehensive Cancer Center in Buffalo in 1956. He soon began planning to relocate because of the impact of Buffalo's climate on his polio.

== Director of St. Jude Children's Research Hospital ==
Pinkel met the Lebanese-American entertainer Danny Thomas in 1961. The latter was spearheading the foundation and construction of a children's research hospital, called after St Jude, the patron of the hopeless, to be based in Memphis, Tennessee. Pinkel visited the budding project in 1961, and decided to become a founding member, taking a significant pay reduction to make the move. He served as the first director and CEO of St. Jude Children's Research Hospital from February 1962 (when it opened) to 1974, focusing on Acute lymphoblastic leukemia (ALL), the most frequent cancer in young children. His team pinpointed four key obstacles to its cure: drug resistance, drug toxicity, meningeal relapse, and pessimism among doctors.

Pinkel's team instituted a treatment program aimed at permanent cure of ALL. Called "Total Therapy," it was based on all the available relevant laboratory and clinical research and experience. There were four phases: remission induction, remission consolidation or intensification, specific pre-emptive meningeal treatment and continuation chemotherapy for 3 years. Both radiotherapy and instillation of drug directly into spinal fluid were used for meningeal treatment. Eventually a 50% cure rate was achieved in the 1967–68 study V; this cure rate continues for the children in this study 40 years later. This was the first significant cure rate for generalized cancer and for primarily drug treatment of cancer.

This four-phase treatment plan is still used today with numerous modifications. Increases in resources and trained physicians and nurses, better infection control, safer blood transfusion and newer drugs and drug schedules have increased the reported cure rates to 75–85% of treated children with ALL in developed countries. Better use of drugs both systemically and by instillation into the spinal fluid have replaced the need for radiation therapy to pre-empt meningeal relapse in most children with ALL.

== Later career ==
By 1968, it was becoming evident that Pinkel's approach to leukemia treatment was successful. He spent the next several years publishing his findings and refining the procedure, allowing it to be more individualized for each patient. He then resigned as the hospital's director in 1973, and took leadership roles at a series of hospitals or faculties in Milwaukee, then Los Angeles, Houston, and Corpus Christi, Texas. Pinkel retired from the medical profession in 1994. He subsequently taught as an adjunct professor at California Polytechnic State University, San Luis Obispo.

== Personal life ==
Pinkel married Marita Donovan in December 1949. They eventually divorced. He later married Cathryn Howarth. They remained married until his death. He had nine children, one of whom predeceased him in 2019. After retiring as a doctor, Pinkel moved to San Luis Obispo, California. His polio symptoms returned during his retirement years, and he used a cane or braces for walking. Pinkel died on March 9, 2022, at his home in San Luis Obispo, California. He was 95 years old.

== Awards ==
Pinkel received numerous recognitions for his contributions to the cure of childhood leukemia and other forms of pediatric cancer, including the Lasker Award for Medical Research, the Kettering Prize for Cancer Research, and the Pollin Prize for Pediatric Research. The American Cancer Society gave him its Annual Award for Clinical Research; the Leukemia-Lymphoma Society of America awarded him its Return of the Child award. In Germany he received the Zimmerman Prize for Cancer Research and in the United Kingdom the Leukemia Society Annual Lectureship and the Royal College of Pediatrics and Child Health biennial Windermere Lectureship. He was also inducted to the Tennessee Health Care Hall of Fame in 2017.

== See also ==
- Cancer (2015 PBS film)
- History of cancer
- History of cancer chemotherapy
- The Emperor of All Maladies: A Biography of Cancer
