= Arnold J. Levine =

American molecular biologist (born 1939)

8th President of Rockefeller University
- In office 1998–2002
- Preceded by: Torsten Wiesel
- Succeeded by: Paul Nurse

Personal details
- Born: July 30, 1939 (age 87) Brooklyn, New York
- Scientific career
- Education: Binghamton University; University of Pennsylvania; California Institute of Technology
- Known for: p53 tumor suppressor protein
- Awards: Ciba-Drew Award (1995); Paul Ehrlich and Ludwig Darmstaedter Prize (1998); Louisa Gross Horwitz Prize for Biology or Biochemistry (1998); Charles S. Mott Prize (1999); Keio Medical Science Prize (2000); Albany Medical Center Prize in Medicine and Biomedical Research (2001)
- Fields: Molecular biology/Molecular virology/Molecular genetics
- Workplaces: Institute for Advanced Study
- Thesis: A study of the role of adenovirus structural proteins in the cessation of host cell biosynthetic functions (1966)
- Doctoral advisor: Harold S. Ginsberg

Arnold Jay Levine (born 1939) is an American molecular biologist. He was awarded the 1998 Louisa Gross Horwitz Prize for Biology or Biochemistry and was the first recipient of the Albany Medical Center Prize in Medicine and Biomedical Research in 2001 for his discovery of the tumor suppressor protein p53.

He is currently Professor Emeritus of Systems Biology at the Institute for Advanced Study in Princeton, New Jersey.

== Career ==
Levine received his Ph.D. from the University of Pennsylvania in 1966.

Levine discovered, with several colleagues, the p53 tumor suppressor gene in 1979, a protein involved in cell cycle regulation, and one of the most frequently mutated genes in human cancer, in work done as a professor in the biochemistry department at Princeton University. In 1979 Levine moved to become chairman of the department of microbiology at Stony Brook School of Medicine before moving back to Princeton in 1984.

In 1998 Levine became the Robert and Harriet Heilbrunn Professor of Cancer Biology and president of Rockefeller University. In 2002, Levine resigned the presidency following allegations that he had an inappropriate sexual encounter with a female graduate student, while both were intoxicated. According to the woman involved, the encounter was consensual and blown out of proportion.

In 2002 he was appointed professor at The Cancer Institute of New Jersey in New Brunswick, New Jersey, then a part of the Robert Wood Johnson Medical School. Simultaneous to this appointment, in 2003, Levine became a visiting professor, then professor, in the newly created Simons Center for Systems Biology at the Institute for Advanced Study (IAS) in Princeton, New Jersey, where he has remained since.

In 2017, Levine, with collaborators Benjamin Greenbaum, and Marta Luksza, developed the first mathematical model for predicting patient response to immunotherapy. Their recent work extends to studying immune resistance mechanisms and patterns of evolution.

== Award and honors ==
In addition to the Louisa Gross Horwitz Prize (Columbia University) (1998) and the inaugural Albany Medical Center Prize in 2001, Levine has received numerous awards and honors. He was elected a Member of the U.S. National Academy of Sciences in 1991, a Member of the Institute of Medicine in 1995, and a member of the American Philosophical Society in 2000. He won the Ciba-Drew Award in 1995. The importance of p53 in cancer biology led to a number of cancer-related awards, including the Bristol-Myers Squibb Award for Distinguished Achievement in Cancer Research (1994), the Charles S. Mott Prize from the General Motors Cancer Research Foundation (1999), the Keio Medical Science Prize (2000), the Memorial Sloan-Kettering Cancer Center's Medal for Outstanding Contributions to Biomedical Research (2000), the Albany Medical Center Prize in Medicine and Biomedical Research (2001), the Dart/NYU Biotechnology Achievement Award in Basic Biotechnology (2008); the American Association for Cancer Research's Kirk A. Landon–AACR Prize for Basic Cancer Research (2008), the American Cancer Society's Medal of Honor (2009), and the Lars Onsager Medal (2012).

== See also ==
- Great Problems in Biology for Physicists (2019 IAS conference talks)
- "Genes, Patents, Race" (2019 IAS talk with science historian Myles W. Jackson)
- Cancer (2015 PBS film)
- History of cancer
- History of cancer chemotherapy
- The Emperor of All Maladies: A Biography of Cancer
