= Todd Golub =

American geneticist & professor of pediatrics

- Education: Carleton College; Pritzker School of Medicine
- Scientific career
- Workplaces: Dana–Farber Cancer Institute; Broad Institute

Todd R. Golub is a professor of pediatrics at the Harvard Medical School, the Charles A. Dana Investigator in Human Cancer Genetics at the Dana–Farber Cancer Institute, and the Director and a founding member of the Broad Institute of MIT and Harvard.

== Education ==
He graduated from New Trier High School in 1981 and then received his B.A. in 1985 from Carleton College and M.D. in 1989 from the University of Chicago's Pritzker School of Medicine. He completed his medical internship, fellowship, and residency training at the Boston Children’s Hospital.

== Awards ==
- Discover Magazine's Inventor of the Year (Health Category), 2000
- Daland Prize of the American Philosophical Society, 2001
- Cornelius Rhoads Memorial Prize, American Association for Cancer Research, 2002
- Paul Marks Prize for Cancer Research, 2007
- American Society of Hematology Scholar Award, 1999

== Selected publications ==
Chapman MA, Lawrence MS, Keats JJ, Cibulskis K, Sougnez C, Schinzel AC, Harview CL, Brunet JP, Ahmann GJ, Adli M, Anderson KC, Ardlie KG, Auclair D, Baker A, Bergsagel PL, Bernstein BE, Drier Y, Fonseca R, Gabriel SB, Hofmeister CC, Jagannath S, Jakubowiak AJ, Krishnan A, Levy J, Liefeld T, Lonial S, Mahan S, Mfuko B, Monti S, Perkins LM, Onofrio R, Pugh TJ, Rajkumar SV, Ramos AH, Siegel DS, Sivachenko A, Stewart AK, Trudel S, Vij R, Voet D, Winckler W, Zimmerman T, Carpten J, Trent J, Hahn WC, Garraway LA, Meyerson M, Lander ES, Getz G, Golub TR. Initial genome sequencing and analysis of multiple myeloma. Nature. 2011 Mar 24;471(7339):467-72.

Lu J, Getz G, Miska EA, Alvarez-Saavedra E, Lamb J, Peck D, Sweet-Cordero A, Ebert BL, Mak RH, Ferrando AA, Downing JR, Jacks T, Horvitz HR, Golub TR. MicroRNA expression profiles classify human cancers. Nature. 2005 Jun 9;435(7043):834-8.

Stegmaier K, Ross KN, Colavito SA, O'Malley S, Stockwell BR, Golub TR. Gene expression-based high-throughput screening (GE-HTS) and application to leukemia differentiation. Nat Genet 2004;36:257-63.

Golub TR, Slonim DK, Tamayo P, Huard C, Gaasenbeek M, Mesirov JP, Coller H, Loh ML, Downing JR, Caligiuri MA, Bloomfield CD, Lander ES. Molecular classification of cancer: class discovery and class prediction by gene expression monitoring. Science. 1999 Oct 15;286(5439):531-7.

== See also ==
- Bioinformatics
- Cancer (2015 PBS film)
- Genomics
- History of cancer
- History of cancer chemotherapy
- The Emperor of All Maladies: A Biography of Cancer
