= Cancer (film) =

2015 American documentary film

- Blu-ray cover
- Also known as: Cancer: The Emperor of All Maladies
- Genre: Documentary film
- Based on: The Emperor of All Maladies: A Biography of Cancer by Siddhartha Mukherjee
- Written by: David Blistein; Ken Burns; Barak Goodman; Geoffrey Ward
- Directed by: Barak Goodman
- Starring: Dr. Siddhartha Mukherjee
- Narrated by: Edward Herrmann
- Composer: David Cieri
- Country of origin: United States
- Original language: English
- No. of episodes: 3

Production
- Producer: Barak Goodman
- Cinematography: Robert Hanna; Stephen McCarthy; Sam Russell
- Editors: Peter R. Livingston Jr.; Karen K. H. Sim; Nancy Novack
- Running time: 6 h (360 min)
- Production companies: Florentine Films; Laura Ziskin Pictures; WETA Washington, D.C.; Ark Media

Original release
- Network: PBS
- Release: March 30, 2015

Cancer: The Emperor of All Maladies is a 2015 American documentary film produced and directed by Barak Goodman and executive produced by Ken Burns. The film, in three episodes of two hours each, is based on the Pulitzer Prize–winning 2010 book The Emperor of All Maladies: A Biography of Cancer, by Siddhartha Mukherjee, and describes the history of cancer and cancer treatments, particularly in the United States.

== Overview ==
The film is narrated by Edward Herrmann, who was himself suffering from terminal brain cancer at the time of its production. He died on December 31, 2014, three months before the film's release, making the series his final performance.

== Episodes ==
No.	Title	Original release date
1	"Magic Bullets" (to 1970)	March 30, 2015
A summary of the history of cancer is presented. Dr. Sidney Farber pioneers chemotherapy while William Halsted pioneers surgical oncology. Emil Grubbe comes up with radiation treatment. Louis Goodman and Alfred Gilman begin targeting cancer cells with nitrogen mustard. The beginning of the "war on cancer" in the United States is presented. VAMP is discussed.
2	"The Blind Men and the Elephant" (1970–2000)	March 31, 2015
The basic nature of cancer cells, the role of viral and chemical carcinogens, and a relationship of cancer to genes, are described. Several successful cancer therapies are examined. The 1950 Wynder and Graham Study is reviewed. The research of Bradford Hill and Richard Doll is covered with respect to chemical carcinogenesis. Bruce Ames zeros in on mutagens. J. Michael Bishop and Harold Varmus study the oncogene SRC. Robert Weinberg is interviewed discussing his search for a human oncogene and his finding of Ras. William P. Peters develops the Solid Tumor Autologous Marrow Program (STAMP) regimen. Tamoxifen is invented in the 1970s. It is discovered that antibodies within the human immune system can fight oncogenes. Siddhartha Mukherjee says, "You could think of antibodies as intensely, exquisitely targeted missiles made in the body to target virus, bacteria, or other cells." Brian Druker, working with Charles Sawyers and Nicholas Lydon among others, becomes interested in a fatal blood cancer known as CML following Janet Rowley's work in the 1970s.
3	"Finding the Achilles Heel" (2000–2015)	April 1, 2015
Bert Vogelstein sets out to learn more about mutated cancer genes. Following the Human Genome Project, The Cancer Genome Atlas begins in 2005. The opposite of oncogenes, tumor suppressor genes, are discovered. Further complexities in the history of cancer are revealed and new immunological approaches are considered. William Coley is a pioneer in immune therapy. Jim Allison develops Yervoy. John Banzhaf convinces the Federal Communications Commission to rule that anti-smoking advertisements need to be aired on television to counter the tobacco company ads. Mary-Claire King finds the BRCA1 gene on human chromosome 17.

== Participants ==
The documentary film is narrated by Edward Herrmann, and includes the following participants:

- Dr. Arnold Levine
- Sherwin Nuland
- James P. Allison, episode 3
- Dr. Bernard Fisher
- Emil J. Freireich
- Carl June
- Howard Markel
- Dr. Donald Pinkel
- Dr. Eric Lander
- Dr. James Holland
- Dr. Jimmie Holland
- Dr. Jose Baselga
- Charles Sawyers
- Dr. Lori Wilson
- Dr. Robert Weinberg
- John Bailar
- Dr. Siddhartha Mukherjee
- Dr. Sidney Farber
- Dr. Susan Love
- Dr. Suzanne Cole
- Dr. Todd Golub
- Dr. Vincent DeVita
- Edward R. Murrow
- Jerome Groopman
- Mary Lasker

== Gallery ==
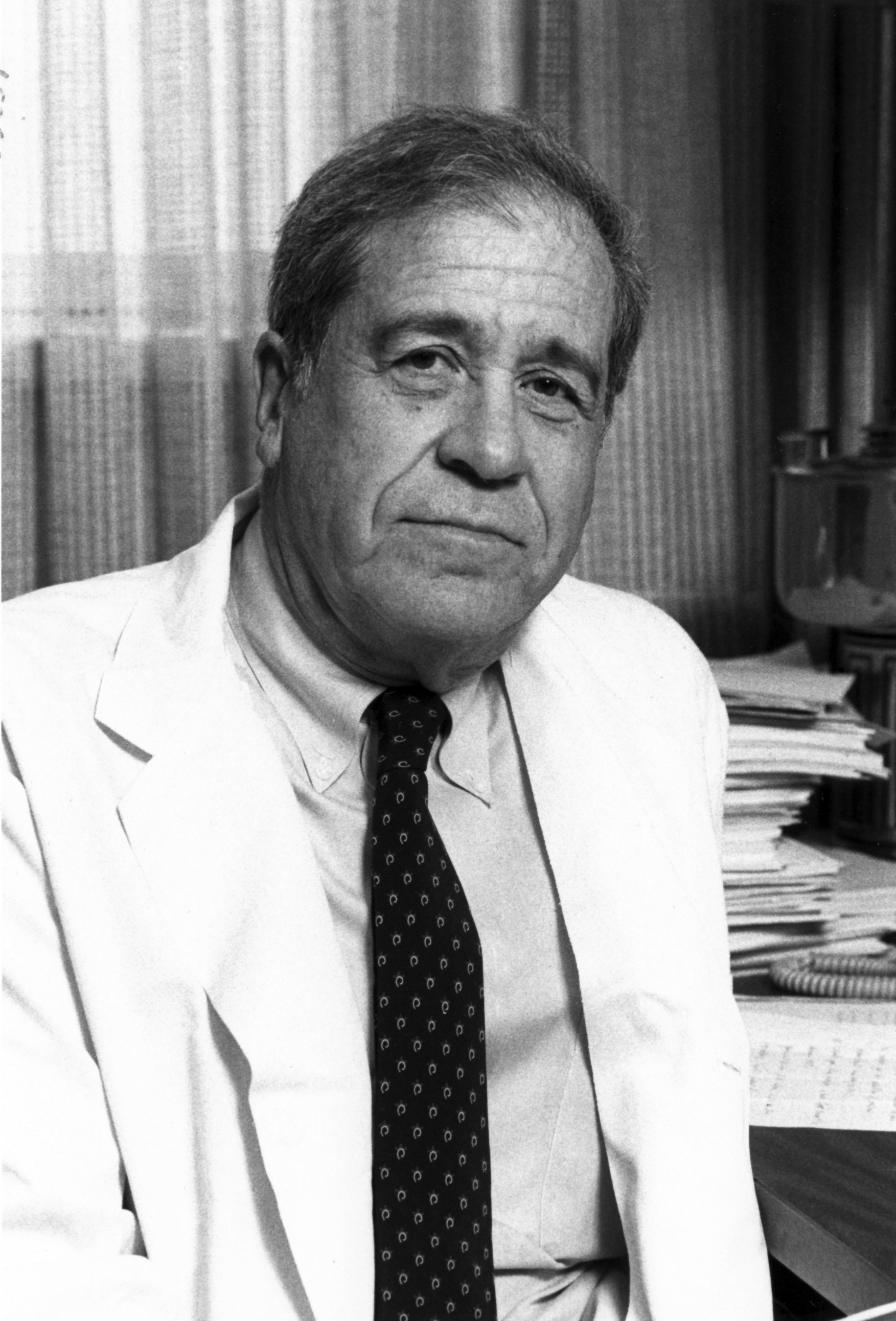
Dr. Bernard Fisher

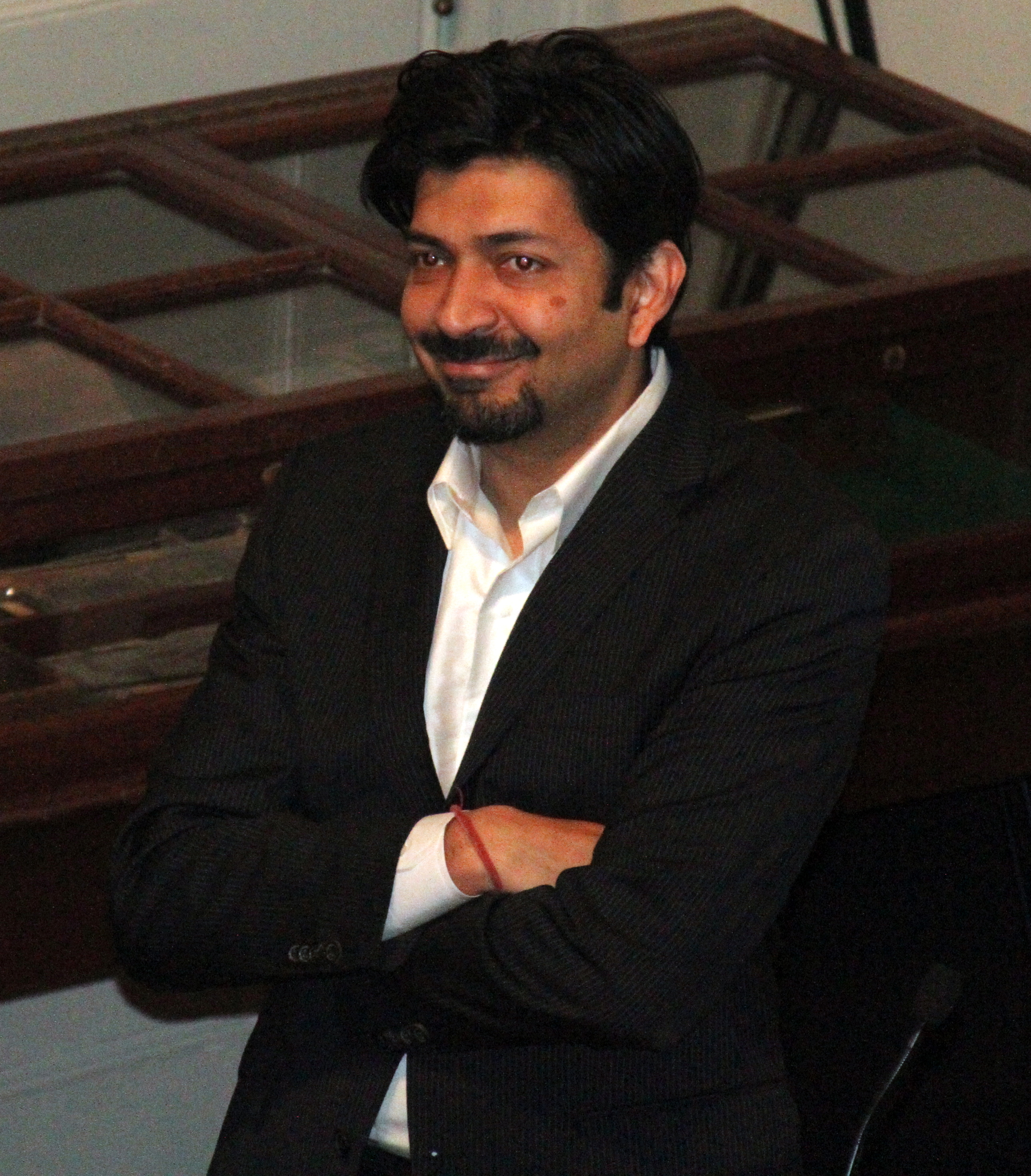
Dr. Siddhartha Mukherjee

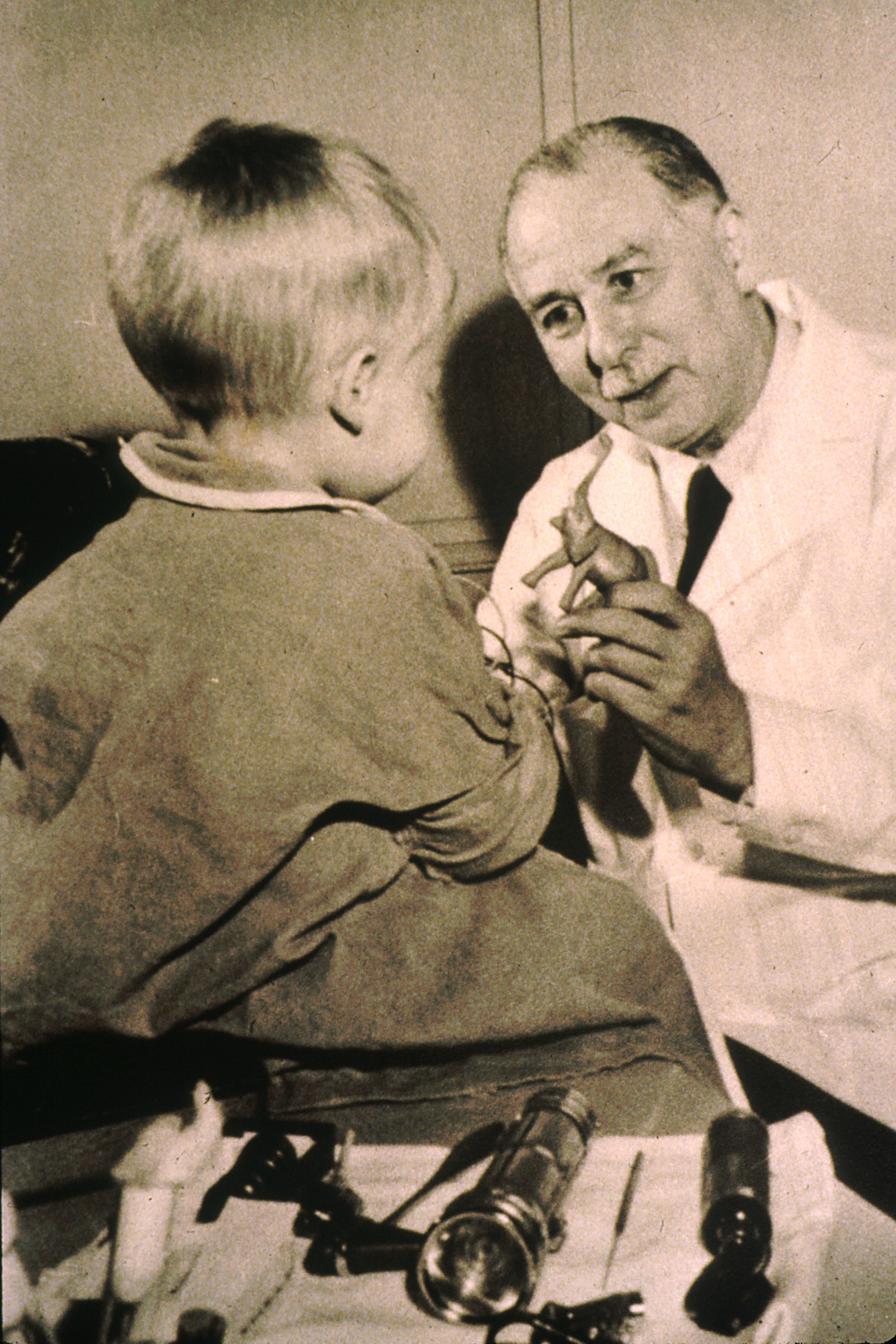
Dr. Sidney Farber

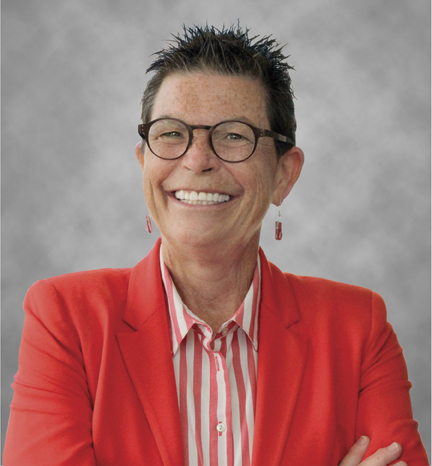
Dr. Susan Love

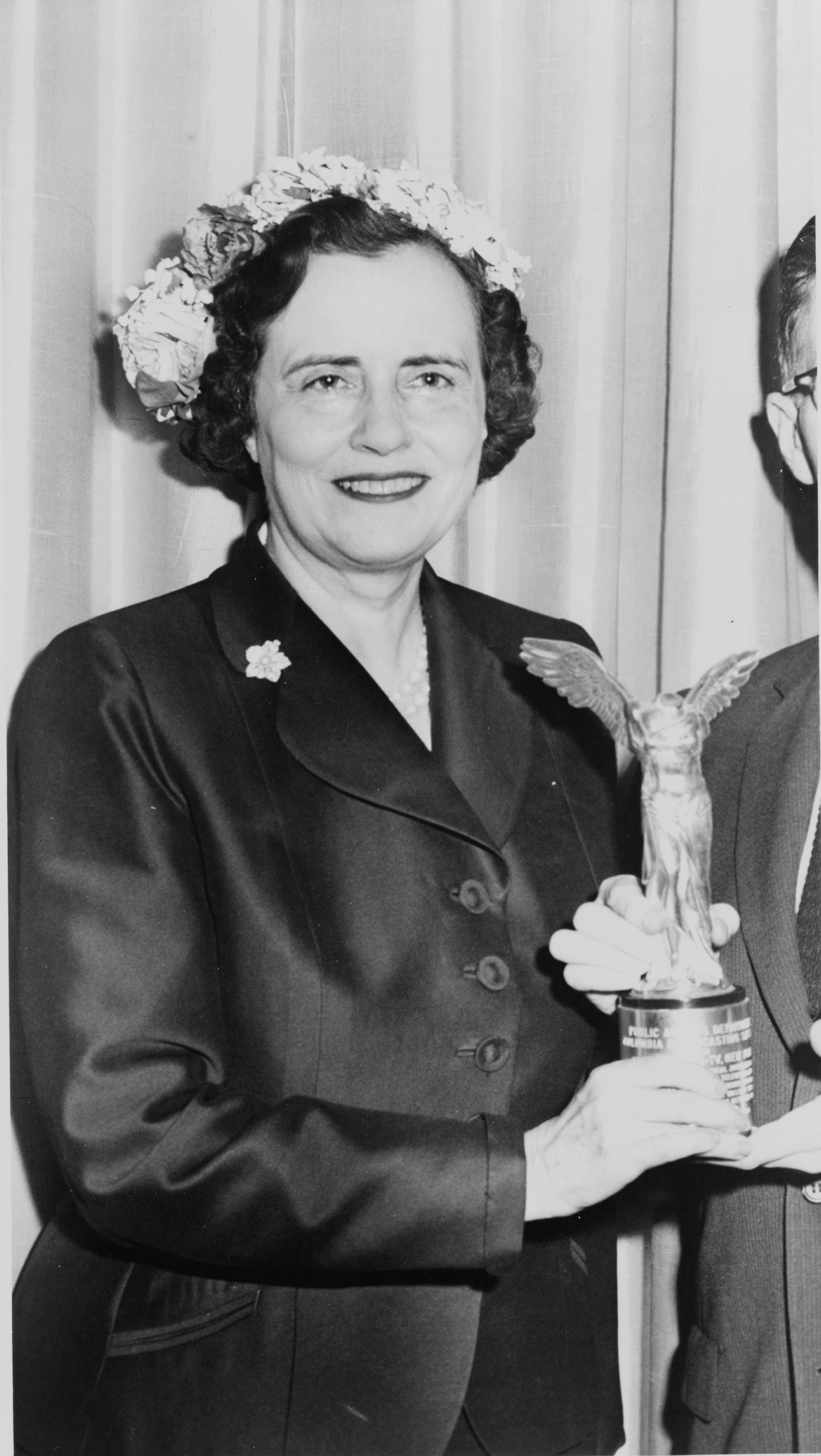
Mary Lasker

== Reception ==
=== Critical response ===
According to a review in the Los Angeles Times, the film is "the single most personally relevant documentary of this or any year". According to a review in The New York Times, the series is "absorbing", is "structured as an ever-evolving medical detective story, but the filmmakers give it heart as well by juxtaposing the history lessons with present-day personal profiles of cancer patients", seems perhaps "too much like a promotional video for cancer researchers and hospitals", and "touches only briefly on the significant issue of costs" but "achieves its main goal, which is to show the human impact of cancer."

== See also ==
- History of cancer
- History of cancer chemotherapy
- Human Genome Project
