= Susan Love =

American surgeon (1948–2023)

Susan M. Love
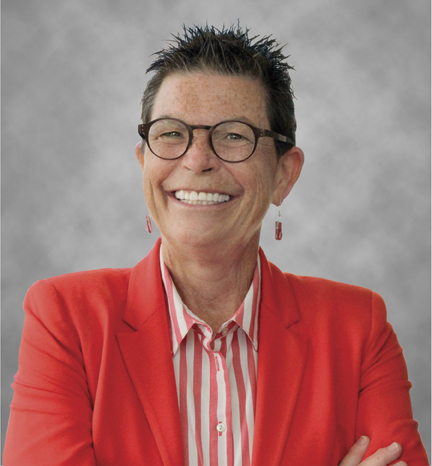
- Born: Susan Margaret Love; February 9, 1948; Little Silver, New Jersey, U.S.
- Died: July 2, 2023 (aged 75); Los Angeles, California, U.S.
- Education: Fordham University (BS); SUNY Downstate Medical Center (MD); UCLA Anderson School of Management (MBA)
- Occupations: Surgeon; activist; author
- Spouse: Helen Cooksey (m. 2004)
- Children: 1
- Website: drsusanloveresearch.org

Susan Margaret Love (February 9, 1948 – July 2, 2023) was an American surgeon, a prominent advocate of preventive breast cancer research, and author. She was regarded as one of the most respected women's health specialists in the United States.

== Background ==
=== Early life and education ===
Susan Margaret Love was born in Little Silver, New Jersey, on February 9, 1948. She lived in Mexico and Puerto Rico as a child, as a result of her father's work as an industrial salesman. Love enrolled at Fordham University after having spent five unsuccessful months at the School Sisters of Notre Dame.

Love received her medical degree from SUNY Downstate Medical School cum laude in 1974 and did her surgical residency at Boston's Beth Israel Medical Center. She also graduated from the Executive MBA program at the UCLA Anderson School of Management.

=== Personal life, health, and death ===
Love came out as lesbian early in her career, at a time when such a revelation could carry "grave professional and personal risks". She later fought to expand the rights of same-sex couples as parents. In 1993, she and her partner Dr. Helen Cooksey made history by getting approval for the first joint adoption by a gay couple from the Massachusetts Supreme Judicial Court, a state that did not recognize same-sex marriage at the time. The couple married in San Francisco in 2004.

In 2012, Love announced that she was diagnosed with leukemia and would take a leave of absence to pursue chemotherapy treatment. After a successful treatment, Love returned to work the following year, but died from a recurrence of the disease on July 2, 2023, at the age of 75, at her home in Los Angeles.

== Career ==
Love completed her surgical training at Boston's Beth Israel Hospital, and in 1988 was recruited to found the Faulkner Breast Center at Faulkner Hospital, with comprehensive care that allowed patients to see teams composed of radiation therapists, oncologists and surgeons. After leaving the Faulkner Hospital in Boston, Love was recruited to set up what later became the Revlon Breast Center at University of California, Los Angeles (UCLA) in 1992. A founder of the breast cancer advocacy movement in the early 1990s, she helped organize the National Breast Cancer Coalition (NBCC). She later served on the boards of the NBCC and the Young Survival Coalition. In 1996, she retired from the active practice of surgery to dedicate her time to finding the cause for breast cancer. According to The New York Times, Love sought "not so much to cure the disease as to vanquish it altogether by isolating its causes and pre-empting them at a cellular level".

In 1998, Love earned a business degree from the Executive MBA program at UCLA's Anderson School. She was appointed by President Clinton to the National Cancer Advisory Board, a position she held from 1998 to 2004. She maintained a board position at the National Cancer Institute, and served as an adjunct professor of surgery at UCLA. Love was a clinical professor of surgery at the David Geffen School of Medicine at UCLA. Love also served as the Founder and Medical Director of the Dr. Susan Love Foundation for Breast Cancer Research, formerly titled The Santa Barbara Breast Cancer Institute. In 2020, Love became the Chief Visionary Officer.

== Bibliography (selective) ==
=== Books ===
- Dr. Susan Love's Breast Book First Edition (1990)
- Dr. Susan Love's Breast Book Second Edition (1995)
- Dr. Susan Love's Breast Book Third Edition (2000)
- Dr. Susan Love's Breast Book Fourth Edition (2005)
- Dr. Susan Love's Breast Book Fifth Edition (2010)
- Dr. Susan Love's Breast Book Sixth Edition (2015)
- Dr. Susan Love's Breast Book Seventh Edition (2023)
- Dr. Susan Love's Menopause and Hormone Book (2003)
- Live a Little!: Breaking the Rules Won't Break Your Health (2009)

=== Peer-reviewed articles ===
- Gage, Irene; Schnitt, Stuart J.; Nixon, Asa J.; Silver, Barbara; Recht, Abram; Troyan, Susan L.; Eberlein, Timothy; Love, Susan M.; Gelman, Rebecca; Harris, Jay R.; Connolly, James L. (November 1996). "Pathologic Margin Involvement and the Risk of Recurrence in Patients Treated with Breast-Conserving Therapy". Cancer. 78 (9): 1921–1928. doi:10.1002/(SICI)1097-0142(19961101)78:9<1921::AID-CNCR12>3.0.CO;2-#. PMID 8909312. S2CID 196388280.
- King, Mary-Claire; Rowell, Sarah; Love, Susan M. (1993). "Inherited Breast and Ovarian Cancer: What Are the Risks? What Are the Choices?". JAMA. 269 (15): 1975–1980. doi:10.1001/jama.1993.03500150087033. PMID 8464130.

== See also ==
- Cancer (2015 PBS film)
- The Emperor of All Maladies: A Biography of Cancer
