= Kathryn Hunt (archaeologist) =

American archaeologist and paleopathologist

Kathryn Hunt is an American archaeologist and paleopathologist specializing in paleo-oncology, the multidisciplinary study of cancer in human history.

== Early life and education ==
Hunt grew up in Anchorage, Alaska. She studied anthropology and classical studies at the Pacific Lutheran University (PLU), graduating in 2011. She then obtained a Master's of Science in paleopathology from Durham University.

Hunt's fascination with archaeology dates back to her childhood in Alaska, where she never missed an episode of National Geographic. Hunt studied archaeology during her time at PLU. Here, she became interested in Egyptology, which inspired her to sign up for a dig in Egypt along the Nile Delta. While participating in this dig, she was able to excavate remains of Egyptian royalty from areas surrounding the Valley of the Kings.

In 2009, aged 22, Hunt was diagnosed with a rare and aggressive form of ovarian cancer. This occurred during her junior year at PLU. Around the same time as her diagnosis, Hunt's aunt died from ovarian cancer. Before her death, Hunt's aunt reminded her "my cancer is not your cancer", inspiring her to continue to fight her own battle with her cancer, although her aunt had lost hers. She later entered remission after over two months of chemotherapy and surgery to remove more than 20 benign tumors from her abdomen. Two months after this, Hunt returned to classes, even embarking on a trip to return to the Valley of the Kings shortly after. This experience moved Hunt towards researching the global history of cancer.

== Academic career ==
Since beginning her studies, Hunt and colleagues have documented 272 cases of ancient cancer in the Cancer Research in Ancient Bodies (CRAB) Database. Previously, researchers had suggested that cancer was a modern day illness that did not affect people in historical times. However, through the field of paleo-oncology, research has shown that the first case of cancer documented in humans occurred 1.5 million years ago. By researching ancient texts, Hunt has found sources referencing cancer as an illness by ancient Egyptians. She has even found records of ancient cancer treatments such as pharmacopoeia, surgery, cauterization, and fasting. These texts also listed many different plants used as a remedy to cancer, including spurge, which is similar to a castor bean, and Ecballium elaterium, also known as the squirting cucumber. Finding textual evidence of cancer inspired Hunt to pursue physical evidence of cancer. She began studying bones as the primary method for identifying cancer. Often, there are lesions present on the bones from the cancer metastasizing from other regions of the body. After abnormalities in the bone are recognized by researchers, further analysis can be done to understand more about the lesions. This can be done with microscopic analysis or through radiographs.

Hunt has been an advocate for expansion of the field. Hunt states that she studies ancient cancer to help the scientific community better understand the history of various forms of the disease, including potentially unknown causes and treatments. Hunt has conducted studies around the world, including the time she spent conducting archaeological excavation and research in Egypt's Valley of Kings, Israel's Jezreel Valley, and Transylvania. Hunt's stated goal is to establish a standard methodology for diagnosis of bone cancer. Hunt, along with Jennifer Willoughby, Casey Kirkpatrick, and Roselyn Campbell, launched an organization called the Ancient Cancer Foundation. Hunt's goal is to help paleo-oncological research progress with methodological discussion, collaboration and open access to information.

Hunt co-founded the Paleo-Oncology Research Organization (PRO) in 2012 with colleagues Casey Kirkpatrick (Western Ontario University), Roselyn Campbell (University of California Los Angeles), and Jennifer Willoughby (Western Ontario University), which later becoming a subsidiary of the Ancient Cancer Foundation (ACF). The organization is a multidisciplinary institution that facilitates research into the global history of cancer (paleo-oncology) and open circulation of that information to researchers and the public. Paleo-oncological research has been consistently growing and requires the contributions of historians, linguists, and scientists alike to further the world's understanding of cancer's historical development. The Paleo-Oncology Research Organization is working to list evidence of cancer in an online database to aid future paleo-oncologists in diagnosis of cancer in bones. Hunt and her fellow researchers hope that this database will aid present and future scientists in their studies on how cancer has changed and evolved through time. This research will likely be aided by developments and advances in DNA analysis.

== Professional career ==
Kathryn Hunt currently holds the position of human osteologist on the Jezreel Valley Research Project. She is also an assistant director of the Jucu de Sus Necropolis excavation and field school where she works alongside Transylvania Bioarchaeology. Hunt is also a co-founder and creative director of the Paleo-Oncology Research Organization (PRO).

Excavations that Hunt has participated in include an archaeological excavation for Penn State's Mendes Expedition and an excavation for PLU's Valley of the Kings Expedition in Egypt.

== Honors and awards ==
After forming PRO, Hunt was awarded a TED fellowship, and was named one of Fast Company's Most Creative People of 2014, one of OZY's Rising Stars, and one of Foreign Policy's Leading Global Thinkers. She has also been featured on Business Insider.
