= DH5-Alpha Cell =

Bioengineered strain of E. coli

DH5-Alpha Cells are E. coli cells engineered by American biologist Douglas Hanahan to maximize transformation efficiency. They are defined by three mutations: recA1, endA1 which help plasmid insertion and lacZΔM15 which enables blue white screening. The cells are competent and often used with calcium chloride transformation to insert the desired plasmid. A study of four transformation methods and six bacteria strains showed that the most efficient one was the DH5 strain with the Hanahan method.

== Mutations ==
- The recA1 mutation is a single point mutation that replaces glycine 160 of the recA polypeptide with an aspartic acid residue in order to disable the activity of the recombinases and inactivate homologous recombination.
- The endA1 mutation inactivates an intracellular endonuclease to prevent it from degrading the inserted plasmid.
