= The Hallmarks of Cancer =

2000 paper by Hanahan and Weinberg

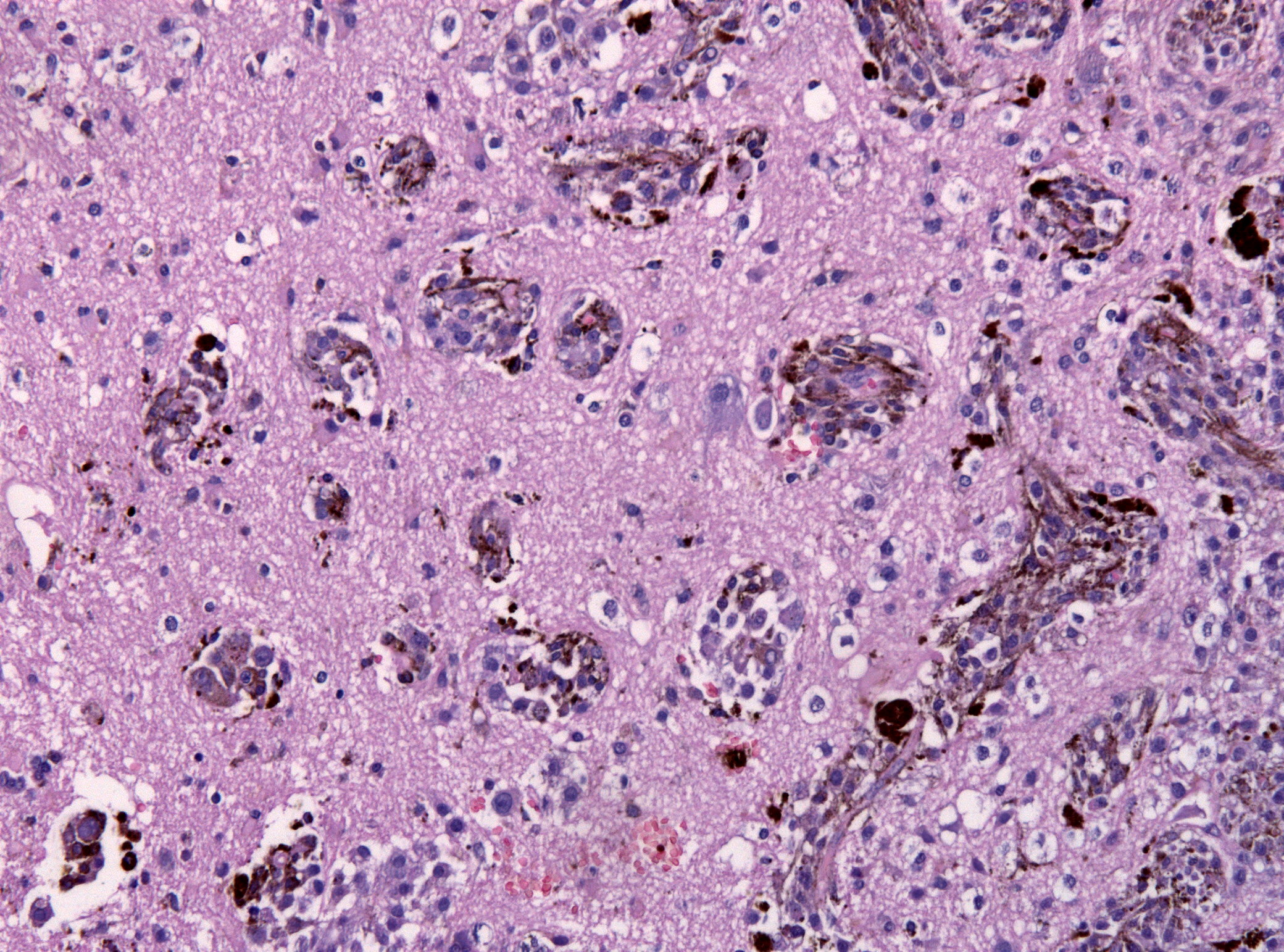
The ability to invade surrounding tissue and metastasise is a hallmark of cancer.

The hallmarks of cancer were originally six biological capabilities acquired during the multistep development of human tumors that have since been increased to eight capabilities and two enabling capabilities. The idea was coined by Douglas Hanahan and Robert Weinberg in their paper "The Hallmarks of Cancer" published January 2000 in Cell.

These hallmarks constitute an organizing principle for rationalizing the complexities of neoplastic disease. They include sustaining proliferative signaling, evading growth suppressors, resisting cell death, enabling replicative immortality, inducing angiogenesis, and activating invasion and metastasis. Underlying these hallmarks are genome instability, which generates the genetic diversity that expedites their acquisition, and inflammation, which fosters multiple hallmark functions. In addition to cancer cells, tumors exhibit another dimension of complexity: they incorporate a community of recruited, ostensibly normal cells that contribute to the acquisition of hallmark traits by creating the "tumor microenvironment." Recognition of the widespread applicability of these concepts will increasingly affect the development of new means to treat human cancer.

In an update published in 2011 ("Hallmarks of cancer: the next generation"), Weinberg and Hanahan proposed two new hallmarks: (1) abnormal metabolic pathways and (2) evasion of the immune system, and two enabling characteristics: (1) genome instability, and (2) inflammation.

In a further update published in 2026, Hanahan presented a synthesis of the hallmarks framework as it had been refined over the preceding 25 years, organizing cancer biology into conceptually distinct but interconnected dimensions, and proposed that mechanism-guided co-targeting of hallmarks could offer impactful new therapeutic strategies.

== List of hallmarks ==
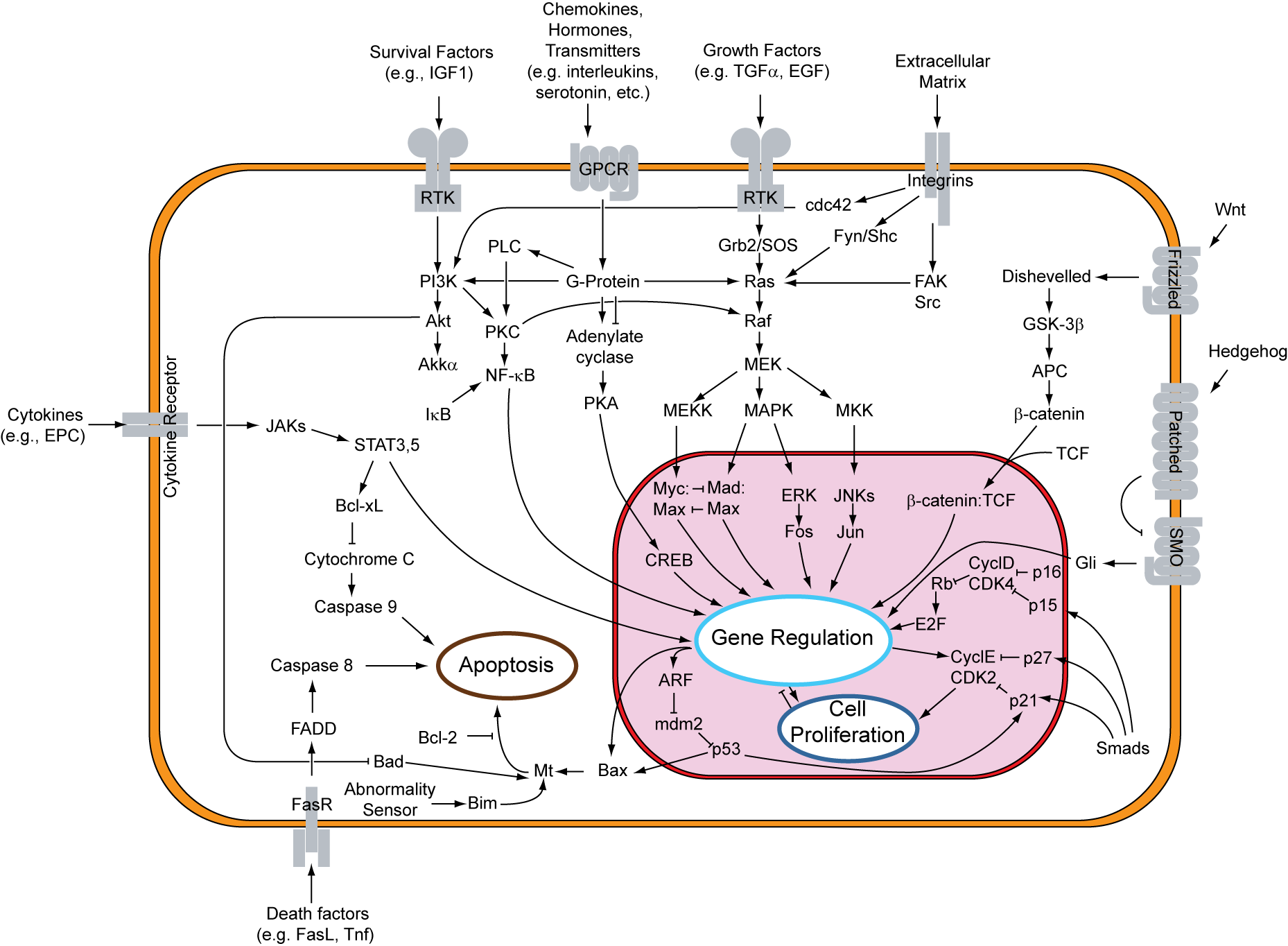
Signalling pathways are deregulated in cancer. Hanahan and Weinberg compared the signalling pathways to electronic circuits where transistors are replaced by proteins. The prototypical Ras pathway starts with an extracellular signal from growth factors (such as TGF-α). Other major extracellular signals are anti-growth factors (such as TGF-β), death factors (such as FASL), cytokines (such as IL-3/6)and survival factors (such as IGF1). Proteins inside the cell control the cell cycle, monitor for DNA damage and other abnormalities, and trigger cell suicide (apoptosis). Hanahan and Weinberg's signal pathway illustration is at Cell 100:59

Cancer cells have defects in the control mechanisms that govern how often they divide, and in the feedback systems that regulate these control mechanisms (i.e. defects in homeostasis).

Normal cells grow and divide, but have many controls on that growth. They only grow when stimulated by growth factors. If they are damaged, a molecular brake stops them from dividing until they are repaired. If they can't be repaired, they commit programmed cell death (apoptosis). They can only divide a limited number of times. They are part of a tissue structure, and remain where they belong. They need a blood supply to grow.

All these mechanisms must be overcome in order for a cell to develop into a cancer. Each mechanism is controlled by several proteins. A critical protein must malfunction in each of those mechanisms. These proteins become non-functional or malfunctioning when the DNA sequence of their genes is damaged through acquired or somatic mutations (mutations that are not inherited but occur after conception). This occurs in a series of steps, which Hanahan and Weinberg refer to as hallmarks.

Summary
Capability	Simple analogy
Self-sufficiency in growth signals	"accelerator pedal stuck on"
Insensitivity to anti-growth signals	"brakes don't work"
Evading apoptosis	won't die when the body normally would kill the defective cell
Limitless replicative potential	infinite generations of descendants
Sustained angiogenesis	telling the body to give it a blood supply
Tissue invasion and metastasis	migrating and spreading to other organs and tissues

=== Self-sufficiency in growth signals ===
Cancer cells do not need stimulation from external signals (in the form of growth factors) to multiply.

Typically, cells of the body require hormones and other molecules that act as signals for them to grow and divide. Cancer cells, however, have the ability to grow without these external signals. There are multiple ways in which cancer cells can do this: by producing these signals themselves, known as autocrine signaling; by permanently activating the signaling pathways that respond to these signals; or by destroying 'off switches' that prevents excessive growth from these signals (negative feedback). In addition, cell division in normal, non-cancerous cells is tightly controlled. In cancer cells, these processes are deregulated because the proteins that control them are altered, leading to increased growth and cell division within the tumor.

=== Insensitivity to anti-growth signals ===
Cancer cells are generally resistant to growth-preventing signals from their neighbours.

The cell cycle clock. Cells do not divide in G_{0} and are quiescent. After receiving growth factor signals, they prepare for division by entering G_{1}, where everything within the cell except DNA is doubled. This doubling includes the size of the cell. The next phase of the cell cycle is S (synthesis) phase. It is the cell cycle phase where the chromosomes (DNA) are duplicated in preparation for cellular division. The transition from G_{1} to S is a checkpoint. If the cell has damaged DNA or is expressing oncogenes or other inappropriate proteins, specialized checkpoint proteins, tumor suppressors such as p53 or pRB, will interrupt the transition to S phase until the damage is repaired. If the damage cannot be repaired, the cell will initiate apoptosis, often referred to as cellular suicide, which is programmed cell death. If the tumor suppressor genes incur loss-of-function mutations or are knocked out, the damaged cell can continue to divide unchecked – one of the hallmarks of cancer.

The hallmarks of cancer.

To tightly control cell division, cells have processes within them that prevent cell growth and division. These processes are orchestrated by proteins encoded by tumor suppressor genes. These genes take information from the cell to ensure that it is ready to divide, and will halt division if not (when the DNA is damaged, for example). In cancer, these tumour suppressor proteins are altered so that they don't effectively prevent cell division, even when the cell has severe abnormalities. One of the most significant tumor suppressors is known as p53. It plays such a critical role in regulation of cell division and cell death that in 70% of cancer cells p53 is found either mutated or functionally inactivated. Often times tumors can not form successfully without deactivating critical tumor suppressors like p53. Another way cells prevent over-division is that normal cells will also stop dividing when the cells fill up the space they are in and touch other cells; known as contact inhibition. Cancer cells do not have contact inhibition, and so will continue to grow and divide, regardless of their surroundings.

=== Evading programmed cell death ===
Apoptosis is a form of programmed cell death (cell suicide), the mechanism by which cells are programmed to die in the event they become damaged. Cancer cells are characteristically able to bypass this mechanism.

Cells have the ability to 'self-destruct'; a process known as apoptosis. This is required for organisms to grow and develop properly, for maintaining tissues of the body, and is also initiated when a cell is damaged or infected. Cancer cells, however, lose this ability; even though cells may become grossly abnormal, they do not undergo apoptosis. The cancer cells may do this by altering the mechanisms that detect the damage or abnormalities. This means that proper signaling cannot occur, thus apoptosis cannot activate. They may also have defects in the downstream signaling itself, or the proteins involved in apoptosis, each of which will also prevent proper apoptosis.

=== Limitless replicative potential ===
Non-cancer cells die after a certain number of divisions. Mutant cells escape this limit and are apparently capable of indefinite growth and division (immortality). But those immortal cells have damaged chromosomes, which can become cancerous.

Cells of the body don't normally have the ability to divide indefinitely. They have a limited number of divisions before the cells become unable to divide (senescence), or die (crisis). The cause of these barriers is primarily due to the DNA at the end of chromosomes, known as telomeres. Telomeric DNA shortens with every cell division, until it becomes so short it activates senescence, so the cell stops dividing. Cancer cells bypass this barrier by manipulating enzymes (telomerase) to increase the length of telomeres. Thus, they can divide indefinitely, without initiating senescence.

Mammalian cells have an intrinsic program, the Hayflick limit, that limits their multiplication to about 60–70 doublings, at which point they reach a stage of senescence.

This limit can be overcome by disabling their pRB and p53 tumor suppressor proteins, which allows them to continue doubling until they reach a stage called crisis, with apoptosis, karyotypic disarray, and the occasional (10^{−7}) emergence of an immortalized cell that can double without limit. Most tumor cells are immortalized.

The counting device for cell doublings is the telomere, which decreases in size (loses nucleotides at the ends of chromosomes) during each cell cycle. About 85% of cancers upregulate telomerase to extend their telomeres and the remaining 15% use a method called the Alternative Lengthening of Telomeres.

=== Sustained angiogenesis ===
Angiogenesis is the process by which new blood vessels are formed. Cancer cells appear to be able to kickstart this process, ensuring that such cells receive a continual supply of oxygen and other nutrients.

A tumor requires new blood vessels to deliver oxygen to the cancer cells. The cancer cells orchestrate production of new vasculature by activating the "angiogenic switch." This allows them to control non-cancerous cells, present in the tumor so they can form blood vessels. Normal development and equilibrium depend on the physiological process of angiogenesis, which is strictly controlled. In order to balance vascular growth without excessive or inadequate blood vessel production, pro-angiogenic and anti-angiogenic factors usually interact constantly to maintain angiogenesis in balance. Cancer disrupts this equilibrium.

=== Tissue invasion and metastasis ===
Intravasation is the process where tumor cells enter blood or lymphatic blood vessels, enabling travel to distant parts of the body. Pro-angiogenic factors like VEGF, along with interactions between cancer calls and the vessel walls, make it possible for tumor cells to penetrate into the bloodstream.

Upon entering the bloodstream, cancer cells become known as circulating tumor cells (CTCs). To protect themselves from being detected by the immune system, these cells cluster or cover themselves with platelets.

Extravasation happens when circulating tumor cells leave the bloodstream and invade new tissues. Integrins help the cells attach to their new environment. Cancer cells then form a metastatic niche that helps them grow a new tumor in a new location.

E-cadherin is an epithelial adhesion protein that plays a role in maintaining tissue structure by facilitating cell to cell adhesion. The loss of E-cadherin disrupts cellular adhesion, which allows tumor cells to detach from the primary site and invade other tissues. Low levels of E-cadherin are linked to poor clinical outcomes, therapy resistance, and aggressive tumor phenotypes.

== Updates ==
In his 2010 NCRI conference talk, Hanahan proposed two new emerging hallmarks and two enabling characteristics. These were later codified in an updated review article entitled "Hallmarks of cancer: the next generation."

=== Emerging Hallmarks ===
==== Deregulated metabolism ====
Most cancer cells use alternative metabolic pathways to generate energy, a fact appreciated since the early twentieth century with the postulation of the Warburg hypothesis, but only now gaining renewed research interest. Cancer cells exhibiting the Warburg effect upregulate glycolysis and lactic acid fermentation in the cytosol and prevent mitochondria from completing normal aerobic respiration (oxidation of pyruvate, the citric acid cycle, and the electron transport chain). Instead of completely oxidizing glucose to produce as much ATP as possible, cancer cells would rather convert pyruvate into the building blocks for more cells. In fact, the low ATP:ADP ratio caused by this effect likely contributes to the deactivation of mitochondria. Mitochondrial membrane potential is hyperpolarized to prevent voltage-sensitive permeability transition pores (PTP) from triggering of apoptosis. There are many works that sustain that cancer is a metabolic disease. This research approach has contributed to a better understanding of cancer metabolism, providing a foundation for developing new, metabolism-targeted therapies that could complement existing treatments and help overcome drug resistance in various cancers. The ketogenic diet is being investigated as an adjuvant therapy for some cancers, including glioma, because of cancer's inefficiency in metabolizing ketone bodies.

==== Evading the immune system ====
Despite cancer cells causing increased inflammation and angiogenesis, they also appear to be able to avoid interaction with the body's immune system via a loss of interleukin-33. (See cancer immunology) Cancer cells tend to employ various strategies that allow them to evade the body's immune system. This particular hallmark allows tumor cells to hide from, defend against, and hijack stem cells to avoid detection and destruction.

Cancer cells avoid immune destruction by escaping detection. One of the main ways is by expressing the programmed death-1 ligand (PD-L1) on their surface.This protein is usually used to prevent T cells from attacking healthy cells. Tumor cells express PD-L1 in high amounts which prevents T cells from attacking them. Another mechanism that cancer cells use is the downregulation of MHC I. Major histocompatibility complex class I (MHC I) molecules are expressed on cell surfaces with the role of alerting the immune system to the presence of infected cells. Tumor cells escape this aspect of the immune system by suppressing the expression of MHC I through various mechanism such as alteration of transcription factors and epigenetic modifications.

=== Enabling Characteristics ===
The updated paper also identified two enabling characteristics. These are labeled as such since their acquisition leads to the development of the hypothesized "hallmarks."

==== Genome instability ====
Cancer cells generally have severe chromosomal abnormalities which worsen as the disease progresses. HeLa cells, for example, are extremely prolific and have tetraploidy 12, trisomy 6, 8, and 17, and a modal chromosome number of 82 (rather than the normal diploid number of 46). Small genetic mutations are most likely what begin tumorigenesis, but once cells begin the breakage-fusion-bridge (BFB) cycle, they are able to mutate at much faster rates.

==== Inflammation ====
Recent discoveries have highlighted the role of local chronic inflammation in inducing many types of cancer. Inflammation leads to angiogenesis and more of an immune response. The degradation of extracellular matrix necessary to form new blood vessels increases the odds of metastasis. (See inflammation in cancer)

== Criticisms ==
An article in Nature Reviews Cancer in 2010 pointed out that five of the 'hallmarks' were also characteristic of benign tumours. The only hallmark of malignant disease was its ability to invade and metastasize.

An article in the Journal of Biosciences in 2013 argued that original data for most of these hallmarks is lacking. It argued that cancer is a tissue-level disease and these cellular-level hallmarks are misleading.

== See also ==
- Hallmarks of aging
