= Carol K. Redmond =

American biostatistician

Carol K. Redmond is an American biostatistician known for her research on breast cancer. She is Distinguished Service Professor Emerita in the Department of Biostatistics at the University of Pittsburgh.

Redmond graduated from Waynesburg College in 1962, with a bachelor's degree in mathematics. She completed a master's degree in 1963 and a doctorate in 1966 in biostatistics from the University of Pittsburgh. She remained at Pittsburgh as a faculty member, and chaired the department from 1983 to 1996, when she took a second adjunct position in the Department of Biometry and Epidemiology at the Medical University of South Carolina. In 1997 she became Distinguished Service Professor of Public Health at Pittsburgh, and from 1997 to 2002 she served as a vice dean, first for faculty and later for academic affairs. She retired in 2012.

In 1994, a breast cancer study led by Redmond and Bernard Fisher came under fire after it was discovered that another researcher in the study, Roger Poisson, had falsified data. Fisher determined that the remaining data supported the study results, but he was removed from the directorship of the project, and Redmond was placed on leave from her professorship. By 1997, the United States Office of Research Integrity agreed that both Fisher and Redmond should be held blameless, and Redmond returned to her position.

Redmond became a fellow of the American Statistical Association and of the American College of Epidemiology in 1982. She was elected as a fellow of the American Association for the Advancement of Science in 2005, and of the Society for Clinical Trials in 2013.
