= Douglas Hanahan =

American biologist

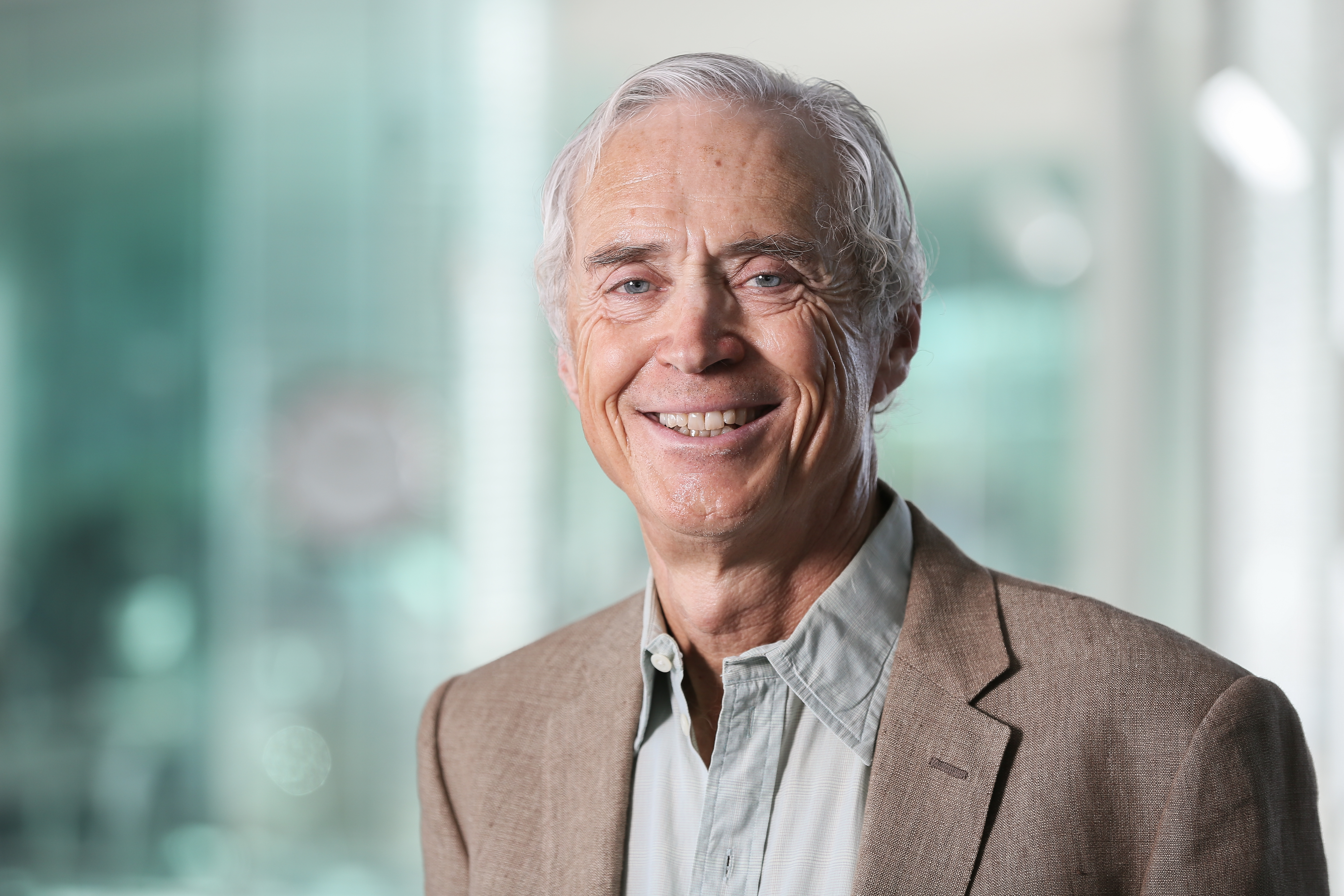
- Hanahan in 2017 at EPFL
- Born: 1951 (age 74–75); Seattle, Washington
- Education: Massachusetts Institute of Technology (BSc); Harvard University (PhD)
- Known for: "The Hallmarks of Cancer" "DH5-Alpha Cell" named after him
- Awards: 2023 Elected to the Royal Society; 2014 AACR Lifetime Achievement Award in Cancer Research; 2009 Elected to the National Academy of Sciences; 2008 Elected to the National Academy of Medicine; 2007 Elected Fellow of the American Academy of Arts and Sciences
- Scientific career
- Fields: Cancer biology
- Workplaces: Ludwig Institute for Cancer Research; École Polytechnique Fédérale de Lausanne; University of California, San Francisco; Cold Spring Harbor Laboratory

Douglas Hanahan (born 1951) is an American biologist, professor, and Director Emeritus of the Swiss Institute for Experimental Cancer Research at EPFL (École polytechnique Fédérale de Lausanne) in Lausanne, Switzerland. He is a Distinguished Scholar at the Lausanne branch of the Ludwig Institute for Cancer Research.

== Education and early career ==
Hanahan received a bachelor's degree in physics from the Massachusetts Institute of Technology (MIT) in 1976 and earned his Ph.D. in biophysics from Harvard University in 1983 as a Harvard Society of Fellows member.

He conducted research at Cold Spring Harbor Laboratory, first as a graduate student and later as a faculty member. During his tenure, he developed methodologies to facilitate the molecular cloning of genes in E. coli, a foundational tool in life sciences.

== Research ==
Hanahan pioneered the genetic engineering of transgenic mouse models to study human cancer. In collaboration with Judah Folkman, he discovered the “angiogenic switch,” a process that enables new blood vessel formation and facilitates tumor progression towards malignancy.

Dr. Hanahan spent twenty-one years at the University of California San Francisco, in the UCSF Diabetes Center prior to EPFL in 2009. During that time (2000), Hanahan co-authored a seminal paper with Robert Weinberg entitled The Hallmarks of Cancer, which proposed a conceptual framework for understanding the complexity of cancer development. This was followed by updated reviews in 2011, 2022 and 2026.

He was instrumental in founding the Swiss Cancer Center Leman (SCCL), the first comprehensive cancer center in Switzerland. Hanahan also played a key role in developing the Agora Translational Cancer Research Center, a collaborative facility designed to advance cancer research and therapy.

== Awards and honors ==
- 2025 Pezcoller Foundation–AACR International Award for Extraordinary Achievement in Cancer Research
- 2023 Elected to the Royal Society of London
- 2020 Distinguished Scholar, Ludwig Institute for Cancer Research
- 2014 Fellow of the AACR Academy
- 2014 AACR Lifetime Achievement Award in Cancer Research
- 2010 Elected Member, European Molecular Biology Organization
- 2009 Elected Member, National Academy of Sciences
- 2008 Elected Member, National Academy of Medicine
- 2007 Elected Fellow, American Academy of Arts and Sciences
- 1993 Grand Prize for Biology, National Cancer Association of France

== See also ==
- Swiss Cancer Centre
- The Hallmarks of Cancer
