= Emil Grubbe =

American medical researcher (1875–1960)

Émil Herman Grubbé (1 January 1875 — 26 March 1960) was possibly the first American to use X-rays as a treatment for cancer (versus detection) but this is disputed and no reliable contemporary source of this claim exists. He was born in Chicago, and received his medical training at a homeopathic institute: the Hahnemann Medical College of Chicago. It was there that Grubbe assembled the first X-ray machine in Chicago in 1896, and that same year, used it to treat a woman with recurrent carcinoma of the breast (disputed). He assembled the machine and began to use it in treatments less than a year after Wilhelm Röntgen announced his discovery of the X-ray. By 1960, Grubbe had instructed over 7000 other doctors in the medical use of X-rays. In the course of his lifetime, he underwent more than 90 operations for multiple cancers caused by his intense, ongoing exposure to radiation, a disease from which he died. Honors were bestowed upon Grubbe by numerous institutions, including the American Cancer Society. He was also a fellow of the American College of Physicians. Grubbe left money in his will to the Chicago Radiological Society to fund the Grubbe Memorial Award.

== See also ==
- History of radiation therapy
