= The Emperor of All Maladies =

2010 book by Siddhartha Mukherjee

The Emperor of All Maladies: A Biography of Cancer
- Cover of The Emperor of All Maladies
- Author: Siddhartha Mukherjee
- Language: English
- Subject: Cancer
- Genre: Nonfiction
- Publisher: Scribner
- Publication date: 16 November 2010
- Publication place: United States
- Pages: 592
- ISBN: 978-1-4391-0795-9

The Emperor of All Maladies: A Biography of Cancer is a book written by Siddhartha Mukherjee, an Indian-born American physician and oncologist. It won the Pulitzer Prize for General Nonfiction.

== Title ==
The book explains its title in its author's note:

In a sense, this is a military history—one in which the adversary is formless, timeless, and pervasive. Here, too, there are victories and losses, campaigns upon campaigns, heroes and hubris, survival and resilience—and inevitably, the wounded, the condemned, the forgotten, the dead. In the end, cancer truly emerges, as a nineteenth-century surgeon once wrote in a book's frontispiece, as "the emperor of all maladies, the king of terrors."

== Content ==
The book weaves together Mukherjee's experiences as a hematology/oncology fellow at Massachusetts General Hospital as well as the history of cancer treatment and research. Mukherjee gives the history of cancer from its first identification 4,600 years ago by the Egyptian physician Imhotep. In 440 BC, the Greek historian Herodotus recorded the first breast tumor excision of Atossa, the queen of Persia and the daughter of Cyrus, by a Greek slave named Democedes. The procedure was believed to have been successful, and appears to have been so (at least temporarily).

The Greeks had no understanding of cells, but they were familiar with hydraulics. Hippocrates thus considered illness to be an imbalance of four cardinal fluids: blood, black bile, yellow bile, phlegm. Galen applied this idea to cancer, believing it to be an imbalance of black bile. Galen's theory was later challenged by the work of Andreas Vaselius and Matthew Baille, whose dissections of human bodies failed to reveal black bile.

In the 19th century, surgeons devised various approaches to remove tumors, like William Halsted and the radical mastectomy. Additionally, Emil Grubbe used X-rays to treat cancer, thus identifying another treatment modality. Rudolf Virchow first observed leukemia, and Franz Ernst Christian Neumann localized the pathology to the bone marrow.

In the 20th century, cancer became the second most common cause of death after heart disease in the United States. Sidney Farber induced temporary remission in pediatric leukemia using antifolates developed by Yellapragada Subbarow. Louis Goodman and Alfred Gilman also used nitrogen mustard to treat lymphoma. The National Cancer Institute (NCI) introduced clinical trials to test the efficacy of chemotherapy. Recognizing the possibility for a cure, Farber sought funding for his efforts through The Jimmy Fund and Mary Lasker. Inspired by the Space Race, Farber and Lasker appealed to the nation and President Nixon to enact legislation for the war on cancer, resulting in the passage of the National Cancer Act of 1971 and increased funding for the NCI.

The book also reviews the origins of hospice and palliative medicine and cancer screening.

According to Mukherjee, the book was a response to the demand of a patient: "I'm willing to go on fighting, but I need to know what it is that I'm battling." Mukherjee states that two of his influences for the book were Randy Shilts' And the Band Played On and Richard Rhodes' The Making of the Atomic Bomb, but the defining moment for him was "when he conceived of his book as a biography".

=== 2025 updated edition ===
In November 2025, Scribner published an updated edition of The Emperor of All Maladies, marking fifteen years since the book's original publication. The revised edition runs to 720 pages (ISBN 978-1-6680-4703-3) and adds a new final part, "The Emperor's New Journey: 2010 to 2025 and Beyond," comprising four chapters — "The Carcinogen Hunters," "Blood, Hope, and the Holy Grail," "The View From Ninth Avenue," and "Body Within a Body: The Quest for the Host" — covering developments in cancer detection, prevention, treatment, and understanding since 2010.

"The Carcinogen Hunters" examines efforts to identify causes of cancer, contrasting epidemiological and laboratory approaches and centering on Harald zur Hausen's discovery that human papillomavirus causes cervical cancer, which led to a preventive vaccine. The closing chapter, "Body Within a Body: The Quest for the Host," reframes tumors as ecosystems shaped by their surrounding microenvironment rather than isolated malignant cells. The remaining two chapters address advances in cancer screening and treatment, respectively, including blood-based early-detection tests, immunotherapy, and targeted therapies.

== Reception ==
The Emperor of All Maladies won the 2011 Pulitzer Prize for General Nonfiction: the jury called it "an elegant inquiry, at once clinical and personal". The Guardian notes the literary allusiveness: "It takes some nerve to echo the first line of Anna Karenina and infer that the story of a disease is capable of bearing a Tolstoyan treatment. But that is, breathtakingly, what Mukherjee pulls off. Mukherjee manages to convey not only a forensically precise picture of what he sees, but a shiver too, of what he feels." Literary Review commended Mukherjee's narrative: "It is so well written, and the science is so clearly explained, that it reads almost like a detective story—which, of course, it is."

It was included on Time's list of the 100 most influential books of the last 100 years, and The New York Times Magazine's list of the 100 best works of nonfiction.

== Awards and honours ==
- 2011: Pulitzer Prize for General Nonfiction, winner
- 2011: PEN/E. O. Wilson Literary Science Writing Award, winner (inaugural)
- 2011: Guardian First Book Award, winner
- 2011: Wellcome Trust Book Prize, shortlist
- 2010: New York Times Best Books of the Year
- 2010: New York Times Notable Book of the Year
- 2010: New York Times Bestseller
- 2010: TIME Magazine's Best Books of the Year
- 2010: National Book Critics Circle Award, finalist
- 2010: Los Angeles Times Book Prize, finalist

== Translations ==
- 2011: Italian: L' imperatore del male. Una biografia del cancro, Neri Pozza (ISBN 978-88-545-0331-1).
- 2011: Korean: 암 : 만병의 황제의 역사, 이한음 (ISBN 978-89-7291-506-5).
- 2012: Turkish: Tüm Hastalıkların Şahı, Zeynep Arık Tozar (ISBN 978-6056260483).
- 2012: German: Der König aller Krankheiten, Barbara Schaden (ISBN 978-3832196448).
- 2012: Lithuanian: Visų ligų karalius: vėžio biografija, leidykla "Versus aureus" (ISBN 978-9955-34-352-3).
- 2012: Portuguese: O Imperador de Todos os Males. Uma biografia do cancro, Bertrand Editora (ISBN 9789722523943)
- 2012: Spanish: El emperador de todos los males: Una biografía del cáncer, Editorial Taurus (ISBN 6071112362)
- 2013: Chinese: 众病之王 : 癌症传, CITIC Press (ISBN 978-7508638119).
- 2013: French: L'empereur de toutes les maladies. Une biographie du cancer, Éditions Flammarion (ISBN 978-2081285446).
- 2013: Dutch: De keizer aller ziektes, een biografie van kanker, de Bezige Bij (ISBN 978-9023472896).
- 2013: Russian: Царь всех болезней. Биография рака, АСТ, ISBN 978-5-17-077569-9.
- 2013: Ukrainian: Імператор усіх хвороб: біографія раку, Київ, видавництво Жупанського (ISBN 978-966-2355-36-9).
- 2013: Polish: Cesarz wszech chorób: Biografia raka, Wydawnictwo Czarne (ISBN 978-83-7536-544-3)
- 2013: Bulgarian: Императорът на всички болести: Биография на рака, Изток - Запад (ISBN 978-619-152-315-3)
- 2013: Hungarian: Betegségek betegsége: mindent a rákról, Libri (ISBN 978-963-310-087-5)
- 2013: Arabic: إمبراطور الأمراض: سيرة ذاتية للسرطان, Tariq Olayan (ISBN 978-603-8086-27-8)
- 2013: Norwegian: Keiseren over alle sykdommer- kreftens biografi, Press (ISBN 9788275475105).
- 2013: Japanese: 病の皇帝「がん」に挑む ― 人類4000年の苦闘, Hayakawa Publishing (ISBN 4152093951)
- 2014: Swedish: Lidandets konung: Historien om cancer, Albert Bonniers Förlag (ISBN 9789100132699).
- 2014: Thai: จักรพรรดิแห่งโรคร้าย ชีวประวัติโรคมะเร็ง : The Emperor of All Maladies : A Biography of Cancer, สุนันทา วรรณสินธ์ เบล แปล, สำนักพิมพ์มติชน (ISBN 978-974-02-1085-6).
- 2015: Persian: "سرطان امپراطور بیماری‌ها", The House of Biology (ISBN 978-600-6926-36-0).
- 2015: Icelandic: Meistari allra meina: Ævisaga krabbameins, Forlagið (ISBN 978-9979-53-617-8).
- 2015: Czech: Vládkyně všech nemocí, Masarykova univerzita (ISBN 978-80-210-7761-4).
- 2017: Persian: «پادشاه همۀ امراض», Salekan (ISBN 978-964-5537-02-7).
- 2018: Vietnamese: Lịch sử ung thư : Hoàng đế của bách bệnh, Omega Plus / NXB Dân Trí (ISBN 978-6048863357).

== See also ==
- Cancer (2015 PBS film)
- History of cancer
- History of cancer chemotherapy
