= History of cancer =

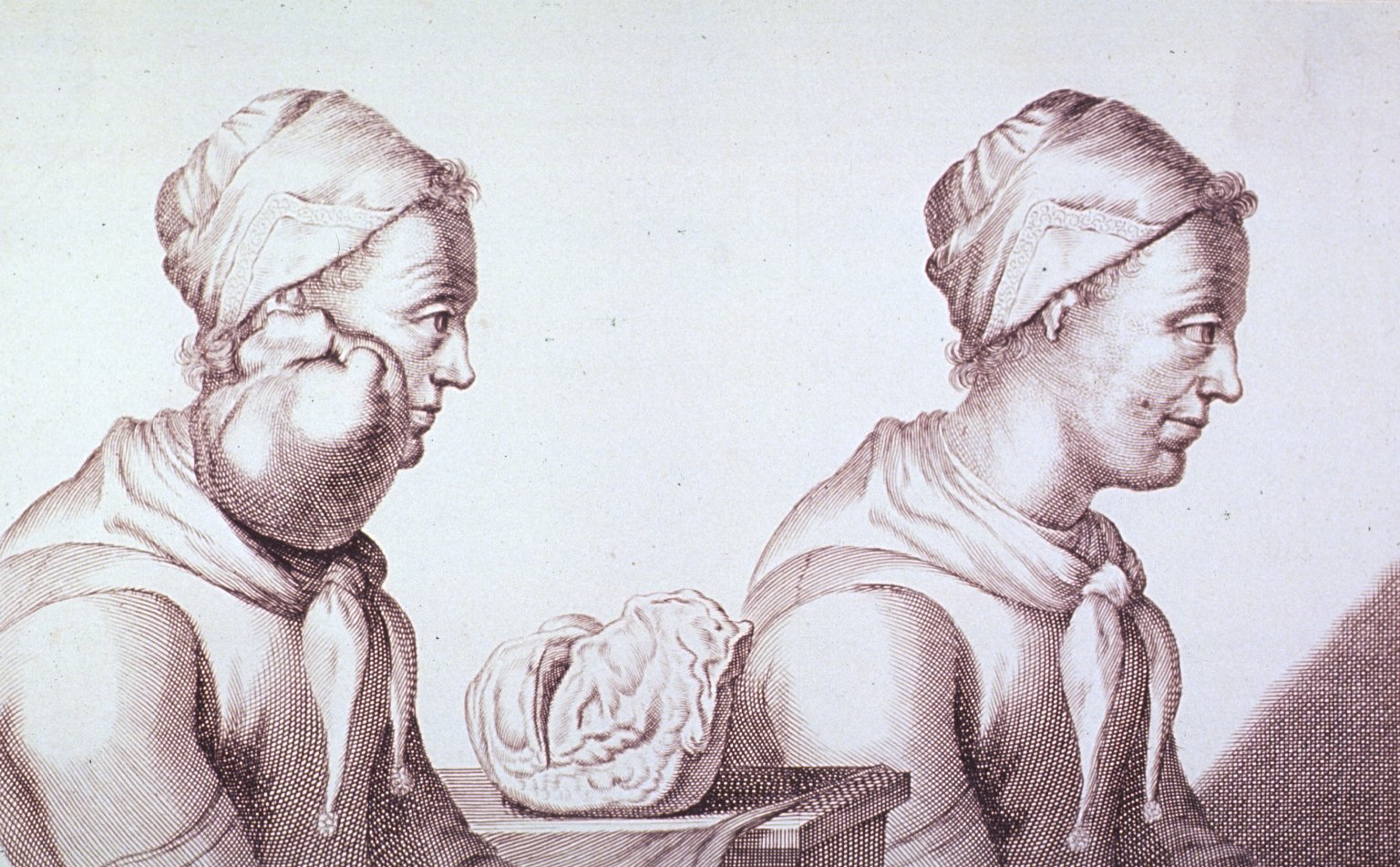
A tumor removed by surgery in 1689

The history of cancer describes the development of the field of oncology and its role in the history of medicine. It also covers its role in the history of public health, of hospitals, and social and cultural history.

== Early diagnosis ==
A 1.7 million year old osteosarcoma was reported in 2016 AD as the oldest documented malignant hominin cancer.

The earliest known descriptions of cancer appear in several papyri the from ancient Egypt. The Edwin Smith Papyrus was written around 1600 BC (possibly a fragmentary copy of a text from 2500 BC) and contains a description of cancer, as well as a procedure to remove breast tumours by cauterization, stating that the disease has no treatment.

Hippocrates (c. 460 BC – c. 370 BC) described several kinds of cancer, referring to them by the term καρκινος (carcinos), the Greek word for 'crab' or 'crayfish', as well as carcinoma. This comes from the appearance of the cut surface of a solid malignant tumour, with "the veins stretched on all sides as the animal the crab has its feet, whence it derives its name". Since it was against Greek tradition to open the body, Hippocrates only described and made drawings of outwardly visible tumours on the skin, nose, and breasts. Treatment was based on the humour theory of four bodily fluids (black and yellow bile, blood, and phlegm). According to the patient's humour, treatment consisted of diet, blood-letting, and/or laxatives. Celsus (c. 25 BC – 50 AD) translated carcinos into cancer, the Latin word for crab or crayfish.

In the 2nd century AD, the Greek physician Galen used oncos (Greek for 'swelling') to describe all tumours, reserving Hippocrates' term carcinos for malignant tumours. Galen also used the suffix -oma to indicate cancerous lesions. It is from Galen's usage that we derive the modern word oncology.

Through the centuries it was discovered that cancer could occur anywhere in the body, but Hippocrates' humour-theory-based treatment remained popular until the 19th century.

== 16th–19th century ==
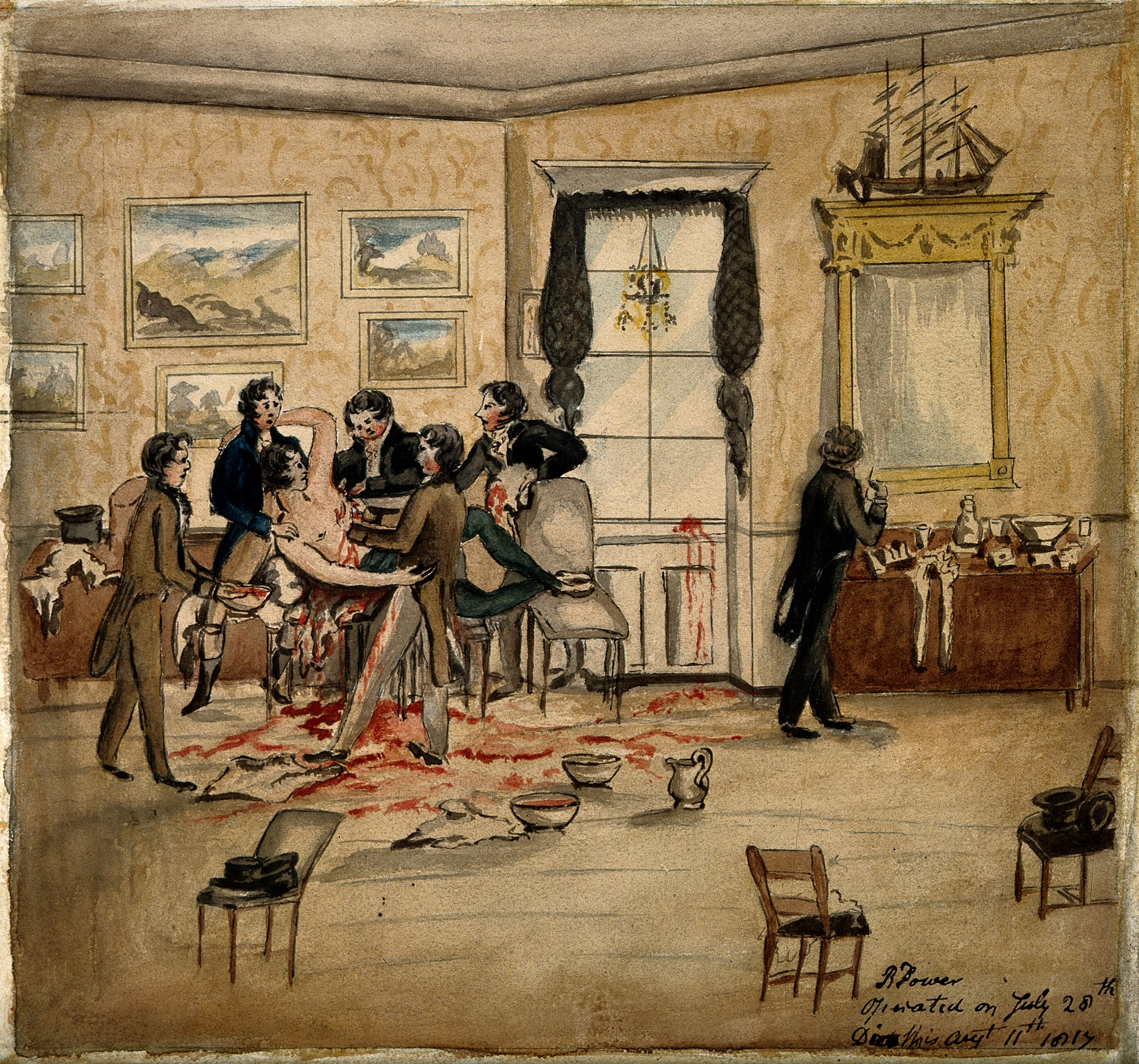
A surgical operation to remove a malignant tumor, 1817

In the 16th and 17th centuries, it became more acceptable for doctors to dissect bodies to discover the cause of death. The German professor Wilhelm Fabry believed that breast cancer was caused by a milk clot in a mammary duct. The Dutch professor Francois de la Boe Sylvius, a follower of Descartes, believed that all disease was the outcome of chemical processes, and that acidic lymph fluid was the cause of cancer. His contemporary Nicolaes Tulp believed that cancer was a poison that slowly spreads, and concluded that it was contagious. In the 1600s, cancer was vulgarly called "the wolf[e]".

The first cause of cancer was identified by British surgeon Percivall Pott, who discovered in 1775 that cancer of the scrotum was a common disease among chimney sweeps. The work of other individual physicians led to various insights, but when physicians started working together they could draw firmer conclusions.

With the widespread use of the microscope in the 18th century, it was discovered that the 'cancer poison' eventually spreads from the primary tumour through the lymph nodes to other sites ("metastasis"). This view of the disease was first formulated by the English surgeon Campbell De Morgan between 1871 and 1874. The use of surgery to treat cancer had poor results due to problems with hygiene. The renowned Scottish surgeon Alexander Monro saw only 2 breast tumour patients out of 60 surviving surgery for two years. In the 19th century, asepsis improved surgical hygiene and as the survival statistics went up, surgical removal of the tumour became the primary treatment for cancer. With the exception of William Coley who in the late 19th century felt that the rate of cure after surgery had been higher before asepsis (and who injected bacteria into tumours with mixed results), cancer treatment became dependent on the individual art of the surgeon at removing a tumour. The underlying cause of his results might be that infection stimulates the immune system to destroy left tumour cells. During the same period, the idea that the body was made up of various tissues, that in turn were made up of millions of cells, laid rest the ancient belief in humor theory on chemical imbalances in the body.

== Mechanism ==
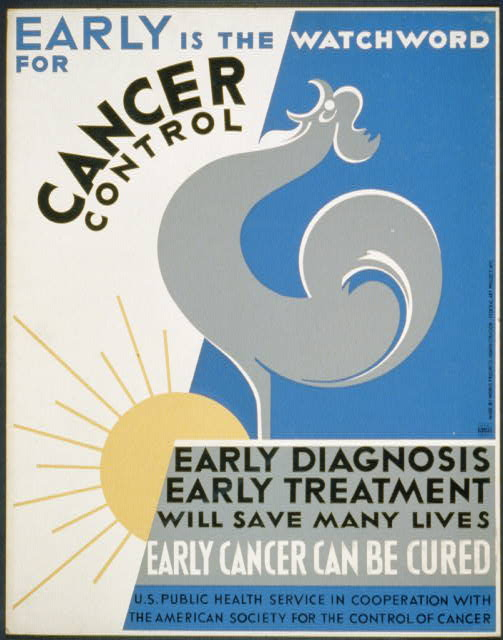
1938 American Society for the Control of Cancer poster

The genetic basis of cancer was recognised in 1902 by the German zoologist Theodor Boveri, professor of zoology at Munich and later in Würzburg. He discovered a method to generate cells with multiple copies of the centrosome, a structure he discovered and named. He postulated that chromosomes were distinct and transmitted different inheritance factors. He suggested that mutations of the chromosomes could generate a cell with unlimited growth potential which could be passed on to its descendants. He proposed the existence of cell cycle checkpoints, tumour suppressor genes and oncogenes. He speculated that cancers might be caused or promoted by radiation, physical or chemical injuries, or by pathogenic microorganisms.

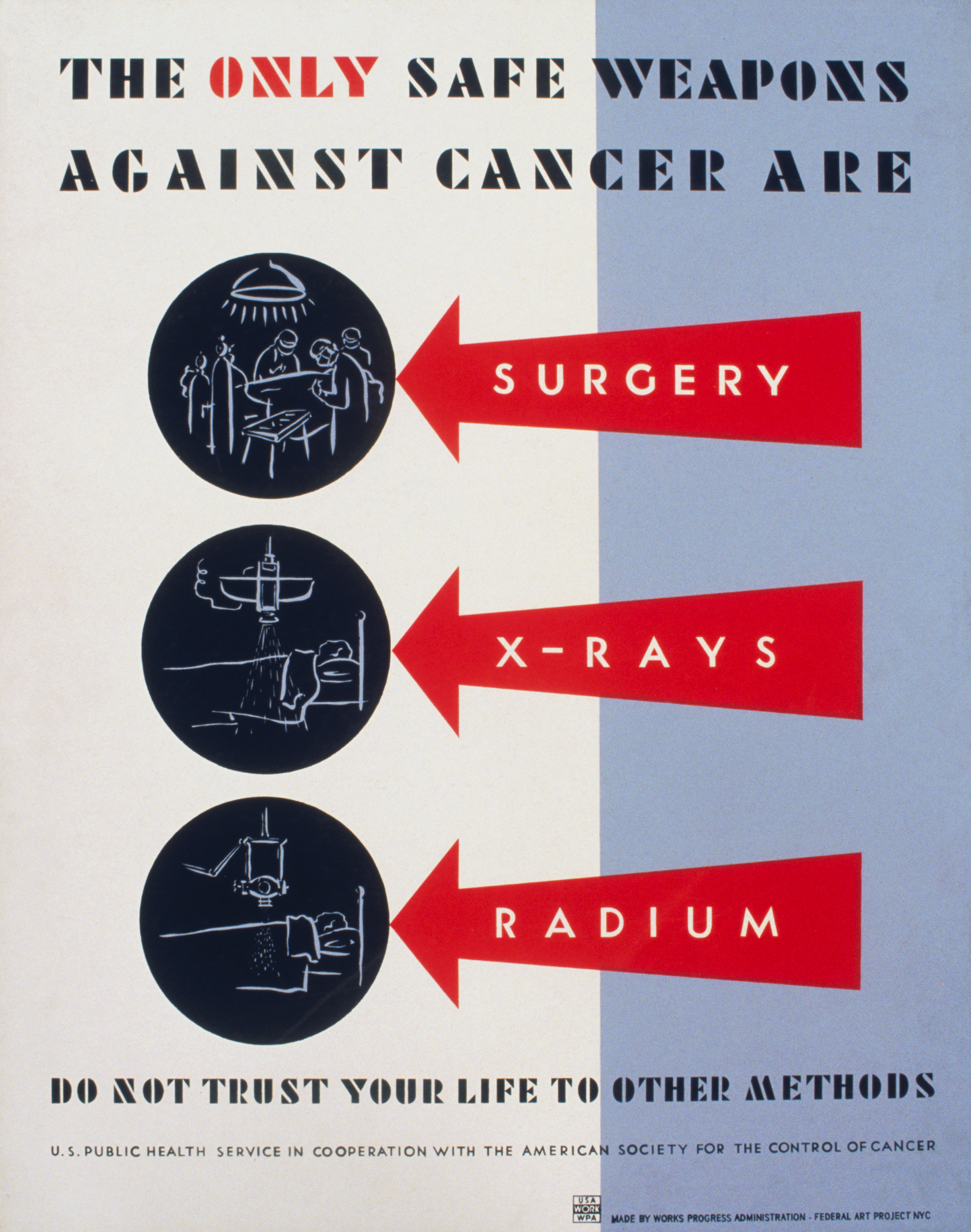
1938 poster identifying surgery, x-rays and radium as the proper treatments for cancer

== Therapies ==
When Marie Skłodowska-Curie and Pierre Curie discovered radiation at the end of the 19th century, they stumbled upon the first effective non-surgical cancer treatment. With radiation also came the first signs of multi-disciplinary approaches to cancer treatment. The surgeon was no longer operating in isolation but worked together with hospital radiologists to help patients. The complications in communication this brought, along with the necessity of the patient's treatment in a hospital facility rather than at home, also created a parallel process of compiling patient data into hospital files, which in turn led to the first statistical patient studies.

The American Cancer Society was founded in 1913 by 15 physicians and businessmen in New York City under the name American Society for the Control of Cancer (ASCC). The current name was adopted in 1945.

A founding paper of cancer epidemiology was the work of Janet Lane-Claypon, who published a comparative study in 1926 of 500 breast cancer cases and 500 control patients of the same background and lifestyle for the British Ministry of Health. Her groundbreaking work on cancer epidemiology was carried on by Richard Doll and Austin Bradford Hill, who published "Lung Cancer and Other Causes of Death In Relation to Smoking. A Second Report on the Mortality of British Doctors" followed in 1956 (otherwise known as the British doctors study). Richard Doll left the London Medical Research Centre (MRC), to start the Oxford unit for Cancer epidemiology in 1968. With the use of computers, the unit was the first to compile large amounts of cancer data. Modern epidemiological methods are closely linked to current concepts of disease and public health policy. Over the past 50 years, great efforts have been spent on gathering data across medical practice, hospital, provincial, state, and even country boundaries to study the interdependence of environmental and cultural factors on cancer incidence.

Cancer patient treatment and studies were restricted to individual physicians' practices until World War II when medical research centres discovered that there were large international differences in disease incidence. This insight drove national public health bodies to enable the compilation of health data across practices and hospitals, a process found in many countries today. The Japanese medical community observed that the bone marrow of victims of the atomic bombings of Hiroshima and Nagasaki was completely destroyed. They concluded that diseased bone marrow could also be destroyed with radiation, and this led to the development of bone marrow transplants for leukemia. Since World War II, trends in cancer treatment are to improve on a micro-level the existing treatment methods, standardize them, and globalize them to find cures through epidemiology and international partnerships.

In 1968 Michael A. Epstein, Bert Achong, and Yvonne Barr identified the first human cancer virus, called the Epstein–Barr virus.

== War on cancer ==
The "war" on cancer in the U.S. focused on the expansion of research on causes and cures. It began with the National Cancer Act of 1971 The act was intended "to amend the Public Health Service Act so as to strengthen the National Cancer Institute in order to more effectively carry out the national effort against cancer". It was signed into law by then President Richard Nixon on 23 December 1971.

In 1973, cancer research led to a Cold War incident, where co-operative samples of reported oncoviruses were discovered to be contaminated by HeLa.

In 1984, Harald zur Hausen discovered first HPV16 and then HPV18 responsible for approximately 70% of cervical cancers. For discovery that human papillomaviruses (HPV) cause human cancer, zur Hausen won a 2008 Nobel Prize.

From 1971 to 2007 the United States invested over $200 billion on cancer research; that total includes funding from public and private sectors and foundations.

Despite this substantial investment, the country saw just a five percent decrease in the cancer death rate (adjusting for size and age of the population) between 1950 and 2005. Longer life expectancy may be a contributing factor to this, as cancer rates and mortality rates increase significantly with age. More than three out of five cancers are diagnosed in people aged 65 and over.

== See also ==
- Cancer, a 2015 documentary film
