= Garraway =

Garraway may refer to:

- Agnes Blake (born Garraway; 1850-1860), first British woman MI6 agent
- Allan Garraway (1926–2014), British railway manager
- Annie Marie Watkins Garraway (born 1940), American mathematician
- Edward Garraway (1865–1932), Irish-born doctor and British colonial administrator
- Fitz Garraway (born 1947), Guyanese cricketer
- Henry Garraway (died 1646), English merchant and Lord Mayor of London
- Kate Garraway (born 1967), English television and radio presenter
- Ken Garraway, Canadian soccer player
- Levi Garraway (born 1968), American oncologist
- Patrick Garraway (1883–1945), Guyanese cricketer
- Sandra M. Garraway (born 20th century), Canadian-American neuroscientist
- Trevon Garraway (born 1984), Guyanese cricketer
- William Garraway (1617–1701), English MP
