= De Berardinis =

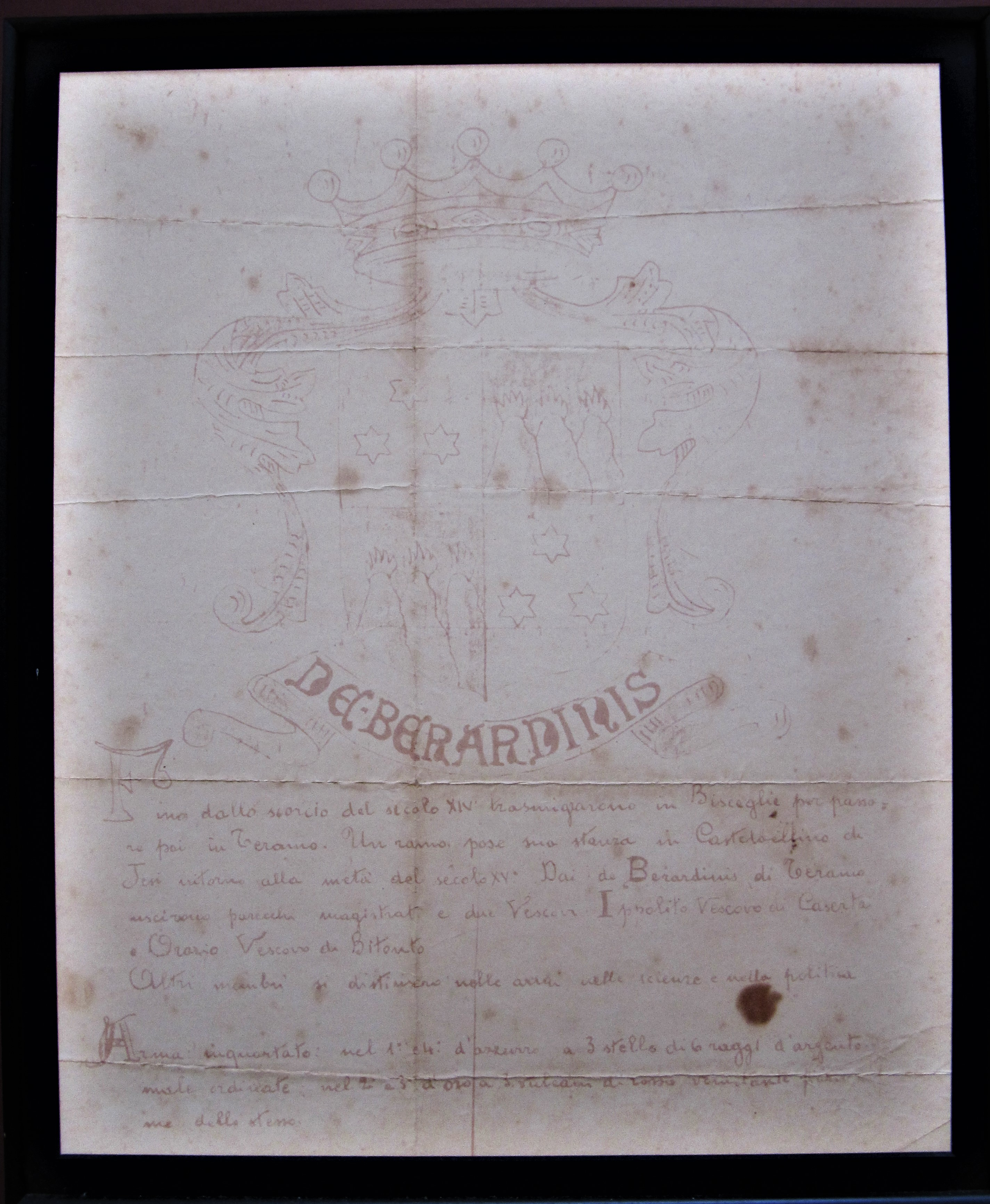
Illustration of De Berardinis family shield, date unknown

De Berardinis, de Berardinis or Di Berardinis is a surname of Italian origin.

Notable people with the name include:

- Leo de Berardinis (1940–2008), Italian stage actor and theatre director
- Michael Di Berardinis, American public official in Pennsylvania
- Olivia De Berardinis (b. 1948), American painter and illustrator
- Ralph DeBerardinis, American physician-scientist
- Rosetta DeBerardinis, American artist
- Willie Dennis, born William DeBerardinis, American jazz trombonist
