= Anindya Dutta =

Indian-born American biochemist and cancer researcher

- Education: Christian Medical College, Vellore (MBBS); Rockefeller University (PhD)
- Awards: Ranbaxy Award (SunPharma); Outstanding Investigator Award (ASIP); Distinguished Scientist Award (University of Virginia)
- Scientific career
- Fields: Biochemistry, cancer biology
- Workplaces: Brigham and Women's Hospital, Harvard Medical School, University of Virginia School of Medicine, University of Alabama

Anindya Dutta is an Indian-born American biochemist and cancer researcher, a Chair of the Department of Genetics at the University of Alabama at Birmingham School of Medicine since 2021, who has served as Chair of the Department of Biochemistry and Molecular Genetics at the University of Virginia School of Medicine in 2011–2021. Dutta's research has focused on the mammalian cell cycle with an emphasis on DNA replication and repair and on noncoding RNAs. He is particularly interested in how de-regulation of these processes promote cancer progression. For his accomplishments he has been elected a Fellow of the American Association for the Advancement of Science, received the Ranbaxy Award in Biomedical Sciences, the Outstanding Investigator Award from the American Society for Investigative Pathology, the Distinguished Scientist Award from the University of Virginia and the Mark Brothers Award from the Indiana University School of Medicine.

== Biography ==
Dutta was born in Kolkata, India. He attended St. Patrick's Higher Secondary School in Asansol (1966 to 1974) and obtained his MBBS degree from Christian Medical College & Hospital, Vellore, graduating as the Best Outgoing Student in 1982. After a year as a research assistant at the Indian Institute of Chemical Biology, Kolkata, he enrolled at Rockefeller University in New York City for doctoral studies with Hidesaburo Hanafusa to work on viral oncology. He obtained his Ph.D. in 1989.

He joined the laboratory of Bruce Stillman at Cold Spring Harbor Laboratory to do postdoctoral research on the cell-cycle regulation of DNA replication. In 1992 he began a residency in Anatomic Pathology at Brigham and Women's Hospital, Harvard Medical School, where he went on to become an assistant and then associate professor of pathology. In 2003, he was appointed the Harry F. Byrd Professor of Biochemistry and Molecular Genetics at the University of Virginia's School of Medicine. In 2021 he became Chair of the Department of Genetics at University of Alabama at Birmingham School of Medicine.

Dutta discovered how the cell cycle factor p21 interacts with and inhibits cyclin-dependent kinases and PCNA, identifying the cyclin-binding Cy or RXL motif that are also used by cdk to identify substrates for phosphorylation. He discovered how the interaction of p21, Cdt1, Set8 and other important cell-cycle regulators with PCNA triggers their ubiquitylation by CRL4-Cdt2 and subsequent proteasomal degradation. His laboratory cloned the cDNAs of many human DNA replication initiation factors and their regulators (Orc3, Orc4, Orc5, Orc6, Cdc6, Cdt1, Cdc45, Mcm10, geminin) and identified how the geminin-Cdt1 balance is important for the prevention of over-replication in human cells. These discoveries explained how a new experimental anti-cancer drug MLN4924 (Pevonedistat) caused over-replication of the DNA and DNA damage leading to cancer cell death. The lab discovered the E2 in the Fanconi Anemia pathway, UBE2T, that is now known to cause Fanconi Anemia (FANCT). In an early adoption of genomic technologies as part of the ENCODE pilot project, Dutta's lab molecularly identified domains of human chromosomes that replicated early or late in S phase and showed that they corresponded to chromosomal domains with active or repressive epigenetic marks respectively. He confirmed that most origins of replication in human cells appear to be zones with multiple initiation sites that are each used inefficiently in a given cell in a population of cells. The laboratory discovered tens of thousands of extrachromosomal circles of DNA (microDNA) in normal and cancerous cells and in tissues in humans, mice and chickens and somatically mosaic chromosomal microdeletions in some of the hotspots of microDNA production. The microDNA are released into the circulation and will add to the repertoire of cell-free-circulating DNA that is being used for liquid biopsy in cancers and in prenatal noninvasive genetic diagnoses. Finally, the lab has discovered how deletion of MCM9 and ASF1a genes in certain human cancers make the cancer cells susceptible to DNA damage-inducing therapy and that the USP46 deubiquitinase should be targeted for therapy of cancers caused by human papillomavirus.

In the area of noncoding RNAs, Dutta discovered the role of microRNAs like miR-206 and of long noncoding RNAs (lncRNAs) like H19 and MUNC in promoting skeletal muscle differentiation and regeneration after injury. The group has identified the roles of several microRNAs in tumorigenesis and scores of long noncoding RNAs whose expression levels predict the outcome of gliomas (e.g. DRAIC, LINC00152 or APTR) and has suggested that lncRNA expression patterns could be used for prognostic purposes. Dutta has identified a novel family of short RNAs derived from the processing of tRNAs, called tRFs. tRFs are emerging to be versatile regulators of cell function, with some of them regulating cellular gene expression by microRNA-like pathways even though they are not generated by enzymes that normally generate microRNAs

== Honors and awards ==
- National Merit Scholar, National Science Talent Scholar, India (1975)
- Best Outgoing Student, Christian Medical College, Vellore, India (1981)
- Postdoctoral Fellowship (1990), Junior Faculty Award (1993) and Research Scholar Award (2001), American Cancer Society
- Research Career Development Award, U.S. Army Breast Cancer Research Program (1994)
- Fellow, American Association for the Advancement of Science (2007)
- Ranbaxy Research Award in Basic Biomedical Science (2009)
- Harry F. Byrd Professor (2003-2018), Harrison Distinguished Professor (2018-), Millipub Award for papers with >1000 citations (2012), Team Science Award (2012), Distinguished Scientist Award (2015), University of Virginia
- Outstanding Investigator Award, American Society for Investigative Pathology (2015)
- Mark Brothers Award, Indiana University School of Medicine (2016)

== Professional activities ==
Over 75 trainees (postdoctoral fellows, Ph.D. and M.D. students and undergraduates) have passed through Dutta's laboratory, of whom over 30 currently hold independent positions doing research in academia or industry. As chair of the Department of Biochemistry and Molecular Genetics, he has hired nine faculty members and developed a research focus area in the department on epigenetics and genomics in cancer. Dutta has served as editor of the Journal of Biological Chemistry and as senior editor of Cancer Research. He has served as a reviewer for the National Institutes of Health, U.S. Armed Forces Cancer Research Program, Cancer Research UK, Wellcome Trust UK, CNRS/INSERM France, Austrian Science Fund, European Union's FP7 program, DBT-Wellcome Trust India Alliance, Institute for Basic Science (Korea) and on the external review committee for Oklahoma Medical Research Foundation and for Thomas Jefferson University. Dutta has been elected to organize two Gordon Research Conferences on Cell proliferation and on Genome stability and organized three Cold Spring Harbor Laboratory meetings on Eukaryotic DNA replication and Genome Maintenance. He has served on the Program Committees for annual meetings of the American Society for Investigative Pathology and of the American Society for Biochemistry and Molecular Biology.
