= John Diffley =

John Diffley may refer to:

- John Diffley (soccer) (born 1967), American soccer player and athletic director
- John Diffley (biologist) (born 1958), molecular biologist
