= Paul Marks Prize for Cancer Research =

Prize for significant contributions to cancer research

The Paul Marks Prize for Cancer Research is awarded by the Memorial Sloan Kettering Cancer Center to recognize cancer researchers who are making significant contributions to the understanding of cancer or are improving the treatment of the disease through basic or clinical research.

The prize is awarded biennially to up to three recipients aged 45 or younger, who are selected by a panel of investigators from leading research institutions. Each presents his or her work at a scientific symposium at Memorial Sloan Kettering Cancer Center, receives a medal and shares a cash award of $150,000. The prize is named after Paul A. Marks, President Emeritus of the Memorial Sloan Kettering Cancer Center.

== Prizewinners ==
Source: Memorial Sloan Kettering Cancer Center

- 2025 Omar Abdel-Wahab, Christina Curtis, Andrea Ablasser
- 2023 Mark Agnel Frederick Dawson, Cigall Kadoch, and Michelle Monje
- 2021 Ralph J. DeBerardinis, Sun Hur, Charles Swanton
- 2019 Nathanael Gray, Joshua Mendell, Christopher Vakoc
- 2017 Gad Getz, Chuan He, Aviv Regev
- 2015 Bradley Bernstein, Howard Y. Chang, and Daniel Durocher
- 2013 Simon J. Boulton, Levi A. Garraway, and Duojia Pan
- 2011 Scott A. Armstrong, Kornelia Polyak, and Victor E. Velculescu
- 2009 Arul Chinnaiyan, Matthew Meyerson, and David M. Sabatini
- 2007 Angelika Amon, Todd R. Golub, and Gregory J. Hannon
- 2005 Tyler Jacks, Scott Lowe, and Jeff Wrana
- 2003 Yuan Chang, John F. X. Diffley, and Nikola Pavletich
- 2001 Titia de Lange, Stephen J. Elledge, William G. Kaelin Jr., and Xiaodong Wang

== See also ==
- List of medicine awards
- List of prizes named after people
