= Tak Wah Mak =

Canadian biochemist

- Born: 麦德华, Mài Déhuá; October 4, 1946 (age 79); Guangzhou, China
- Education: Wah Yan College, Kowloon; University of Wisconsin; University of Alberta
- Known for: Discovery of the T-cell receptor Discovery of the function of CTLA-4 Founder of Agios Pharmaceuticals
- Scientific career
- Fields: Biochemistry; Immunology; Biology
- Workplaces: Princess Margaret Cancer Centre; University Health Network; University of Toronto
- Academic advisors: Howard Martin Temin; Ernest McCulloch; James Till

Tak Wah Mak, OC OOnt FRS FRSC (simplified Chinese: 麦德华; traditional Chinese: 麥德華; pinyin: Mài Déhuá; born October 4, 1946, in China) is a Canadian medical researcher, geneticist, oncologist, and biochemist at the University of Toronto Temerty Faculty of Medicine. He first became widely known for his discovery of the T-cell receptor in 1983 and pioneering work in the genetics of immunology. In 1995, Mak published a landmark paper on the discovery of the function of the immune checkpoint protein CTLA-4, thus opening the path for immunotherapy/checkpoint inhibitors as a means of cancer treatment. Mak is also the founder of Agios Pharmaceuticals, whose lead compound, IDHIFA®, was approved by the FDA for acute myeloid leukemia in August 2017, becoming the first drug specifically targeting cancer metabolism to be used for cancer treatment. He has worked in a variety of areas including biochemistry, immunology, and cancer genetics.

== Early life ==
Born in southern China in 1946 to parents who were silk merchants, and raised in Hong Kong, Tak Wah Mak's parents encouraged him to become a doctor, but his interests lay elsewhere—in math, biology, and chemistry. Mak and his family moved to the United States of America during the mid-1960s and with the choice of going to the University of California or Wisconsin, he was persuaded by his mother to attend Wisconsin to avoid the antiwar activities at California. His interest in life and chemistry led him to eventually studying biochemistry and biophysics at the University of Wisconsin.

== University life ==
At the University of Wisconsin, Mak met virologist Roland Rueckert. Mak initially went to his lab to inquire about a job posting from Rueckert's lab looking for someone to wash test tubes. After his first day on the job, Mak asked if more cleaning work was available, in which Rueckert said there was not, however there was experimental research work available. That, as Mak would later state, would be the beginning of his scientific career. After finishing his degree at Wisconsin, Mak moved to Canada to begin his doctoral studies at the University of Alberta, Edmonton. In the early 1970s, he earned his PhD in biochemistry from the University of Alberta. After he obtained his degree, Mak moved to Toronto and became a Canadian citizen. In Toronto, he worked with Ernest McCulloch and James Till, who discovered haematopoietic stem cells.

== Scientific career ==
In 1980, Mak returned to Wisconsin to learn new techniques in the lab of Howard Martin Temin, who won the Nobel Prize in Physiology or Medicine in 1975 for his discovery of the enzyme reverse transcriptase. Temin would be one of his mentors that shaped his way of thinking, encouraging him to delve into diverse disciplines. During the early 1980s in Toronto, with his newly setup group, Mak was working on virology. Mak employed a technique called molecular subtraction, used by virologists, to attempt to identify the T-cell receptor, which was so elusive at the time it was referred to as the "Holy Grail of Immunology." In 1984, Mak discovered the T-cell receptor, with Mark M. Davis identifying the receptor in mouse. This work on the cloning of T-cell receptor genes, as of 2005, has been cited nearly 1200 times. In spite of offers from prestigious institutions around the world, Mak remained committed to Canada's scientific community.

In 1993, Mak received support from the world's largest independent biotech company, Amgen, to establish the Amgen Research Institute in Toronto. Financial support from Amgen resulted in his lab pioneering the use of knockout mice, and as a result his lab generated one of the first knockout mice and has generated more knockout mice than any other lab in the world. Mak's role in advancing the use of genetically altered mice in scientific study has led to important breakthroughs in immunology and understanding cancer at the cellular level. As of 2005, Amgen-produced papers have been cited more than 40,000 times. The basic research in cancer conducted by Mak has been published in top international scientific journals and he has given several keynote addresses at cancer symposia across Canada and the United States. By 1995, Mak had reached a high point in his career, when he and his team published their seminal findings on the function of CTLA-4, thus paving the road for Immunotherapy and Checkpoint inhibition as potential anti-cancer therapies.

In 2004 Mak became the director of the Advanced Medical Discovery Institute and the Campbell Family Institute for Breast Cancer Research. He is also the senior scientist, division of Stem Cell and Developmental Biology, Advanced Medical Discovery Institute/Ontario Cancer Institute. He is a member of the Cancer Research Institute Scientific Advisory Council. Since 1984, he has been a Professor in the Departments of Medical Biophysics and Immunology at the University of Toronto.

From the early 2000s, Mak concentrated his efforts on the emerging field of cancer metabolism. Mak, Lewis C. Cantley, and Craig B. Thompson together founded Agios Pharmaceuticals, a biotech pharmaceutical company whose sole purpose is to discover methods of targeting cancer metabolism. The trio have contributed immensely in a few years to what was originally a forgotten paradigm. The discovery of the involvement of particular enzymes such as PKM2, mutated IDH as well as novel oncometabolites such as 2-hydroxyglutarate in cancer development have once again brought cancer metabolism back to the forefront of cancer biology. On 1 August 2017 Agios announced that the FDA had approved their lead compound, IDHIFA®, for the treatment of acute myeloid leukemia. IDHIFA® targets a mutant form of Isocitrate dehydrogenase 2 and is the first drug specifically targeting cancer metabolism to be used for cancer treatment.

Mak holds Honorary Doctoral Degrees from numerous universities in North America and Europe. He is an Officer of the Order of Canada and has been elected a Foreign Associate of the National Academy of Sciences (USA) as well as a Fellow of the Royal Society of London (UK.) He has won international recognition in the forms of the Emil von Behring Prize, the King Faisal Prize for Medicine, the Gairdner Foundation International Award, the Sloan Prize of the General Motors Cancer Foundation, the Paul Ehrlich and Ludwig Darmstaedter Prize, the Novartis Prize in Immunology, and the Szent-Györgyi Prize for Progress in Cancer Research.

== Honors ==
- 1985, awarded the Steacie Prize
- 1986, elected a Fellow of the Royal Society of Canada
- 1988, awarded the Emil von Behring Prize
- 1989, awarded the Gairdner Foundation International Award
- 1990, awarded the Royal Society of Canada's McLaughlin Medal
- 1994, made a Fellow of the Royal Society
- 1995, awarded the King Faisal Prize for Medicine
- 1996, awarded the Robert L. Noble Prize by the National Cancer Institute of Canada
- 1996, awarded the Sloan Prize of the General Motors Cancer Foundation
- 2000, made an Officer of the Order of Canada
- 2002, elected as a foreign associate to the National Academy of Sciences in the discipline of immunology
- 2003, awarded the Killam Prize by the Canada Council for the Arts.
- 2004, awarded the Paul Ehrlich and Ludwig Darmstaedter Prize
- 2005, elected as an International Honorary Member of the American Academy of Arts and Sciences.
- 2007, awarded the Order of Ontario.
- 2009, introduced to the Canadian Medical Hall of Fame.
- 2015, award the Top 25 Canadian Immigrant Awards.
- 2021, awarded the Szent-Györgyi Prize for Progress in Cancer Research
- 2023 awarded the Pezcoller Foundation-AACR International Award for Extraordinary Achievement in Cancer Research.

== Select publications ==
Year	Title	Publication	Author(s)	Volume/Issue Citation
2015	Signalling thresholds and negative B-cell selection in acute lymphoblastic leukaemia	Nature	Chen Z, Shojaee S, Buchner M, Geng H, Lee JW, Klemm L, Titz B, Graeber TG, Park E, Tan YX, Satterthwaite A, Paietta E, Hunger SP, Willman CL, Melnick A, Loh ML, Jung JU, Coligan JE, Bolland S, Mak TW, Limnander A, Jumaa H, Reth M, Weiss A, Lowell CA, Müschen M.	10.1038/nature14231
1999	Glypican-3–Deficient Mice Exhibit Developmental Overgrowth and Some of the Abnormalities Typical of Simpson-Golabi-Behmel Syndrome	The Journal of Cell Biology	Cano-Gauci, D. F.; Song, H. H.; Yang, H.; McKerlie, C.; Choo, B.; Shi, W.; Pullano, R.; Piscione, T. D.; Grisaru, S.; Soon, S.; Sedlackova, L.; Tanswell, A. K.; Mak, T. W.; Yeger, H.; Lockwood, G. A.; Rosenblum, N. D.; Filmus, J.	10.1083/jcb.146.1.255
1984	A human T cell-specific cDNA clone encodes a protein having extensive homology to immunoglobulin chains	Nature	Yanagi, Y.; Yoshikai, Y.; Leggett, K.; Clark, S. P.; Aleksander, I.; Mak, T. W.	10.1038/308145a0
1984	Presence of T-cell receptor mRNA in functionally distinct T cells and elevation during intrathymic differentiation	Nature	Yoshikai Y, Yanagi Y, Suciu-Foca N, Mak TW	10.1038/310506a0
1984	Rearrangements of T-cell receptor gene YT35 in human DNA from thymic leukaemia T-cell lines and functional T-cell clones	Nature	Toyonaga B, Yanagi Y, Suciu-Foca N, Minden M, Mak TW	10.1038/311385a0
