= Vakoc =

Vakoc or Vakoč is a surname. Notable people with the surname include:

- Christopher Vakoc, American molecular biologist
- Petr Vakoč (born 1992), Czech cyclist
- Tim Vakoc (1960–2009), American priest
