= Agios Pharmaceuticals =

Public American pharmaceutical company

Agios Pharmaceutical Inc.
- Type: Public
- Traded as: Nasdaq: AGIO; Russell 1000 Component
- Industry: Pharmaceuticals
- Founded: 2008; 18 years ago
- Headquarters: Cambridge, Massachusetts, United States
- Key people: Brian Goff (CEO)
- Revenue: ▲$118 Million(2019) ▲US$ 54.0 million (2025)
- Net income: ▼US$ 412.8 million (2025)
- Total assets: ▼US$ 1.30 billion (2025)
- Total equity: ▼US$ 1.19 billion (2025)
- Number of employees: 536
- Website: agios.com

Agios Pharmaceuticals Inc. is a publicly trading American pharmaceutical company pioneering therapies for genetically defined diseases, with a near-term focus on developing therapies for hemolytic anemias. The company was founded in 2008 (or 2007) by Lewis Cantley, Tak Mak and Craig Thompson. Agios is a Delaware corporation headquartered in Cambridge, Massachusetts. The company tendered an initial public offering in July 2013.

== History ==
In 2012, Agios was named among the defendants in a lawsuit against one of its founders, Craig Thompson, alleging that Thompson used research illegally taken from the Abramson Family Cancer Research Institute in research at Agios.

In May 2016, the company announced it would launch partnership with Celgene, developing metabolic immuno-oncology therapies and licensing AG-221 as well as AG-881 to Celgene, potentially garnering Agios $120 million in drug licensing payments.

In April 2017, the company raised $250 million in a new stock offering in anticipation of approval for its first cancer drug, enasidenib, by the US Food and Drug Administration.

In December 2017, the company filed a New Drug Application with the US FDA for ivosidenib for the treatment of adult patients with relapsed or refractory acute myeloid leukemia with an IDH1 mutation.

In November 2019, Agios announced an underwritten public offering of 8,250,000 shares of common stock at a price of $31.00 per share which would result in approximately $256 million aggregate gross proceeds.

In April 2022, the FDA approved mitapivat as first disease-modifying therapy for hemolytic anemia in adults with pyruvate kinase deficiency.

== Corporate governance ==
As of August 2022, Agios' CEO is Brian Goff.

Agios was established as a private company and converted to a public company with its initial public offering in July 2013 and subsequent listing on NASDAQ.
