= John Diffley (biologist) =

American biochemist

John Diffley FRS FMedSci
- Born: John Francis Xavier Diffley; 4 March 1958 (age 68)
- Education: New York University
- Awards: Paul Marks Prize for Cancer Research (2003); Fellow of the Royal Society (2005); Louis-Jeantet Prize for Medicine (2016); Canada Gairdner International Award (2019); Member of the National Academy of Sciences (2020)
- Scientific career
- Fields: Chromatin replication, cell cycle, DNA damage checkpoints
- Workplaces: Francis Crick Institute; Cold Spring Harbor Laboratory

John Francis Xavier Diffley (born 4 March 1958) is an American biochemist and Associate Research Director at the Francis Crick Institute. He is known for his contributions to the understanding of how DNA replication is initiated, and how it is subsequently regulated throughout the cell cycle and in response to DNA damage.

== Research and career ==
Diffley was educated at New York University, obtaining his Ph.D. in 1985. He then worked as a postdoctoral researcher with Bruce Stillman at Cold Spring Harbor Laboratory. In 1990, he established his own research group at the Clare Hall Laboratories, Cancer Research UK, which is now part of the Francis Crick Institute. His group studies the mechanism and regulation of eukaryotic DNA replication.

== Awards and honours ==
In 1998, Diffley was elected a member of European Molecular Biology Organisation (EMBO). He is also an elected member of Academia Europaea (2009) and the European Academy of Cancer Sciences (2011). He was elected a Fellow of the Royal Society (FRS) in 2005, Fellow of the American Association for the Advancement of Science (AAAS) in 2007, and Fellow of the Academy of Medical Sciences (FMedSci) in 2011.

He is a recipient of the Paul Marks Prize for Cancer Research (2003), the Louis-Jeantet Prize for Medicine(2016) and the Canada Gairdner International Award (2019). He was elected to the National Academy of Sciences in 2020.
