= Hidesaburo Hanafusa =

Japanese virologist (1929–2009)

- 花房 秀三郎
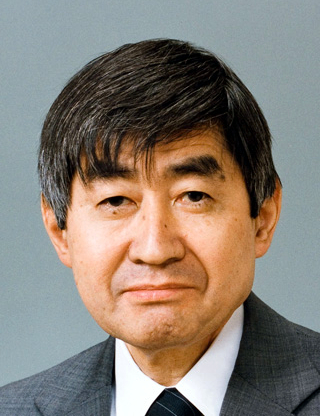
- Born: December 1, 1929; Hyogo Prefecture
- Died: March 15, 2009 (aged 79); Osaka Prefecture
- Education: Osaka University (PhD)
- Known for: Discovery of oncogenes
- Spouse: Teruko
- Children: 1 (Kei Hanafusa)
- Awards: Lasker Award (1982); Order of Culture (1995)
- Scientific career
- Fields: Oncology; Virology
- Workplaces: Rockefeller University; Osaka Bioscience Institute
- Doctoral students: Anindya Dutta; Sally Kornbluth

Hidesaburo Hanafusa (花房 秀三郎, Hanafusa Hidesaburō; December 1, 1929 – March 15, 2009) was a Japanese virologist. He shared the 1982 Albert Lasker Award for Basic Medical Research with Harold E. Varmus and J. Michael Bishop for demonstrating how RNA tumor viruses cause cancer, and elucidating their role in combining, rescuing and maintaining oncogenes in the viral genome.

== Life ==
Hidesaburo Hanafusa was born on December 1, 1929, in Hyogo Prefecture. He received his Ph.D. in biochemistry in 1960 from Osaka University, where he also met his future wife, Teruko. After his research at the University of California, Berkeley, and in France, he was appointed as professor of molecular oncology at the Rockefeller University in 1973, and returned to Japan in 1998, becoming director at the Osaka Bioscience Institute. He was a foreign associate of the US National Academy of Sciences and a member of the Japan Academy.

He died on March 15, 2009, of liver cancer, at the age of 79.

== Awards ==
- 1982: Albert Lasker Award for Basic Medical Research
- 1983: Asahi Prize
- 1986: G.H. Clowes Memorial award, American Association for Cancer Research
- 1993: Alfred P. Sloan, Jr. Prize
- 1995: Order of Culture
- 2000: Doctorate of Science, honoris causa, Rockefeller University

== See also ==
- List of members of the National Academy of Sciences (Medical genetics, hematology, and oncology)
