= Foundation Medicine =

American genomics company

Foundation Medicine, Inc.

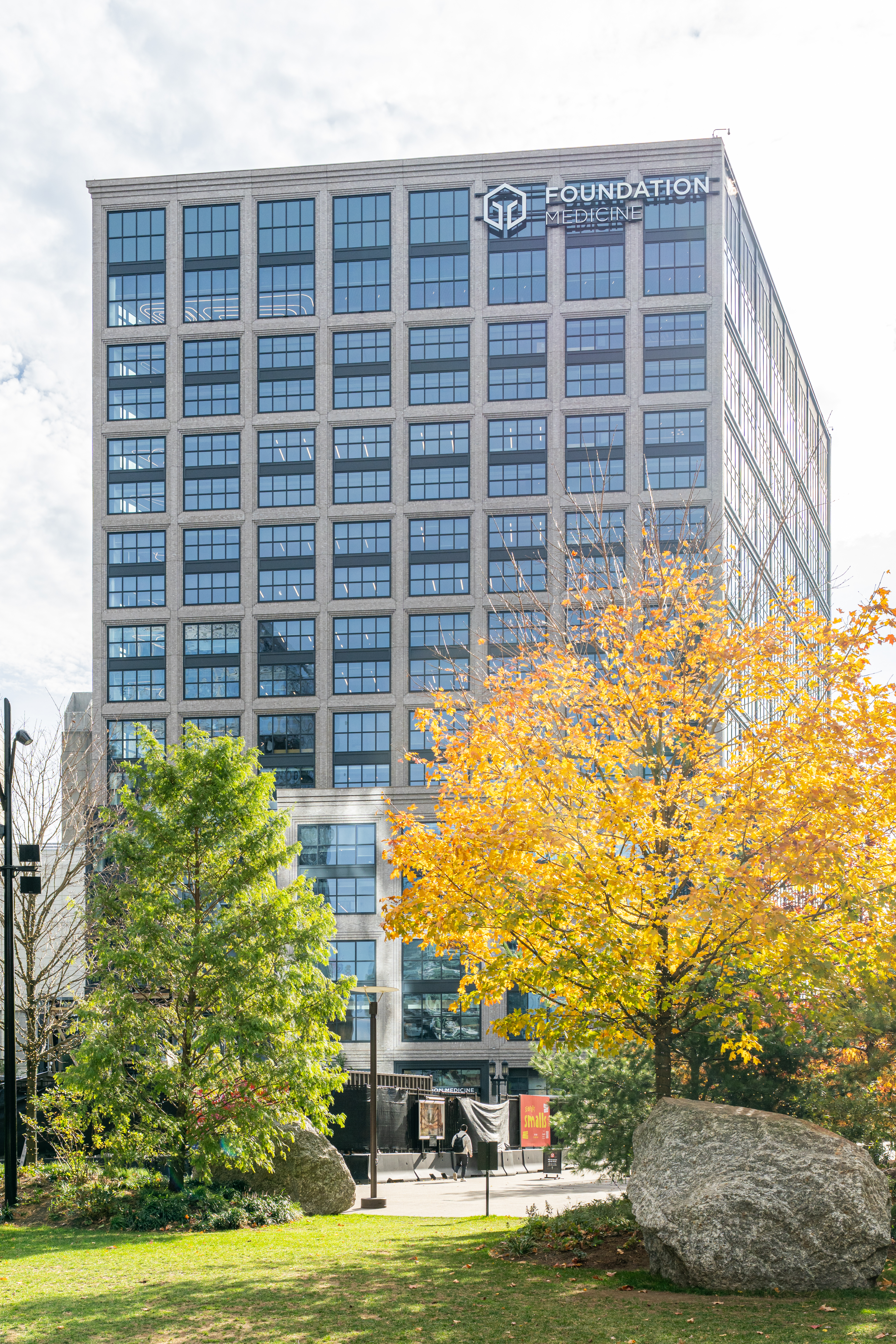
- Headquarters in Seaport District, to be shared with Hasbro in 2027.
- Type: Subsidiary
- Traded as: Nasdaq: FMI
- Headquarters: Boston, Massachusetts, United States
- Key people: Daniel Malarek (CEO)
- Products: FoundationOne CDx FoundationOne Liquid FoundationOne Heme Foundation Insights FoundationSmartTrials
- Revenue: ▲$152.9 million (2017)
- Parent: Roche
- Website: foundationmedicine.com

Foundation Medicine, Inc. is an American company based in Boston, Massachusetts, which develops, manufactures, and sells genomic profiling assays based on next-generation sequencing technology for solid tumors, hematologic malignancies, and sarcomas.

== History ==
Foundation Medicine was founded in Cambridge, Massachusetts. The company was conceived after Broad Institute researchers Levi Garraway and Matthew Meyerson published a 2007 paper detailing a method for large-panel testing of 238 DNA mutations.

Foundation Medicine launched in 2010 with a $25 million Series A financing led by Third Rock Ventures. The company released its first commercial assay, or test, called FoundationOne in 2012. The company also began partnering with pharmaceutical companies to analyze patient samples. The first such program was piloted with Novartis in 2011, and by 2018, the company had more than 30 partnerships.

Foundation Medicine launched its second test, a hematological biomarker assay called FoundationOneHeme, in 2013. The company held its initial public offering in August 2013. The following year, Priority Health in Michigan became the first healthcare plan in the United States to cover the company's tests.

In 2016, using FoundationCore data, Foundation Medicine released anonymized records detailing genomic data on cancers from 18,000 adult patients to the National Cancer Institute's (NCI) Genomic Data Commons (GDC) portal.

In 2018, Roche acquired Foundation Medicine (via acquisition of the remaining 42.5% of Foundation Medicine for $2.4 billion), and currently operates it as a subsidiary.

Guardant Health sued Foundation Medicine over patents in 2019–2020. In 2021, Guardant Health licensed intellectual property to Foundation Medicine for $25 million in a settlement.

In 2024, Foundation Medicine moved its headquarters from Cambridge to a newly built tower in Boston’s Seaport District, consolidating their Massachusetts employees from four locations into one location.

== Products ==
Foundation Medicine's products include genomic tests for solid tumors and blood-based cancers and sarcomas, as well as data services.

- FoundationOne CDx is a CGP test providing information for five tumor types: ovarian, lung, breast, colorectal, and melanoma.
- FoundationOne Liquid.
- FoundationOne Heme.
- The company's FoundationCore database contains more than 300,000 genomic profiles sourced from the results of the company's assays as well as information on over 150 subtypes of cancer.
