= Levi Watkins =

American heart surgeon and civil rights activist

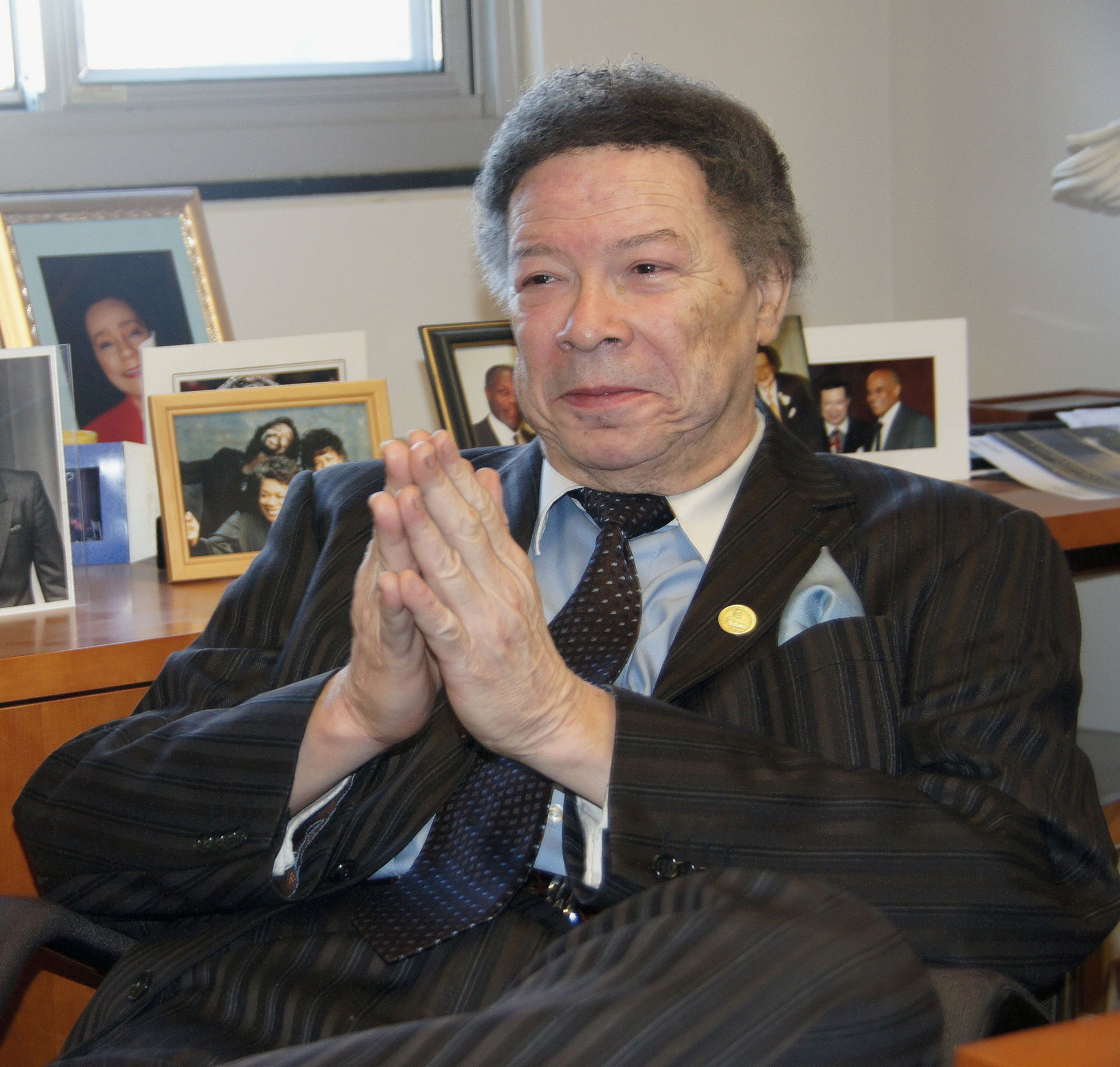
- Watkins in 2013
- Born: June 13, 1944; Parsons, Kansas, U.S.
- Died: April 11, 2015 (aged 70); Baltimore, Maryland, U.S.
- Education: Tennessee State University; Vanderbilt University Medical School
- Occupations: Heart surgeon, civil rights activist
- Parents: Levi Watkins, Sr. (father); Lillian Varnado (mother)
- Relatives: Annie Marie Watkins Garraway (sister); Levi Garraway (nephew)

Levi Watkins Jr. (June 13, 1944 – April 11, 2015) was an American heart surgeon and civil rights activist. On February 4, 1980, he and Vivien Thomas were the first to successfully implant an automatic defibrillator in a human patient at Johns Hopkins University. This took place only a mere seven months after Watkins completed his surgical education at Johns Hopkins. Today, millions of patients everywhere use this device, which detects irregular heart beats and corrects them.

Watkins was known to be a determined, passionate, and caring individual. He used this compassion to fuel his movement for minorities within the medical field. Today, people still use his wisdom and ideas based on civil rights activism to make medical schools more representative of the diversity of the human race. Vanderbilt University even has a lecture series held annually in his honor, in order to discuss the importance of inclusivity within the university.

== Early life and education ==
Watkins was born in Parsons, Kansas to Levi Watkins Sr. (1911–1994) and Lillian Varnado (1917–2013). He grew up with five siblings: two brothers, James Watkins and Donald V. Watkins Sr., and three sisters, Doristine L. Minott, Emma Pearl McDonald and Annie Marie Garraway. The family moved to Montgomery, Alabama, where his father served as the sixth president of Alabama State College from 1962 to 1983 and his mother worked as a high school teacher. As a child, Watkins was baptized by Ralph Abernathy in Birmingham, Alabama. Reverend Abernathy served as a leader in civil rights and worked diligently with Martin Luther King Jr. Watkins was the valedictorian of his class at Alabama State Laboratory High School.

He was motivated to seek a career in the medical field by a Biology professor at Tennessee State University. Watkins graduated from Tennessee State University with a degree in biology. Afterward, he attended the Vanderbilt University School of Medicine and became the first African American to obtain a medical degree from that institution. He learned of his acceptance through a newspaper article about him in Nashville. By the time he graduated in 1970, Watkins was still the only black student at the school. He was a member of Alpha Omega Alpha, Alpha Phi Alpha, Alpha Kappa Mu, and Beta Kappa Chi.

== Medical career ==
Watkins began his medical residency at Johns Hopkins Hospital in 1971. There, he became chief resident of cardiac surgery, acting as the first African American chief resident at the university. Two years after his research on angiotensin blockers at Harvard, Watkins returned to Johns Hopkins and joined the admissions department in 1979. In 1980, he began his work on the defibrillator, which he improved upon during his time at Johns Hopkins. Watkins also used this time to enhance techniques for open heart surgery, many of which are still used today. He was named a professor of cardiac surgery in 1991, and concurrently held the post of Associate Dean of the School of Medicine until his retirement in 2013.

In 1993, his father, Levi Watkins Sr., had a stroke and required vascular surgery. His siblings requested that Watkins perform the surgery, as they knew he was an exceptional cardiac surgeon. He prayed before the surgery. The surgery was successful.

== Work on angiotensin blockers ==
Watkins left Johns Hopkins in 1973 for Harvard University where he researched the use of angiotensin blockers in cases of congestive heart failure until 1975. Angiotensin blockers were created in order to avoid the side effects of ACE inhibitors, which were previously the drug of choice for lowering blood pressure and treating congestive heart failure. The research work that Watkins completed during those two years at Harvard contributed to the safety and efficiency of the drug. His research clearly paid off, as this drug is still used today in patients that cannot tolerate ACE inhibitors to treat their congestive heart failure.

== Civil rights activism ==
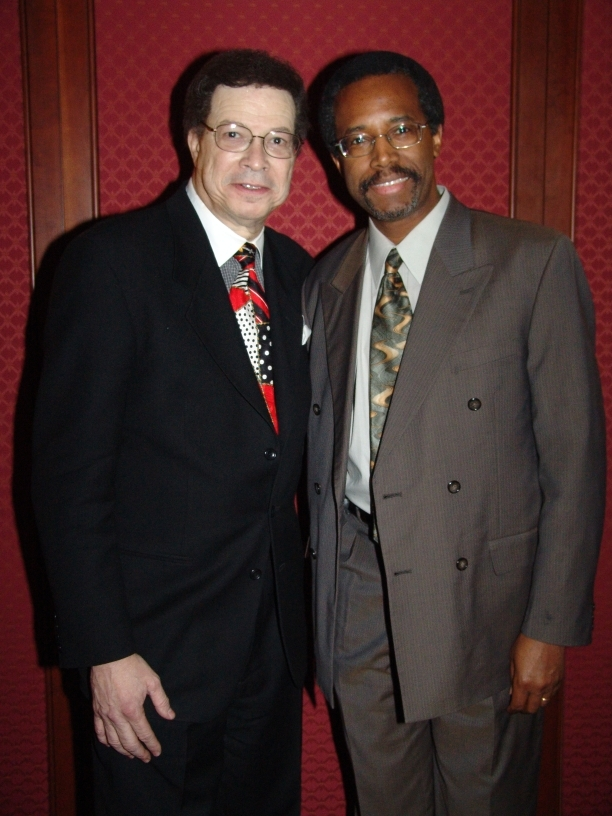
Watkins with fellow surgeon Ben Carson in 2000

As a young boy, Watkins and his family met Martin Luther King's family through their church. Watkins was eight years old when he met King, who served as the family's pastor. From that point on, he became invested in the civil rights movement, and spent the rest of his life fighting for other fellow African Americans and other minorities who were struggling in their advance in the medical field. In 1955, when Watkins was only 11 years old, he took part in the Montgomery bus boycott that took place after the bus incident with Rosa Parks. He also worked closely with King, serving as a volunteer driver for the civil rights leader. Later in his life, he was selected to serve on the admissions board at Johns Hopkins University where he spent his last years making the school more fair to all ethnicities, especially minorities. He improved conditions at the school so much that between the years of 1978 and 1983, the school's population of African American students increased 5-fold.

Watkins acted as an adviser to several important African American figures, such as James E. K. Hildreth and Selwyn M. Vickers. Hildreth was the dean of the College of Biological Sciences at UC Davis and is also an immunologist who spent much of his career helping with AIDS research. Vickers acted as the first African American dean of the School of Medicine at the University of Alabama at Birmingham.

== Death and legacy ==
Watkins died in Baltimore on April 11, 2015, at the age of 70, due to a heart attack and subsequent stroke. Vanderbilt University established the Levi Watkins Jr., M.D. Chair in his honor on April 30. A lecture series called the Levi Watkins Jr., M.D. Lecture on Diversity in Medical Education was named after him in 2002, and is held each year at Vanderbilt University. Students and faculty receive rewards based on their efforts in creating communities for minorities at the university. A plaque with his picture and description of his life is installed at The Marble Fountain in Patterson Park, in Baltimore. The Johns Hopkins Hospital renamed the Outpatient Center on the East Baltimore campus to the Levi Watkins Jr. Outpatient Center in June, 2023.

Today, much of his work is still represented in the field of medicine. Watkins contributed to the advancement of surgical techniques and to the defibrillator, which are all still used today. In addition, his work on angiotensin blockers has helped many patients in need of treatment for congestive heart failure, even those who are unable to tolerate other drugs.
