= Jeff Wrana =

Cancer researcher

- Born: Scarborough, Ontario, Canada
- Awards: Paul Marks Prize for Cancer Research (2005)

Academic background
- Education: BSc, 1984, PhD, Biochemistry, 1991, University of Toronto
- Thesis: Regulation of connective tissue cells by transforming growth factor-[beta] (1991)

Academic work
- Institutions: University of Toronto; Lunenfeld-Tanenbaum Research Institute; Mount Sinai Hospital

Jeffrey L. Wrana is a Canadian cancer researcher. He is the CIBC Breast Cancer Research Scientist and Mary Janigan Research Chair in Molecular Cancer Therapeutic at Mount Sinai Hospital and University of Toronto (U of T). As a Tier 1 Canada Research Chair in Medical Genetics and Microbiology at U of T, Wrana was elected a Fellow of the Royal Society of Canada.

== Early life and education ==
Wrana is a native to Scarborough, Ontario, Canada. He completed his Bachelor of Science degree at the University College, Toronto in 1984 and his PhD in 1991 at the University of Toronto (U of T). Following his PhD, Wrana completed his postdoctoral training at the Memorial Sloan Kettering Cancer Center from 1990 to 1995. As a postdoctoral fellow, he wrote a seminal paper explaining how one signalling rogue molecule in cancers could communicate with other cells.

== Career ==
Following his postdoctoral fellowship, Wrana accepted a research position at Mount Sinai Hospital in Toronto. Working alongside Liliana Attisano, Wrana co-discovered that the mutation of the MADR2 gene was responsible for some forms of colon cancer. Upon accepting a professorship position at his alma mater, Wrana began focusing on the transforming growth factor-beta (TGF-) family of cell signalling proteins that regulate cell growth and function. In his laboratory, Wrana helped to define the components of the TGF-β signalling pathway and determine how its receptors are internalized by cells. Beyond U of T, Wrana also continued to work as a Howard Hughes Medical Institute International Research Scholar. Wrana's efforts were recognized with the 2005 Paul Marks Prize for Cancer Research by the Memorial Sloan-Kettering Cancer Center. He was also awarded a seven-year Tier 1 Canada Research Chair (CRC) in Medical Genetics and Microbiology at U of T. In his first year as a CRC, Wrana was elected a Fellow of the Royal Society of Canada's Division of Life Sciences.

In 2009, Wrana and colleague Ian Taylor developed Dynamic Network Modularity (Dynemo), a biological model that could help physicians predict whether a woman is more likely to survive and recover from breast cancer: it achieved this by analysing how proteins and other components within cancer cells interact with each other in order to form networks, and how alterations of these processes could have an impact on tumorigenesis, as well as the usage of specific drugs in oncological therapies. His efforts were recognised with the Premier's 2010 Summit Award for Medical Research. Wrana later collaborated with Andras Nagy at Mount Sinai Hospital on a new stem cell project. After Nagy discovered a new method to create pluripotent stem cells without disrupting healthy genes, their laboratories discovered ways to improve the efficiency of stem cell creation for use in tissue regeneration. In a mouse model of breast cancer, Wrana's research team also found that expression of the Cd81 protein in cancer-associated fibroblasts induced exosomal trafficking of Wnt11 to cancer cells, promoting metastasis through induction of the core planar cell polarity pathway.

In 2015, Wrana was appointed the inaugural CIBC Scientist in Breast Cancer Research at the Lunenfeld-Tanenbaum Research Institute. In this role, he began investigating how different cells contribute to gut development and maintenance. By 2018, Wrana and his postdoctoral fellow had co-discovered a new type of cell in the intestinal lining that they called the "revival stem cell". This new cell, which is only active for 24 hours, is responsible for creating new adult stem cells when the intestinal lining is damaged and functions to rebuild the intestinal lining. He was recognised with the 2018 McLaughlin Medal from the Royal Society of Canada for his "pivotal contributions to our understanding of biology, human diseases, and its treatment" and his leadership in the promotion of "Canadian science through collaborative research facilities and international impact."

During the COVID-19 pandemic, Wrana used his laboratory and resources to assist in analysing thousands of COVID-19 tests across Ontario. In August 2020, his research team used the robotics platform to screen thousands of positive samples for variants by rapidly sequencing fingerprint regions of the viral genome to look for key mutations. The following year, Wrana was a co-investigator in a project aimed at analysing 10,000 COVID-19 tests at once through C19-SPAR-Seq.
