= Matthew Meyerson =

American pathologist

- Born: June 4, 1963 (age 63); Boston, Massachusetts, US
- Parent(s): Martin Meyerson; Margy Meyerson

Academic background
- Education: BSc, chemistry and physics, 1985, MD, 1993, PhD, 1994, Harvard University
- Thesis: Human cyclin-dependent kinases and cell cycle regulation (1994)

Academic work
- Institutions: Dana–Farber Cancer Institute; Foundation Medicine

Matthew Langer Meyerson (born June 4, 1963) is an American pathologist and the Charles A. Dana Chair in Human Cancer Genetics at the Dana-Farber Cancer Institute. He is also director of the Center for Cancer Genomics at the Dana-Farber Cancer Institute, and the Director of Cancer Genomics at the Broad Institute of MIT and Harvard.

== Early life and education ==
Meyerson was born on June 4, 1963, in Boston, Massachusetts to parents Martin Meyerson and Margy Meyerson. His father became the first Jewish president of a major university upon accepting an appointment at the University of Pennsylvania. Meyerson and his siblings were subsequently raised in Philadelphia where his older sister was diagnosed with Crohn's disease and mental illness. This played a major role in Meyerson pursuing a career in medicine.

Following high school, Meyerson completed his Bachelor's degree at Harvard University. During college, he conducted research on quinones in Leslie Dutton's laboratory at the University of Pennsylvania and on enzyme evolution in Steven Benner's laboratory at Harvard. Upon completing his undergraduate degree in 1985, Meyerson spent a year in Japan at the University of Kyoto before beginning began medical school. During his third year at Harvard Medical School, while doing a rotation at Massachusetts General Hospital (MGH), he became interested in molecular biology revolution and cancer research. He then completed a residency in clinical pathology at MGH and a research fellowship with Robert Weinberg at the Whitehead Institute. Based on Weinberg's work, Meyerson and Christopher M. Counter identified the telomerase catalytic subunit gene in 1997.

== Career ==
Meyerson joined the faculty at the Dana–Farber Cancer Institute (DFCI) in 1998 where he continued to focus on using genomic approaches to understand the biology and genetics of human lung carcinomas. As an assistant professor, Meyerson co-developed a new mathematical tool that uses the process of elimination to discover microbes in human tissue. Through studies, it was determined that the tool successfully detected a specific type of human papillomavirus in cervical cells. Following this development, Meyerson collaborated with fellow Harvard researchers to identify mutations in lung cancer that could be targeted therapeutically. This led to a collaborative study between DFCI and Japan to research patients with lung cancer. The scientists found that patients whose lung cancers harbor a malfunctioning version of EGFR protein responded well to the drug gefitinib. This was the first successful study to support an approach that seeks a systematic route to the development of new cancer therapies. In 2007, Meyerson and Levi Garraway published a paper detailing a method for large-panel testing of 238 DNA mutations. This subsequently led to the establishment of Foundation Medicine. In 2009, he received the Paul Marks Prize for Cancer Research for the discovery of mutations in lung cancer cells.

In 2011, Meyerson's made another discovery that advanced the study of cancer: colorectal cancer tissue contains high levels of several types of bacteria, most notably Fusobacterium nucleatum. His laboratory also led to the development of the first targeted therapy lung cancer drug. As a result of these discoveries, Meyerson was recognized by Breathe Deep Boston as a Walk Honoree in 2014. Two years later, Meyerson was the recipient of the 2016 Han-Mo Koo Memorial Award for his contributions to the understanding of cancer genomics and targeted therapies. In 2018, Meyerson was elected to the National Academy of Medicine for the "discovery of EGFR mutations in lung cancer and their ability to predict responsiveness to EGFR inhibitors, thereby helping to establish the current paradigm of precision cancer therapy."

During the COVID-19 pandemic, Meyerson co-authored Pervasive generation of non-canonical subgenomic RNAs by SARS-CoV-2 with Jason Nomburg and James A. DeCaprio. He was also elected a Fellow of the American Association for the Advancement of Science as someone who has scientifically or socially distinguished efforts to advance science or its applications. In 2021, Meyerson was recognized as a Giant of Cancer in Prevention/Genetics by Onclive.

== Personal life ==
Meyerson married his wife, fellow Harvard student Sandra Hoenig, in a Jewish ceremony in 1988.
