= Nikola Pavletich =

Naseer Rajput

Nikola Panayot Pavletich is the former chair of structural biology at Memorial Sloan Kettering Cancer Center.

== Education ==
Pavletich received his BS in chemistry from Caltech in 1988 and his PhD in molecular biology and genetics from Johns Hopkins University School of Medicine in 1991. He did a postdoc at MIT with Carl Pabo.

== Career ==
He joined the faculty at Sloan Kettering in 1993 and was named chair of the Structural Biology Program in 2003. He has been an HHMI investigator since 1997.

His laboratory researches malignant cell growth and DNA damage contributing to the development of cancer. DNA damage repair is a significant factor in whether a cell will become cancerous after genetic insult. Some of his major focuses have been the mTOR pathway and BRCA1. His lab uses x-ray crystallography to determine how proteins interact.

== Awards ==
- 1994 – Pew Scholar
- 1995 – Beckman Young Investigators Award
- 1999 – MIT Innovators under 35
- 2000 – AACR Award for Outstanding Achievement in Cancer Research
- 2003 – Paul Marks Prize for Cancer Research
- 2012 – Elected member of the National Academy of Sciences
- 2014 – Elected fellow of the American Academy of Arts and Sciences
- 2015 – Elected member of the Institute of Medicine
- Cornelius P. Rhoads Memorial Award, American Association for Cancer Research
- DuPont-Merck Young Investigator Award, The Protein Society
