= Alfred P. Sloan Jr. Prize =

Scientific prize for cancer research

The Alfred P. Sloan Jr. Prize was a $250,000 award given by the General Motors Cancer Research Foundation for outstanding oncological research.

The prize was awarded annually from 1979 to 2005. Of the winners, 15 out of 37 have gone on to win either a Nobel Prize in Physiology or Medicine or a Nobel Prize in Chemistry.

in 2006, due to budget constraints, the Alfred P. Sloan Jr. prize, the Charles K. Kettering prize, and the Charles S. Mott Prize were consolidated into a single General Motors Cancer Research Award which also had a value of $250,000. The first and only winner of the General Motors Cancer Research Award was Napoleone Ferrara.

After 2006 no more prizes were awarded.

== Laureates ==
Year	Winner
2005	Roger D. Kornberg (Nobel Prize in Chemistry 2006)
2004	Thomas J. Kelly
2004	Bruce Stillman
2003	Pierre Chambon
2003	Ronald M. Evans
2002	John E. Sulston (Nobel Prize in Physiology or Medicine 2002)
2002	Robert H. Waterston
2001	Elizabeth Blackburn (Nobel Prize in Physiology or Medicine 2009)
2000	Avram Hershko (Nobel Prize in Chemistry 2004)
2000	Alexander Varshavsky
1999	Robert G. Roeder
1999	Robert Tjian
1998	H. Robert Horvitz (Nobel Prize in Physiology or Medicine 2002)
1997	Paul Nurse (Nobel Prize in Physiology or Medicine 2001)
1996	Mark M. Davis
1996	Tak Wah Mak
1995	Ed Harlow
1994	Mario Capecchi (Nobel Prize in Physiology or Medicine 2007)
1994	Oliver Smithies (Nobel Prize in Physiology or Medicine 2007)
1993	Hidesaburo Hanafusa
1992	Christiane Nüsslein-Volhard (Nobel Prize in Physiology or Medicine 1995)
1991	Leland H. Hartwell (Nobel Prize in Physiology or Medicine 2001)
1990	Mark Ptashne
1989	Donald Metcalf
1989	Leo Sachs
1988	Yasutomi Nishizuka
1987	Robert Allan Weinberg
1986	Phillip Allen Sharp (Nobel Prize in Physiology or Medicine 1993)
1985	Robert Schimke
1984	John Michael Bishop (Nobel Prize in Physiology or Medicine 1989)
1984	Harold Elliot Varmus (Nobel Prize in Physiology or Medicine 1989)
1983	Raymond L. Erikson
1982	Stanley Cohen (Nobel Prize in Physiology or Medicine 1986)
1981	César Milstein (Nobel Prize in Physiology or Medicine 1984)
1981	Wallace P. Rowe
1980	Isaac Berenblum
1979	George Klein

== See also ==
- List of medicine awards
