= Bruce William Stillman =

Australian biochemist and cancer researcher

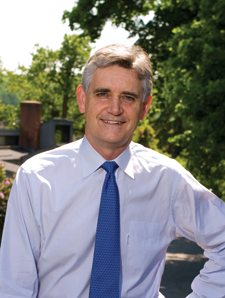
- Born: 16 October 1953 (age 72); Melbourne, Australia
- Education: University of Sydney (BSc); Australian National University (PhD)
- Spouse: Grace Stillman
- Children: 2
- Awards: Alfred P. Sloan, Jr. Prize, Louisa Gross Horwitz Prize, Canada Gairdner International Award, Dr. H. P. Heineken Prize
- Scientific career
- Fields: Biochemistry
- Workplaces: Cold Spring Harbor Laboratory

Bruce William Stillman AO FAA FRS (born 16 October 1953) is a biochemist and cancer researcher who has served as the Director of Cold Spring Harbor Laboratory (CSHL) since 1994 and President since 2003. He also served as the Director of its NCI-designated Cancer Center for 25 years from 1992 to 2016. Stillman is also an Adjunct Professor of Microbiology and Immunology at Stony Brook University.

During his leadership, CSHL has been ranked as the No. 1 institution in molecular biology and genetics research by Thomson Reuters. Stillman's research focuses on how chromosomes are duplicated in human cells and in yeast Saccharomyces cerevisiae; the mechanisms that ensure accurate inheritance of genetic material from one generation to the next; and how missteps in this process lead to cancer. For his accomplishments, Stillman has received numerous awards, including the Alfred P. Sloan, Jr. Prize in 2004 and the 2010 Louisa Gross Horwitz Prize, both of which he shared with Thomas J. Kelly of Memorial Sloan-Kettering Cancer Center, as well as the 2019 Canada Gairdner International Award for biomedical research, which he shared with John Diffley.

== Life and career ==
Stillman was educated at Glen Waverley High School (1966-1969) and Sydney Boys High School (1970–71), then graduated with First Class honours from the University of Sydney, and earned his PhD from the John Curtin School of Medical Research at the Australian National University.

He began his career at Cold Spring Harbor Laboratory in 1979 with investigations into how DNA is copied, starting with studying DNA replication of human adenovirus as a model. He then began to study how the genome of simian virus 40 (SV40) is duplicated in cells. Eventually his research focused on how cellular chromosomes are duplicated and how the entire process is regulated in cells, studying the process primarily in the yeast S. cerevisiae and in human cells. This work provided key insights into how both virus and cellular oncoproteins manipulate cellular physiology to bring about oncogenic transformation.

One of his most significant achievements was the biochemical reconstitution with purified proteins of the complete replication of the SV40 DNA genome. This system utilized the virus-encoded T antigen that binds to the SV40 virus origin of DNA replication, the start site for DNA synthesis, coupled with purified human proteins, many of them discovered by Stillman and his colleagues. These proteins include RPA, RFC, PCNA, and the discovery that multiple DNA polymerases participate in the process of copying DNA, often switching from one polymerase to the other.

Another major accomplishment was the discovery of the Origin Recognition Complex (ORC), a key protein made up of six subunits that binds to cellular origins of DNA replication and coordinates the entire process of initiating a complete cycle of DNA replication throughout the entire cell genome. Soon after the discovery of ORC, Stillman's group identified other initiation proteins that together form the pre-replication complex (pre-RC), which makes chromosomes competent for the subsequent initiation of DNA replication during the S phase of the cell cycle. His group's recent studies have revealed the intricate details of the mechanism of the initiation of DNA replication and illuminated how this process is regulated throughout the cell cycle, including the mechanisms that prevent DNA replication from occurring more than once during each cell cycle. These studies include elucidation of the structure of ORC and its associated pre-RC proteins.

Stillman has also studied how the proteins associated with the cellular DNA are inherited as cells divide. The proteins that combine with DNA to organize the genome into a chromatin structure include histones. He developed a biochemical system to study DNA replication-coupled chromatin assembly in a test tube and discovered proteins such as Chromatin Assembly Factor-1 (CAF-1) that cooperate with the DNA replication machinery to assemble new histones onto the DNA. These studies resulted in understanding how chromatin is inherited.

== Honors and awards ==
- Commonwealth Postgraduate Award (1976–1978)
- Damon Runyon-Walter Winchell Cancer Fund Fellow (1979–1980)
- Rita Allen Foundation Scholar (1982–1987)
- Merit Award – National Institutes of Health (1986)
- The Royal Society (London), Elected Fellow (1993)
- Julian Wells Medal, Genome Conference, Australia (1994)
- Ida Beam Visiting Professor-University of Iowa (1996)
- Order of Australia, AO (1999)
- National Academy of Sciences, Elected Foreign Associate (2000); Elected Member (2013)
- American Academy of Microbiology, Elected Fellow (2000)
- Doctor of Humane Letters (honoris causa), Hofstra University (2001)
- Doctor of Science (honoris causa), New York Institute of Technology (2001)
- European Molecular Biology Organization, Associate Member (2001)
- Doctor of Science (honoris causa), Stony Brook University (2002)
- Alfred P. Sloan, Jr. Prize for Cancer Research, (2004)
- Curtin Medal for Excellence in Medical Research, John Curtin School of Medical Research, Australian National University (2006)
- Doctor of Science, (honoris causa), Long Island University (2007)
- Doctor of Science (honoris causa), University of Sydney (2008)
- American Academy of Arts and Sciences, Elected Member (2008)
- Louisa Gross Horwitz Prize, Columbia University (2010)
- Fellow of the Australian Academy of Science, Elected Corresponding Fellow (2012)
- Herbert Tabor Research Award, American Society for Biochemistry and Molecular Biology (ASBMB) (2014)
- Fellow, National Academy of Inventors (2016)
- Doctor of Science, (honoris causa), Clarkson University (2018)
- Canada Gairdner International Award (2019)
- Fellow, American Association for Cancer Research (AACR) Academy (2019)
- Dr. H. P. Heineken Prize (2020)
- Australian Advance Global Impact Award (2021)
- Doctor of Laws (honoris causa), Monash University (2022)
- Earl and Thressa Stadman Distinguished Scientist Award, American Society for Biochemistry and Molecular Biology (ASBMB) (2024)

== Professional activities ==
Stillman is a member of the Medical Advisory Board of the Howard Hughes Medical Institute and advises a number of other research organizations including the David H. Koch Institute for Integrative Cancer Research at MIT. He is a former advisor to the Walter and Eliza Hall Institute of Medical Research in Melbourne, Australia, the Lewis-Sigler Institute at Princeton University, and advises a number of corporations. He is past co-chair of the Board of Scientific Councilors of the National Cancer Institute, past vice-chair of the National Cancer Policy Board of the National Institute of Medicine and past member of the Board on Life Sciences of the National Research Council. He also served as a member of the National Cancer Institute Board of Scientific Advisors and as a member of the State University of New York Research Council.
