= Paul Marks (scientist) =

American oncologist (1926–2020)

- Born: August 16, 1926; Mahanoy City, Pennsylvania, U.S.
- Died: April 28, 2020 (aged 93); Manhattan, New York City, NY, U.S.
- Education: Columbia Medical School
- Known for: Paul Marks Prize for Cancer Research
- Children: Andrew Marks; Matthew Marks; Elizabeth Ostrer
- Scientific career
- Workplaces: Columbia University; National Institutes of Health; Memorial Sloan Kettering Cancer Center

Paul Alan Marks (August 16, 1926 – April 28, 2020) was a medical doctor, researcher and administrator. He was a faculty member and president at Memorial Sloan Kettering Cancer Center.

== Background ==
Marks was born in Mahanoy City, Pennsylvania, in 1926, to Robert Marks and Sarah Bohorad. Marks attended Columbia College and Columbia Medical School. After completing postdoctoral research at the United States National Institutes of Health and at the Institut Pasteur in France, he joined the faculty at Columbia University. Marks served as dean of the Medical Faculty at Columbia University from 1970 to 1973. He was president and chief executive officer at Memorial Sloan Kettering from 1980 until 1999. Marks died at his Manhattan home from pulmonary fibrosis and lung cancer on April 28, 2020, at the age of 93.

== Scholarly activities ==
Marks contributed to the fields of genetics and oncology. His recent work was focused on histone deacetylases (HDACs) and chemicals that interfere with HDAC enzymatic activities (HDAC inhibitors or HDIs). Marks and others found that drugs such as Trichostatin A and SAHA (vorinostat) can serve as anticancer agents.

Marks published more than 400 scientific articles and was the editor-in-chief of journals including the Journal of Clinical Investigation and Blood.

== Honors and affiliations ==
- Member, National Academy of Sciences
- Member, Institute of Medicine
- Recipient, President's National Medal of Science
- Fellow, American Academy of Arts and Sciences
- Fellow, The American Philosophical Society

== Paul Marks Prize for Cancer Research ==
The Paul Marks Prize for Cancer Research was established by Memorial Sloan Kettering to honor Marks's contributions "as a distinguished scientist and leader". The prize has been awarded every two years since 2001.

== Works ==
- editor, Cancer Research in the People's Republic of China and the United States of America (1981)
