= Titia de Lange =

Dutch geneticist

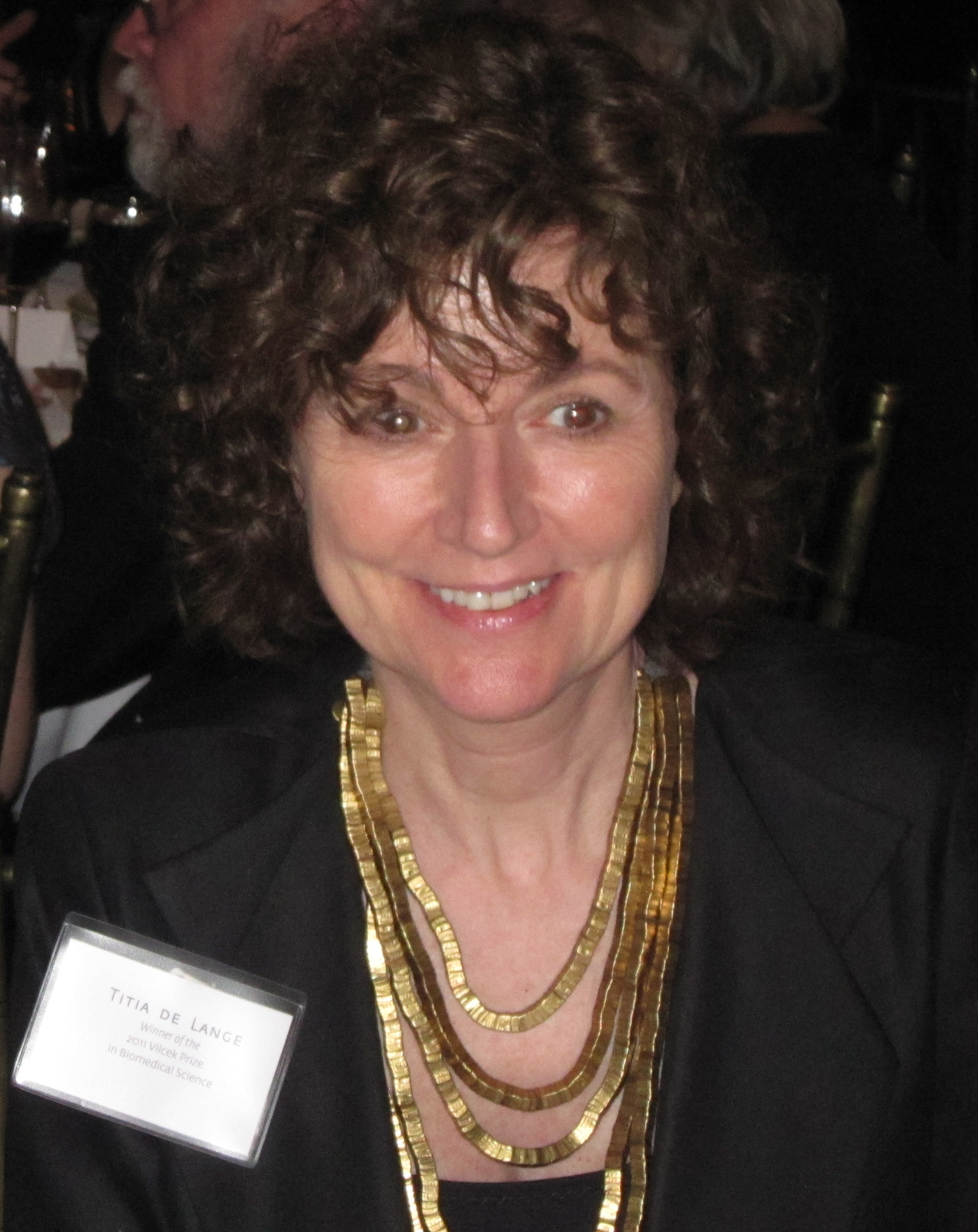
- Titia de Lange at the Vilcek Prize Ceremony in 2011
- Born: Titia de lange November 11, 1955 (age 70); Rotterdam
- Education: University of Amsterdam (Ph.D)
- Known for: Shelterin; Telomeres
- Awards: Paul Marks Prize for Cancer Research (2001); Heineken Prize (2012); Breakthrough Prize in Life Sciences (2013); Canada Gairdner International Award (2014); Rosenstiel Award (2017)
- Scientific career
- Fields: Molecular Biology, Cell Biology, and Genetics
- Workplaces: The Rockefeller University
- Doctoral advisor: Piet Borst
- Website: delangelab.rockefeller.edu

Titia de Lange (born 11 November 1955, in Rotterdam) is the Director of the Anderson Center for Cancer Research, the Leon Hess professor and the head of Laboratory Cell Biology and Genetics at Rockefeller University.

De Lange obtained her Masters on "Chromatin structure of the human β-globin gene locus" at the University of Amsterdam in 1981, and subsequently her PhD at the same institution in 1985 with Piet Borst on surface antigen genes in trypanosomes. In 1985 she joined Harold Varmus's lab at the University of California, San Francisco. Since 1990 she has had a faculty position at the Rockefeller University. In 2011, de Lange received the Vilcek Prize in Biomedical Science. In 2013 she won a Breakthrough Prize in Life Sciences, worth $3 million, for her research on telomeres.

In 2000 she became correspondent of the Royal Netherlands Academy of Arts and Sciences.

== Career ==
Titia de Lange attended the University of Amsterdam where she received her bachelor's and master's degree in biochemistry. She also earned her Ph.D. from the University of Amsterdam while working at the Netherlands Cancer Institute. In 1985, she accepted a postdoctoral fellowship position at the University of California, San Francisco. In 1990, de Lange started her own lab at Rockefeller University. She is currently the Leon Hess Professor as well as the Director of the Anderson Center for Cancer Research at Rockefeller University. She won the Breakthrough Prize in Life Sciences in 2013 for her research on telomeres, illuminating how they protect chromosome ends and their role in genome instability in cancer by mapping the complex of molecules that loops the strands together and protects them. In addition to making headway in revealing the structure of DNA, her research has implications for the understanding of aging and cancer.

== Research ==
Titia de Lange originally wanted to study chemistry after finishing high school in the Netherlands but the lack of women in chemistry among students and teachers alike convinced her to study biology with a biochemistry track instead. In her time at the University of Amsterdam she worked for mentor Richard Flavell at the National Institute for Medical Research where she completed her master's thesis. Her thesis focused on DNA translocation in γβ-thalassemia, a very rare form of thalassemia. Her research identified a patient with γβ-thalassemia with a DNA translocation that caused the inactivation of the β-Globin gene. de Lange spoke highly of the lab saying "That was where I first saw how science is really done. … It was a very vibrant, competitive, international lab. It was a lot of fun, so that made me stay in science."

De Lange started to gain interest in telomeres while earning her Ph.D. at the Netherlands Cancer Institute. Telomeres gradually became the major focus of her research. After receiving her Ph.D. in 1985, de Lange completed a postdoctoral fellowship at the University of California, San Francisco in Harold Varmus's Lab from 1985 to 1990. While working at UCSF, de Lange continued her work on telomeres. de Lange discovered that sperm cells have telomeres that are several kilobase pairs longer than somatic cells. She also found that tumor cells also have significantly shorter telomeres. This research was significant in establishing the role of telomeres in both aging as well as cancer. Telomeres are repetitive nucleotide sequences at the ends of chromosomes that function as protective elements from improper DNA repair. The nucleotide sequence of telomeres is TTAGGG. As a person ages telomeres are gradually shortened with each round of DNA replication, as not all of the DNA sequence is fully replicated. Chromosome ends are threatened by various pathways, DNA-damage signaling pathways involving ATM or ATR kinase as well as double-strand break repair pathways, Non-homologous end joining or homology-directed repair.

At Rockefeller University her research focused on identifying proteins associated with telomeres and their role in protecting telomeres from processes of DNA repair. In her first several years she dedicated a long amount of time and resources to identifying the major protein components of human telomeres. In 1995, she identified and purified the Telomeric-repeat binding factor protein 1 (TRF1). With the assistance of Bas van Steensel, de Lange conducted various studies on proteins associated with telomeres. She found that TRF1 is crucial in the regulation of the length of telomeres. In her research, she proposed that TRF1 inhibits the action of telomerase. Telomerase is an RNA dependent DNA polymerase that can elongate telomeres and is essential in the maintenance of telomeric DNA. Telomerase can counteract the shortening of telomeres, which occurs during the DNA replication process. She and her co-investigators, Bas van Steensel and Agata Smogorzewska, also discovered the protein TRF2 and found that it prevents the end-to-end fusing of telomeres, in addition to other functions.

One of de Lange's major discoveries was the discovery of the t-loop structure of telomeres in her collaboration with Jack Griffith. This was shown through electron microscopy demonstrating that linear telomeric DNA can be remodeled by TRF2 into duplex loops (t loops). This architectural change allows for TRF2 to sequester the ends of telomeres, which function to safeguard telomeres by covering overhanging single strands of DNA. This mechanism protects against the improper activation of DNA damage checkpoints by natural chromosome ends. Previous research had observed that in addition to protecting the ends of chromosomes, telomeric complexes also allow cells to distinguish random DNA breaks and natural chromosome ends.

In 2005, de Lange came to the crucial realization that six telomeric proteins form a dynamic protein complex, that she named shelterin, named for its function of protecting chromosome ends. The six shelterin subunits are: TRF1, TRF2, TIN2, Rap1, TPP1, and POT1. Shelterin subunits are not the only proteins that associate with telomeres but they differ from other proteins by meeting the criteria of not accumulating in areas beside chromosome ends, their function is limited to telomeres, and they are present at telomeres throughout the cell cycle. Shelterin allows for telomeres to be essentially hidden from the DNA damage surveillance, without its safeguarding chromosome ends are inappropriately processed by DNA repair pathways where the telomeres would be mistaken for damaged DNA.

Titia de Lange's research has proven to be invaluable in the area of telomere research and has led to greater understanding for cancer development as well as genome maintenance. Her research has catalyzed more research into the important role of telomeres in tumor development.

== Awards ==
De Lange is the recipient of several awards including the 2001 Paul Marks Prize for Cancer Research, the 2008 Massachusetts General Hospital Cancer Center Prize, the 2010 AACR Clowes Memorial Award, the 2011 Vanderbilt Prize in Biomedical Science, the 2011 Vilcek Prize in Biomedical Science, the 2013 Breakthrough Prize in Life Sciences, the 2014 Gairdner International Award, and the 2017 Rosenstiel Award.

She is an elected member of multiple organizations including the American Academy of Arts and Sciences, The European Molecular Biology Organization, and the Royal Dutch Academy of Sciences. In 2022 she was elected a Foreign Member of the Royal Society.
