= Ralph DeBerardinis =

American physician-scientist

Ralph J. DeBerardinis
- Awards: Paul Marks Prize for Cancer Research; Edith and Peter O'Donnell Award in Medicine
- Scientific career
- Fields: Cancer; Metabolism
- Thesis: [ProQuest 304449466 Retrotransposition and evolution of L1 sequences in mammalian genomes] (1998)
- Doctoral advisor: Haig H. Kazazian Jr
- Other academic advisors: Craig Thompson
- Website: https://cri.utsw.edu/scientists/ralph-deberardinis-laboratory/

Ralph J. DeBerardinis is an American physician-scientist, the chief of the Division of Pediatric Genetics and Metabolism at the Children’s Medical Center Research Institute at UT Southwestern and a professor at the University of Texas Southwestern Medical Center. DeBerardinis became a Howard Hughes Medical Institute Investigator in 2018. DeBerardinis was elected to the National Academy of Medicine in 2020. DeBerardinis is known for his contributions to research on cancer and pediatric inborn errors of metabolism.

== Biography ==
DeBerardinis was born and raised in the Philadelphia area. DeBerardinis received a Bachelor of Science (BS) degree from St. Joseph’s University and M.D. and Ph.D. degrees from the University of Pennsylvania. DeBerardinis completed his Ph.D. in the laboratory of Haig H. Kazazian Jr. DeBerardinis was an inaugural trainee of the combined Pediatrics/Genetics Residency program at The Children’s Hospital of Philadelphia (CHOP). DeBerardinis has achieved board certifications in clinical biochemical genetics, medical genetics, and pediatrics. DeBerardinis performed his postdoctoral research in the laboratory of Craig Thompson while he was at the Penn Cancer Center. After completing his postdoctoral work, DeBerardinis opened his own research laboratory in 2008 at University of Texas Southwestern Medical Center.

DeBerardinis has been on the Scientific Advisory Boards of several companies, including Agios Pharmaceuticals, Peloton Therapeutics, and Vida Ventures. As of April 2022, DeBerardinis has authored over 350 publications and has an h-index of 94.

== Scientific contributions ==
DeBerardinis is well known for his use of isotope-tracing metabolomics to identify how tumors utilize different nutrients. Using genomics and metabolomics approaches, DeBerardinis also has worked to identify novel mutations that affect the activity of metabolic enzymes.

== Selected awards and honors ==
- 2017 Outstanding Investigator Award, National Cancer Institute
- 2018 Howard Hughes Medical Institute Investigator
- 2019 TAMEST Edith and Peter O'Donnell Award in Medicine
- 2020 National Academy of Medicine
- 2021 Paul Marks Prize for Cancer Research

== Selected publications ==
- Mullen, Andrew R.; Wheaton, William W.; Jin, Eunsook S.; Chen, Pei-Hsuan; Sullivan, Lucas B.; Cheng, Tzuling; Yang, Youfeng; Linehan, W. Marston; Chandel, Navdeep S.; DeBerardinis, Ralph J. (January 2012). "Reductive carboxylation supports growth in tumour cells with defective mitochondria". Nature. 481 (7381): 385–388. Bibcode:2012Natur.481..385M. doi:10.1038/nature10642. PMC 3262117. PMID 22101431.
- Marin-Valencia, Isaac; Yang, Chendong; Mashimo, Tomoyuki; Cho, Steve; Baek, Hyeonman; Yang, Xiao-Li; Rajagopalan, Kartik N.; Maddie, Melissa; Vemireddy, Vamsidhara; Zhao, Zhenze; Cai, Ling; Good, Levi; Tu, Benjamin P.; Hatanpaa, Kimmo J.; Mickey, Bruce E.; Matés, José M.; Pascual, Juan M.; Maher, Elizabeth A.; Malloy, Craig R.; DeBerardinis, Ralph J.; Bachoo, Robert M. (June 2012). "Analysis of Tumor Metabolism Reveals Mitochondrial Glucose Oxidation in Genetically Diverse Human Glioblastomas in the Mouse Brain In Vivo". Cell Metabolism. 15 (6): 827–837. doi:10.1016/j.cmet.2012.05.001. PMC 3372870. PMID 22682223.
- Tasdogan, Alpaslan; Faubert, Brandon; Ramesh, Vijayashree; Ubellacker, Jessalyn M.; Shen, Bo; Solmonson, Ashley; Murphy, Malea M.; Gu, Zhimin; Gu, Wen; Martin, Misty; Kasitinon, Stacy Y.; Vandergriff, Travis; Mathews, Thomas P.; Zhao, Zhiyu; Schadendorf, Dirk; DeBerardinis, Ralph J.; Morrison, Sean J. (2 January 2020). "Metabolic heterogeneity confers differences in melanoma metastatic potential". Nature. 577 (7788): 115–120. doi:10.1038/s41586-019-1847-2. PMC 6930341. PMID 31853067.
- Hensley, Christopher T.; Faubert, Brandon; Yuan, Qing; Lev-Cohain, Naama; Jin, Eunsook; Kim, Jiyeon; Jiang, Lei; Ko, Bookyung; Skelton, Rachael; Loudat, Laurin; Wodzak, Michelle; Klimko, Claire; McMillan, Elizabeth; Butt, Yasmeen; Ni, Min; Oliver, Dwight; Torrealba, Jose; Malloy, Craig R.; Kernstine, Kemp; Lenkinski, Robert E.; DeBerardinis, Ralph J. (February 2016). "Metabolic Heterogeneity in Human Lung Tumors". Cell. 164 (4): 681–694. doi:10.1016/j.cell.2015.12.034. PMC 4752889. PMID 26853473.
- Faubert, Brandon; Li, Kevin Y.; Cai, Ling; Hensley, Christopher T.; Kim, Jiyeon; Zacharias, Lauren G.; Yang, Chendong; Do, Quyen N.; Doucette, Sarah; Burguete, Daniel; Li, Hong; Huet, Giselle; Yuan, Qing; Wigal, Trevor; Butt, Yasmeen; Ni, Min; Torrealba, Jose; Oliver, Dwight; Lenkinski, Robert E.; Malloy, Craig R.; Wachsmann, Jason W.; Young, Jamey D.; Kernstine, Kemp; DeBerardinis, Ralph J. (October 2017). "Lactate Metabolism in Human Lung Tumors". Cell. 171 (2): 358–371.e9. doi:10.1016/j.cell.2017.09.019. PMC 5684706. PMID 28985563.
