= Isaac Berenblum =

Israeli biochemist (1903–2000)

- יצחק ברנבלום
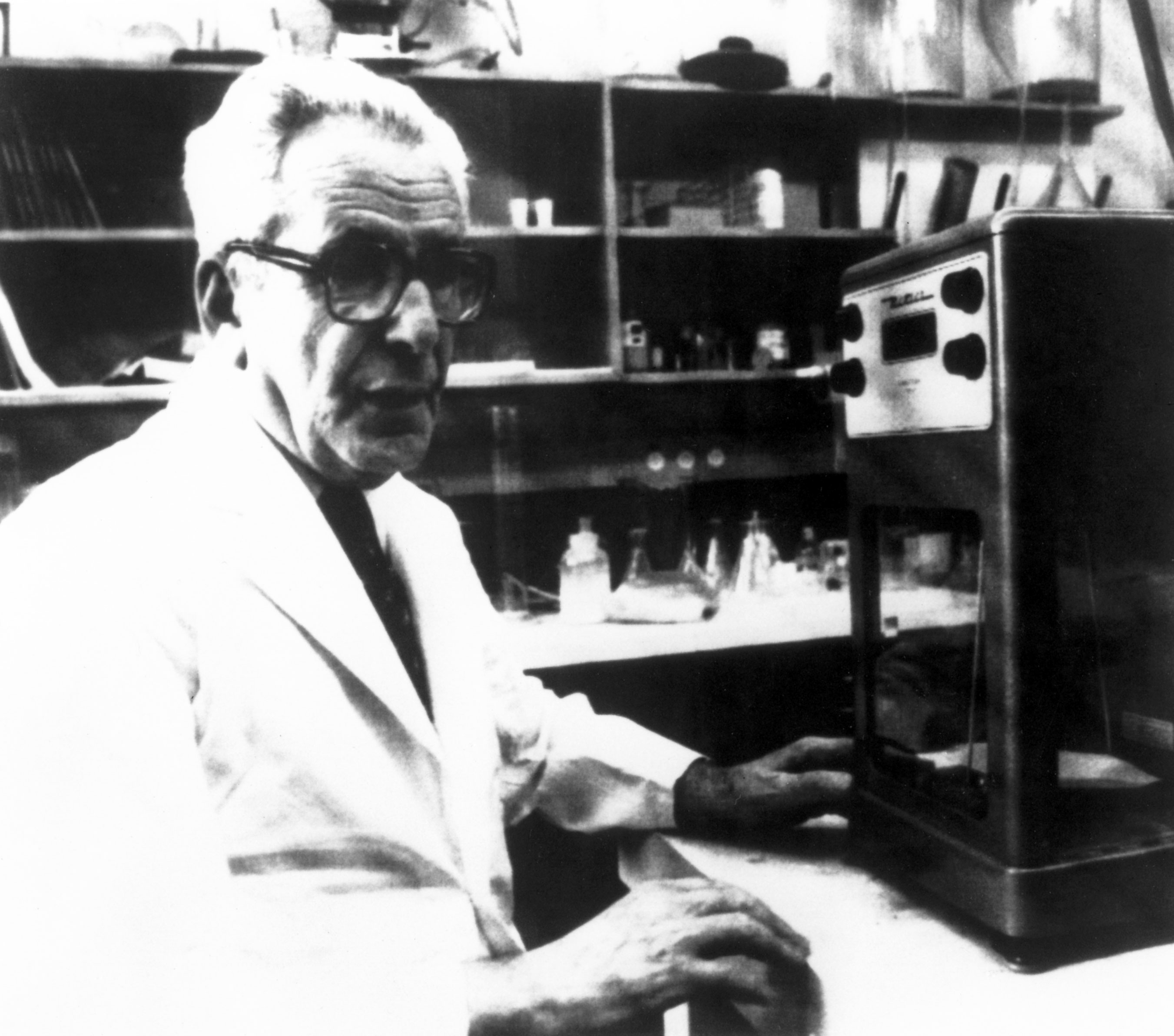
- Born: August 26, 1903
- Died: April 18, 2000 (aged 96)
- Known for: Proposed that cancers need another trigger to grow besides mutated DNA
- Awards: Weizmann Prize (1958), Israel Prize (1974), Alfred P. Sloan Jr. Prize (1980)
- Scientific career
- Fields: Biochemistry

Isaac Berenblum, (Hebrew: יצחק ברנבלום; born 26 August 1903, died 18 April 2000) was an Israeli biochemist, who in 1947 proposed that cancers need another trigger to grow besides mutated DNA.

== Awards ==
- In 1958, he was awarded the Weizmann Prize for his research in experimental biology, especially on neoplastic diseases.
- In 1974, he was awarded the Israel Prize, in life science.
- In 1980, he received the Alfred P. Sloan Jr. Prize given by the General Motors Cancer Research Foundation.

== See also ==
- List of Israel Prize recipients
