= Agata Smogorzewska =

Polish-born scientist

Agata Smogorzewska is a Polish-born scientist. She is an associate professor at Rockefeller University, heading the Laboratory of Genome Maintenance. Her work primarily focuses on DNA interstrand crosslink repair and the diseases resulting from deficiencies in this repair pathway, including Fanconi anemia and karyomegalic interstitial nephritis.

== Early life and education ==
After finishing high school in Poland, Smogorzewska completed her Bachelor of Science in molecular biology and biochemistry in 1995 at the University of Southern California. She then went on to enroll in the tri-institutional M.D., Ph.D. program of Weill Cornell, Rockefeller and Sloan Kettering, finishing her Ph.D. thesis studies on the functions of the telomeric protein, TRF2, in the lab of Dr. Titia de Lange at Rockefeller University in 2002, and her medical degree from Weill Cornell in 2003. Smogorzewska then went on to a residency in clinical pathology at the Massachusetts General Hospital from 2003 to 2006, becoming a postdoctoral researcher at Harvard Medical School between 2005 and 2009 under Dr. Stephen Elledge where she discovered the Fanconi anemia protein FANCI.

== Career and research ==
Smogorzewska became an assistant professor at Rockefeller University in 2009 and was subsequently elevated to associate professor in 2015. Her lab focuses on DNA repair mechanisms, particularly the interstrand crosslink repair pathway, which concerns the cellular mechanisms by which the two strands of DNA that have been covalently linked are excised, creating a double strand DNA break that is subsequently processed by factors in the Fanconi anemia and homologous recombination pathways. In particular, Smogorzewska is interested in identifying new genes that are involved in this repair process in order to reveal the mechanisms at play in human diseases that result from deficiencies in interstrand crosslink repair, including Fanconi anemia and karyomegalic interstitial nephritis. To this end, Smogorzewska has successfully identified SLX4, RAD51 and UBE2T as interstrand crosslink repair factors, as well as developed a mouse model of karyomegalic interstitial nephritis. Recently, Smogorzewska has begun studies revolving around how replication stress is addressed by cells to promote genome stability.

Smogorzewska is a part of the American Society for Biochemistry and Molecular Biology, the New York Academy of Sciences, the American Society of Clinical Investigation and the American Society of Human Genetics

== Awards ==
- Harold M. Weintraub Graduate Student Award
- Burroughs Wellcome Fund Award – 2008
- Irma T. Hirschl/Monique Weill-Caulier Trust Research Award – 2010
- Rita Allen Foundation Scholar – 2010
- Doris Duke Charitable Foundation Clinical Scientist Development Award – 2011
- Pershing Square Sohn Prize – 2014
- The Rockefeller University Distinguished Teaching Award – 2014
- David B. Frohnmayer Early Investigator Award – 2015
- Howard Hughes Medical Institute Faculty Scholar – 2016
- Gabrielle H. Reem and Herbert J. Kayden Early-Career Innovation Award – 2017

== Selected publications ==
Regulation of telomerase by telomeric proteins – Annual Review of Biochemistry, 2004

Control of human telomere length by TRF1 and TRF2 – Molecular and Cellular Biology 2000

Identification of the FANCI protein, a monoubiquitinated FANCD2 paralog required for DNA repair – Cell, 2007

Different telomere damage signaling pathways in human and mouse cells – The EMBO Journal, 2002

Fanconi anaemia and the repair of Watson and Crick DNA crosslinks – Nature, 2013

DNA ligase IV-dependent NHEJ of deprotected mammalian telomeres in G1 and G2 – Current Biology, 2002

A genetic screen identifies FAN1, a Fanconi anemia-associated nuclease necessary for DNA interstrand crosslink repair – Molecular Cell 2010
