= Sandra M. Garraway =

Canadian Neuroscientist

- Education: University of Guelph; University of Manitoba; Stony Brook University; Weill Cornell Medical College
- Known for: Role of BDNF and ERK2 in pain sensitization in the spinal cord
- Awards: Department of Defense Congressional Directed Medical Research Programs Award
- Scientific career
- Fields: Neuroscience
- Workplaces: Emory University School of Medicine

Sandra M. Garraway is a Canadian-American neuroscientist and assistant professor of physiology in the Department of Physiology at Emory University School of Medicine in Atlanta, Georgia. Garraway is the director of the Emory Multiplex Immunoassay Core (EMIC) where she assists researchers from both academia and industry to perform, analyze, and interpret their multiplexed immunoassays. Garraway studies the neural mechanisms of spinal nociceptive pain after spinal cord injury and as a postdoctoral researcher she discovered roles for both BDNF and ERK2 in pain sensitization and developed novel siRNA technology to inhibit ERK2 as a treatment for pain.

== Early life and education ==
Garraway pursued her Bachelors of Arts at the University of Guelph, in Guelph, Ontario, Canada. She graduated in 1993 and moved to Mantioba where she pursued her graduate studies at the University of Manitoba, in Winnipeg, Manitoba, Canada. She studied under the mentorship of Shawn Hochman in the Department of Physiology exploring synaptic plasticity in deep dorsal horn (DDH) neurons since they play a fundamental role in nociception and relaying pain information to the brain. Garraway published four first-author papers during her PhD.

=== Mechanisms of plasticity in deep dorsal horn neurons ===
Garraway explored how primary afferent stimulation impacted plasticity, in the form of long term potentiation (LTP) or long term depression (LTD), of the DDH neurons. LTP and LTD had only just been identified in the spinal cord, and Garraway discovered that LTP and LTD can also be induced in the DDH neurons with even lower frequency afferent stimulation. She also found that in rats aged P9-16, only LTP could be produced. These findings shed light on potential mechanisms of prolonged pain sensation, or chronic pain, as LTD and LTP present forms of long lasting cellular memory. Garraway then explored the descending serotonergic projections that modulate the DDH neurons. She used an in vitro slice preparation of DDH neurons and applied various serotonin receptor ligands to assess the effects of modulation at each serotonin receptor subtype in the primary afferent neurons. She found that the afferents are in fact modulated by several serotonin receptors and that 5-HT1A modulation facilitates evoked responses whereas 5-HT7 depressed evoked responses. Her work was one of the first identifications of the presence and effects of 5-HT7 receptors in the spinal cord and her results showed promise in using selective serotonin receptor targeting in the modulation of pain. Garraway then further characterized monoamine transmitter effects in the spinal cord in comparison with the actions of acetylcholine. She found dopamine, serotonin, and norepinephrine depressed postsynaptic potentials and did not modify the passive membrane properties of neurons whereas acetylcholine lead to increased EPSP amplitude. Further, Garraway found that the addition of both serotonin and norepinephrine simultaneously could evoke even greater depression than either in isolation.

=== BDNF and sensitization ===
After completing her graduate studies in 2000, Garraway moved to the United States to pursue her postdoctoral training at the State University of New York at Stony Brook. Studying under Lorne Mendell, she explored the implications of brain-derived neurotrophic factor (BDNF) on central sensitization and exaggerated pain states. Garraway found that BDNF signalling in the dorsal horn led to facilitation, and the initiation of this facilitation was dependent on NMDA receptor signalling and phospholipase C. Garraway then explored how spinal injury impacted the effects of BDNF on lamina II neurons. She found that after neonatal spinal injury, BDNF was no longer able to facilitate dorsal-root EPSCs. After discovering that NMDA receptor dysfunction was not the cause for decreased responses, she elucidated that expression of dysfunctional trkB might be contributing to the decline in BDNF effects after injury.

Garraway then completed a second postdoctoral fellowship in New York City, at the Weill Cornell Medical College. She worked in the Department of Pharmacology and became an instructor of Pharmacology as well. Garraway studied under the mentorship of Charles Inturrisi, exploring methods of chronic pain management and biological mechanisms of pain with which to target. She first designed and tested a novel small interfering RNA that knocked down expression of the NR1 subunit of the NMDA receptor. This led to decreased mechanical allodynia after injection of an inflammatory agent. She then tested the efficacy of the siRNA on formalin-induced phase 2 nociceptive responses, and it was able to significantly reduce them. Both of her results show that vector-derived siRNAs targeting the NR1 subunit of the AMPA receptor might be beneficial in the treatment of pain by reducing expression of genes mediating pain sensation in the spinal cord.

== Career and research ==
In 2008, Garraway moved to Texas A & M University where she became a Research Assistant Professor and worked with James W. Grau exploring the neurobiological underpinnings of learned pain in the spinal cord. In 2014, Garraway was recruited to Emory University where she was appointed to Assistant Professor of Physiology at the School of Medicine. Garraway is also a Faculty Member for the Neuroscience Graduate Program at Emory. In 2019, she was promoted to Scientific Director of the Emory Multiplex Immunoassay Core, where she now guides researchers in both academia and industry in the use of facility equipment and analysis and interpretation of the results of multiplexed immunoassays.

In addition to her role as Scientific Core Director, Garraway is also the Principal Investigator of the Garraway Lab which explores the mechanisms underlying the development of chronic pain after spinal cord injury. Her lab uses peripheral and spinal cord injury models to explore cellular mechanisms of neuropathic pain, how autonomic dysfunction is related to sensitization, and how peripheral and central pain networks interact to lead to chronic pain. The Garraway Lab is funded by the Craig Neilsen Foundation, the National Institutes of Health, and the Department of Defense.

Garraway is also a member of various national and international groups working to study pain and find cures and treatments for pain disorders. Garraway is a member of the International Pain Research Forum and is also a member of The Institute for Rehabilitation and Research (TIRR) Foundation a collaborative research foundation that innovates therapies for people with sustained nervous system damage.

=== Role of BDNF in pain sensitization ===
After discovering a role for spinal cord BDNF signaling in pain sensitization in her postdoc, Garraway explored whether the behavioral correlates of pain were associated with cellular changes mediated by BDNF. She found that nociceptive stimulation decreased expression of BDNF, TrkB, and ERK2 in the dorsal spinal cord. Garraway and her colleagues then found that BDNF signalling mediates the protective and restorative effects of instrumental training in models where pain is controllable. After instrumental training, where rats learned to not flex their hind limb to prevent pain, there were increases in BDNF and increased plasticity. Further, when BDNF was injected during uncontrollable pain stimulation, it blocked allodynia and enabled rats to learn to not extend their hind legs. Overall, her results and work point to the importance of BDNF in beneficial plasticity in pain models and the potential importance of BDNF in plasticity and recovery after spinal cord injury.

=== Role of TNF alpha in chronic pain ===
Garraway also explores the role of Tumor Necrosis Factor alpha (TNFa) signalling in the development and maintenance of chronic pain. In 2015, she discovered increases in TNFa expression after nociceptive stimulation post spinal cord injury and that downstream TNFa signalling may induce apoptosis in neurons and microglia. In 2019, Garraway and her colleagues found that peripheral inflammation increases the onset of mechanical hypersensitivity after spinal cord injury and that TNFa is involved in the early onset sensitization process.

== Awards and honors ==
- 2015 Department of Defense Congressional Directed Medical Research Programs Award
- 2014 Mission Connect Grant - The Institute for Rehabilitation Research

== Select publications ==
- Grau JW, Huang YJ, Turtle JD, et al. When Pain Hurts: Nociceptive Stimulation Induces a State of Maladaptive Plasticity and Impairs Recovery after Spinal Cord Injury. J Neurotrauma. 2017;34(10):1873‐1890. doi:10.1089/neu.2016.4626
- Martin KK, Parvin S, Garraway SM. Peripheral Inflammation Accelerates the Onset of Mechanical Hypersensitivity after Spinal Cord Injury and Engages Tumor Necrosis Factor α Signaling Mechanisms. J Neurotrauma. 2019;36(12):2000‐2010. doi:10.1089/neu.2018.5953
- Garraway SM, Huie JR. Spinal Plasticity and Behavior: BDNF-Induced Neuromodulation in Uninjured and Injured Spinal Cord. Neural Plast. 2016;2016:9857201. doi:10.1155/2016/9857201
- Garraway SM, Woller SA, Huie JR, et al. Peripheral noxious stimulation reduces withdrawal threshold to mechanical stimuli after spinal cord injury: role of tumor necrosis factor alpha and apoptosis. Pain. 2014;155(11):2344‐2359. doi:10.1016/j.pain.2014.08.034
- Garraway SM, Turtle JD, Huie JR, et al. Intermittent noxious stimulation following spinal cord contusion injury impairs locomotor recovery and reduces spinal brain-derived neurotrophic factor-tropomyosin-receptor kinase signaling in adult rats. Neuroscience. 2011;199:86‐102. doi:10.1016/j.neuroscience.2011.10.007
- Garraway SM, Xu Q, Inturrisi CE. siRNA-mediated knockdown of the NR1 subunit gene of the NMDA receptor attenuates formalin-induced pain behaviors in adult rats. J Pain. 2009;10(4):380‐390. doi:10.1016/j.jpain.2008.09.013
- Garraway SM, Xu Q, Inturrisi CE. Design and evaluation of small interfering RNAs that target expression of the N-methyl-D-aspartate receptor NR1 subunit gene in the spinal cord dorsal horn. J Pharmacol Exp Ther. 2007;322(3):982‐988. doi:10.1124/jpet.107.123125
- Garraway SM, Petruska JC, Mendell LM. BDNF sensitizes the response of lamina II neurons to high threshold primary afferent inputs. Eur J Neurosci. 2003;18(9):2467‐2476. doi:10.1046/j.1460-9568.2003.02982.x
- Garraway SM, Hochman S. Modulatory actions of serotonin, norepinephrine, dopamine, and acetylcholine in spinal cord deep dorsal horn neurons. J Neurophysiol. 2001;86(5):2183‐2194. doi:10.1152/jn.2001.86.5.2183
- Garraway SM, Hochman S. Pharmacological characterization of serotonin receptor subtypes modulating primary afferent input to deep dorsal horn neurons in the neonatal rat. Br J Pharmacol. 2001;132(8):1789‐1798. doi:10.1038/sj.bjp.0703983
- Garraway SM, Pockett S, Hochman S. Primary afferent-evoked synaptic plasticity in deep dorsal horn neurons from neonatal rat spinal cord in vitro. Neurosci Lett. 1997;230(1):61‐64. doi:10.1016/s0304-3940(97)00475-8
