= Michael DiBerardinis =

Michael DiBerardinis is a former Philadelphia public official and current professor at the University of Pennsylvania's Fels Institute of Government.

DiBerardinis was born in Downingtown, Pennsylvania. After graduating from St. Joseph's University in 1971, he became a community organizer and housing activist in the Kensington neighborhood, where he helped organize 1000 families to occupy and renovate abandoned buildings; eventually more than 80% became legal homeowners. In 1991 he ran for Philadelphia City Council and after losing the election was appointed as Recreation Commissioner by Mayor Ed Rendell.

He was Managing Director under Mayor Jim Kenney from 2016 to 2018 and has also served as Philadelphia's Deputy Mayor for Environmental and Community Resources and Commissioner of the Department of Parks and Recreation, as Secretary of the Pennsylvania Department of Conservation and Natural Resources, as a trustee of Pennsylvania State University, and as a Daniel Rose Fellow at the Urban Land Institute .
