= Cold Spring Harbor Laboratory =

Private, non-profit research institution in US

- The logo of Cold Spring Harbor Laboratory
- Established: 1890; 136 years ago
- President: Bruce Stillman
- Staff: 1,200
- Budget: $150 million
- Location: 1 Bungtown Road, Laurel Hollow, New York, United States
- Website: www.cshl.edu
- Cold Spring Harbor Laboratory Historic District
- U.S. National Register of Historic Places
- U.S. Historic district
- Location within New York Location within the United States
- Interactive map of Cold Spring Harbor Laboratory Historic District
- Location: Jct. of NY 25A and Bungtown Rd., Laurel Hollow, New York
- Coordinates: 40°51′30″N 73°28′00″W
- Area: 110 acres (45 ha)
- Architect: Multiple
- Architectural style: Multiple
- NRHP reference No.: 94000198
- Added to NRHP: March 30, 1994

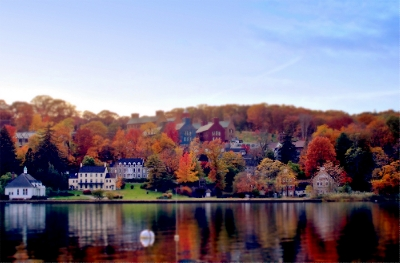
Cold Spring Harbor Laboratory

Cold Spring Harbor Laboratory (CSHL) is a private, non-profit institution with research programs focusing on cancer, neuroscience, botany, genomics, and quantitative biology. It is located in Laurel Hollow, New York, in Nassau County, on Long Island.

It is one of 68 institutions supported by the Cancer Centers Program of the U.S. National Cancer Institute (NCI) and has been an NCI-designated Cancer Center since 1987. The Laboratory is one of a handful of institutions that played a central role in the development of molecular genetics and molecular biology.

It has been home to eight scientists who have been awarded the Nobel Prize in Physiology or Medicine. CSHL is ranked among the leading basic research institutions in molecular biology and genetics, with Thomson Reuters ranking it first in the world. CSHL was also ranked first in research output worldwide by Nature. The Laboratory is led by Bruce Stillman, a biochemist and cancer researcher.

Since its inception in 1890, the institution's campus on the North Shore of Long Island has also been a center of biology education. Current CSHL educational programs serve professional scientists, doctoral students in biology, teachers of biology in the K–12 system, and students from the elementary grades through high school. In the past 10 years, CSHL conferences & courses have drawn over 81,000 scientists and students to the main campus. For this reason, many scientists consider CSHL a "crossroads of biological science." Since 2009 CSHL has partnered with the Suzhou Industrial Park in Suzhou, China, to create Cold Spring Harbor Asia which annually draws some 3,000 scientists to its meetings and courses. The Cold Spring Harbor Laboratory School of Biological Sciences, formerly the Watson School of Biological Sciences, was founded in 1999.

In 2015, CSHL announced a strategic affiliation with the nearby Northwell Health to advance cancer therapeutics research, develop a new clinical cancer research unit at Northwell Health in Lake Success, NY, to support early-phase clinical studies of new cancer therapies, and recruit and train more clinician-scientists in oncology.

CSHL hosts bioRxiv, a preprint repository for publications in the life sciences.

== Research programs ==
Research staff in CSHL's 52 laboratories numbers over 600, including postdoctoral researchers; an additional 125 graduate students and 500 administrative and support personnel bring the total number of employees to over 1,200.

Cell biology and genomics
RNA interference (RNAi) and small-RNA biology; DNA replication; RNA splicing; signal transduction; genome structure; non-coding RNAs; deep sequencing; single-cell sequencing and analytics; stem cell self-renewal and differentiation; chromatin dynamics; structural biology; advanced proteomics; mass spectrometry; advanced microscopy.

Cancer research
Principal cancer types under study: breast, prostate, blood (leukemia, lymphoma); myelodysplastic syndrome; melanoma; liver; ovarian and cervical; lung; brain; pancreas. Research foci: drug resistance; cancer genomics; tumor microenvironment; cancer metabolism; growth control in mammalian cells; transcriptional and post-transcriptional gene regulation.

Neuroscience
Stanley Institute for Cognitive Genomics employs deep sequencing and other tools to study genetics underlying schizophrenia, bipolar disorder, and major depression. Swartz Center for the Neural Mechanisms of Cognition studies cognition in the normal brain as a baseline for understanding dysfunction in psychiatric and neurodegenerative disorders. Other research foci: autism genetics; mapping of the mammalian brain; neural correlates of decision making.

Plant biology
Plant genome sequencing; epigenetics and stem cell fate; stem cell signalling; plant-environment interactions; using genetic insights to increase yield of staple crops, e.g. maize, rice, wheat; increase fruit yield in flowering plants, e.g. tomato. Other initiatives: genetics of aquatic plants for biofuel development; lead role in building National Science Foundation's iPlant Collaborative cyberinfrastructure. Much of this work takes place on 12 acres of farmland at the nearby CSHL Uplands Farm, where expert staff raise crops and Arabidopsis plants for studies. Seven CSHL faculty members conduct research primarily in plant biology - Drs. David Jackson, Zachary Lippman, Robert Martienssen, Richard McCombie, Ullas Pedmale, Doreen Ware, and Thomas Gingeras.

Simons Center for Quantitative Biology
Genome assembly and validation; mathematical modeling and algorithm development; population genetics; applied statistical and machine learning; biomedical text-mining; computational genomics; cloud computing and Big Data.

COVID-19

Scientists at Cold Spring Harbor Laboratory (CSHL), Utah Health University, PEEL Therapeutics, and Weill Cornell Medicine worked to examine the possible function of NETs in COVID-19, gather blood samples from 33 hospitalized individuals, as well as autopsy tissue. Neutrophil Extracellular Traps (NETs) are a form of protection which is utilized by the immune system against certain pathogens.

== Educational programs ==
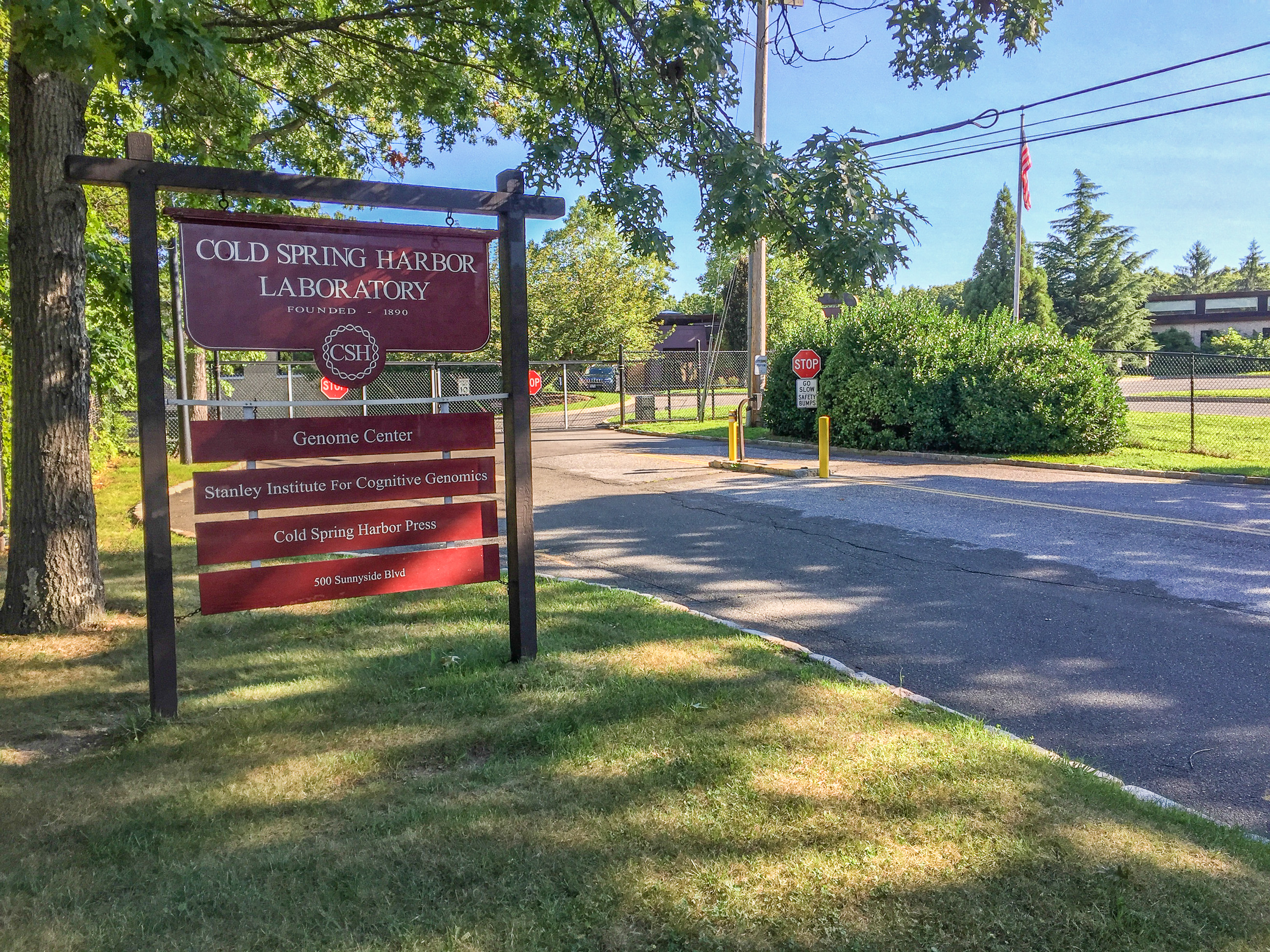
Sign at the entrance at 500 Sunnyside Blvd.

In addition to its research mission, CSHL has a broad educational mission. The School of Biological Sciences (SBS), established in 1998, awards the Ph.D. degree and fully funds the research program of every student. Students are challenged to obtain their doctoral degree in 4–5 years. The Undergraduate Research Program (URP) for gifted college students (established in 1959), and the Partners for the Future Program for advanced high school students (established in 1990) are now hosted at the SBS.

Cold Spring Harbor Laboratory also partners with nearby medical schools, including the Zucker School of Medicine at Hofstra/Northwell and the Renaissance School of Medicine at Stony Brook University, to train students in each school's M.D./Ph.D. dual-degree program. Students from each school may choose to complete their Ph.D. thesis at CSHL.

The CSHL Meetings & Courses Program brings over 8,500 scientists from around the world to Cold Spring Harbor annually to share research results – mostly unpublished—in 60 meetings, most held biannually; and to learn new technologies in 30 to 35 professional courses, most offered annually. The Cold Spring Harbor Symposium series, held every year since 1933 with the exception of three years during the Second World War, has been a forum for researchers in genetics, genomics, neuroscience and plant biology. At the Banbury Center, about 25–30 discussion-style meetings are held yearly for a limited number of invited participants. As of 2016, a two-week course at CSHL costs between $3,700 and $4,700 per student and three-day conferences cost about $1,000 per attendee.

The DNA Learning Center (DNALC), founded in 1988, was among the early pioneers in developing hands-on genetics lab experiences for middle and high school students. In 2013, 31,000 students on Long Island and New York City were taught genetics labs at the DNALC and satellite facilities in New York. Over 9,000 high school biology teachers have participated in DNALC teacher-training programs.

The Cold Spring Harbor Laboratory Press has established a program consisting of seven journals, 190 books, laboratory manuals and protocols, and online services for research preprints.

== Funding ==
In 2015, CSHL had an operating budget of $150 million, over $100 million of which was spent on research. Half of the research budget was devoted to cancer; 25% to neuroscience; 15% to genomics and quantitative biology; and 10% to plant sciences. The sources of research funding in 2015 were: 34% Federal (primarily National Institutes of Health and National Science Foundation); 26% auxiliary activities; 22% private philanthropy; 10% endowment; 3% corporate.

== History ==
The institution took root as The Biological Laboratory in 1890, a summer program for the education of college and high school teachers studying zoology, botany, comparative anatomy and nature. The program began as an initiative of Eugene G. Blackford and Franklin Hooper, director of the Brooklyn Institute of Arts and Sciences, the founding institution of The Brooklyn Museum. In 1904, the Carnegie Institution of Washington established the Station for Experimental Evolution at Cold Spring Harbor on an adjacent parcel. In 1921, the station was reorganized as the Carnegie Institution Department of Genetics.

Between 1910 and 1939, the laboratory was the base of the Eugenics Record Office of biologist Charles B. Davenport and his assistant Harry H. Laughlin, two prominent American eugenicists of the period. Davenport was director of the Carnegie Station from its inception until his retirement in 1934. In 1935 the Carnegie Institution sent a team to review the ERO's work, and as a result the ERO was ordered to stop all work. In 1939 the Institution withdrew funding for the ERO entirely, leading to its closure. The ERO's reports, articles, charts, and pedigrees were considered scientific facts in their day, but have since been discredited. Its closure came 15 years after its findings were incorporated into the National Origins Act (Immigration Act of 1924), which severely reduced the number of immigrants to America from southern and eastern Europe who, Harry Laughlin testified, were racially inferior to the Nordic immigrants from England and Germany. Charles Davenport was also the founder and the first director of the International Federation of Eugenics Organizations in 1925. Today, Cold Spring Harbor Laboratory maintains the full historical records, communications and artifacts of the ERO for historical, teaching and research purposes. The documents are housed in a campus archive and can be accessed online and in a series of multimedia websites.

Carnegie Institution scientists at Cold Spring Harbor made many contributions to genetics and medicine. In 1908 George H. Shull discovered hybrid corn and the genetic principle behind it called heterosis, or "hybrid vigor." This would become the foundation of modern agricultural genetics. In 1916, Clarence C. Little was among the first scientists to demonstrate a genetic component of cancer. E. Carleton MacDowell in 1928 discovered a strain of mouse called C58 that developed spontaneous leukemia – an early mouse model of cancer. In 1933, Oscar Riddle isolated prolactin, the milk secretion hormone and Wilbur Swingle participated in the discovery of adrenocortical hormone, used to treat Addison's disease.

Milislav Demerec was named director of the Laboratory in 1941. Demerec shifted the Laboratory's research focus to the genetics of microbes, thus setting investigators on a course to study the biochemical function of the gene. During World War Two, Demerec directed efforts at Cold Spring Harbor that resulted in major increases in penicillin production.

Beginning in 1941, and annually from 1945, three of the seminal figures of molecular genetics convened summer meetings at Cold Spring Harbor of what they called the Phage Group. Salvador Luria, of Indiana University; Max Delbrück, then of Vanderbilt University; and Alfred Hershey, then of Washington University in St. Louis, sought to discover the nature of genes through study of viruses called bacteriophages that infect bacteria.

- In 1945, Delbrück's famous Phage Course was taught for the first time, inspiring, among others, a young James D. Watson; it was repeated for many years after. CSH Symposia important in the cross-fertilization of ideas among molecular biology's pioneers were held in 1951, 1953, 1956, 1961, 1963, and 1966.
- At the CSH Symposium in summer 1953, Watson made the first public presentation of DNA's double-helix structure.

== Leadership ==
In 1962, the Department of Genetics, no longer supported by the Carnegie Institution of Washington, formally merged with the Biological Laboratory to form the Cold Spring Harbor Laboratory of Quantitative Biology. In 1970, the name was simplified to Cold Spring Harbor Laboratory.

John F. Cairns was appointed as the Director of the merged Cold Spring Harbor Laboratory in 1963 and found that in the absence of continued financial support from the Carnegie Institution of Washington, the newly created institution was in desperate need of funds to support its programs and update facilities. Cairns stabilized the Laboratory and made essential improvements to the facilities. He decided in 1968 that he would step down as Director and he remained at CSHL until 1973, moving then to the Imperial Cancer Research Fund (now Cancer Research UK) in Mill Hill near London, UK. While at CSHL, Cairns performed important experiments on DNA replication in the bacteria E. coli.

James D. Watson served as the Laboratory's director and president for 35 years. Upon taking charge in 1968, he focused the Laboratory on cancer research, creating a tumor virus group and successfully obtaining federal funds for an expansion of cancer research capabilities. Watson placed CSHL on a firm financial footing. Inspired by his Nobel collaborator, Francis Crick, Watson initiated a major push to scale-up CSHL research on the brain and psychiatric disorders, beginning in the late 1980s. In 1990, work was completed on the Arnold and Mabel Beckman Laboratory, and the Marks Neuroscience Building was opened in 1999. In 1994, Watson ceased being director of the Laboratory and assumed the title of president. In 2004 he was named chancellor, a position he held until October 2007, when he retired at the age of 79 after views attributed to him on race and intelligence appeared in the British press. In January 2019, CSHL severed all ties with Watson—and revoked his honorary titles—after he unequivocally restated these views in an American Masters television profile.

Since 1994 biochemist and cancer biologist Bruce Stillman has led the Laboratory as director, and since 2003 as president. Stillman, a member of the National Academy of Sciences and a Fellow of the Royal Society, also continues to run a basic research lab, devoted to the study of DNA replication and chromosome maintenance. Stillman is credited with the 1991 discovery and elucidation of the mechanism of the Origin Recognition Complex (ORC), a highly conserved protein complex that recognizes and binds to specific DNA sequences, marking starting points for replication of the entire genome.

Stillman has presided over a major expansion of the Laboratory, its size growing threefold since he became director. With construction completed on six linked laboratory buildings on the Hillside Campus in 2009, CSHL added new laboratory space for cancer and neuroscience research, as well as space for a new program on quantitative biology to bring experts in mathematics, computer science, statistics, and physics to problems in biology.

== Notable faculty ==
- Douglas Fearon, immunologist, Fellow of the Royal Society, member of the National Academy of Sciences.
- Leemor Joshua-Tor, structural biologist, Howard Hughes Medical Institute investigator, and National Academy of Sciences member.
- Adrian R. Krainer, developed nusinersen to treat spinal muscular atrophy (SMA), winner of the Breakthrough Prize in Life Sciences and member of the National Academy of Sciences.
- Robert Martienssen, studies epigenetics, Howard Hughes Medical Institute investigator and Fellow of the Royal Society (FRS).
- Bruce Stillman, molecular biologist, Fellow of the Royal Society, Member of the National Academy of Sciences, EMBO and AAAS.
- Bruce Wallace, geneticist, Member of the National Academy of Sciences, professor at Virginia Tech
- Michael Wigler, genetic engineering of animal cells and molecular biologist, co-discovered the Ras oncogene, Member of the National Academy of Sciences and AAAS.
- Zachary Lippman, plant geneticist, Howard Hughes Medical Institute investigator and winner of a MacArthur Fellowship, commonly referred to as a "Genius grant", Member of the National Academy of Sciences.
- Christopher Vakoc, leukemia biologist, winner of the Paul Marks Prize for Cancer Research.

=== Nobel Prize winners ===
- Carol Greider, discovered relationship between cellular aging and damage to the ends of chromosomes, called telomeres, in 1992; won Nobel Prize in 2009 with Elizabeth Blackburn and Jack W. Szostak
- Barbara McClintock, discovered transposons ("jumping genes") in 1944; received Nobel Prize in 1983.
- Martha Chase and Alfred Hershey, conducted "Waring blender experiments", confirmed DNA as the genetic material in 1952; Hershey was awarded the Nobel Prize with Salvador Luria and Max Delbrück in 1969
- Richard J. Roberts and Phillip A. Sharp shared a Nobel in 1993 for the discovery of discontinuous, or "split" genes, which revealed the RNA splicing mechanism.
- James D. Watson, shared a Nobel Prize with Francis Crick and Maurice Wilkins in 1962 for their discovery of the double helix structure of DNA. From 1968 to 1993 Watson served as the CSHL Director. In 2007 the CSHL suspended him for his support for scientific racism but after he issued a public apology he was allowed to retain honorary titles, though he was relieved of his leadership and managerial roles. In 2019 CSHL rescinded his honorary titles after he made public remarks again suggesting IQ and race were related, comments which CSHL viewed as a reversal of the apology he gave in 2007. In 2020 the Watson School of Biological Sciences (WSBS) was renamed to delete any reference to him.

== Double Helix Medal ==
Each year, Cold Spring Harbor Laboratory awards a Double Helix Medal to individuals who have positively impacted human health, either by raising awareness and funds for biomedical research, or contributing in a major way to biological and biomedical research.

== See also ==
- Salk Institute for Biological Studies
- Whitehead Institute
- Massachusetts Institute of Technology
- Harvard University
- Rockefeller University
- California Institute of Technology
- The Scripps Research Institute
