= Thomas J. Kelly (scientist) =

American biologist

- Born: 1941
- Education: Johns Hopkins University
- Awards: Louisa Gross Horwitz Prize of Columbia University Alfred P. Sloan, Jr. Prize of the General Motors Cancer Research Foundation.
- Scientific career
- Fields: Molecular biology, biochemistry
- Workplaces: Sloan-Kettering Institute for Cancer Research, Memorial Sloan-Kettering Cancer Center

Thomas J. Kelly is an American cancer researcher whose work focuses on the molecular mechanisms of DNA replication. Kelly is director of the Sloan-Kettering Institute, the basic research arm of the Memorial Sloan-Kettering Cancer Center. He holds the Center's Benno C. Schmidt Chair of Cancer Research.

Before joining Sloan-Kettering in 2002, Kelly was professor and director of the Department of Molecular Biology and Genetics at the Johns Hopkins University School of Medicine and was the founding director of the Johns Hopkins Institute for Basic Biomedical Sciences.

Kelly pioneered the study of DNA replication in eukaryotic cells by using DNA viruses as model systems. His laboratory developed the first cell-free systems for studying the biochemistry of DNA replication in human cells, enabling the identification and functional characterization of components of the human replication machinery.

In recognition of this work he received the 2004 Alfred P. Sloan, Jr. Prize of the General Motors Cancer Research Foundation and the 2010 Louisa Gross Horwitz Prize of Columbia University.

== Career ==
Kelly earned a Ph.D. in biophysics in 1968 and an M.D. in 1969. While a postdoctoral fellow with Hamilton O. Smith at the Johns Hopkins University School of Medicine during 1969-70, Kelly determined the DNA sequences recognized by type II restriction enzymes, which subsequently became major tools in recombinant DNA research. In 1970 he moved to the National Institutes of Health as a member of the United States Public Health Service and conducted research on the DNA viruses, adenovirus and SV40, which cause tumors in animals. He joined the faculty in the Department of Microbiology at the Johns Hopkins University School of Medicine in 1972, where he began to exploit viruses as potentially powerful model systems for exploring the mechanisms of DNA replication in human cells.

Using proteins derived from human cells, he and his colleagues developed the first cell-free DNA replication systems capable of duplicating the complete genomes of adenovirus and SV40. The SV40 system proved to be a particularly useful system because SV40 relies largely on the cellular replication machinery for the duplication of its genome. Thus, biochemical analysis of the SV40 system made it possible to identify and functionally characterize proteins and enzymes that carry out the duplication of the chromosomal DNA in human cells. In subsequent work Kelly and colleagues have shifted their focus from studying the machinery of DNA replication to the mechanism that controls it. Studying these mechanisms are essential for ensuring the accuracy of DNA replication during the cell cycle in human cells and in fission yeast (Schizosaccharomyces pombe), which is highly significant in understanding cancer.

Since 2002, Kelly has been the director of the Sloan-Kettering Institute, where he has expanded or re-invigorated some of its laboratory research programs. Kelly also led the establishment of the Gerstner Sloan-Kettering Graduate School of Biomedical Sciences, which provides a novel curriculum in basic and translational cancer biology leading to the Ph.D. degree.

== Honors ==
- Member, Institute of Medicine
- Member, National Academy of Sciences
- Member, American Philosophical Society
- Fellow, American Academy of Arts and Sciences
- Fellow, American Association for the Advancement of Science
- Fellow, American Academy of Microbiology
- Member, Johns Hopkins Society of Scholars

== Awards ==
- Louisa Gross Horwitz Prize of Columbia University, 2010
- Alfred P. Sloan, Jr. Prize of the General Motors Cancer Research Foundation, 2004
