= Rosetta DeBerardinis =

American artist

- Born: New York City, NY
- Education: Vassar College, University of the District of Columbia, University of Baltimore School of Law, London School for Social Research, Rice University, and the Fashion Institute of Technology
- Occupation: Artist
- Known for: Abstract painting
- Website: www.rosettadeberardinis.com

Rosetta DeBerardinis is an American artist (born in New York) currently working out of New York City.

== Education ==
She is a graduate of Vassar College and holds advanced degrees from the University of the District of Columbia, the University of Baltimore School of Law, and also studied at the London School for Social Research, Rice University, and the Fashion Institute of Technology.

== Awards ==
DeBerardinis has been granted multiple awards by the District of Columbia Commission on the Arts and Humanities and by Liquitex, a manufacturer of professional art materials.

== Artwork ==
DeBerardinis is an abstract painter with works as large as nine feet, and three-dimensional pieces which incorporate recycled materials. Her artwork has been exhibited nationally and internationally in museums, galleries, universities, and art venues and is included in both public and private collections. Her work has been exhibited at The Corcoran Gallery of Art, Hampton University Museum, the Dallas Women’s Museum, the City Museum of Varaždin, Croatia, The Museum of Latin American Art, the Noyes Museum, the African American Museum of Dallas, and the Islip Museum.

She notes about her own work:

"There is no representational narrative. I aim to achieve subtle reaction and to evoke some emotional or visual response. The viewer is not expected to see what I see, but to use the work as a source for their individual perception based upon their personal filters be it the heart, soul, brain or their eye. Each painting requires laying and interlocking materials. The work begins and ends with a dance. There is no sound in the studio. The creative process writes the tempo and is the only beat. I watch the pigment spread, drip, melding, expand and shrink, then merge and part again repeating until dry-forever changing."

In 2003, she was nominated by art historian Barbara Rose, David Rubin and other jurors to represent the United States as a lifetime member on its team for the Florence, Italy Biennale.

== Collections ==
DeBerardinis' work is held in the following permanent collections:

- Collection of the City of Washington, DC
- Black Mountain College Museum

•PNC Bank Permanent Collection

•Marriott Marquis Hotel Permanent Collection

== Public installations ==
- 1998 A Ticket to the Past, Verizon Center, Washington, DC
- 2008 Tile Installation, Kanoria Centre for the Arts, Ahmedabad, India
- 2008 Tile Installation, Chiang Mai International Airport, Beijing China
- 2008 Row House Project, Historic Main Street, Baltimore, MD
- 2009 Art on Call, Department of Tourism, Washington, DC
- 2017 The Connective Project: Prospect Park, Brooklyn, NY

== Awards ==
- 2009 Liquitex Artist of the Month (January) Award
- 2007-09 Residency, School 33 Art Center, Baltimore, MD
- 2010-01 Residency, Zenith Community Art Center, Washington, DC
- 2013 DC Art Bank Collection Grant, DC Commission on the Arts and Humanities
- 2014 DC Art Bank Collection Grant, DC Commission on the Arts and Humanities
- 2016 “Celebrating the Genius of Women”: Recognition Award, Women in the Arts, Inc.
