= Christopher Vakoc =

Molecular biologist

Christopher Vakoc is a molecular biologist and a professor at Cold Spring Harbor Laboratory.

== Education ==
Vakoc graduated with a degree in Biochemistry from Pennsylvania State University in 2001. He then attained his M.D. and his Ph.D. from the University of Pennsylvania. His PhD research was performed with Gerd Blobel on the regulation of gene expression during hematopoiesis. In 2008, he established his own independent research group at Cold Spring Harbor Laboratory.

== Career and research ==
Vakoc uses CRISPR/Cas9 technology to probe the epigenetic regulation of cancer and to identify new cancer drug targets. In 2011, Vakoc discovered that the epigenetic protein BRD4 was particularly important for leukemia, leading to a series of clinical trials with a new drug, JQ1. By studying cancer epigenetics, Vakoc has also identified a new subtype of lung cancer and has discovered how gene expression changes affect metastasis in pancreatic cancer.

Recently, Vakoc has developed a CRISPR screening approach to identify the protein domains that are most important for cancer growth.

== Awards and honors ==
- American Association for Cancer Research Outstanding Achievement Award, 2015
- Pershing Square Sohn Cancer Research Alliance Prize, 2016
- Paul Marks Prize for Cancer Research, 2019
