= Annie Marie Garraway =

American mathematician (born 1940)

- Born: Annie Marie Watkins; 1940 (age 85–86); Parsons, Kansas
- Education: Northwestern University, University of California at Berkeley
- Occupation: Mathematician. philanthropist
- Spouse(s): Michael Garraway (m. 1965), Ira W. Deep
- Children: 3, including Levi Garraway
- Parents: Levi Watkins (1911–1994) (father); Lillian Bernice Varnado (1917–2013) (mother)
- Relatives: Levi Watkins (brother)

Annie Marie Garraway (née Watkins; born 1940) is an American mathematician who worked in telecommunications and electronic data transmission. She is also a philanthropist.

== Biography ==
Garraway was born Annie Marie Watkins in Parsons, Kansas, the oldest daughter of Levi Watkins (1911–1994) and Lillian Bernice Varnado (1917–2013) who met when they were both high school teachers.

Annie Marie attended Booker T. Washington High School and then enrolled in S. A. Owen Junior College, which her father had founded and served as the first president. As a freshman in 1957, she intended to major in engineering, but a math teacher at Owen, Juanita R. Turner, suggested that Annie Marie consider a different course of study. As Garraway recalled later, Turner taught math full-time at Manassas High School while also teaching college algebra at the junior college.

She recognized I had a talent for math. She had me stay after class to do more math exercises. She did this even though she had spent a full work day at Manassas. ... As a result of her working with me, I never had trouble with math.

In 1959, her family moved to Montgomery, Alabama where her father was an administrator and then the sixth president of Alabama State College, a historically black college, from 1962 to 1983. That college is known today as Alabama State University (ASU).

Garraway continued her studies at Northwestern University in Evanston, Illinois where she earned a B.S. and M.S. in mathematics. In 1967, she completed a Ph.D. in math from University of California at Berkeley with her dissertation titled Structure of some cocycles in analysis.

She had a successful career at AT&T Labs and its spinoff company, Lucent Technologies.

According to one of her brothers, "Her pioneering mathematical algorithms and inventions for Bell Laboratories and Lucent Technologies paved the way for the modern era of telecommunications and the electronic transmission of data around the world."

She married Michael Oliver Garraway in 1965. In 2004, she married Ira W. Deep, Jr., professor emeritus at The Ohio State University and the first chair of the university's Department of Plant Pathology. Her three children together (including Levi Garraway) have earned three doctorates and two medical degrees.

== Philanthropy ==
=== Vanderbilt University ===
Garraway's 2017 gift to Vanderbilt, was made in honor of her brother Levi Watkins Jr. who died in 2015, for "his transformative leadership and service, his historical medical inquiry and the tremendous imprint he left on students and faculty at Vanderbilt University School of Medicine (VUSM). He was the first African-American to graduate from the university's school of medicine as a member of the Class of 1970. According to the school, "When Watkins walked through the doors of VUSM in 1966, he broke new ground by becoming the school's first African-American student. When he graduated four years later after being elected into the Alpha Omega Alpha (AOA) medical honor society, he was still the only one."

=== Johns Hopkins University ===
In 2019, Garraway created a scholarship at Johns Hopkins, also in memory of her brother, Levi Watkins Jr. who was the first African American to become the university's chief resident in cardiac surgery. In 1979, he established Hopkins' national recruiting program for medical students of color and in 1980, he implanted the first automatic heart defibrillator at Hopkins.

=== LeMoyne-Owen College ===
Garraway's 2020 gift to LeMoyne-Owen college was inspired by the movie and book, Hidden Figures, which describes the true story of three African-American female mathematicians working at NASA as human computers, who played a critical role in the 1960s U.S. space efforts. "Seeing the movie and reading the book made me think that she (Mrs. Turner) saw hidden figures in me," Garraway said.

According to Garraway, after watching the film she made plans to create an endowed scholarship fund at LeMoyne-Owen College, a historically black college in Memphis, that now includes the institution formerly known as S.A. Owen Junior College.

The resulting Juanita R. Turner Memorial Scholarship is named for the junior college math professor who had made an extra effort in 1957 to tutor Garraway in math. Little is known of Turner except that when she was attending Grant Elementary School, she was the youngest winner of the citywide spelling contest (for African-American students) in 1927. She earned a master's of science degree in mathematics from the University of Illinois Urbana-Champaign.

== Publications ==
- Garraway, Annie Marie Watkins (1967). Structure of some cocycles in analysis. Berkeley, California: University of California. OCLC 952184806.
