= Agnes Blake =

First woman agent for British foreign espionage organisation MI6

Agnes Blake was the first woman agent of MI6, active from 1909 to 1910.

== Personal life and family ==
Agnes Joyce Garraway was born on 31 May 1858. She was from the Garraway family that had become wealthy through sugar plantations worked by enslaved Africans in Dominica in the 1800s. She was married for eleven years until her husband died. An older sister had married into the Falkenstein family of German aristocrats and her brother-in-law became an equerry to Kaiser Wilhelm II, the German Emperor. Blake was well-connected and established herself as a translator of German. This enabled her to translate and adapt plays in the 1920s such as The King, Lola or the thought and speech of animals and Fra Angelico, some of which were performed in London. She was also an inventor and had a patent awarded in 1893 for a puzzle.

== Espionage career ==
Blake was the first woman to act as an agent for MI6, starting in December 1909. At the time she was in her fifties. Her language skills, family connection to Germany and position in society made her suggested by Charles Larcom Graves, the well-connected 'Punch' magazine satirist to Charles Hardinge, Permanent Under-Secretary at the Foreign Office during the foundation of MI6. She was known as 'Agent A'.

She met with Mansfield Smith-Cumming, the first head of MI6. He considered that she was not likely to be able to obtain any useful information. However, she provided a list of German military officers, both active and retired, and specific information about one after she had visited Germany. She also wrote telegrams and letters in German for Smith-Cumming. Her salary was reduced to £100 annually from 1910, which did not cover her expenses. She complained in writing via Graves and to her surprise, Smith-Cumming ended her employment. Smith-Cumming offered to re-employ her but she did not agree to the terms. After further intervention via Graves, she was offered £58 10s as a final settlement in November 1910, and she was content as her espionage career ended.

Blake died in 1950.
