= Levi Garraway =

American oncologist (born 1968)

- Born: 1968 (age 57–58); Oakland, California, US
- Occupation: Oncologist
- Title: Chief Medical Officer at Roche Holding AG
- Spouse: Gisele
- Children: 2
- Parent(s): Annie Marie Watkins Garraway; Michael Garraway (died 1999)
- Relatives: Levi Watkins (uncle)

Academic background
- Education: Harvard College (AB); Harvard Medical School (MD, PhD)

Levi A. Garraway (born 1968) is an American oncologist. His research team was among the first to adapt genomics technologies to enable scalable, high-throughput clinical approaches to cancer gene mutation profiling. As a result, he was inducted into the American Society for Clinical Investigation, American Association for Cancer Research, and National Academy of Medicine.

== Early life and education ==
Garraway was born to parents Annie Marie (née Watkins) and Michael Oliver Garraway in Oakland, California. His mother earned a Ph.D. in mathematics and became a department chair at AT&T Bell Labs. As well, his uncle Levi Watkins was the first African-American student admitted to and graduate from Vanderbilt University School of Medicine. His father, an émigré from the Caribbean and relative of the Garraway family of Dominica who own Garraway Hotel, was also a professor of plant biology at Ohio State University. While Garraway was in high school, he hung around the university lab and helped his father with experiments.

Garraway received his A.B. in biochemical sciences from Harvard College and his medical degree and Ph.D. from Harvard Medical School. He then completed his internship and residency in internal medicine at the Massachusetts General Hospital and his fellowship training in medical oncology at the Dana–Farber Cancer Institute. His choice to pursue a medical degree on top of his PhD was the result of his academic family, specifically his uncle.

== Career ==
Upon completing his fellowship, Garraway became an associate member of the Broad Institute and an assistant professor in the Department of Medical Oncology at the Dana–Farber Cancer Institute. At Broad Institute, Garraway's research involved the systematic characterization of critical and targetable mechanisms enacted by common genomic alterations in human tumors. His research team was among the first to adapt genomics technologies to enable scalable, high-throughput clinical approaches to cancer gene mutation profiling. In 2007, Garraway and Matthew Meyerson published a paper detailing a method for large-panel testing of 238 DNA mutations. This led to the establishment of Foundation Medicine. As a result of his discovery, Garraway was eleceted a member of the American Society for Clinical Investigation in 2009.

During his tenure at the Broad Institute, Garraway also became the co-leader of the Cancer Genetics Program at Dana-Farber/Harvard Cancer Center and an associate professor at Dana–Farber Cancer Institute and Harvard Medical School. In 2012, Garraway was a recipient of the Paul Marks Prize for Cancer Research from the Memorial Sloan-Kettering Cancer Center as a "promising scientist under the age of 45 in recognition of his contributions to cancer research." He also earned the 19th annual Herbert and Maxine Block Memorial Lectureship Award for Achievement in Cancer.

On September 14, 2016, Garraway was appointed the Senior Vice President of Global Oncology at Eli Lilly and Company, succeeding Richard Gaynor. In October 2019, Garraway started his new leadership role as Roche Holding AG's Chief Medical Officer. He was also elected to the American Association for Cancer Research for "visionary contributions to the establishment of genomics-driven precision cancer medicine by pioneering high-throughput adaptation of genomic technologies to profile human tumors to identify actionable cancer gene mutations, allowing for precise patient population stratification."

During the COVID-19 pandemic, Garraway was elected a member of the National Academy of Medicine "for the discovery of genetic drivers of melanoma, prostate cancer, and other malignancies, the discovery of mechanisms of response and resistance to anticancer therapies in melanoma and other cancer types, pioneering platforms and approaches to cancer precision medicine, and incorporating precision medicine principles in therapeutic development."

== Personal life ==
Garraway and his wife Gisele have two children together; a son and a daughter. As of 2007, his younger sister Isla is a urologist and surgeon at University of California, Los Angeles's Jonsson Comprehensive Cancer Center.
