= Craig B. Thompson =

American cell biologist and cancer researcher

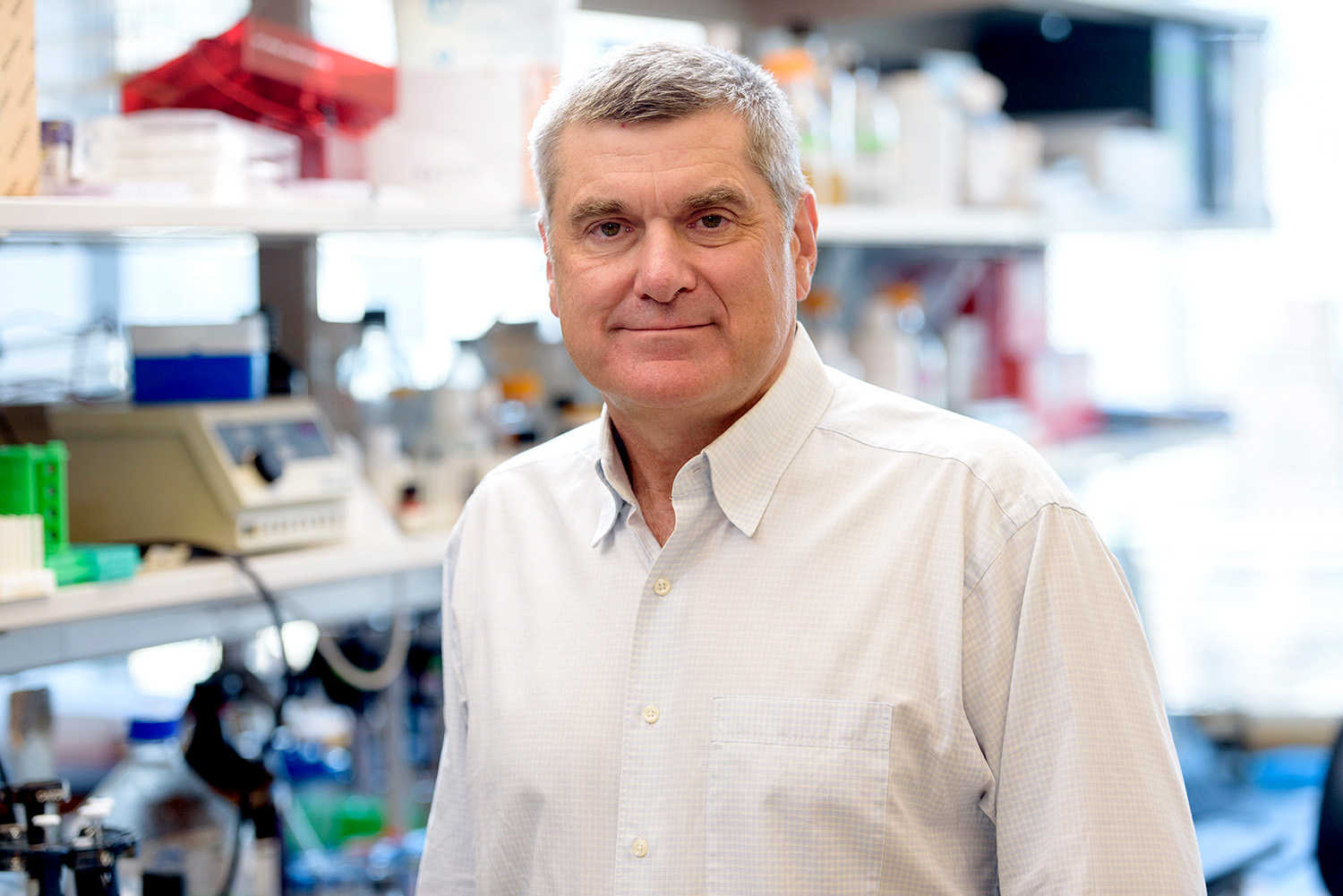
- Born: 1953 (age 72–73)
- Education: Dartmouth College; University of Pennsylvania Medical School
- Spouse: Tullia Lindsten
- Scientific career
- Workplaces: Memorial Sloan Kettering Cancer Center; University of Pennsylvania; Uniformed Services University of the Health Sciences; University of Michigan; University of Chicago
- Website: The Craig Thompson Lab

Craig B. Thompson (born 1953) is an American cell biologist and a former president of the Memorial Sloan Kettering Cancer Center.

== Education and career ==
Thompson received his bachelor's degree from Dartmouth College and went on to earn his medical degree in 1977 from the University of Pennsylvania Medical School. He received clinical training in internal medicine at Harvard Medical School and in medical oncology at the Fred Hutchinson Cancer Research Center at the University of Washington. After completing his training, Thompson became a physician at the National Naval Medical Center in Bethesda, Maryland, and an assistant professor of medicine at the Uniformed Services University of the Health Sciences. In 1987, he joined the faculty of the University of Michigan as an assistant professor of medicine and an assistant investigator in the Howard Hughes Medical Institute. From 1993 until he joined the University of Pennsylvania, he was affiliated with the University of Chicago, where he was professor of medicine, a Howard Hughes investigator, and director of the Gwen Knapp Center for Lupus and Immunology Research.

Thompson joined the University of Pennsylvania in 1999 as a professor of medicine, the scientific director of The Leonard and Madlyn Abramson Family Cancer Research Institute, and the first chairman of the Department of Cancer Biology. In 2006 he was named director of the Abramson Cancer Center of the University of Pennsylvania and associate vice president for cancer services of the University of Pennsylvania Health System.

Thompson became president and chief executive officer of Memorial Sloan Kettering Cancer Center in November 2010.

He is married to Tullia Lindsten, also a cancer researcher.

== Research ==
Thompson's laboratory undertakes basic research in the fields of cancer biology and immunology. This research has helped advance the understanding and deployment of immunotherapy to treat cancer. Thompson has studied how genes regulate apoptosis and metabolism, and investigated their application in treating cancer.

In his earlier work, Thompson was among the first to describe the unique co-stimulatory properties of CD28 in augmenting lymphoid effector function, proliferation, and survival. Thompson identified the evolutionary duplication of CD28 into CD28 and CTLA-4 and demonstrated that CTLA4 had an inhibitory effect on immune activation.

Thompson elucidated processes on the genes that control programmed cell death or apoptosis. These processes shape lymphocyte development and immune system homeostasis. His group discovered the first Bcl-2 homolog to be identified, Bcl-Xl, and described the first BH3-only containing regulatory family member, Bcl-xS. He published this work alongside Stanley Korsmeyer's report of the first pro-apoptotic family member, Bax, and together established the three classes of this gene family and defined their pro-apoptotic and anti-apoptotic roles.

Thompson's recent research has focused on cellular metabolism. His discoveries in growth factor regulation of nutrient uptake and metabolism have provided direct mechanistic links between cellular metabolism and cell growth and survival. His work has also led to new insights into how intracellular metabolite levels can contribute to the regulation of gene expression, cellular differentiation and oncogenic transformation. This work has contributed to the resurgent interest in cancer cell metabolism and may form the basis for translational therapies to exploit the metabolic addictions exhibited by cancer cells.

== Scientific contributions and patents ==
Thompson holds more than 30 patents related to immunotherapy and apoptosis, and is a founder of three biotechnology companies.

Patents arising from Thompson's research describing the co-stimulatory/inhibitory properties of CD28/CTLA-4, in collaboration with Carl June and Jeffrey Bluestone, were licensed for the development of Abatacept (Orencia) for autoimmune diseases and for use in T cell cloning and CAR T cell production.

Thompson's work with Stanley Korsmeyer establishing the existence of three classes of Bcl-2-related proteins and defining their role in apoptosis led to the development of ABT-263 (navitoclax) and ABT-199 (venetoclax), recently FDA-approved for certain patients with chronic lymphocytic leukemia (CLL).

Thompson's discovery of oncogenic metabolites (succinate, fumarate, and 2-hydroxyglutarate) that can inhibit tumor suppressor function and/or impair cellular differentiation has helped lead to the development of new treatments for leukemia, gliomas, sarcomas, and bladder cancer, currently in clinical trials.

== Criticism ==
In December 2011, The University and its Abramson Family Cancer Research Institute sued Thompson after his move to Memorial Sloan Kettering, charging that he had made use of research conducted at the University of Pennsylvania to start a biotechnology company, Agios Pharmaceuticals that Thompson had co-founded in 2007 while still at the University.

While most of the details were not announced, the suit was settled with an agreement wherein Agios entered into a licensing agreement with the University of Pennsylvania regarding specific intellectual property.

== Other roles ==
- Member, Medical Advisory Board of the Howard Hughes Medical Institute
- Member, Lasker Award Jury
- Associate Editor of Cell, Immunity, and Cancer Cell
- Scientific Editor, Cancer Discovery

=== Past roles ===
- Member, board of directors of the American Association for Cancer Research (2009-2012)
- Chairman, scientific advisory board of the Damon Runyon/Walter Winchell Cancer Foundation
- Chairman, Board of Scientific Counselors of the National Cancer Institute (2001-2003)
- Chairman, medical advisory board of the Howard Hughes Medical Institute

== Awards and honors ==
- Ernst W. Bertner Memorial Award (2017)
- Drexel Prize in Cancer Biology (2014)
- The American College of Physicians Award for Medical Science (2011)
- Steven C. Beering Award for Medical Research (2011)
- Katherine Berkan Judd Award (2010)
- Member, National Academy of Sciences (2005)
- Stanley N. Cohen Biomedical Research Award (2004)
- ASCI Award from the American Society for Clinical Investigation (2003)
- Member, National Academy of Medicine (2002)
- Fellow, American Academy of Arts and Sciences (1999)
- Member, American Society for Clinical Investigation (1989)
- Member, Association of American Physicians
