= AACR Awards =

The American Association for Cancer Research gives several annual awards for significant contributions to the field of cancer research.

== AACR Award for Lifetime Achievement in Cancer Research ==
This award recognizes prodigious scientists that have made profound contributions to the field of cancer research.

- 2020: Phillip Allen Sharp
- 2019: Emil J. Freireich
- 2018: Joseph R. Bertino
- 2017: Mina Bissell
- 2016: Robert A. Weinberg
- 2015: Mario R. Capecchi
- 2014: Douglas Hanahan
- 2013: Harold L. Moses
- 2012: Beatrice Mintz
- 2011: Susan Band Horwitz
- 2010: Janet D. Rowley
- 2009: Joseph F. Fraumeni, Jr.
- 2008: Harald zur Hausen
- 2007: Donald Metcalf
- 2006: Bernard Fisher
- 2005: Alfred G. Knudson, Jr.
- 2004: Emil Frei III

== AACR Award for Outstanding Achievement in Cancer Research ==
This award recognizes the outstanding research of investigators under the age of 40.

- This award has not been given since 2016.
- 2016: Franziska Michor
- 2015: Christopher R. Vakoc
- 2014: Nima Sharifi
- 2013: Roger S. Lo
- 2012: Yibin Kang
- 2011: Nathanael S. Gray
- 2010: Joshua T. Mendell
- 2009: Victor Velculescu
- 2008: Arul Chinnaiyan
- 2007: Kornelia Polyak
- 2006: Ivan Dikic
- 2005: Gregory J. Hannon
- 2004: Xiaodong Wang
- 2003: none
- 2002: Todd R. Golub
- 2001: Scott W. Lowe
- 2000: Nikola P. Pavletich
- 1999: John Kuriyan
- 1998: Michael C. Dean
- 1997: Tyler Jacks
- 1996: Carol W. Greider
- 1995: Eric S. Lander
- 1994: Igor B. Roninson
- 1993: Tom Curran
- 1992: Elizabeth Robertson
- 1991: Richard C. Mulligan
- 1990: Ronald M. Evans
- 1989: Bert Vogelstein
- 1988: Webster K. Cavenee
- 1987: Peter M. Blumberg
- 1986: Mariano Barbacid
- 1985: Lance A. Liotta
- 1984: Charles D. Stiles
- 1983: Susan Astrin
- 1982: Stuart A. Aaronson
- 1981: Yung-Chi Cheng
- 1980: Malcolm A. S. Moore

== AACR Joseph H. Burchenal Memorial Award for Outstanding Achievement in Clinical Cancer Research ==
This award is given for achievements in clinical research.

- 2019: Susan L. Cohn
- 2018: Johann S. de Bono
- 2017: Judy E. Garber
- 2016: John C. Byrd
- 2015: Elizabeth M. Jaffee
- 2014: John F. DiPersio
- 2013: Hagop M. Kantarjian
- 2012: Lawrence H. Einhorn
- 2011: Ching-Hon Pui
- 2010: Henry T. Lynch
- 2009: W. Marston Linehan
- 2008: Joseph R. Bertino
- 2007: Kenneth C. Anderson
- 2006: Merrill J. Egorin
- 2005: Jimmie C. Holland
- 2004: Clara D. Bloomfield
- 2003: David S. Alberts
- 2002: Lee M. Nadler
- 2001: Rainer F. Storb
- 2000: Waun Ki Hong
- 1999: John Mendelsohn
- 1998: Bernard Fisher
- 1997: Ronald Levy
- 1996: Samuel A. Wells Jr.

== AACR-CRI Lloyd J. Old Award in Cancer Immunology ==
This award is given for major contributions to the field of cancer immunology.

- 2018: Antoni Ribas
- 2017: Olivera Finn
- 2016: Ronald Levy
- 2015: Carl H. June
- 2014: Robert D. Schreiber
- 2013: James P. Allison

== AACR-Prevent Cancer Foundation Award for Excellence in Cancer Prevention Research ==
This award is given to scientists for have made significant discoveries in cancer prevention.

- 2014: Graham A. Colditz
- 2013: John P. Pierce
- 2012: Jack Cuzick
- 2011: Andrew J. Dannenberg
- 2010: John D. Groopman
- 2009: Mark W. Schiffman
- 2008: Frank L. Meyskens, Jr.
- 2007: Leslie Bernstein
- 2006: Stephen S. Hecht
- 2005: Scott M. Lippman
- 2004: David S. Alberts
- 2003: Waun Ki Hong

== AACR Princess Takamatsu Memorial Lectureship ==
This award recognizes successful scientists dedicated to international collaborations.

- 2018: Lisa M. Coussens
- 2017: Louis M. Staudt
- 2016: William G. Kaelin Jr.
- 2015: Lewis C. Cantley
- 2014: Rakesh K. Jain
- 2013: Carlo M. Croce
- 2012: Mary J.C. Hendrix
- 2011: Philip Hanawalt
- 2010: Mary-Claire King
- 2009: Curtis C. Harris
- 2008: Lawrence A. Loeb
- 2007: Webster K. Cavenee
- 2002: Michael B. Sporn

== AACR Team Science Award ==
This award is given to promote collaboration to further breakthroughs in cancer research.

- 2018: **Genomic Approaches to Preventing and Treating Asian-Prevalent Cancers Team**"

Patrick Tan, Steven G. Rozen, Sen-Yung Hsieh, Chiea Chuen Khor, Narong Khuntikeo, Soon Thye Lim, Choon Kiat Ong, Chawalit Pairojkul, See-Tong Pang, Tatsuhiro Shibata, Bin Tean Teh

- 2017: **International Liquid Biopsy Initiative Team**"

Luis A. Diaz, Nishant Agrawal, Chetan Bettegowda, Frank Diehl, Peter Gibbs, Stanley R. Hamilton, Ralph H. Hruban, Hartmut Juhl, Isaac Kinde, Kenneth Kinzler, Martin Nowak, Nickolas Papadopoulos, David Sidransky, Jeanne Tie, Victor E. Velculescu, Bert Vogelstein

- 2016: Women's Health Initiative Team:

Ross L. Prentice, Garnet L. Anderson, Bette Caan, Rowan T. Chlebowski, Rebecca D. Jackson, Charles Kooperberg, JoAnn E. Manson, Electra D. Paskett, Jacques E. Rossouw, Sally A. Shumaker, Marcia L. Stefanick, Cynthia Ann Thomson, Jean Wactawski-Wende

- 2015: Designing AR Inhibitors Team:

Charles L. Sawyers, Michael E. Jung, Howard Scher

- 2014: Duke University/Johns Hopkins, and NCI Malignant Brain Tumor Team:

Darell D. Bigner, Bert Vogelstein, Ira Pastan, Daniel Barboriak, Oren J. Becher, Thomas J. Cummings, Annick Desjardins, Luis A. Diaz, Allan Friedman, Henry S. Friedman, Matthias Gromeier, Sridharan Gururangan, Yiping He, Kenneth W. Kinzler, Chien-Tsun Kuan, Roger E. McLendon, Nickolas Papadopoulos, Katherine B. Peters, Tulika Ranjan, B. K. Ahmed Rasheed, John H. Sampson, Victor E. Velculescu, Gordana Vlahovic, Jason A. Watts, Hai Yan, Michael R. Zalutsky

- 2013: Johns Hopkins Pancreatic Cancer Sequencing Team in the Sol Goldman Pancreatic Cancer Research Center at Johns Hopkins University:

Ralph H. Hruban, N. Volkan Adsay, Peter J. Allen, Michael A. Choti, Luis A. Diaz, James R. Eshleman, Michael G. Goggins, Joseph M. Herman, Christine A. Iacobuzio-Donahue, Scott E. Kern, Kenneth W. Kinzler, Alison P. Klein, David S. Klimstra, Anirban Maitra, Alan K. Meeker, Nickolas Papadopoulos, Victor E. Velculescu, Bert Vogelstein, Christopher L. Wolfgang, Laura DeLong Wood

- 2012: The Institute of Cancer Research (ICR) and Royal Marsden Hospital: Cancer Research UK Cancer Therapeutics Unit and Drug Development Units:

Bissan Al-Lazikani, Udai Banerji, Julian Blagg, Ian Collins, Johann De Bono, Sue Eccles, Michelle Garrett, Swen Hoelder, Keith Jones, Stan Kaye, Spiros Linardopoulos, Richard Marais, Flo Raynaud, Caroline Springer, Rob van Montfort, Paul Workman

- 2011: Seattle HPV Research Team:

Janet R. Daling, Denise A. Galloway, James Hughes, Nancy B. Kiviat, Laura Koutsky, Margaret M. Madeleine, Constance Mao, Barbara McKnight, Peggy L. Porter, Stephen M. Schwartz, Hisham K. Tamimi, Long-fu Xi

- 2010: Dana-Farber/Harvard Cancer Center Thoracic Oncology Research Team:

Michael J. Eck, Jeffery Engelman, Nathanael Gray, Daniel Haber, Pasi A. Janne, Bruce E. Johnson, Susumu Kobayashi, Eunice Kwak, Neal Lindeman, Thomas J. Lynch, Shyamala Maheswaran, Matthew L. Meyerson, Lecia V. Sequist, Jeffery Settleman, Daniel G. Tenen, Mehmet Toner, Kwok-Kin Wong

- 2009: St. Jude Children's Research Hospital Acute Lymphoblastic Leukemia Team:

Dario Campana, Cheng Cheng, James R. Downing, William E. Evans, Melissa M. Hudson, Sima Jeha, Charles Mullighan, Ching-Hon Pui, Susana C. Raimondi, Mary V. Relling, Raul C. Ribeiro

- 2008: University of California San Francisco, the Lawrence Berkeley National Laboratory and Roswell Park Comprehensive Cancer Center:

Donna G. Albertson, Jane Fridyland, Joe W. Gray, Ajay Jain, Anne H. Kallioniemi, Olli-Pekka Kallioniemi, Robert Nordmeyer, Norma J. Nowak, Daniel Pinkel, Antoine Sniders, Damir Sudar, Frederick M. Waldmann

- 2007: University of Michigan-Brigham and Women's Hospital Team:

Xuhong Cao, Arul Chinnaiyan, Saravana Dhanasekaran, Rohit Mehra, James Montie, Kenneth Pienta, Robin Rasor, Daniel Rhodes, Rajal Shah, Scott A. Tomlins, Sooryanarayana Varambally, John Wei, Francesca Demichelis, Charles Lee, Sven Perner, Mark A. Rubin
