= List of members of the National Academy of Sciences (medical genetics, hematology and oncology) =

This list is a subsection of the List of members of the National Academy of Sciences, which includes members and international members of the United States National Academy of Sciences, living and deceased, each affiliated with one of the academy's disciplinary sections. Members are listed under their primary section, and each entry gives the person's name, primary institution, and election year. For deceased members, the year of death is noted.

== Medical genetics, hematology, and oncology ==
Name	Institution	Date
Cory Abate-Shen	Columbia University Vagelos College of Physicians and Surgeons	2025
Jerry M. Adams	The Walter and Eliza Hall Institute of Medical Research	2008
Kari Alitalo	University of Helsinki	2013
David Matthew Altshuler	Vertex Pharmaceuticals	2025
Edwin Astwood (died 1976)	New England Medical Center	1957
Richard Axel	Columbia University	1983
Bernard M. Babior (died 2004)	Scripps Research Institute	1999
Mariano Barbacid	Spanish National Cancer Research Center (CNIO)	2012
Dafna Bar-Sagi	NYU Langone Health	2020
Stephen B. Baylin	Johns Hopkins University School of Medicine	2017
Alexander Bearn (died 2009)	American Philosophical Society	1972
Arthur L. Beaudet	Baylor College of Medicine	2011
Shelley L. Berger	University of Pennsylvania	2018
Rene Bernards	The Netherlands Cancer Institute	2020
Anton J. M. Berns	The Netherlands Cancer Institute	2016
Bruce Beutler	The University of Texas Southwestern Medical Center	2008
Ernest Beutler (died 2008)	Scripps Research Institute	1976
J. Michael Bishop (died 2026)	University of California, San Francisco	1980
Baruch S. Blumberg (died 2011)	Fox Chase Cancer Center	1975
Walter Bodmer	University of Oxford	1981
Henry Bourne (died 2023)	University of California, San Francisco	1994
Kenneth M. Brinkhous (died 2000)	University of North Carolina at Chapel Hill	1972
Judith Campisi (died 2024)	Buck Institute for Research on Aging	2018
Dennis Carson	University of California, San Diego School of Medicine	2003
C. Thomas Caskey (died 2022)	Baylor College of Medicine	1993
William Bosworth Castle (died 1990)	Harvard University	1939
Webster K. Cavenee	University of California, San Diego	1997
Aravinda Chakravarti	New York University Grossman School of Medicine	2015
Howard Y. Chang	Stanford University	2020
Lieping Chen	Yale School of Medicine	2021
Zhu Chen	Shanghai Jiao Tong University	2003
Arul M. Chinnaiyan	University of Michigan School of Medicine	2020
James E. Cleaver	University of California, San Francisco	1999
Melanie H. Cobb	The University of Texas Southwestern Medical Center	2006
Lowell T. Coggeshall (died 1987)	The University of Chicago	1949
Barry S. Coller	The Rockefeller University	2003
Francis S. Collins	National Institutes of Health	1993
Neal G. Copeland	The University of Texas MD Anderson Cancer Center	2009
Suzanne Cory	The Walter and Eliza Hall Institute of Medical Research	1997
Lisa M. Coussens	Oregon Health & Science University	2023
Carlo Croce	The Ohio State University	1996
Eugene P. Cronkite (died 2001)	Brookhaven National Laboratory	1981
Alan D. D’Andrea	Dana–Farber Cancer Institute	2021
George Q. Daley	Harvard Medical School	2025
Riccardo Dalla-Favera	Columbia University	2015
Jean Dausset (died 2009)	Fondation Jean Dausset-CEPH	1981
Albert de la Chapelle (died 2020)	The Ohio State University	1997
Titia de Lange	The Rockefeller University	2006
Frederic J. de Sauvage	Genentech	2022
Sharon Dent	The University of Texas MD Anderson Cancer Center	2024
Ronald A. DePinho	The University of Texas MD Anderson Cancer Center	2012
John E. Dick	University Health Network	2025
Vishva M. Dixit	Genentech	2013
Richard Doll (died 2005)	Cancer Research UK	2001
Brian J. Druker	Oregon Health & Science University	2007
Thaddeus P. Dryja	Harvard Medical School	1996
Lawrence H. Einhorn	Indiana University School of Medicine	2001
Robert N. Eisenman	Fred Hutchinson Cancer Center	1998
Stephen J. Elledge	Harvard Medical School	2003
Charles T. Esmon	Oklahoma Medical Research Foundation	2002
Napoleone Ferrara	University of California, San Diego	2006
Joseph Fraumeni Jr.	National Institutes of Health	2002
Charlotte Friend (died 1987)	Mount Sinai School of Medicine	1976
Jacob Furth (died 1979)	Cornell Medical College	1974
Stanley M. Gartler (died 2026)	University of Washington	1989
Eloise R. Giblett (died 2009)	Puget Sound Blood Center	1980
David Ginsburg	University of Michigan	2007
David V. Goeddel	The Column Group	1994
Larry Gold	No Affiliation	1995
Joseph L. Goldstein	The University of Texas Southwestern Medical Center	1980
Todd R. Golub	The Broad Institute	2024
Margaret Anne Goodell	Baylor College of Medicine	2025
Ludwik Gross (died 1999)	Veterans Affairs Medical Center	1973
Mark Groudine	Fred Hutchinson Cancer Center	2001
Daniel A. Haber	Massachusetts General Hospital	2018
Hidesaburo Hanafusa (died 2009)	Osaka Bioscience Institute	1985
Douglas Hanahan	Ludwig Institute for Cancer Research	2009
Ed Harlow	Harvard Medical School	1993
Gertrude Henle (died 2006)	University of Pennsylvania	1979
Katherine Ann High	The Rockefeller University	2021
Helen H. Hobbs	The University of Texas Southwestern Medical Center	2007
Susan Band Horwitz	Albert Einstein College of Medicine	2005
Charles B. Huggins (died 1997)	University of Chicago	1949
Tony Hunter	Salk Institute for Biological Studies	1998
Vernon Martin Ingram (died 2006)	Massachusetts Institute of Technology	2002
Tyler Jacks	Massachusetts Institute of Technology	2009
Leon O. Jacobson (died 1992)	University of Chicago	1965
Rudolf Jaenisch	Whitehead Institute for Biomedical Research	2003
Alec Jeffreys	University of Leicester	2005
Peter Anthony Jones	Van Andel Institute	2016
V. Craig Jordan (died 2024)	The University of Texas MD Anderson Cancer Center	2009
William G. Kaelin Jr.	Harvard Medical School	2010
Yuet Wai Kan	University of California, San Francisco School of Medicine	1986
Henry S. Kaplan (died 1984)	Stanford University	1972
Michael B. Kastan	Duke University	2016
Haig H. Kazazian Jr. (died 2022)	Johns Hopkins University School of Medicine	2018
Kenneth W. Kinzler	Sidney Kimmel Comprehensive Cancer Center	2016
Richard D. Klausner	Altos Labs	1993
Seymour J. Klebanoff (died 2016)	University of Washington	1987
George Klein (died 2016)	Karolinska Institute	1973
Alfred G. Knudson Jr. (died 2016)	Fox Chase Cancer Center	1988
Richard D. Kolodner	Ludwig Institute for Cancer Research	2000
Hilary Koprowski (died 2013)	Thomas Jefferson University	1976
Stuart Kornfeld (died 2025)	Washington University in St. Louis	1982
Stanley J. Korsmeyer (died 2005)	Dana-Farber Cancer Institute	1995
Louis M. Kunkel	Harvard Medical School	1990
Eric S. Lander	The Broad Institute	1997
David P. Lane	Karolinska Institutet	2022
Arnold J. Levine	Institute for Advanced Study	1991
Beth Levine (died 2020)	The University of Texas Southwestern Medical Center	2013
Philip Levine (died 1987)	Ortho Research Foundation	1966
Alexander Levitzki	The Hebrew University of Jerusalem	2017
Timothy J. Ley	Washington University School of Medicine in St. Louis	2019
Frank Lilly (died 1995)	Albert Einstein College of Medicine	1983
John Littlefield (died 2017)	Johns Hopkins University	1977
David M. Livingston (died 2021)	Harvard University	1995
Yuk-Ming Dennis Lo	The Chinese University of Hong Kong	2013
Irving M. London (died 2018)	Massachusetts Institute of Technology	1971
Scott W. Lowe	Memorial Sloan Kettering Cancer Center	2017
Douglas R. Lowy	National Institutes of Health	2009
Guillermina Lozano	The University of Texas MD Anderson Cancer Center	2017
Philip W. Majerus (died 2016)	Washington University in St. Louis	1986
Donald C. Malins (died 2022)	Pacific Northwest Research Institute	1995
Thomas Maniatis	Columbia University	1985
Vincent T. Marchesi	Yale University	1988
Paul Marks (died 2020)	Memorial Sloan-Kettering Cancer Center	1973
Frank McCormick	University of California, San Francisco	2014
Victor A. McKusick (died 2008)	Johns Hopkins University	1973
Donald Metcalf (died 2014)	University of Melbourne	1987
Elizabeth C. Miller (died 1987)	University of Wisconsin–Madison	1978
James A. Miller (died 2000)	University of Wisconsin–Madison	1978
Carl Moore (died 1972)	Washington University School of Medicine	1970
Patrick S. Moore	University of Pittsburgh	2012
Deborah K. Morrison	National Cancer Institute	2022
Sean J. Morrison	The University of Texas Southwestern Medical Center	2020
Newton E. Morton (died 2018)	University of Southampton	1990
Arno G. Motulsky (died 2018)	University of Washington	1976
Benjamin G. Neel	New York University Langone Medical Center	2022
Karen E. Nelson	Thermo Fisher Scientific	2017
Peter C. Nowell (died 2016)	University of Pennsylvania	1976
Andre Nussenzweig	National Cancer Institute	2023
Susumu Ohno (died 2000)	Beckman Research Institute	1981
Olufunmilayo I. Olopade	University of Chicago	2021
Maynard V. Olson	University of Washington	1994
Moshe Oren	Weizmann Institute of Science	2019
Stuart H. Orkin	Harvard Medical School	1991
Luis F. Parada	Memorial Sloan-Kettering Cancer Center	2011
Ira Pastan	National Institutes of Health	1982
Tony Pawson (died 2013)	Samuel Lunenfeld Research Institute	2004
Helen Piwnica-Worms	The University of Texas MD Anderson Cancer Center	2023
Kornelia Polyak	Dana–Farber Cancer Institute	2022
Van R. Potter (died 2001)	University of Wisconsin-Madison	1975
Carol L. Prives	Columbia University	2008
Darwin J. Prockop (died 2024)	Tulane University	1991
Murray Rabinowitz (died 1983)	University of Chicago	1983
Helen M. Ranney (died 2010)	University of California, San Diego	1973
Oscar D. Ratnoff (died 2008)	Case Western Reserve University	1976
Arthur Riggs (died 2022)	City of Hope National Medical Center	2006
Leon Rosenberg (died 2022)	Princeton University	1985
Steven A. Rosenberg	National Institutes of Health	2024
Martine F. Roussel	St. Jude Children's Research Hospital	2019
Janet D. Rowley (died 2013)	University of Chicago	1984
Harry Rubin (died 2020)	University of California, Berkeley	1978
Erkki Ruoslahti	Sanford Burnham Prebys Medical Discovery Institute	1999
Leo Sachs (died 2013)	Weizmann Institute of Science	1995
Charles Sawyers	Memorial Sloan-Kettering Cancer Center	2010
Andrew V. Schally (died 2024)	Veterans Affairs Medical Center	1978
Joseph Schlessinger	Yale School of Medicine	2000
Carl F. Schmidt (died 1988)	University of Pennsylvania	1949
Gregg L. Semenza	Johns Hopkins University School of Medicine	2008
Charles J. Sherr	St. Jude Children's Research Hospital	1995
Yang Shi	University of Oxford	2024
Ali Shilatifard	Northwestern University Feinberg School of Medicine	2025
Yosef Shiloh	Tel Aviv University Medical School	2023
Louis Siminovitch (died 2021)	University of Toronto	1999
M. Celeste Simon	University of Pennsylvania, Perelman School of Medicine	2021
William S. Sly (died 2025)	Saint Louis University	1989
Nancy A. Speck	University of Pennsylvania	2019
Sol Spiegelman (died 1983)	Columbia University	1965
Louis M. Staudt	National Institutes of Health	2013
Thomas P. Stossel (died 2019)	Harvard University	1997
Takashi Sugimura (died 2020)	Japan Academy	1982
E. Donnall Thomas (died 2012)	Fred Hutchinson Cancer Research Center	1982
Craig B. Thompson	Memorial Sloan Kettering Cancer Center	2005
George J. Todaro	Washington Research Foundation	1986
Lap-Chee Tsui	Victor and William Fung Foundation	2004
William N. Valentine (died 2014)	University of California, Los Angeles	1977
George F. Vande Woude (died 2021)	Van Andel Institute	1993
Harold E. Varmus	Weill Cornell Medical College	1984
J. Craig Venter	The J. Craig Venter Institute	2002
Inder M. Verma	Jubilant Therapeutics	1997
Bert Vogelstein	Sidney Kimmel Comprehensive Cancer Center	1992
Karen H. Vousden	The Francis Crick Institute	2018
Erwin F. Wagner	Medical University of Vienna	2021
Jan G. Waldenstrøm (died 1996)	Lund University	1969
Douglas C. Wallace	Children's Hospital of Philadelphia	1995
David C. Ward (died 2023)	Nevada Cancer Institute	1998
Shields Warren (died 1980)	New England Deaconess Hospital	1962
Stephen T. Warren (died 2021)	Emory University	2011
Robert H. Waterston	University of Washington	2000
David Weatherall (died 2018)	University of Oxford	1990
Robert A. Weinberg	Whitehead Institute for Biomedical Research	1985
Harold M. Weintraub (died 1995)	Fred Hutchinson Cancer Center	1986
Sherman M. Weissman	Yale School of Medicine	1983
Eileen White	Rutgers, The State University of New Jersey, New Brunswick	2021
Raymond L. White (died 2018)	University of California, San Francisco	1992
Michael H. Wigler	Cold Spring Harbor Laboratory	1989
Huntington F. Willard	Genome National Group, LLC	2013
Lewis T. Williams	Walking Fish Therapeutics	1997
M. M. Wintrobe (died 1986)	University of Utah	1973
Owen N. Witte	University of California, Los Angeles	1997
Richard D. Wood	The University of Texas MD Anderson Cancer Center	2023
Xiaodong Wang	National Institute of Biological Sciences	2004
George D. Yancopoulos	Regeneron Pharmaceuticals	2004
Leonard Zon	Boston Children's Hospital	2022
Harald zur Hausen (died 2023)	German Cancer Research Center	2009
