= Velculescu =

Velculescu is a Romanian surname. Notable people with the surname include:

- Delia Velculescu (born 1975), Romanian economist
- Victor Velculescu (born 1970), Romanian oncologist
