= Luis A. Diaz =

American oncologist

Luis A. Diaz Jr.
- Education: University of Michigan; Johns Hopkins School of Medicine
- Occupation: Oncologist
- Employer: Memorial Sloan Kettering Cancer Center
- Awards: See section
- Website: www.mskcc.org/cancer-care/doctors/luis-diaz-jr

Luis Alberto Diaz, Jr. is the Head of the Division of Solid Tumor Oncology in Memorial Sloan Kettering’s Department of Medicine.

== Education and career ==
Diaz earned his undergraduate and medical degree at the University of Michigan and Michigan Medicine, respectively. He completed his residency in internal medicine and medical oncology fellowship at Johns Hopkins School of Medicine. Diaz was a faculty member in the Department of Oncology at the Johns Hopkins University School of Medicine. He was also a member of the Ludwig Center for Cancer Genetics and Therapeutics at Johns Hopkins, where he worked with colleagues Bert Vogelstein, Kenneth Kinzler, Nickolas Papadopoulos, Victor Velculescu and Shibin Zhou. He was also head of the Swim Across America Laboratory at Johns Hopkins.

In 2017, Diaz became Head of the Solid Tumor Oncology division at Memorial Sloan Kettering. The same year, he was selected to lead the Stand Up to Cancer “Dream Team” against colorectal cancer. Diaz has founded several companies that focus on genomic analyses of cancers, including Inostics, PapGene, and Personal Genome Diagnostics. Diaz was named to the Board of Directors of Jounce Therapeutics in 2017.

Diaz was elected to the National Academy of Medicine in 2023.

== Research ==
Diaz researched the development of a liquid biopsy that can be used to test for the presence of cancer and to monitor its response to therapy. Also while at Hopkins, he and his colleagues developed a Pap smear to detect early-stage ovarian and endometrial cancers. He also led a study of pembrolizumab to target tumors that share a particular biomarker called mismatch repair deficiency. It was the first FDA approval for a cancer treatment based on a biomarker rather than the location in the body where the tumor originated.

== Awards ==
- American Association for Cancer Research Team Science Award (2013 for pancreatic cancer sequencing)
- American Association for Cancer Research Team Science Award (2014 for malignant brain tumors)
- American Association for Cancer Research Team Science Award (2017 for liquid biopsy initiative)
- Member, American Society for Clinical Investigation (2018)
- Gustave Roussey Award - 2026

== See also ==
- Department of Health and Human Services appointments by Joe Biden
