= Nicholas Lydon =

British biochemist (born 1957)

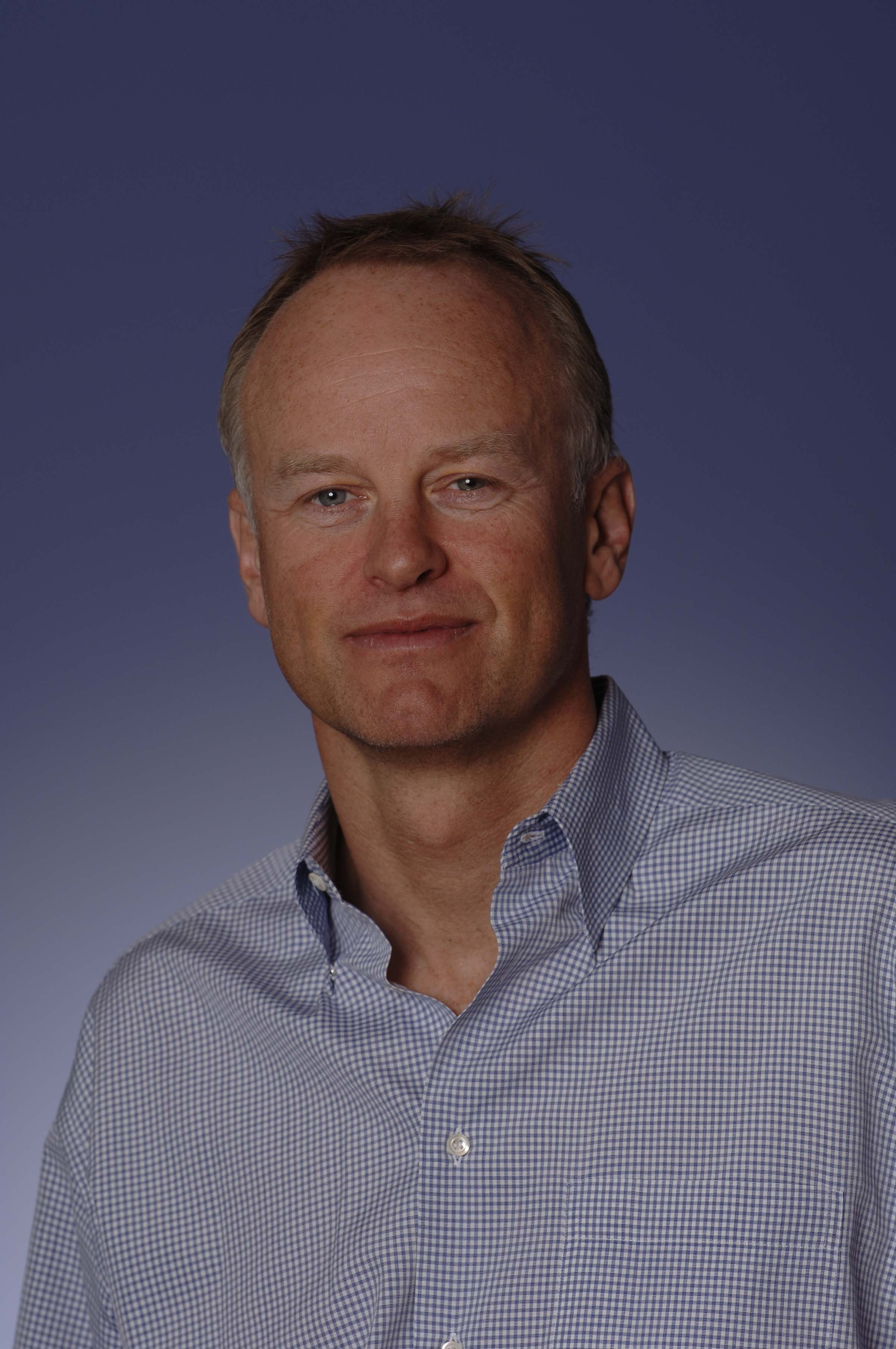
- Born: 27 February 1957 (age 69)
- Education: University of Leeds (BSc); University of Dundee (PhD)
- Known for: Gleevec; AnaptysBio; BluePrint Medicines
- Awards: Lasker Clinical Award (2009); Japan Prize (2012); FRS (2013)
- Scientific career
- Workplaces: Amgen; Schering-Plough; Ciba-Geigy
- Thesis: Studies on the hormone-sensitive adenylate cyclase from bovine corpus luteum (1982)
- Website: royalsociety.org/people/nicholas-lydon

Nicholas B. Lydon FRS (born 27 February 1957) is a British scientist and entrepreneur. In 2009, he was awarded the Lasker Clinical Award and in 2012 the Japan Prize for the development of Gleevec, also known as Imatinib, a selective BCR-ABL inhibitor for the treatment of chronic myeloid leukaemia (CML), which converted a fatal cancer into a manageable chronic condition.

== Education ==
Lydon was educated at Strathallan School near Perth, Scotland. He earned a Bachelor of Science degree in biochemistry from the University of Leeds, England in 1978 and received his PhD in biochemistry from the University of Dundee, Scotland in 1982.

== Career ==
In 1982, Lydon accepted a position with Schering-Plough based in France as Chargé de Récherche. Three years later, he moved to Switzerland to work with Ciba-Geigy Pharmaceuticals, with whom he developed Gleevec. In 1997, he established Kinetex Pharmaceuticals in Boston which was acquired by Amgen in 2000, with whom he worked until 2002. Thereafter, he established several companies that continue to develop drugs to treat various conditions.

== Honours and awards ==
- Warren Alpert Foundation Prize, 2000.
- Twenty First Annual AACR-Bruce F. Cain Memorial Award, 2002.
- Charles F. Kettering Prize, General Motors Cancer Research Foundation, 2002.
- The Lasker-DeBakey Clinical Medical Research Award, with Brian Druker and Charles Sawyers, 2009.
- The Japan Prize, with Brian Druker and Janet Rowley, 2012.
- Fellow of the Royal Society, 2013.
- Royal Society GlaxoSmithKline Prize and Lecture, 2014

Lydon's nomination for the Royal Society reads:

Nick Lydon played a decisive role in the development of Gleevec (Imatinib), a drug that has saved the lives of thousands of patients with chronic myelogenous leukaemia (CML) and gastrointestinal stromal tumours (GIST). Gleevec revolutionised the field of cancer drug discovery by changing rapidly fatal diseases into easily treatable conditions, and showed that, by targeting an oncogene that is the molecular cause of a specific cancer, the defective cancer cells can be killed without any major side effects on normal cells. The remarkable efficacy of Gleevec profoundly changed the perception of protein kinases as therapeutic targets. From being considered to be virtually "undruggable" in 1994, they have become the pharmaceutical industry's most popular class of drug target today, accounting for over 50% of cancer drug discovery R&D. The international prizes that Nick Lydon has received include, most recently, the Lasker-DeBakey Clinical Medical Research Award from The Lasker Foundation.
