= BEAMing =

In biotechnology BEAMing, which stands for beads, emulsion, amplification, magnetics, is a highly sensitive digital PCR method that combines emulsion PCR and flow cytometry to identify and quantify specific somatic mutations present in DNA.

== Process ==
BEAMing begins with the isolation of DNA from a patient’s blood or plasma sample. Target regions of the purified DNA undergo a pre-amplification step with conventional PCR utilizing primers of known sequences to amplify the genetic regions of interest.

The amplified DNA templates are then introduced to primers that are covalently bound to magnetic beads via streptavidin-biotin interactions and are compartmentalized into aqueous microdroplets of a water-in-oil emulsion. The aqueous phase is emulsified with the oil, creating millions of individual water droplets having a diameter of 3-10 microns. Within each droplet, a separate PCR reaction is performed. Due to the small size, each water droplet contains on average a single DNA molecule and a magnetic particle. In addition to the pre-amplified DNA, each emulsion droplet contains the necessary reagents and sequence-directed primer-coated magnetic beads to carry out the emulsion PCR reaction. The microemulsion droplets are temperature cycled using conventional PCR methods. Each DNA template (with the magnetic bead present in the aqueous compartment) is extended and amplified, resulting in a bead coated with thousands of identical copies of the template DNA fragment.

Usually a high-fidelity DNA polymerase is used in order to limit errors normally introduced during PCR. This precaution limits the risk of false-positive detection and enables the accurate discrimination of target molecules.

Following the emulsion PCR step, the water and oil phase are separated so that the microparticles can be collected in the aqueous phase. The microemulsion droplets are then broken to release the magnetic beads, which have the amplified copies of DNA attached. The beads are magnetically purified and base pair-specific fluorescent probes are attached. This helps distinguish between wild-type and mutant DNA fragments, as one fluorescent probe binds specifically to the wild-type DNA and the other to specific mutant DNA. Each fluorescently labeled bead is analyzed in a flow cytometer, resulting in a separation of mutant from wild-type DNA as well as the ratio of mutant to wild-type DNA present in a sample.

The microscopic emulsion droplets used in BEAMing allow for the compartmentalization of DNA segments into single droplets. Emulsion PCR is run on the compartmentalized DNA, enabling hundreds of millions of PCR reactions to run in parallel. This massively parallel PCR platform delivers high levels of sensitivity (.001%) for the detection of rare tumor DNA molecules among a large background of wild-type DNA.

== Applications ==
BEAMing is often used in cancer research to conduct assessments of circulating tumor DNA (ctDNA), also known as a liquid biopsy. It also allows for the quantification of a sample’s mutant fraction, which can be tracked over time using serial plasma measurements. The method has a sensitivity threshold of 0.01%.

== History ==
In the late 1990s, Vogelstein and Kinzler coined the term "digital polymerase chain reaction" when conducting research into somatic mutations associated with and potentially causative for colorectal cancer. A fundamental challenge that digital PCR was designed to address was the detection of minor quantities of a pre-determined somatic mutation in larger cell populations. While both digital and classical PCR can be used in quantitative or qualitative analyses, digital PCR analyzes samples one molecule at a time to produce an all-or-nothing signal thereby increasing the signal-to-noise ratio and overall sensitivity to rare targets. The results from these studies indicated that digital PCR was able to reliably quantify the relative proportion of variant sequences in a DNA sample.

BEAMing grew out of digital PCR technology and in 2003 was described in a Nature Methods publication from Vogelstein's team. In 2005, Vogelstein's team published their first clinical data applying BEAMing technology to analyze plasma samples of patients with cancer. In a 2008 Nature Medicine publication, BEAMing ctDNA measurements were sensitive enough to reliably monitor tumor dynamics.

In 2008, Inostics GmbH formed to commercialize BEAMing. In 2014, Inostics was acquired by Sysmex Corporation to form Sysmex Inostics.
