= Lucile Adams-Campbell =

American epidemiologist

Lucile L. Adams-Campbell
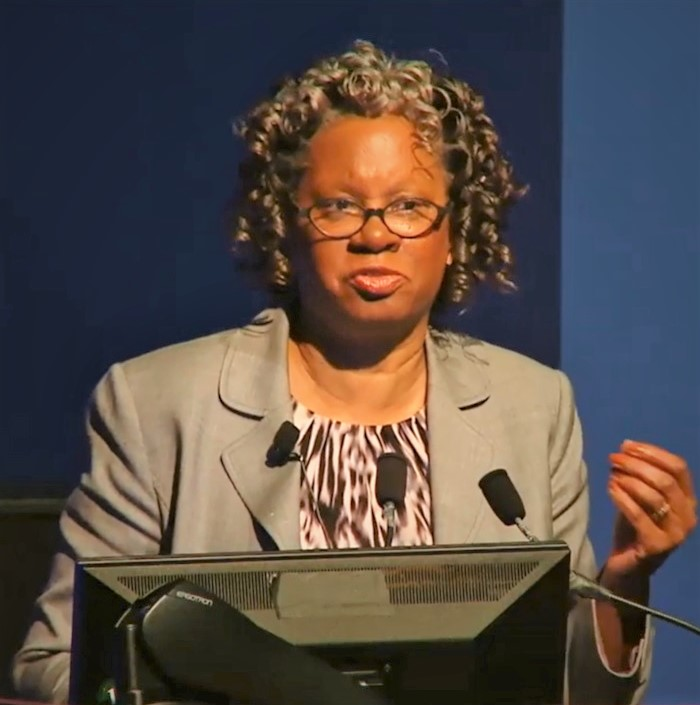
- Adams-Campbell speaks at the National Institutes of Health in 2019
- Born: December 30, 1953 (age 72)
- Education: Drexel University; University of Pittsburgh
- Scientific career
- Workplaces: Georgetown University Medical Center; Howard University; University of Pittsburgh; Johns Hopkins

Lucile L. Adams-Campbell (born December 30, 1953) is the first African-American woman to receive a PhD in epidemiology in the United States. She serves as the Professor of Oncology at Lombardi Comprehensive Cancer Center and associate director for Minority Health at the Georgetown University Medical Center. She is a Fellow of the National Academy of Medicine, and the Washington DC Hall of Fame.

== Early life and education ==
Adams-Campell was born in Washington, D.C. Her father, David, was a linguist and her mother, Florence, was a teacher. Adams-Campbell received a B.S. in biology at Drexel University where she originally majored in chemical engineering. As a student, she worked as an apprentice on naval ships. She remained at Drexel University for her graduate studies, completing a master's program in Biomedical Science. Campbell is the first African American woman to earn a doctorate degree in epidemiology. For her doctoral studies, Adams-Campbell joined the University of Pittsburgh Graduate School of Public Health, and graduated with a PhD in epidemiology in 1983. Her doctoral research considered hypertension in Black people. She worked at the University of Pittsburgh as a postdoctoral researcher until 1987, when she then was a senior research scientist at the New England Research Institute.

== Research and career ==
In 1995, she was appointed Director of the Howard University Cancer Center. At the time, she was the only Black woman to lead any cancer institute. Her research primarily focuses on understanding health disparities, especially cancers such as breast, prostate and colon cancers that disproportionately affect African-Americans. In the same year, Adams Campbell and Dr. Lynn Rosenberg from Boston University Medical School worked together to launch the first big study of heath in Black American women. The study is now known as the Black Women's Health Study, and in the study data from over 59,000 women which contributed to finding that racially based health disparities contributed to their higher risk for developing breast cancers among other things. Adams-Campbell's work uses clinical trials, cancer epidemiology and etiology along with lifestyle interventions and has led to over 200 peer-reviewed publications and international recognition as an expert in minority health and health disparities research. Currently, Adams-Campbell is a professor of oncology at the Lombardi Comprehensive Cancer Center at Georgetown University Medical Center. She is also the associate Director for Minority Health and Health Disparities Research, Senior Associate Dean for Community Outreach and Engagement, and is the Program Director of the Master's in Epidemiology Program, Graduate School of Arts and Sciences at Georgetown University in addition to being a member of the National Academy of Medicine. Campbell is an internationally recognized expert in minority health and disparities research. One of Dr. Adams-Campbell's recent achievements is serving as the lead researcher for the National Minority/Underserved NCI Community Oncology research Program. This program focuses on cancer prevention and makes sure that questions about health differences and equity are included in all of its studies. She has been a critic of the institution, pushing them to ensure adequate amounts of diversity for research studies and to eliminate the abundance of bias against minority-led research programs.

== Awards, honors and memberships ==
- 1993 Elected Fellow, American College of Epidemiology, Raleigh, North Carolina
- 2000 University of Pittsburgh Distinguished Alumni Award
- 2004 AACR Distinguished Service Award, American Association for Cancer Research, Philadelphia, Pennsylvania
- 2008 Elected Fellow of the National Academy of Medicine
- 2009 Washington DC Hall of Fame, Washington DC Hall of Fame Society, Washington, DC
- 2009 Leadership Award, Howard University Cancer Center, Washington, DC
- 2010 University of Pittsburgh Legacy Institute
- 2015 member of Dietary Guidelines Advisory Committee
- 2019 received the Aileen O'Brien Graef Speaker Award
- 2021 awarded the Joseph F. Fraumeni, Jr. Distinguished Achievement Award
- Previously served as Chair of the American Association for Cancer Research.
- National Academy of Medicine's National Cancer Policy Forum
- Board of Scientific Counselors of the National Human Genome Research Institute
- D.C. Hall of Fame
- Council Chair of American Association for Cancer Research's Women in Cancer Research (WICR)

== Selected publications ==
- NIH Consensus Development Panel on Osteoporosis Prevention, Diagnosis, and Therapy (February 14, 2001). "Osteoporosis Prevention, Diagnosis, and Therapy". JAMA: The Journal of the American Medical Association. 285 (6): 785–795. doi:10.1001/jama.285.6.785. ISSN 0098-7484. PMID 11176917.
- Chlebowski, Rowan T.; Wactawski-Wende, Jean; Ritenbaugh, Cheryl; Hubbell, F. Allan; Ascensao, Joao; Rodabough, Rebecca J.; Rosenberg, Carol A.; Taylor, Victoria M.; Harris, Randall; Chen, Chu; Adams-Campbell, Lucile L. (March 4, 2004). "Estrogen plus Progestin and Colorectal Cancer in Postmenopausal Women". New England Journal of Medicine. 350 (10): 991–1004. doi:10.1056/NEJMoa032071. ISSN 0028-4793. PMID 14999111.
- Prentice, Ross L.; Caan, Bette; Chlebowski, Rowan T.; Patterson, Ruth; Kuller, Lewis H.; Ockene, Judith K.; Margolis, Karen L.; Limacher, Marian C.; Manson, JoAnn E.; Parker, Linda M.; Paskett, Electra (February 8, 2006). "Low-Fat Dietary Pattern and Risk of Invasive Breast Cancer: The Women's Health Initiative Randomized Controlled Dietary Modification Trial". JAMA. 295 (6): 629–42. doi:10.1001/jama.295.6.629. ISSN 0098-7484. PMID 16467232.
- Chlebowski, Rowan T.; Chen, Zhao; Anderson, Garnet L.; Rohan, Thomas; Aragaki, Aaron; Lane, Dorothy; Dolan, Nancy C.; Paskett, Electra D.; McTiernan, Anne; Hubbell, F. Alan; Adams-Campbell, Lucile L. (March 16, 2005). "Ethnicity and Breast Cancer: Factors Influencing Differences in Incidence and Outcome". JNCI: Journal of the National Cancer Institute. 97 (6): 439–448. doi:10.1093/jnci/dji064. ISSN 0027-8874. PMID 15770008.

A comprehensive list of all publications can be found here.

== Personal life ==
Adams-Campbell is married to Thomas Campbell, who she attended high school with in Washington, D.C., but did not properly meet until her undergraduate degree at Drexel University. Adams-Campbell and Thomas Campbell started a family during their transition of advancing their careers. Lucile and her husband Thomas were committed to giving donations to students in need. They would make financial donations yearly to help students who attended the University, "GSPH Department of Epidemiology."
