= Daling =

Daling may refer to:

== Places in China ==
- Daling, Guangdong, town in Huidong County
- Daling, Gongzhuling, town in Jilin
- Daling, Changchun, town in Yushu, Jilin
- Daling Township, Guangxi, in Tantang District, Guigang
- Daling Township, Heilongjiang, former township of Acheng District, Harbin
- Daling Township, Sichuan, in Hanyuan County
- Daling River, river in Northeast China

== People with the surname ==
- Janet Daling, American epidemiologist
