= Howard Scher =

American professor

Howard I. Scher is the Chief of the Genitourinary Oncology at Memorial Sloan Kettering Cancer Center and Professor of Medicine at the Weill Cornell Medical College. He has a depth of experience in clinical trials for novel types of cancer treatment.

== Early life and education ==
Scher earned his BS from Bates College and his MD from New York University School of Medicine before doing his residency at Bellevue Hospital. He married Deborah Ann Lafer in 1989.

== Career ==
Scher has been an investigator at Memorial Sloan Kettering Cancer Center since 1992 and Professor of Medicine at the Weill Cornell Medical College. His areas of research include PI3K, the androgen receptor, HSP90, and immunotherapy.

Scher is on the board of directors at Asterias, a biotechnology company.

Scher was awarded American Association for Cancer Research's 2015 Team Science Award along with Michael E. Jung and Charles Sawyers for their work in the development of enzalutamide. He has also collaborated with Brett Carver and Neal Rosen, both also at MSKCC, on experimental cancer therapeutics for androgen-resistance prostate cancer.

Scher has published over 500 scholarly works.
