= Lawrence A. Loeb =

American scientist and cancer researcher

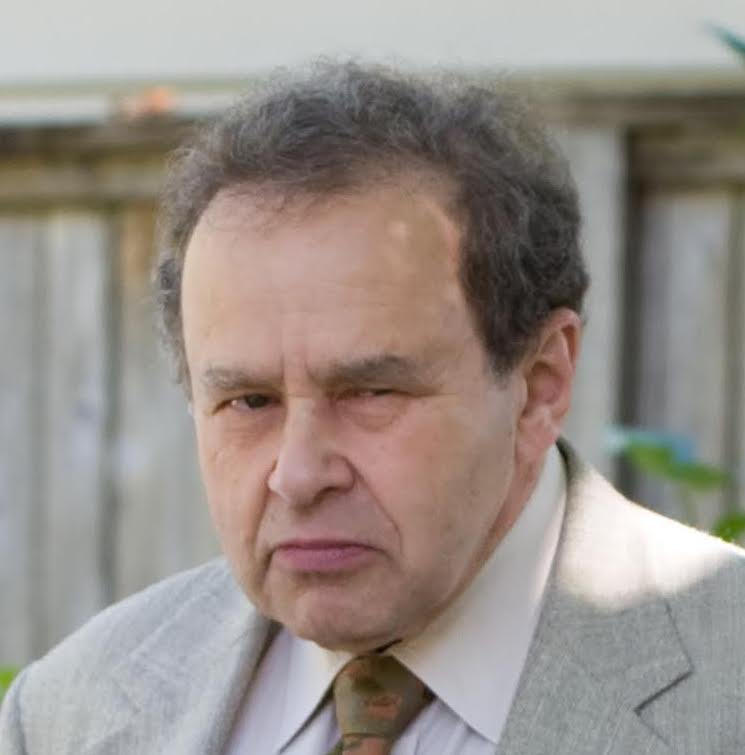
- Loeb in 2009
- Born: December 25, 1936 (age 89); Poughkeepsie, New York, United States
- Education: City College of New York (BS , 1957); Bellevue Hospital Medical College (MD, 1961); University of California, Berkeley (PhD, 1967)
- Scientific career
- Fields: Genomics; Genetics; Cancer; DNA sequencing
- Workplaces: Institute for Cancer Research; University of Washington

Lawrence A. "Larry" Loeb is an American cancer researcher and genome scientist. He is a professor of pathology and biochemistry at the University of Washington. Loeb is best known for his work on the fidelity of DNA polymerase, and his proposal of the mutator phenotype hypothesis in cancers.

== Biography ==
Loeb was born in Poughkeepsie, New York. He enrolled in the City College of New York at age 17, earning his bachelor's degree in 1957. In 1958, he matriculated at Bellevue Hospital Medical College earning his medical doctorate three years later. Loeb completed his medical internship at Stanford University from 1961 to 1962.

Loeb left medical practice for scientific research, serving as a research associate with Harry V. Gelboin at the National Cancer Institute from 1962 to 1964. He then resumed work as a research associate with Daniel Mazia at the University of California, Berkeley, and ultimately earned a PhD in biochemistry in 1967.

Loeb worked at the Institute for Cancer Research (now Fox Chase Cancer Center) from 1967 to 1978 before accepting a faculty position at the University of Washington department of Pathology in 1978, as Director of The Joseph Gottstein Memorial Cancer Research Laboratory. Loeb remained at the University of Washington until his retirement in 2023.

Loeb has served as President of the American Association for Cancer Research and the Environmental Mutagen Society, and on the board of directors for the American Association for Cancer Research. He also served as director of the University of Washington Medical Scientist Training Program from 1986 to 2011.

== Career ==
Loeb's work has focused on understanding the mechanisms that generate human somatic mutations, and illuminating the role of mutations in establishing and driving human cancers. His efforts have emphasized the use of molecular biology in ascertaining both the function of healthy cells and in defining differences between normal and malignant cells.

Loeb made major contributions to the understanding the fidelity of DNA synthesis, and developed the first methods for quantitating error rates in that process. Loeb has used such techniques to assess the fidelity of various DNA polymerases and to investigate the effects of environmental and chemical carcinogenesis, as well as mutagenesis induced by metal ions and by oxygen-free radicals. Loeb's laboratory developed “Duplex Sequencing” technology, which permits high accuracy high throughput sequencing for the identification of low prevalence mutations.

Loeb was the first to propose the “mutator phenotype” hypothesis of cancers. This hypothesis posits that, because malignant cells exhibit defects in the fidelity of DNA replication, large numbers of mutations accumulate genome wide as they divide during tumor progression. This phenotype results in a heterogeneous population of cancer cells and lineages within a tumor, wherein individual clones may display different attributes that contribute to the fitness of a tumor, such as resistance to radiation or chemotherapy, or the ability of cancer cells to metastasize or disseminate. Evidence supporting this hypothesis has subsequently been provided by many different researchers, and the idea has proven very influential in the field of cancer research.

Loeb co-authored the section on carcinogenesis in the 1984 AACR position paper describing the link between smoking and lung cancer, and that emphasized smoking prevention and smoking cessation as strategies for harm reduction at the population level, and is considered an international leader in advocacy to reduce tobacco use.

== Awards ==
- Salk Scholarship in Medicine, City of New York, 1957–1961
- Brittain Award in Moral Philosophy, City College of New York, 1957
- Baskerville Award in Chemistry, City College of New York, 1957
- Fellow, American College of Physicians, 1966
- Seventh Annual Misra-Baptia Medal, Lucknow Medical School, India, 1996
- Outstanding Investigator Award, National Cancer Institute, 1985–1999
- Fellow, American Association for the Advancement of Science, 1986
- Abbot Laboratory Distinguished Scientist Lectureship, 1988
- Lorenzini Foundation Lecturer, Urbino Italy, 1988
- AACR-Princess Takamatsu Award, 2008
- J. B. Little Award, Harvard University, 2008
- Fellow, American Academy of Arts and Sciences, 2016
