= Kornelia Polyak =

Hungarian-Anerican cancer researcher

- Education: Albert Szent-Gyorgyi Medical University; Cornell University
- Scientific career
- Workplaces: Harvard Medical School/Dana–Farber Cancer Institute

Kornelia Polyak is a professor of medicine at Harvard Medical School and an internationally recognized breast cancer expert.

Polyak earned her MD from Albert Szent-Gyorgyi Medical University in Szeged, Hungary, and her PhD from Weill Cornell Graduate School of Medical Sciences/Sloan-Kettering Cancer Center in New York City. She then did a fellowship in cancer genetics at Johns Hopkins Oncology Center with Bert Vogelstein and Kenneth Kinzler.

In 1998, Polyak joined the faculty of Dana–Farber Cancer Institute. Her research focuses on breast tumor evolution. Her work connects biomedical investigation directly with patient care, with the goal of understanding breast tumor development and evolution and applying that knowledge to improve clinical management. Polyak has pioneered research into the relationship between the tumor microenvironment and tumor evolution, contributing to major advances in understanding breast tumorigenesis. Her laboratory develops methods for studying tumors as integrated ecosystems and applies interdisciplinary strategies to clinical and experimental questions. The team has been at the forefront of analyzing defined cell populations from normal and neoplastic human breast tissue at single-cell resolution. It also uses mathematical and ecological models to interpret experimental and clinical data, helping clarify how intratumor heterogeneity and systemic and local factors influence tumor behavior. Her research has three principal goals. First, the Polyak laboratory seeks to improve prediction of breast cancer risk and develop ways to prevent cancer initiation and progression. Second, it investigates the drivers of tumor evolution, particularly mechanisms underlying immune escape, intratumor heterogeneity, and resistance to therapy. Third, it identifies novel therapeutic targets, with a special focus on triple-negative and inflammatory breast cancers. All these studies use tissues from patients with breast cancer and, for risk research, healthy women. Observations in clinical samples are used to generate hypotheses that are tested in experimental models, with findings subsequently translated back into clinical care. Her laboratory has demonstrated clinical impact by helping advance JAK and BET bromodomain inhibitors into Phase I/II trials for triple-negative and inflammatory breast cancer. Her research is funded in part by the Breast Cancer Research Foundation.

From 2010 to 2013, she served on the American Association for Cancer Research Board of Directors, and from 2015 to 2019, she was a member of the AACR Women in Cancer Research council.

== Awards ==
- 2007 AACR 27th Annual Award for Outstanding Achievement in Cancer Research
- 2008 Elected member of the American Society for Clinical Investigation
- 2011 Paul Marks Prize for Cancer Research
- 2012 AACR Outstanding Investigator Award for Breast Cancer Research
- 2015 Outstanding Investigator Award, National Cancer Institute
- 2016 Rosalind Franklin Award
- 2019 AAAS Fellow
- 2020 Fellows of the AACR Academy
- 2020 Distinguished Alumna Award, Weill Cornell Graduate School of Medical Sciences
- 2022 National Academy of Sciences
- 2022 National Academy of Medicine
- 2022 American Cancer Society Research Professor
- 2023 AACR Distinguished Lectureship in Breast Cancer Research
- 2024 Honorary Citizen, City of Szolnok, Hungary
- 2026 Jill Rose Award, Breast Cancer Research Foundation
