= Nathanael Gray =

American chemist

- Education: UC Berkeley
- Scientific career
- Workplaces: Stanford University; Harvard Medical School; Dana–Farber Cancer Institute; Genomics Institute of the Novartis Research Foundation

Nathanael S. Gray is an American chemist. He serves as Krishnan-Shah Family Professor of chemical and systems biology at Stanford University and director of cancer therapeutics programme at Stanford University School of Medicine. Previously he was a Nancy Lurie Marks Professor of biological chemistry and molecular pharmacology at Harvard Medical School and professor of cancer biology at Dana–Farber Cancer Institute. Gray is also co-founder, science advisory board member (SAB) and equity holder in C4 Therapeutics, Gatekeeper, Syros, Petra, B2S, Aduro, Jengu, Allorion, Inception Therapeutics, and Soltego (board member). C4 Therapeutics, which offered IPO in 2020, was founded based on the research of Jay Bradner, currently an executive vice president at Amgen, and of Nathanael S. Gray, while he was professor at Harvard Medical School. Before moving to Stanford University, Nathanael S. Gray created Center for Protein Degradation at Harvard Medical School with $80 million agreement with Deerfield Management venture capital firm. In 2020, Gray Lab permanently moved to Stanford University, that was stated by Stuart Schreiber, co-founder of Broad Institute as "Stanford's huge gain".

== Career ==
Gray grew up in Zambia, Yemen, India and Sudan and moved to California for high school. Nathanael Gray received his BS and PhD in organic chemistry from UC Berkeley in 1999 where he discovered purvalanol. He worked at the Genomics Institute of the Novartis Research Foundation in San Diego where he supervised a group of over fifty researchers as the director of biological chemistry. He moved to Harvard Medical School and the Dana–Farber Cancer Institute in 2006. Among the discoveries his lab has made are Torin1, an ATP-competitive mTOR inhibitor, BMK1, an inhibitor of ERK5, and inhibitors of EGFR, mTor, Bcr-Abl, Mps1, Erk5, b-Raf and Ephrin kinases.

== Awards ==
- 2007 National Science Foundation Career award
- 2008 Damon Runyon Foundation Innovator award
- 2010 American Association for Cancer Research for Team Science
- 2011 American Association for Cancer Research Outstanding Achievement Award
- 2011 Eli Lilly Award in Biological Chemistry
- 2011 American Chemical Society award for Biological Chemistry
- 2013 Meyenburg Prize
- 2019 Paul Marks Prize for Cancer Research
