= Susan L. Cohn =

Professor of pediatrics

Susan Lerner Cohn is a professor of pediatrics and section chief of oncology and hematopoietic stem cell transplantation at the Pritzker School of Medicine of the University of Chicago. She is recognized for her contributions to pediatric oncology research.

Cohn received her BA in biology from Northwestern University in 1976. Four years later, she completed her MD degree at the University of Illinois College of Medicine and then did her pediatrics residency at Michael Reese Hospital in 1984 and a fellowship in pediatric hematology and oncology at Lurie Children's Hospital and Northwestern University in 1987.

In 2019, Cohn was replaced by Walter Stadler as dean for clinical research.

== Awards ==
In 2016, Cohn became a fellow of the American Society of Clinical Oncology. In 2019, the American Association for Cancer Research awarded her with the Joseph H. Burchenal Memorial Award for her "Outstanding Achievement in Clinical Cancer Research".
