= Robin Rasor =

Technology transfer professional

Robin L. Rasor a.k.a. Ruth Rasor (b. 1956) is a technology transfer professional with an MS in genetics who serves as the Executive director of the Duke University Licensing & Ventures office.

== Background and career ==
Rasor received her BS in bacteriology from Ohio Wesleyan University and her MS in genetics from Ohio State University. She worked at Battelle Memorial Institute and in various roles in technology licensing at the University of Michigan, rising to become its Managing Director by 2014. In 2016, she was named to head the Duke University Office of Licensing and Ventures.

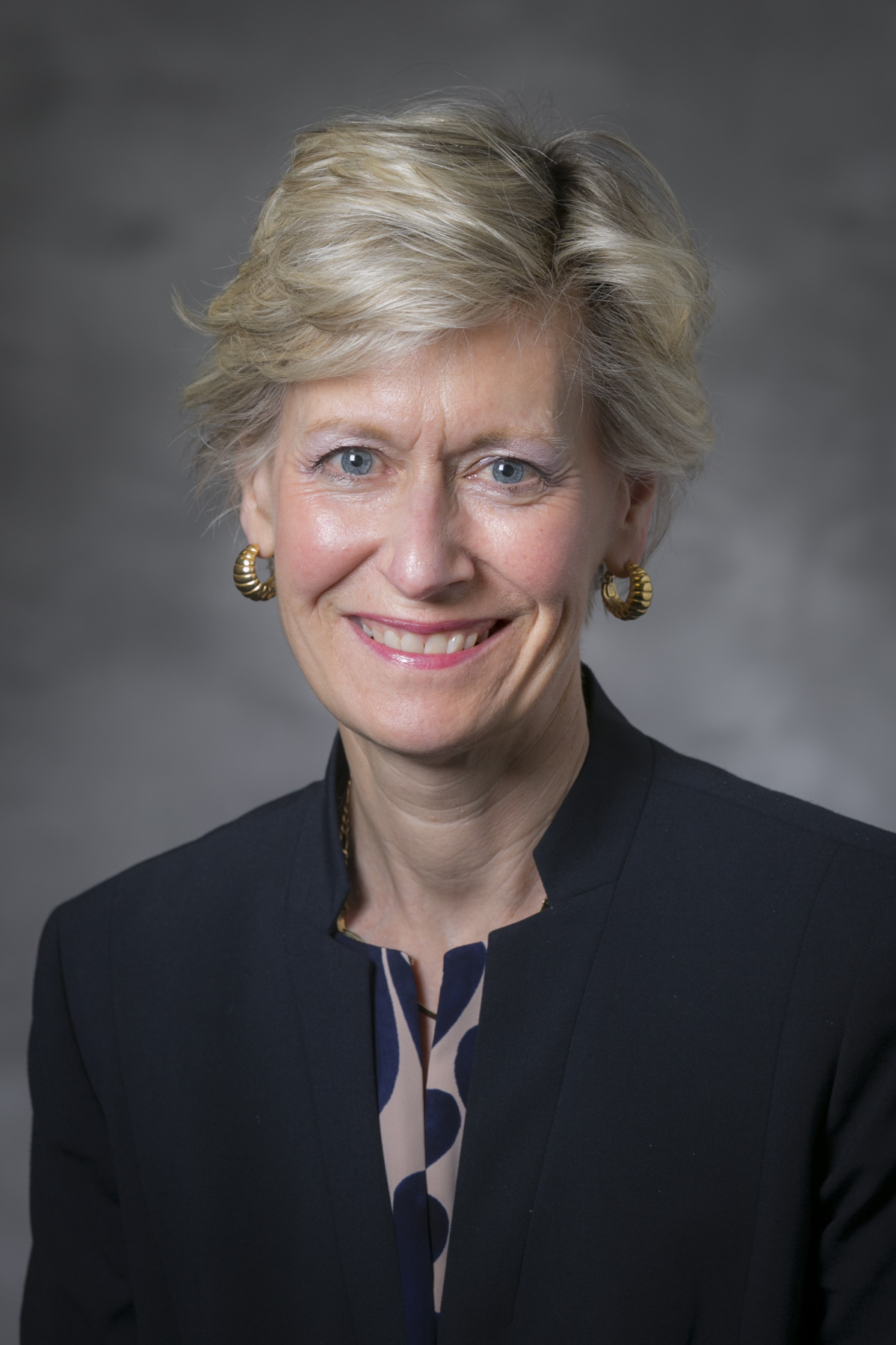
Robin Rasor

=== Senate testimony ===
On April 3, 2019, Rasor and three other female inventors testified before Chairman Thom Tillis and the United States Senate subcommittee on intellectual property on "lost" female inventors and scientific trailblazers. Her testimony pointed out the gender disparities in the Patent process, and suggested solutions including academic, nonprofit, and government interventions to address this problem. Rasor also proposed that a high percentage of female inventors in Duke's leadership structure led to a culture of innovation at the school.

== Awards and honors ==
- President of the Association of University Technology Managers, 2011-2013
- Co-recipient of AACR Awards Team Award, 2007
- President's Award for Service to AUTM, 2005
