= James R. Eshleman =

American physician-scientist

James R. Eshleman is an American physician‑scientist, professor of pathology and oncology at the Johns Hopkins University School of Medicine, and a cancer researcher known for his work on pancreatic cancer genetics, molecular pathology, and gene‑targeted therapies. He also serves as Associate Director of the Molecular Diagnostics Laboratory and holds the Ralph H. Hruban, M.D. Professorship in Pancreatic Cancer Research at Johns Hopkins.

== Education ==
Eshleman received a Bachelor of Arts in Biophysics from the University of Pennsylvania in 1981. He subsequently earned both his M.D. and Ph.D. in Anatomy & Cell Biology from the University of Pennsylvania School of Medicine in 1988. He completed clinical training including an internship in internal medicine, followed by a residency in clinical pathology, and a fellowship in transfusion medicine at Penn and Internal medicine internship at Temple university.

== Career ==
=== Academic career ===
After his clinical and postdoctoral training, Eshleman held faculty positions at Case Western Reserve University School of Medicine. In 1997, he joined the Johns Hopkins Department of Pathology as an Assistant Professor and Associate Director of the Molecular Diagnostics Laboratory. He advanced to Associate Professor in 2002 and full Professor of Pathology and Oncology in 2010.

At Johns Hopkins, he has also served in leadership roles including Interim Director of Gastrointestinal Pathology from 2015 to 2016 and, beginning in 2022, as the inaugural holder of the Ralph H. Hruban Professorship in Pancreatic Cancer Research.

== Research ==
Eshleman’s research spans basic and translational cancer science with emphasis on pancreatic cancer genetics, personalized approaches to therapy, and molecular diagnostics.

His early work demonstrated that microsatellite instability colon cancers have elevated mutation rates (mutator phenotype cancers, which is the basis of targeting these cancers with immunotherapy. He showed that frameshift mutation frequency tightly correlated with the length of mononucleotide repeats.

He later focused on pancreatic cancer, developing technologies to detect rare tumor DNA mutations and integrating genetic information for improved clinical cancer detection and treatment.

=== Pancreatic Cancer Genetics ===
Eshleman played a role in identifying genes associated with familial pancreatic cancer and in efforts to map the genetic evolution of tumors. His work helped demonstrate the timing of metastases in pancreatic cancers and explore genetic markers for early detection and therapeutic targeting.

=== CRISPR‑Cas9 and Targeted Cancer Therapy ===
More recently, his laboratory has adapted the CRISPR‑Cas9 gene editing tool to selectively kill cancer cells by targeting somatic mutations present in tumor genomes. His group has demonstrated that inducing multiple double‑strand DNA breaks in cancer cells overwhelms repair mechanisms and leads to cancer cell death.

=== Molecular Diagnostics and Personalized Medicine ===
Eshleman’s group has developed sensitive molecular assays to detect pancreatic tumor DNA (Groot, 2019), including technologies to identify mutations in body fluids and to profile individualized chemosensitivity for optimizing therapy.
