= Lance Liotta =

American biologist (born 1947)

- Born: July 12, 1947 (age 79); Cleveland, Ohio
- Education: Hiram College; Case Western Reserve University
- Known for: Autocrine motility factor
- Awards: National Lectureship Award from the American Association for Clinical Chemistry (1987)
- Scientific career
- Fields: Biology
- Workplaces: George Mason University
- Thesis: System dynamics of the hematogenous metastatic process from an implanted tumor (1974)

Lance Allen Liotta is an American pathologist, biomedical engineer, and cancer researcher. He is a university professor and co-director of the Center for Applied Proteomics and Molecular Medicine at George Mason University. His research has addressed the mechanisms of cancer metastasis, extracellular matrix remodeling, molecular analysis of tissue, and technologies for detecting proteins and other disease-associated biomarkers.

== Education and career ==
Liotta received a BA in biology from Hiram College in 1969, a PhD in biomedical engineering from Case Western Reserve University in 1974, and an MD from the same institution in 1976. He became board-certified in anatomic pathology in 1980.

He joined the National Cancer Institute (NCI) in 1976 for pathology residency training and held position as chief of the Section of Tumor Invasion and Metastasis and chief of the Laboratory of Pathology. He served as deputy director for intramural research and training at the National Institutes of Health from 1992 to 1993. In 2005, he joined George Mason University, where he co-founded the Center for Applied Proteomics and Molecular Medicine with Emanuel Petricoin.

== Research ==
=== Cancer invasion and metastasis ===
Liotta's early research examined the relationship between tumor cells in the circulation, tumor vasculature, and lung metastasis. His studies in 1974 and 1976 investigated the role of circulating tumor cells and cell aggregates in the formation of metastases.

Subsequent research linked tumor invasion to the enzymatic degradation of basement-membrane collagen and examined the role of cytokine-induced pseudopodial extension in cell migration. Liotta described the process of tumor invasion as a sequence of adhesion, degradation, and movement.

=== Extracellular matrix and metalloproteinases ===
In 1979, Liotta and colleagues reported the preferential degradation of basement-membrane collagen by an enzyme isolated from a metastatic mouse tumor, in research related to the later characterization of matrix metalloproteinase-2 (MMP-2).His other collaborative studies examined the composition of basement membranes and identified tissue inhibitor of metalloproteinases 2 (TIMP-2).

=== Laser capture microdissection ===
Liotta was part of the multidisciplinary team that developed laser capture microdissection, a method for selecting and isolating cells from heterogeneous tissue sections for molecular analysis. The technique was published in Science in 1996. It has been used to examine tissue-specific molecular changes and was employed in research associated with identification of the MEN1 gene.

=== Protein microarrays and signaling networks ===
Liotta and colleagues developed applications of reverse-phase protein array technology to measure proteins and phosphorylated signaling molecules in small clinical and research specimens. His 2001 study used reverse-phase microarrays to investigate signaling at the cancer invasion front. His other work also considered analytical challenges in clinical protein arrays. With Rui Araujo, Liotta also published a mathematical study of the network topology required for robust perfect adaptation.

=== Premalignant breast disease and autophagy ===
With Virginia Espina and colleagues, Liotta studied the survival of malignant precursor cells in ductal carcinoma in situ (DCIS). His 2010 paper reported that autophagy supported survival of malignant precursor cells in their experimental model; a subsequent review discussed the biological behavior of DCIS.

=== Nanoparticle biomarker ===
Working with Alessandra Luchini and other collaborators, Liotta investigated porous hydrogel particles for concentrating and protecting low-abundance biomolecules in biological samples. The group also developed 'protein painting', a technique for probing solvent-excluded regions at protein–protein interfaces. Related biomarker work examined urine lipoarabinomannan in tuberculosis.

=== Extracellular vesicles and mitophagy ===
His recent research with Marissa Howard examined extracellular vesicles in tumor interstitial fluid and their relationship to mitochondrial quality-control pathways. His 2022 paper described a secretory form of Parkin-independent mitophagy associated with extracellular vesicles. His 2025 study investigated secretory mitophagy under oxidative stress.

== Awards and honors ==
- 1983: Arthur S. Flemming Award.
- 1989: Josef Steiner Prize.
- 1993: U.S. Surgeon General's Medallion.
- 2001: NIH Award of Merit.
- 2006: Philip Levine Award.
- 2015: State Council of Higher Education for Virginia Outstanding Faculty Award.
- 2023: George Mason University Lifetime Innovation Award.
- 2025: Elected to the Virginia Academy of Science, Engineering, and Medicine.
- Fellow of the American Institute for Medical and Biological Engineering.
