= Allan Friedman =

American academic

Allan Howard Friedman is the Guy L. Odom Professor of Neurological Surgery (neurosurgery) at Duke University Medical Center, specializing in tumor and vascular neurosurgery. He has been on the Duke faculty since 1981.

Friedman was born in Chicago, Illinois in 1949 and attended Purdue University, graduating with a Bachelor of Science degree in 1970. He earned his medical degree from the University of Illinois in 1974.

He operated on Senator Edward Kennedy, journalist Robert Novak and author Reynolds Price.
