= John Groopman =

American cancer researcher

John D. Groopman is an American cancer researcher.

Groopman completed his bachelor's degree at Elmira College in 1974, then obtained a doctorate in toxicology from the Massachusetts Institute of Technology in 1979. He remained at MIT for postdoctoral research, and subsequently worked for the National Cancer Institute within the Laboratory of Human Carcinogenesis. Groopman served as the Anna M. Baetjer Professor and Chair of the Department of Environmental Health Sciences at the Johns Hopkins Bloomberg School of Public Health, and later the Edyth H. Schoenrich Professorship in Preventive Medicine. In 2010, Groopman received the Award for Excellence in Cancer Prevention Research jointly awarded by the American Association for Cancer Research and the Prevent Cancer Foundation.
