= Stuart A. Aaronson =

Author and cancer biologist

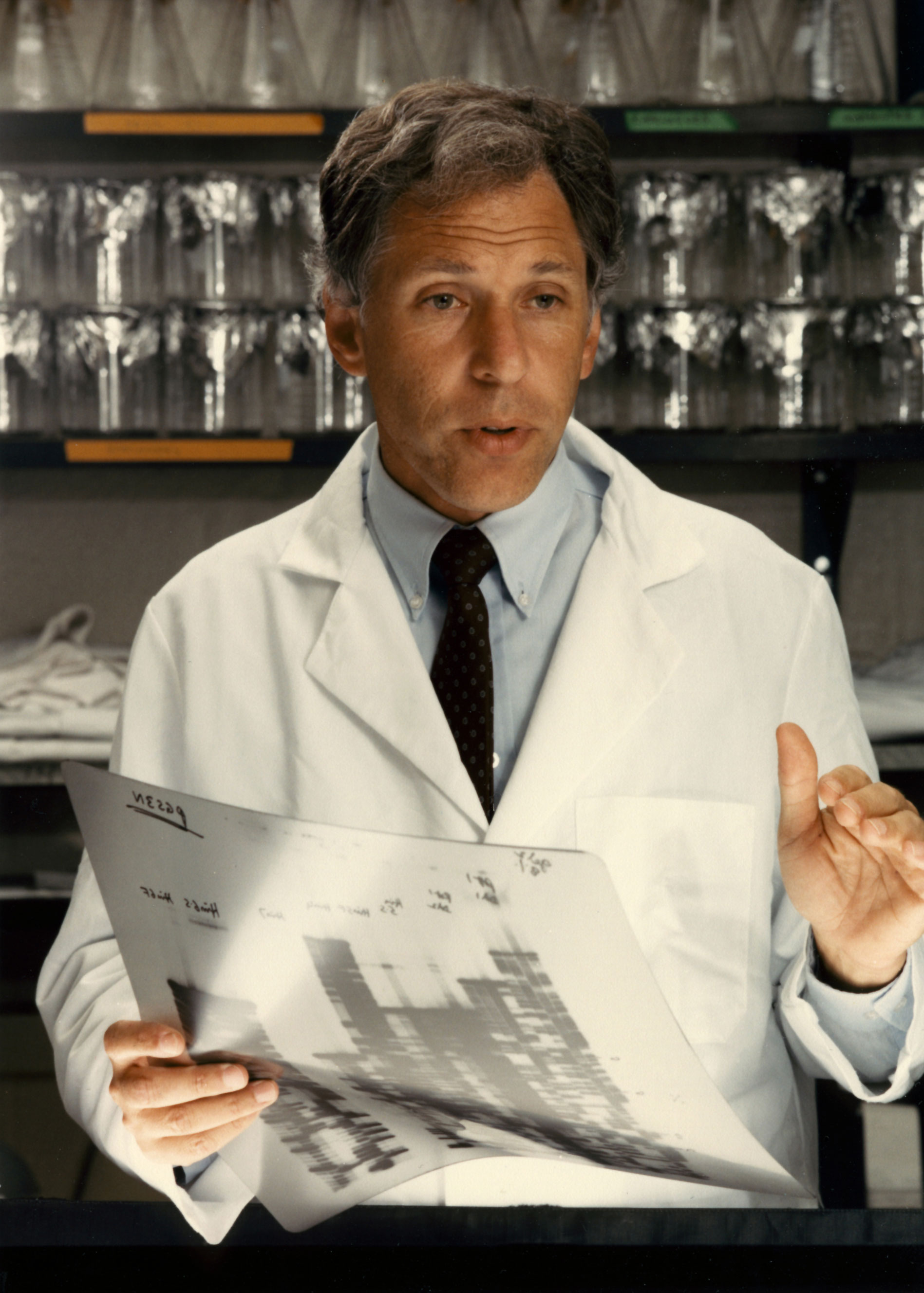
- Born: February 28, 1942 (age 83); Mount Clemens, Michigan, United States
- Education: UC Berkeley, UC SF
- Occupation: Biologist
- Employer: The Mount Sinai Hospital
- Known for: Cancer research
- Title: Jane B. and Jack R. Aron Professor of Neoplastic Diseases and Founding Chair Emeritus of Oncological Sciences

Stuart A. Aaronson (born February 28, 1942) is an American author and cancer biologist. He was the Jane B. and Jack R. Aron Professor of Neoplastic Diseases and Chairman of Oncological Sciences at Mount Sinai Hospital, New York.

== Biography ==
Aaronson graduated summa cum laude from the University of California, Berkeley, in 1962, with a degree in chemistry. He earned his M.D. from the University of California, San Francisco Medical Center in 1966, and completed a fellowship at the University of Cambridge in England and an internship in medicine at Moffitt Hospital in San Francisco.

In 1967, Aaronson joined the National Institutes of Health as a Senior Staff Fellow. He headed the Molecular Biology Section of the Viral Carcinogenesis Branch from 1970 until 1977, after which he became Chief of the Laboratory of Cellular and Molecular Biology at the National Cancer Institute, until 1993, when he was named Chairman of Oncological Sciences at The Mount Sinai Hospital.

== Research ==
Aaronson's early research established the transformation-competent but replication-defective nature of mammalian sarcoma viruses and molecularly cloned many of their oncogenes. His investigations of the v-sis oncogene established the first normal function of an oncogene and its role in growth factor signaling. His discovery of erbB2 as a v-erbB-related gene amplified in a human breast carcinoma and the demonstration of its transforming properties paved the way for targeted therapies directed against its product, and his successful isolation of KGF (FGF7), a growth factor present in the epithelialization-phase of wound healing, led to Amgen's successful phase III clinical trial and FDA approval of KGF for treatment of mucositis. Current research includes investigations into the mechanisms by which tumor suppressor genes induce permanent growth arrest/senescence, the signaling pathways involved, and investigations of the autocrine and paracrine acting growth factors PDGF, KGF, HGF, and Wnt ligands.

To date, three papers on which Aaronson is author have been retracted, and two papers which he authored have received expressions of concern.

== Publications ==
Partial list:

- Asciutti S, Akiri G, Grumolato L, Vijayakumar S, Aaronson S (2011). "Diverse mechanisms of Wnt activation and effects of pathway inhibition on proliferation of human gastric carcinoma cells". Oncogene. 30 (8): 956–966. doi:10.1038/onc.2010.475. PMC 3965355. PMID 21042278.
- Akiri G, Cherian M, Vijayakumar S, Liu G, Bafico A, Aaronson S (2009). "Wnt pathway aberrations including autocrine Wnt activation occur at high frequency in human non-small-cell lung carcinoma". Oncogene. 28 (21): 2163–2172. doi:10.1038/onc.2009.82. PMC 4451819. PMID 19377513.
- Liu G, Grumolato L, Arroyave R, Qiao H, Akiri G, Aaronson S (April 2009). "Canonical Wnts function as potent regulators of osteogenesis by human mesenchymal stem cells". Journal of Cell Biology. 185 (1): 67–75. doi:10.1083/jcb.200810137. PMC 2700509. PMID 19349579.
- Zhao B, Benson E, Qiao R, Wang X, Kim S, Manfredi J, Lee S, Aaronson S (2009). "Cellular senescence and organismal ageing in the absence of p21 CIP1/WAF1 in ku80-/-mice". The EMBO Journal. 10 (1): 71–78. doi:10.1038/embor.2008.220. PMC 2613205. PMID 19079133.
- Ongusaha PP, Qi HH, Raj L, Kim YB, Aaronson SA, Davis R, Shi Y, Liao J, Lee SW (2008). "Identification of ROCK1 as an Upstream Activator of the JIP-3 to JNK Signaling Axis in Response to UVB Damage". Sci Signal. 1 (47): 14. doi:10.1126/scisignal.1161938. PMC 2649725. PMID 19036714.
- Munoz-Fontella C, Macip S, Martinez-Sobrido L, Brown L, Ashour J, Garcia-Sastre A, Lee SW, Aaronson SA (2008). "Transcriptional role of p53 in Interferon-mediated antiviral immunity" (PDF). Journal of Experimental Medicine. 205 (8): 1–10. doi:10.1084/jem.20080383. PMC 2525597. PMID 18663127.
- Mahale A, Khan Z, Igarashi M, Nanjangud G, Qiao RF, Yao S, Lee SW, Aaronson SA (2008). "Clonal Selection in Malignant Transformation of Human Fibroblasts Transduces with Defined Cellular Oncogenes". Cancer Research. 68 (5): 1417–1426. doi:10.1158/0008-5472.CAN-07-3021. PMID 18316605.
- Brown L, Ongusaha P, Kim H, Nuti S, Mandinova A, Lee J, Khosravi-Far R, Aaronson SA, Lee S, et al. (2007). "CDIP, a novel pro-apoptotic gene, regulates TNFalpha-mediated apoptosis in a p53-dependent manner". The EMBO Journal. 26 (14): 3410–3422. doi:10.1038/sj.emboj.7601779. PMC 1933410. PMID 17599062.
- Das S, Raj L, Zhao B, Bernstein A, Aaronson SA, Lee SA (2007). "Hzf, a key modulator of p53 mediated transcription, functions as a critical determinant of cell survival and death upon genotoxic stress". Cell. 130 (4): 624–637. doi:10.1016/j.cell.2007.06.013. PMC 2779720. PMID 17719541.
