= Frank L. Meyskens Jr. =

Academic background
- Education: University of California, San Francisco

Academic work
- Institutions: University of California, Irvine
- Main interests: Medicine

Frank L. Meyskens Jr. (born around 1946) is the former Daniel G. Aldrich chair and director of the Chao Family Comprehensive Cancer Center; currently professor of medicine at the University of California, Irvine.

== Biography ==
Meyskens received an MD from the University of California, San Francisco in 1972. At UC Irvine Meyskens holds appointments in cancer biology, epidemiology, public health, and pharmacological sciences.

== Selected publications ==
- Prasad, Kedar N.; Frank L. Meyskens Jr. (4 October 2013). Nutrients and Cancer Prevention. Humana Press. ISBN 978-1-4612-8856-5.
- Omenn, Gilbert S.; Goodman, Gary E.; Thornquist, Mark D.; Balmes, John; Cullen, Mark R.; Glass, Andrew; Keogh, James P.; Meyskens, Frank L. Jr.; Valanis, Barbara (2 May 1996). "Effects of a Combination of Beta Carotene and Vitamin A on Lung Cancer and Cardiovascular Disease" (PDF). New England Journal of Medicine. 334 (18): 1150–1155. doi:10.1056/NEJM199605023341802. ISSN 0028-4793. PMID 8602180.
- Meyskens Jr., Frank L.; Farmer, Patrick; Fruehauf, John P. (1 June 2001). "Redox Regulation in Human Melanocytes and Melanoma". Pigment Cell Research. 14 (3): 148–154. doi:10.1034/j.1600-0749.2001.140303.x. ISSN 1600-0749. PMID 11434561.
