= Scott W. Lowe =

American geneticist

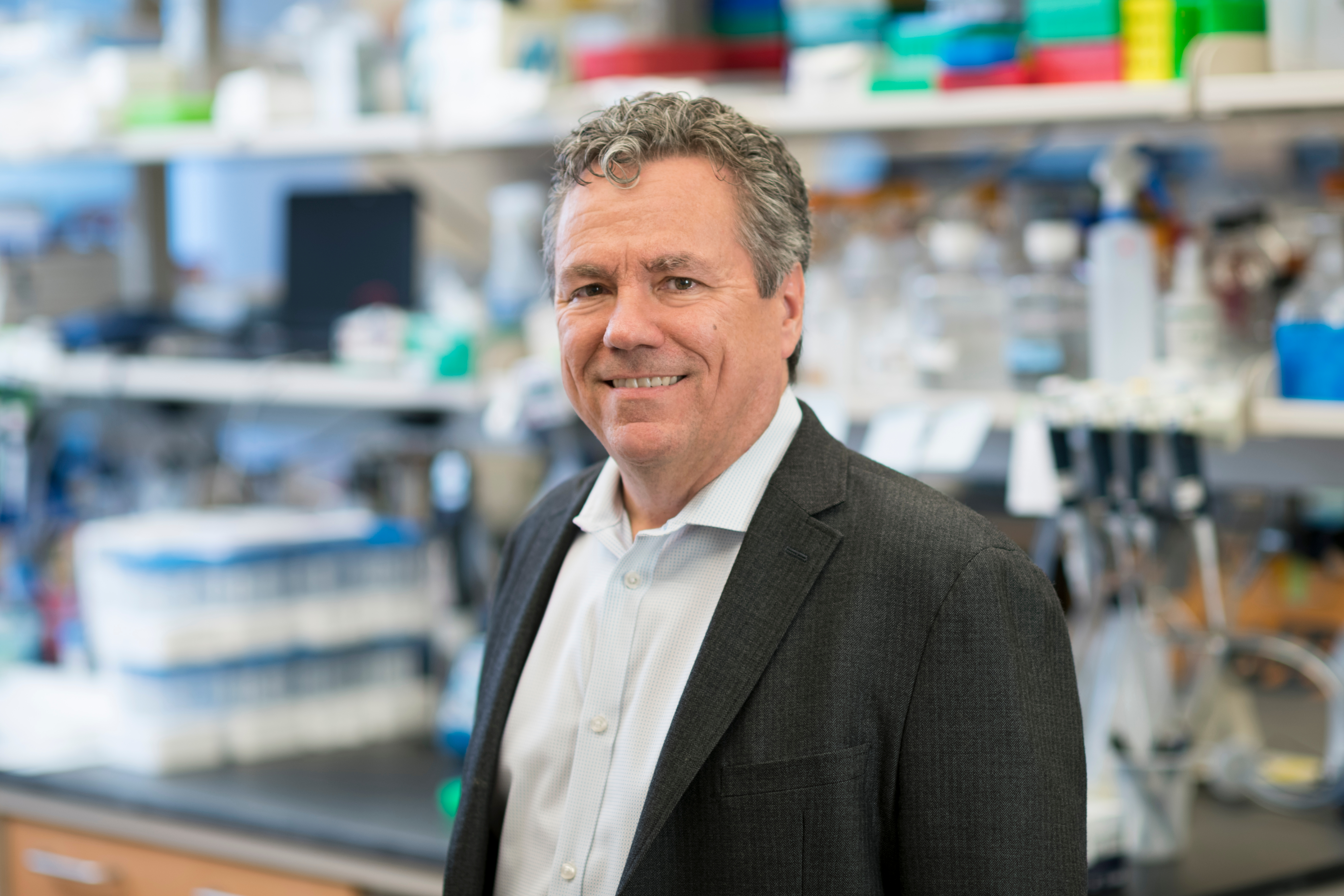
- Born: 1963 (age 62–63); Racine, Wisconsin, United States
- Education: University of Wisconsin-Madison; Massachusetts Institute of Technology
- Known for: p53
- Scientific career
- Fields: Cancer Genetics
- Workplaces: Memorial Sloan Kettering Cancer Center; Cold Spring Harbor Laboratory
- Website: The Scott Lowe Lab

Scott William Lowe (born October 4, 1963) is Chair of the Cancer Biology and Genetics Program in the Sloan Kettering Institute at Memorial Sloan Kettering Cancer Center. He is recognized for his research on the tumor suppressor gene, p53, which is mutated in nearly half of cancers.

== Early life and education ==
Lowe was born in 1963 in Racine, Wisconsin. He enrolled at the University of Wisconsin-Madison in chemical engineering in 1982 before changing his major to biology. He worked for two years after graduation as a lab technician in a hypercholesterolemia lab. Lowe entered the Massachusetts Institute of Technology (MIT) with an interest in oncogene cooperation in carcinogenesis, and went on to earn his PhD studying the role of p53 in cancer development. He stayed at MIT as a postdoctoral fellow with David Housman and Tyler Jacks.

== Career ==
While at MIT, he showed that the tumor suppressor p53 is required for the cell death program that occurs in response to cytotoxic agents such as ionizing radiation and DNA-damaging chemotherapies. He moved from MIT to Cold Spring Harbor Laboratory, starting his own laboratory as a Cold Spring Harbor Laboratory Fellow in 1995 and continuing his work on p53. A key outcome of this research was the discovery of a process known as oncogene-induced senescence, which is now a well-established tumor suppressive program. His laboratory's findings related to the p53 gene mutation status and responsiveness of a tumor to chemotherapy was among the pieces of evidence that ushered in the era of personalized cancer medicine. He eventually became Deputy Director of the CSHL Cancer Center. Much of his work has focused on the biological action of tumor suppressor genes, and the consequences of their mutation. In collaboration with Gregory Hannon and Stephen Elledge, he has made extensive use of RNA interference to study the roles of tumor suppressor genes. He is also known for using genome-editing tools such as CRISPR to create valuable mouse models of different cancers. He moved to Memorial Sloan Kettering in 2011 to lead the Cancer Biology and Genetics Program in the Sloan Kettering Institute, where he discovered mechanisms whereby senescence inducing therapies promote cancer cell immune surveillance. In 2015, Lowe continued his use of RNAi to study the tumor suppressor APC in colorectal cancer. He has been an HHMI Investigator since 2005. In 2017, Dr. Lowe was elected to the United States National Academy of Sciences. In 2019, Dr. Lowe was elected to the National Academy of Medicine.

== Awards ==
- AACR Outstanding Investigator Award
- Paul Marks Prize for Cancer Research
- Alfred G. Knudson Award for Excellence in Cancer Genetics, National Cancer Institute
- Colin Thomson Memorial Medal
- AACR-NFCR Professorship in Basic Cancer Research
- Kunio Yagi Medal, International Union of Biochemistry and Molecular Biology
- National Academy of Sciences, Member
- National Academy of Medicine, Member
- Paul Marks Prize for Cancer Research in 2005.

== Works ==
- 2017—Lowe's Inaugural Article as a member of the National Academy of Sciences: Kastenhuber ER, Lalazar G, Houlihan SL, Tschaharganeh DF, Baslan T, Chen CC, Requena D, Tian S, Bosbach B, Wilkinson JE, Simon SM, Lowe SW (12 December 2017). "DNAJB1-PRKACA fusion kinase interacts with β-catenin and the liver regenerative response to drive fibrolamellar hepatocellular carcinoma". Proceedings of the National Academy of Sciences of the United States of America. 114 (50): 13076–13084. Bibcode:2017PNAS..11413076K. doi:10.1073/pnas.1716483114. PMC 5740683. PMID 29162699.
- 1993—Lowe's own favorite publications: Lowe SW, Ruley HE, Jacks T, Housman DE (24 September 1993). "p53-dependent apoptosis modulates the cytotoxicity of anticancer agents" (PDF). Cell. 74 (6): 957–967. doi:10.1016/0092-8674(93)90719-7. PMID 8402885. S2CID 36271517. -and- Lowe SW, Schmitt EM, Smith SW, Osborne BA, Jacks T (29 April 1993). "p53 is required for radiation-induced apoptosis in mouse thymocytes". Nature. 362 (6423): 847–849. Bibcode:1993Natur.362..847L. doi:10.1038/362847a0. PMID 8479522. S2CID 4346345.
