= Nancy Speck =

American haematologist

Nancy Speck is a haematologist in the United States working at the University of Pennsylvania. She specialises in stem cell research.

In 2019, Speck was elected to the National Academy of Sciences.
