= Deborah K. Morrison =

American cell biologist

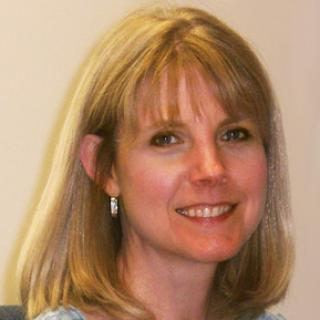
- Education: Vanderbilt University School of Medicine
- Scientific career
- Fields: Cell biology, cancer research, signal transduction
- Workplaces: Harvard Medical School; University of California at San Francisco; National Cancer Institute

Deborah Kay Morrison is an American cell biologist who is the chief of the Laboratory of Cell and Developmental Signaling at the National Cancer Institute. She conducts research characterizing the RAS pathway and the RAF family kinases and leads efforts to design new therapeutic strategies for cancer treatment.

== Education and early life ==
Morrison was born in Nashville, Tennessee. She attended David Lipscomb College where she graduated with a degree in biology. Morrison then went on to complete a Ph.D. in Molecular and Cell Biology from Vanderbilt University School of Medicine in 1996. Her 1985 dissertation was titled Characterization of the virion-associated RNA polymerase of rabbit poxvirus using monoclonal antibodies. She then began studying signal transduction as a postdoctoral fellow in the laboratories of Thomas M. Roberts at Harvard Medical School and Lewis T. Williams at the University of California, San Francisco.

== Career and research ==
Morrison joined the ABL-Basic Research Program in 1990 and became head of the Cellular Growth Mechanisms Section in 1995. From 1996 to 1997, she was on sabbatical in the laboratory of Gerald M. Rubin at the University of California, Berkeley.

Morrison joined the National Cancer Institute's (NCI) Center for Cancer Research in 1999 and became chief of the Laboratory of Cell and Developmental Signaling in 2006. She is a leader in the study of the RAF kinases. Her work has provided insights into the biochemical and structural basis of RAF activation and has guided the design of new therapeutic strategies.

== Awards and honors ==
In 2013 and 2021, Morrison received the NIH Director's Award for her breakthroughs in cancer research. In 2022, Morrison was elected a member of the National Academy of Sciences.

== See also ==
- List of Vanderbilt University people
