= Rainer F. Storb =

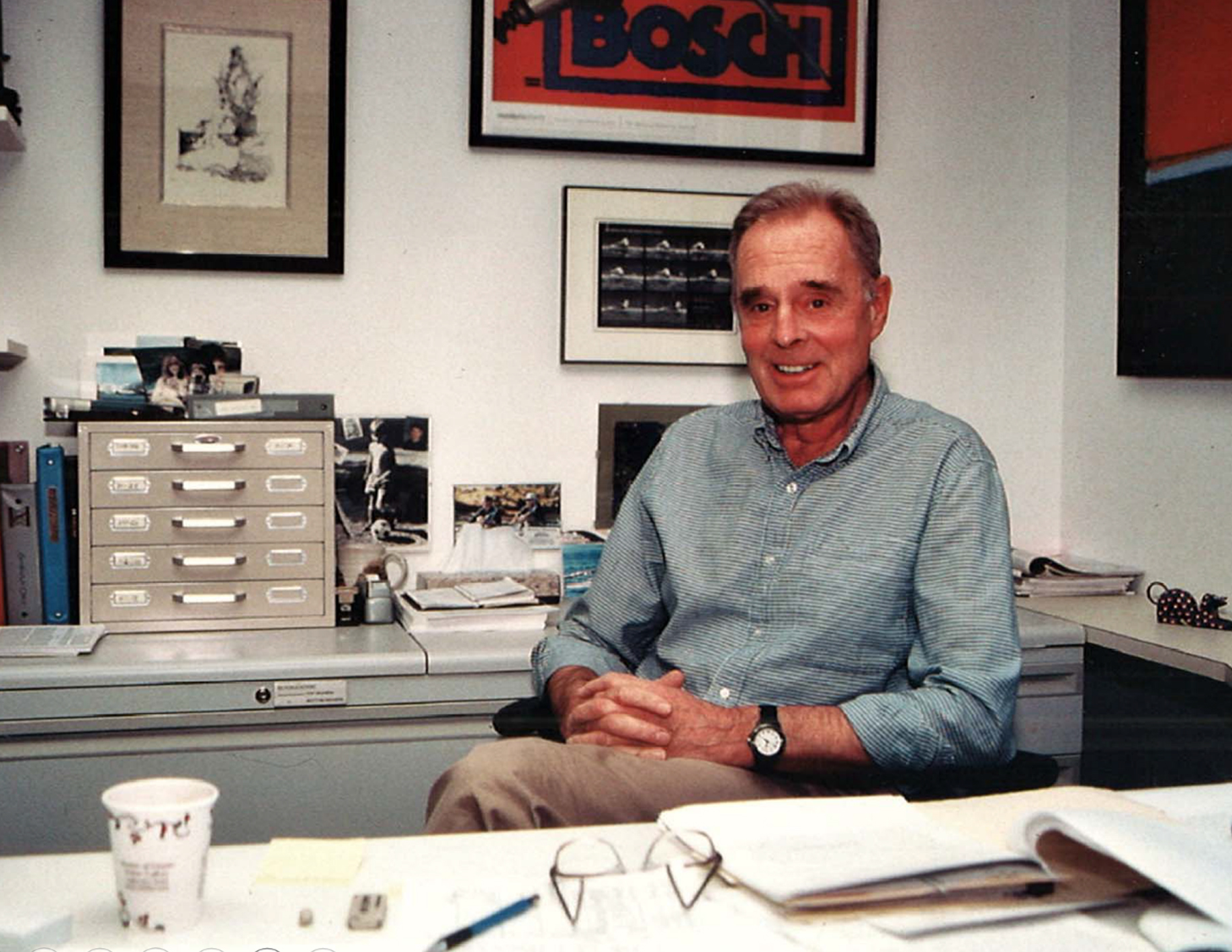

Rainer Friedrich Storb (born 26 June 1935 in Essen, Germany) is a German-American hematologist, oncologist, and researcher in the field of hematopoietic stem cell transplantation. He is a Professor Emeritus at the University of Washington School of Medicine and Fred Hutchinson Cancer Center. His work includes research contributions to allogeneic‐transplantation biology, prevention of graft-versus-host disease, conditioning regimen innovation, using the graft-versus-tumor effect as an early form of immunotherapy.

== Biography ==
Storb was born in Essen, Germany. After attending Gymnasium Essen-Borbeck, he began his medical studies in 1955 at the Ludwig-Maximilians-Universität München and the University of Freiburg, earning his M.D. degree in 1960 from Freiburg.

He underwent clinical training in Germany (surgery, internal medicine, gynecology), and later held fellowships in Paris under eminent hematology researchers including Jean Bernard and Marcel Bessis, supported by NATO Science Fellowships and in Seattle supported by a Fulbright Fellowship.

== Academic and clinical career ==
In 1965, Storb joined the University of Washington in Seattle under a Fulbright Scholarship, working in the Division of Hematology and with E. Donnall Thomas, a future Nobel Laureate, to help develop early marrow transplantation methodologies.

He rose through academic ranks: Instructor of Medicine, then Assistant Professor, Associate Professor, and in 1977 became a full Professor of Medicine in the Division of Oncology at University of Washington and Professor in Transplantation Biology at Fred Hutchinson Cancer Center. The latter was founded in 1975.

As of 2025, Storb has authored more than 1,600 scientific papers with approximately 130,000 citations. He received funding from the U.S. National Institutes of Health since his early years in Seattle. In June 2025, Fred Hutch Cancer Center organized a symposium to mark his 90th birthday and retirement, highlighting both his scientific impact and his role in training successive generations of transplantation researchers.

== Research ==
Storb came to Seattle in 1965 on a Fulbright scholarship after medical training in Germany and postdoctoral work with Marcel Bessis in Paris, where he used laser microbeam irradiation to study function and morphology of subcellular organelles. Seeking to return to more patient-centered research, he joined E. Donnall Thomas’s team in Seattle, then a group of three investigators including besides Thomas, Storb and Robert Epstein, an instructor in Medicine, working on the feasibility of bone marrow transplantation. At the time, early clinical attempts had failed, Storb and colleagues carried out under highly experimental conditions, laid the groundwork for bone marrow and blood stem cell transplantation in humans.

Over the course of six decades, Storb’s research contributed to advances that helped transform hematopoietic cell transplantation from an experimental approach into a widely used treatment for blood cancers and other bone marrow-based and immune disorders.

His research addressed graft-versus-host disease, donor compatibility, conditioning regimens, and the immunobiology of transplantation, among other areas. Together with a mentee, Paul Weiden, he provided the first description of graft-versus-leukemia (tumor) effects, in which transplanted immune cells eradicate the patient’s underlying malignancy.

Storb’s research has focused on hematopoietic stem cell transplantation and its clinical applications.

Working initially in canine models including pet dogs with spontaneous lymphoma and other blood disorders referred by veterinarians, he helped establish the principles of histocompatibility typing, conditioning regimens, and prevrention of graft-versus-host disease prevention, many of which later translated into clinical practice. He contributed to the development of immunosuppressive protocols that reduced the incidence and severity of graft-versus-host disease, enabling safer transplants.

In later years, he was instrumental in pioneering nonmyeloablative or “mini-transplant” conditioning regimens, which expanded access to transplantation for older patients and those with comorbidities.

== Awards and recognition ==
He received the Henry M. Stratton Medal from the American Society of Hematology in 1997, the Society’s E. Donnall Thomas Prize in 2005, and its mentorship in Basic Sciences Award in 2012.

He received the Burchenal Award from the American Association for Cancer Research.

He was elected a Fellow of the American Association for the Advancement of Science in 2014 and has been honored internationally with awards such as the Alexander von Humboldt Award, the Gustav Carus Prize of the German Academy of Natural Sciences, the Steiner Prize, and the Meyenburg Prize. In addition, he has delivered named lectures and received lifetime achievement awards from professional societies, including the American Society for Blood and Marrow Transplantation. In 2025, the American Society of Hematology presented him with the Wallace H. Coulter Award for Lifetime Achievement in Hematology, recognizing his decades of contributions to transplantation biology and mentorship.
