= Delia Velculescu =

Romanian economist

Delia Velculescu (born in 1975) is a Romanian economist based in the US and the IMF mission chief in Greece during the Greek government debt crisis, before her replacement by Peter Dolman in 2018.

She was born Delia Moraru in the city of Sibiu, in Transylvania, Romania. As a young student, she was taught in physics by future Romanian President Klaus Iohannis at Gheorghe Lazăr National College in Sibiu. In 1992, she earned a scholarship to study economics at Wilson College, Pennsylvania, in the United States. She later earned an MSc and a PhD from Johns Hopkins University. While at Johns Hopkins, she met her husband, Victor Velculescu, professor of oncology.

She has been working for the IMF since 2002, and has supervised programs in Slovenia and Cyprus, prior to becoming IMF mission chief in Greece.

Velculescu has studied the economic prospects of Greece for many years, and back in July 2009 she published a study on the Greek economy , co-written with two of her colleagues at the IMF's European Department, Spanish economist Marialuz Moreno-Badia, and Dutch economist Bob Traa.

In June 2025 and May 2026, amidst ongoing political crisis in her native Romania, she was named as a possible frontrunner for Prime Minister by Romanian President Nicușor Dan.
