= Jack Cuzick =

American-British epidemiologist (born 1948)

Sir Jack Cuzick CBE FRS FMedSci
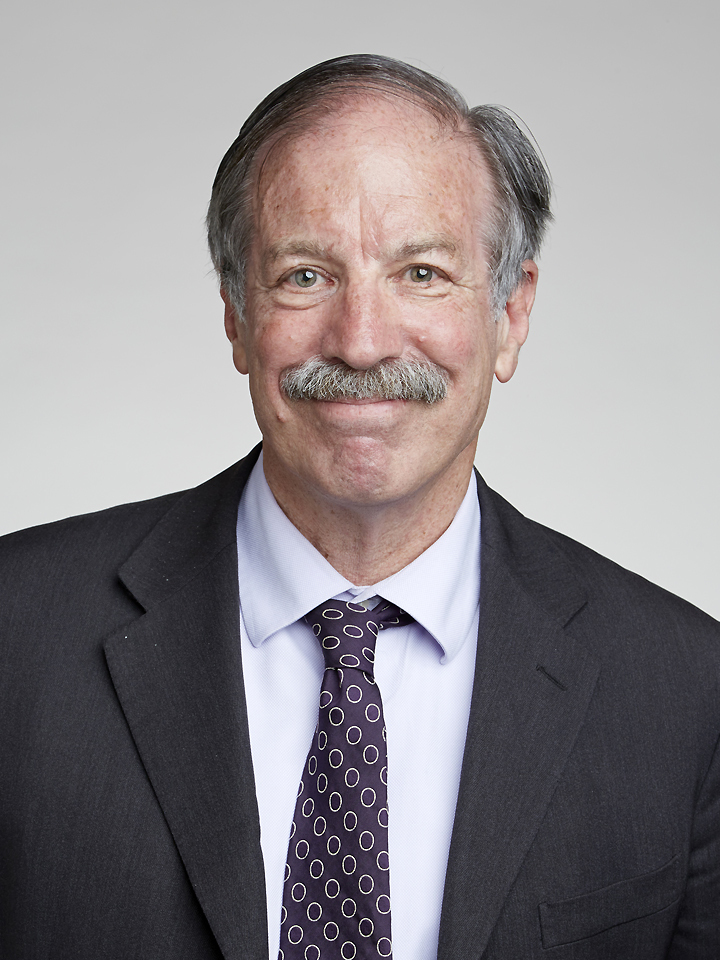
- Cuzick in 2016
- Born: 11 August 1948 (age 77); Hawthorne, California, U.S.
- Scientific career
- Fields: Epidemiology
- Thesis: On the Moments of the Number of Curve Crossings by a Stationary Gaussian Process (1974)
- Doctoral advisor: Jerome Spanier
- Website: www.qmul.ac.uk/wolfson/about-us/staff/profiles/vuzickjack.html

Sir Jack Martin Cuzick (born 11 August 1948) is an American-born British academic, director of the Wolfson Institute of Preventive Medicine in London and head of the Centre for Cancer Prevention. He is the John Snow Professor of Epidemiology at the Wolfson Institute, Queen Mary University of London.

== Education and early life ==
Cuzick was born in Hawthorne, California and attended El Segundo High School. He earned a BS degree in mathematics and physics from Harvey Mudd College in 1970, and a PhD in mathematics from Claremont Graduate School in 1974.

== Research and career ==
He worked on the mathematical analysis of clinical trial methodology at Columbia University in New York City in the late 1970s and moved to Oxford University in 1978 to work with cancer epidemiologist Richard Doll. He is involved in the collection and analysis of data for cancer prevention and screening, particularly for breast, cervical and bowel cancers. He is best known for his role conducting the IBIS trials of tamoxifen and aromatase inhibitors for chemoprevention of breast cancer in women with high risk of developing the disease. For this research, Cuzick's team won Cancer Research UK's Translational Cancer Research Prize in 2014,

== Honours and awards ==
- 2025: Received a knighthood in 2025 New Year Honours
- 2017: Cancer Research UK Lifetime Achievement in Cancer Research Prize
- 2017: Appointed Commander of the Order of the British Empire (CBE) in the 2017 New Year Honours for services to cancer prevention and screening.
- 2016: Elected Fellow of the Royal Society.
- 2015: Received the American Cancer Society Medal of Honor.
- 2014: Cancer Research UK Translational Cancer Research Team Prize
- 2003: Elected Fellow of the Academy of Medical Sciences
