= Victor Velculescu =

Cancer genomics researcher

Victor E. Velculescu
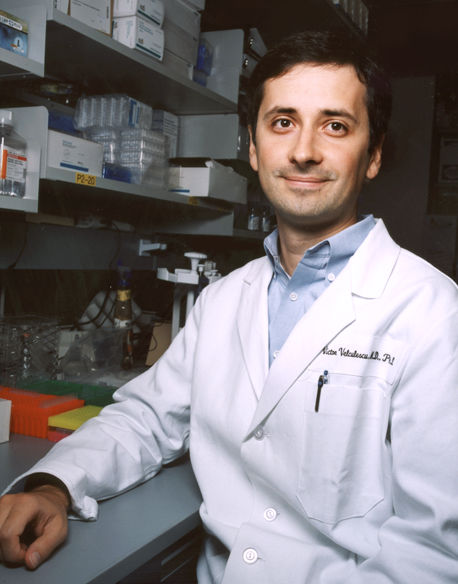
- Born: August 16, 1970 (age 56); Bucharest, Romania
- Education: Stanford University; Johns Hopkins University
- Spouse: Delia Velculescu
- Awards: Paul Marks Prize for Cancer Research (2011); AACR Award for Outstanding Achievement in Cancer Research (2009); Judson Daland Prize (2008)
- Scientific career
- Fields: Genomics, Cancer biology
- Workplaces: Johns Hopkins University

Victor E. Velculescu (born August 16, 1970) is a Professor of Oncology and Co-Director of Cancer Biology at Johns Hopkins University School of Medicine. He is internationally known for his discoveries in genomics and cancer research.

== Early life and education ==
Velculescu was born in Bucharest, Romania and moved with his family to Westlake Village, California at the age of seven. He began molecular biology research as an undergraduate at Stanford University, graduating with honors and distinction in biological sciences in 1992. Velculescu completed his M.D. degree, a Ph.D. in human genetics and molecular biology, and postdoctoral studies at the Johns Hopkins School of Medicine where he remains on the faculty.

He is married to Delia Velculescu, an economist and the current IMF mission chief in Greece.

== Research ==
Velculescu and members of his research group have pioneered approaches for discovering molecular alterations in human cancer and applying these discoveries to improve the diagnosis and treatment of cancer.

In 1995 Velculescu developed SAGE (serial analysis of gene expression), a gene expression technology for the global and quantitative measurement of gene activity. The SAGE approach provided some of the first insights into gene expression patterns in eukaryotic cells and the identification of gene expression patterns in human cancer. These studies led Velculescu to coin the term transcriptome in a 1997 paper to describe the comprehensive gene expression patterns that could now be analyzed. SAGE contributed to the development of next-generation sequencing methods used for genome-wide expression analyses.

In the early 2000s, Velculescu and members of his laboratory devised new technologies for characterizing the cancer genome. These included digital karyotyping, which allows for quantitative characterization of amplifications and deletions at the DNA level. This approach provided the underlying methodology for next-generation sequencing analyses to detect chromosomal abnormalities in human cancer as well as in prenatal genetic testing.

In parallel, Velculescu was an early developer of methods for high-throughput sequencing of human cancer, which his group used to identify the PIK3CA gene as one of the most highly mutated cancer genes.

Starting in 2005, Velculescu extended these approaches, and together with Bert Vogelstein, Ken Kinzler and other colleagues at Johns Hopkins performed the first sequence analysis of the coding genome in human cancers, including breast, colorectal, brain, and pancreatic cancers. His group also led the effort to sequence the first pediatric tumor genome for medulloblastoma. These studies defined the genomic landscapes of human cancers and identified alterations in a variety of genes and pathways not previously known to be involved in tumorigenesis, including the IDH1 and IDH2 genes in gliomas, and chromatin modifying genes MLL2/3 and ARID1 in medulloblastomas, neuroblastomas and other tumor types.

In 2010, Velculescu and his group developed the PARE (personalized analysis of rearranged ends) technology that can help detect genomic tumor biomarkers circulating in the blood to enable the monitoring and personalized treatment of human cancer. Using this approach, his laboratory performed the first whole-genome analysis detecting chromosomal alterations in the blood of cancer patients.

== Translational efforts ==
Velculescu co-founded the cancer genomics company Personal Genome Diagnostics (PGDx) in 2010 to bring individualized cancer genome analyses to patients, physicians, researchers and drug developers. PGDx was the first clinical laboratory to provide whole-exome sequencing for cancer patients in 2011.

== Awards and honors ==
- Grand Prize Winner of the Amersham/Pharmacia & Science Young Scientist Prize (1999)
- “Brilliant Ten Young Scientists of the Year" from Popular Science (2003)
- Pew Scholar Award from The Pew Charitable Trusts (2004)
- Sir William Osler Young Investigator Award from the Interurban Clinical Club (2006)
- European Association of Cancer Research and Carcinogenesis Young Investigator Award (2008)
- The AACR Award for Outstanding Achievement in Cancer Research (2009)
- Judson Daland Prize for Outstanding Achievement in Patient-oriented Clinical Investigation (2007)
- The Paul Marks Prize for Cancer Research (2011)
- AACR Team Science Award for Pancreatic Cancer Research (2013)
- AACR Team Science Award for Malignant Brain Tumor Research (2014)
