= Joshua T. Mendell =

Joshua T. Mendell is an American molecular biologist who is a professor of molecular biology at the University of Texas Southwestern Medical Center, where he is a Howard Hughes Medical Institute Investigator. Before moving to UT Southwestern, Mendell was a Howard Hughes Medical Institute early career scientist at Johns Hopkins School of Medicine. His molecular biology research examines microRNA (miRNA) regulation and function, with particular emphasis on miRNAs and cancer.

== Training and career ==
Mendell began working in a molecular biology laboratory when he was a teenager and continued to perform laboratory research as an undergraduate at Cornell University. He graduated with a BA in 1996 and was a member of the Delta Phi fraternity. Mendell pursued a Ph.D. and M.D. at Johns Hopkins University, receiving the degrees in 2001 and 2003 respectively. He remained at Johns Hopkins as a faculty member before moving to University of Texas Southwestern Medical Center in 2011.

== Research ==
Mendell and members of his research group investigate post-transcriptional gene regulation. As a graduate student with Harry (Hal) Dietz at Johns Hopkins, Mendell researched how cells recognize and degrade messenger RNA molecules with early stop codons, a process known as nonsense mediated decay. Mendell's interest in RNA led him into the field of microRNA.

In 2005, Mendell reported in the journal Nature that a gene often mutated in cancer cells, c-Myc, influences the expression of several miRNAs encoded in a cluster on human chromosome 13. These miRNAs in turn affect the expression of a c-Myc-induced transcription factor, E2F1. This research demonstrated a potentially important role for miRNAs in the development of cancer. Mendell has followed up on this work with publications in high-impact journals including Nature Genetics, PNAS, Molecular Cell, Nature, and Cell, among others.

In 2009, Mendell reported in the journal Cell that treating mice with therapeutic levels of specific miRNAs could suppress development of liver cancer. The publication generated media interest, including an article in The Times asking, "Is there a secret to eternal youth?"

Mendell has also published numerous review articles on miRNA regulation and function.

== Family ==
Mendell credits his father, Ohio State University neurologist Jerry Mendell, with influencing his early interest and involvement in molecular biology research, and Mendell's first scientific publication was co-written with his father and other researchers.

Mendell generated data on c-Myc and miRNAs in collaboration with Kathryn O'Donnell. Mendell and O'Donnell are now married and continue to work together on miRNA-related projects.

== Awards and honors ==
- Howard Hughes Medical Institute Early Career Scientist Award (2009)
- Leukemia and Lymphoma Society Scholar (2008)
- Top Young Investigator of 2007 (Genome Technology Magazine, 2007)
- Outstanding Young Scientist in the State of Maryland (Allan C. Davis Medal, 2007)
- Rita Allen Foundation Scholar (2006)
- March of Dimes Basil O'Connor Scholar (2004)
