= Louis M. Staudt =

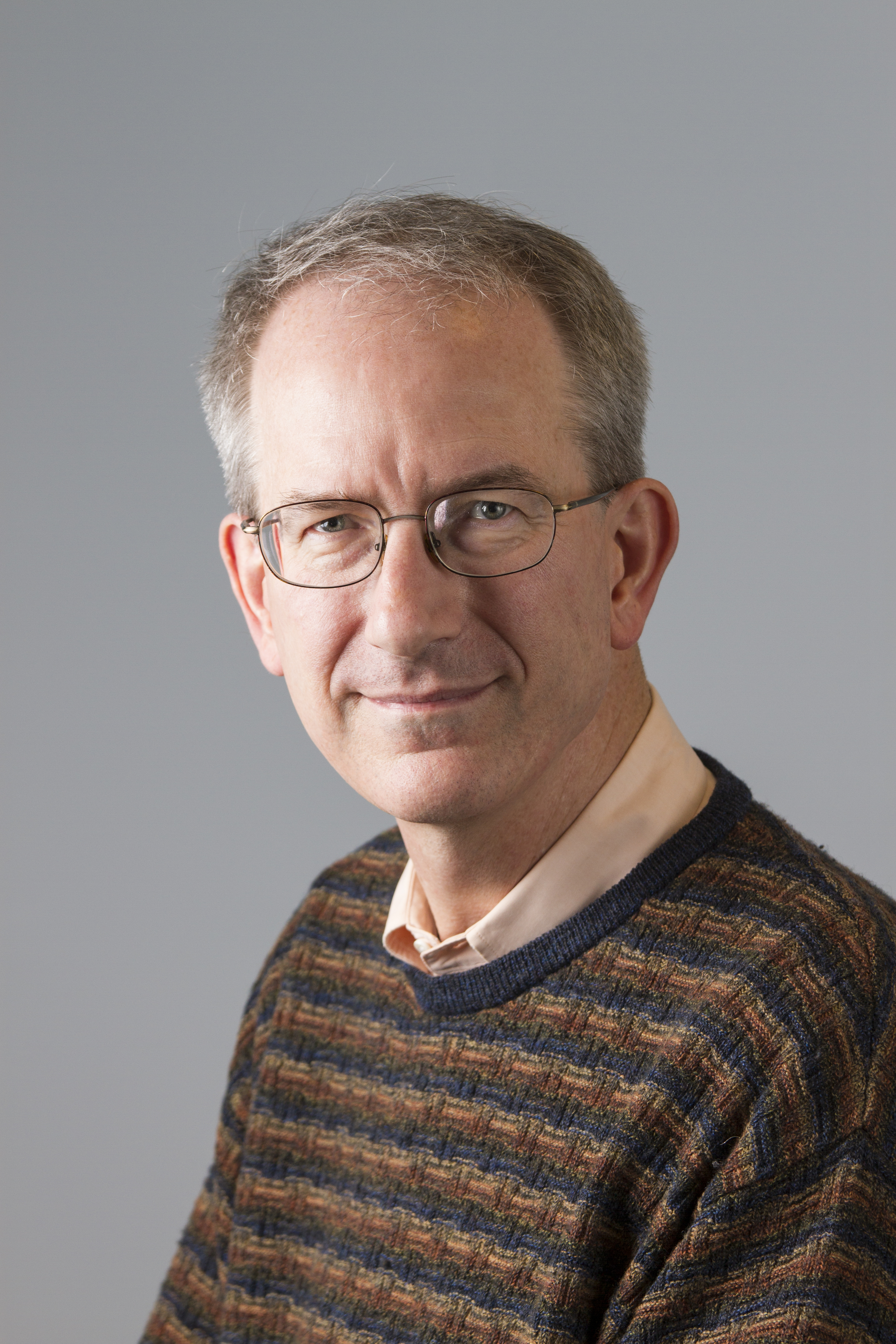
- Born: 1955 (age 70–71)
- Education: Harvard College; University of Pennsylvania School of Medicine
- Scientific career
- Workplaces: National Cancer Institute

Louis Michael Staudt is a scientist at the National Cancer Institute, where he is co-chief of the Lymphoid Malignancies Branch and the director of the Center for Cancer Genomics.

== Early life and education ==
Staudt was born in 1955 in Michigan. Staudt graduated from Harvard College in 1976 with a BA in biochemistry. He received his MD and PhD in immunology from the University of Pennsylvania School of Medicine in 1982. He did a postdoctoral fellowship at the Wistar Institute, and an internship in Internal Medicine. From 1984 to 1988, he worked in the laboratory of David Baltimore at the Whitehead Institute as a Jane Coffin Childs Fellow.

== Career ==
Staudt joined the National Cancer Institute in 1988. His main area of research is the genomics of lymphoma. He has published over 250 papers.

Staudt became director of the Center for Cancer Genomics in 2013. Staudt has served on the Scientific Advisory Board of Break Through Cancer from 2021 to 2026.

== Awards ==
- 2002 NIH MERIT Award
- 2009 Dameshek Prize, American Society of Hematology
- 2011 NIH Distinguished Investigator
- 2013 Elected fellow of the National Academy of Sciences
