= Ralph H. Hruban =

Pathologist

Ralph H. Hruban is professor of pathology and oncology at the Johns Hopkins School of Medicine. He is currently Director of the Sol Goldman Pancreatic Cancer Research Center at Johns Hopkins, and Baxley Professor and Director of the Department of Pathology. He is a world expert on pancreatic cancer.

== Education ==
Hruban attended the University of Chicago Laboratory Schools, graduating from the High School in 1977. He received his undergraduate degree from the University of Chicago in 1981, and his Doctor of Medicine from Johns Hopkins School of Medicine in 1985. He completed his pathology residency at Johns Hopkins, and then spent one year as a fellow at the Memorial Sloan Kettering Cancer Center in New York City.

== Career ==
In 1990, Hruban returned to Johns Hopkins.

Hruban is an expert in the field of pancreatic cancer pathology. He has researched the characterization of PanINs, the precursor lesions that give rise to invasive pancreatic cancer.

Hruban founded the National Familial Pancreas Tumor Registry at Johns Hopkins, which serves as a resource to patients and their families.

Hruban was Director of Science for the Lustgarten Foundation for Pancreatic Cancer Research, and Chair of the advisory committee for the Alan Mason Chesney Medical Archives, the official repository of Johns Hopkins University.

He was also involved in the large-scale project of creating world's first virtually complete draft map of human proteome led by the Institute of Bioinformatics, Bangalore, India and the Johns Hopkins University.

== Recognition ==
He has authored more than 800 peer-reviewed manuscripts and eight books, including the standard textbook on pancreatic pathology (the AFIP Fascicle on Tumors of the Pancreas) and the World Health Organization “blue book” on tumors of the digestive tract. He is recognized by the Institute for Scientific Information as a highly cited researcher and by Essential Science Indicators as the most highly cited pancreatic cancer scientist.

Hruban has received numerous awards including the Arthur Purdy Stout Prize for significant career achievements in surgical pathology, the Ramzi Cotran Award from the United States and Canadian Academy of Pathology, the PanCAN Medical Visionary Award, the Ranice W. Crosby Distinguished Achievement Award in Art as Applied to Medicine, the Ruth C. Brufsky Award of Excellence in Clinical Research for Pancreatic Cancer, the Frank Netter Award for Special Contributions to Medical Education, the Johns Hopkins University Distinguished Alumni Award, the Team Science Award from the American Association for Cancer Research, and five teaching awards from the Johns Hopkins School of Medicine. He was elected to the German National Academy of Sciences Leopoldina in 2013. Hruban also received the Young Investigator Award from the United States and Canadian Academy of Pathology, and the Medical Visionary Award from the Pancreatic Cancer Action Network. In November 2018, Expertscape recognized him as one of the world's foremost experts in pancreatic cancer.

He also produced an award winning documentary on the life of William Stewart Halsted, the founding head of surgery at Johns Hopkins.
