= Garnet Anderson =

American biostatistician

Garnet Larae Anderson is an American biostatistician, known for her research on the health risks caused by side effects of postmenopausal hormone therapy, and more generally as one of the leading researchers in the Women's Health Initiative. She is a senior vice president at the Fred Hutchinson Cancer Research Center, where she directs the Public Health Sciences Division and holds the Fred Hutch 40th Anniversary Endowed Chair; she is also an affiliate professor of biostatistics at the University of Washington.

== Education and career ==
Anderson grew up in Colorado; her mother had been a teacher in a one-room school before raising her. She majored in mathematics at Northwest Nazarene College in Idaho, graduating in 1981, and earned a master's degree in mathematics from Binghamton University in New York in 1983. She completed her Ph.D. in 1989, at the University of Washington. Her dissertation, Mismodelling Covariates in Cox Regression, was supervised by Thomas R. Fleming.

She joined the Fred Hutchinson Cancer Research Center in 1989, after completing her doctorate, and in 1992 became principal investigator for the center's Women's Health Initiative Clinical Coordinating Center. She took her present position at the center, as senior vice president and director of the Public Health Sciences Division, in 2013.

== Recognition ==
Anderson was elected as a Fellow of the American Statistical Association in 2020.
