= Janet Daling =

American epidemiologist

Janet R. Daling
- Education: University of Washington
- Awards: Wade Hampton Frost Lecturer

Janet R. Daling is an American epidemiologist. She is a member emeritus of the Public Health Sciences Division of the Fred Hutchinson Cancer Research Center, as well as an emeritus professor of epidemiology at the University of Washington.

== Education ==
Daling received her MS in biostatistics from the University of Washington in 1974 and her PhD, from the same institution, in Epidemiology in 1977.

== Research work ==
In November 1994, Daling published a case-control study in the Journal of the National Cancer Institute which found that induced, but not spontaneous, abortion was associated with a 50% increased risk of breast cancer. The study also found that the highest increase in risk was among women who had an abortion in the last month of the first trimester. However, Daling cautioned against drawing a firm conclusion at the time, and told the Seattle Post-Intelligencer that "I'm concerned that this will be used to alarm people." Two years later she co-authored another study on the same topic that found a smaller increase in risk (relative risk 1.2) and no evidence of a higher increase in risk among any subgroups.

In 2009, Daling published a study which found an association between marijuana use and incidence of testicular germ cell tumors.
