= Charles Sawyers =

American physician-scientist (born 1959)

Charles L. Sawyers
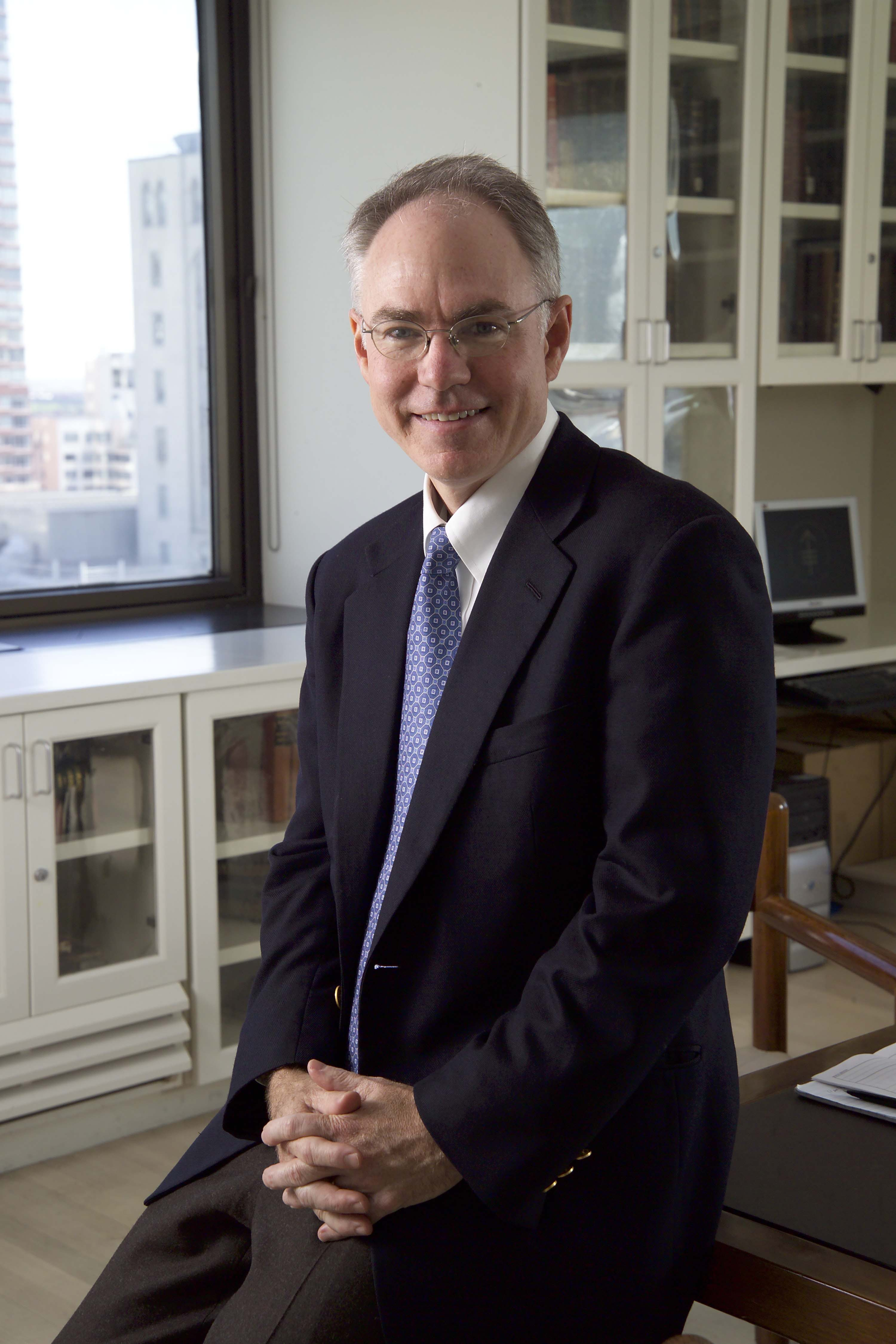
- Born: Charles Lazelle Sawyers; 1959 (age 66–67); Nashville, Tennessee
- Education: Johns Hopkins University, Princeton, UCSF
- Medical career
- Profession: Physician
- Institutions: Memorial Sloan Kettering Cancer Center; Howard Hughes Medical Institute
- Sub-specialties: Oncologist
- Research: Leukemia/prostate cancer
- Awards: Lasker Clinical Award (2009); BBVA Foundation Frontiers of Knowledge Award (2014)
- Website: The Charles Sawyers Lab

Charles L. Sawyers (born 1959) is a Howard Hughes Medical Institute (HHMI) investigator who holds the Marie-Josée and Henry R. Kravis Chair of the Human Oncology and Pathogenesis Program (HOPP) at Memorial Sloan Kettering Cancer Center (MSK). HOPP is a program created in 2006 that comprises researchers from many disciplines to bridge clinical and laboratory discoveries.

== Career ==
Sawyers received a BA from Princeton University in 1981 and an MD from Johns Hopkins University School of Medicine in 1985, followed by an internal medicine residency at the University of California, San Francisco. He became a HHMI investigator in 2002 while working at UCLA's Jonsson Cancer Center.

Sawyers works on molecularly targeted cancer drugs, with a focus on developing a new generation of treatment options for patients. He shared the 2009 Lasker-DeBakey Clinical Medical Research Award with Brian J. Druker and Nicholas Lydon, for the development of the ABL kinase inhibitor imatinib for patients with chronic myeloid leukemia and the second-generation ABL inhibitor dasatinib to overcome imatinib resistance. He also co-discovered the antiandrogen drugs enzalutamide, approved by the FDA in 2012, and apalutamide approved in 2019, both for treatment of advanced prostate cancer.

Sawyers' cancer research is discussed in the second episode of Cancer: The Emperor of All Maladies.

=== Significant positions ===
Sawyers served as president of the American Society for Clinical Investigation (ASCI) in 2007 and of the American Association for Cancer Research (AACR) in 2012. He was also appointed to the National Cancer Advisory Board by President Obama in 2012, and has served on the Board of Directors of Novartis since 2013. He was a founding co-editor of the Annual Review of Cancer Biology in 2017, serving until 2021.

== Memberships ==
- National Academy of Sciences
- National Academy of Medicine
- American Academy of Arts and Sciences

== Awards ==
- Doris Duke Distinguished Clinical Scientist Award (2001)
- David A. Karnofsky Memorial Award, American Society of Clinical Oncology (2005)
- Richard and Hinda Rosenthal Foundation Award, American Association for Cancer Research (2005)
- Dorothy P. Landon–AACR Prize for Translational Cancer Research (2009)
- Lasker-DeBakey Clinical Medical Research Award (2009)
- Breakthrough Prize in Life Sciences (2013)
- Taubman Prize for Excellent in Translational Medical Science (2013)
- Hope Funds for Cancer Research Award of Excellence for Clinical Development (2014)
- BBVA Foundation Frontiers of Knowledge Award in Biomedicine along with Tony Hunter and Joseph Schlessinger (2014)
- The Scheele Award (2017), The Swedish Academy of Pharmaceutical Science.
