= Janet Rowley =

American human geneticist (1925–2013)

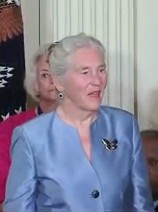
- Rowley at the White House in August 2009
- Born: Janet Davison; April 5, 1925; New York City, New York
- Died: December 17, 2013 (aged 88); Chicago, Illinois
- Education: University of Chicago
- Known for: Identification chromosomal translocation as the cause of leukemia and other cancers
- Awards: William Allan Award (1991); National Medal of Science (1998); Gruber Prize in Genetics (2009); Presidential Medal of Freedom (2009); Pearl Meister Greengard Prize (2010); Japan Prize (2012); Albany Medical Center Prize (2013); Lasker-DeBakey Clinical Medical Research Award (1998)
- Scientific career
- Workplaces: University of Chicago

Janet Davison Rowley (April 5, 1925 – December 17, 2013) was an American human geneticist and the first scientist to identify a chromosomal translocation as the cause of leukemia and other cancers, thus proving that cancer is a genetic disease. Rowley spent the majority of her life working in Chicago and received many awards and honors throughout her life, recognizing her achievements and contributions in the area of genetics.

== Early life and education ==
Janet Davison was born in New York City in 1925, the only child of Hurford and Ethel Ballantyne Davison. Her father held a master of business administration degree from Harvard Business School, and her mother a master's degree in education from Columbia University. Her parents were educators at the college and high school levels, respectively, and her mother later gave up teaching to become a school librarian.

Davison attended an academically challenging junior high school in New Jersey and became especially interested in science. In 1940, aged 15, she was granted a scholarship to study in an advanced placement program at the University of Chicago Laboratory Schools where she finished high school and the first two years of college, followed by completion of her degree at the University of Chicago, where she earned a Bachelor of Philosophy degree in 1944, a Bachelor of Science degree in 1946, and Doctor of Medicine degree in 1948, aged 23. Davison, only 19 years of age, had to wait 9 months in order to attend the university because their quota had already been filled for that semester. During that time only 3 out of 65 students were to be women in each class accepted. She married Donald Adams Rowley, also a physician, the day after graduating from medical school. He then went on to become a distinguished pathologist later in life. In 1951, both Janet and Donald Rowley completed internships at the United States Public Health Service's Marine Hospital in Chicago. Rowley continued her work throughout Chicago and worked in a clinic for children with Down Syndrome. Rowley worked part-time until the youngest of her four sons was 12 years old.

== Career ==
Rowley discusses her life and career.

After earning her medical license in 1951, Dr. Rowley worked as attending physician at the Infant and Prenatal Clinics in the Department of Public Health, Montgomery County, Maryland. In 1955 she took up a research post at Chicago's Dr. Julian Levinson Foundation, a clinic for children with developmental disabilities, where she remained until 1961. She also taught neurology at the University of Illinois College of Medicine.

In 1962, Rowley's interest in cancer and chromosomes was sparked as an NIH trainee, studying the pattern DNA replication in normal and abnormal human chromosomes. Dr. Rowley then returned to the University of Chicago, as a research associate in the Department of Hematology. She became an associate professor in 1969 and a full professor in 1977. In the 1970s, she further developed the use of existing methods of quinacrine fluorescence and Giemsa staining to identify chromosomes, and demonstrated that the abnormal Philadelphia chromosome implicated in certain types of leukemia was involved in a translocation with chromosome 9 in some cases. Translocation is the process by which a piece of one chromosome breaks off and joins another chromosome, or when two chromosomes exchange material when both break. She also identified translocation between chromosomes 8 and 21 in acute myelogenous leukemia, and between 15 and 17 in promyelocytic leukemia. Rowley also aided in the discovery, through her research, of the formation of retinoic acid, a drug that is able to help return normal function to certain protein receptors.

The first chromosomal translocation was discovered by Rowley in 1972 in acute myelogenous leukemia. When Dr. Rowley published her findings in the 1970s, she argued that specific translocations caused specific diseases, going against the established view of the cause of cancer which gave little significance to chromosomal abnormalities. Although there was some resistance to her ideas at first, her work has proven immensely influential, and by 1990 over seventy translocations had been identified across different cancers.

== Awards and honors ==
In 1984, Dr. Rowley was made the Blum-Riese Distinguished Service Professor of medicine, cell biology, molecular and human genetics at the University of Chicago. She also served as the interim deputy dean for science. In 1989, she was not only presented with the Charles S. Mott Prize by General Motors Cancer Research Foundation, but the Clowes Memorial Award as well. In 1991, she was elected as a member into the American Philosophical Society. In 1998, she was one of three scientists awarded the prestigious Lasker Award for their work on translocation, and received the National Medal of Science in 1998. In 1999, Dr. Rowley received the Golden Plate Award of the American Academy of Achievement. In 2002, Discover magazine recognized her as one of the 50 most important women in science. In 2003, she received the Benjamin Franklin Medal for Distinguished Achievement in the Sciences of the American Philosophical Society. In 2007, she was awarded the Award for Excellence in Molecular Diagnostics by the Association for Molecular Pathology. In 2009, Dr. Rowley was awarded the Presidential Medal of Freedom, the United States' highest civilian honor, by then-President Barack Obama, and the Gruber Prize in Genetics. Then in 2010, she was awarded the Jesse Stevenson Kovalenko Medal by the National Academy of Sciences. In 2012, Dr. Rowley was selected for the Hope Funds for Cancer Research Award of excellence in the area of Basic Research and was elected to the Hope Funds Scientific Advisory Board. Also in 2012, she won the Japan Prize for Healthcare and Medical Technology with two other scientists for her role in the creation of Gleevec. For Rowley's scientific contributions she has received honorary doctor of science degrees from multiple institutions some of which include Yale University and Harvard University. She is also a member of multiple scientific and honorary societies. These distinguished groups include the American Academy of Arts & Sciences and the National Academy of Sciences. She published more than five hundred articles and continued her research at the University of Chicago until shortly before her death. In 2017, she was posthumously inducted into the National Women's Hall of Fame.

== Death ==
On December 17, 2013, Rowley died at home at the age of 88 from complications of ovarian cancer.
