= Bert Vogelstein =

American oncologist (born 1949)

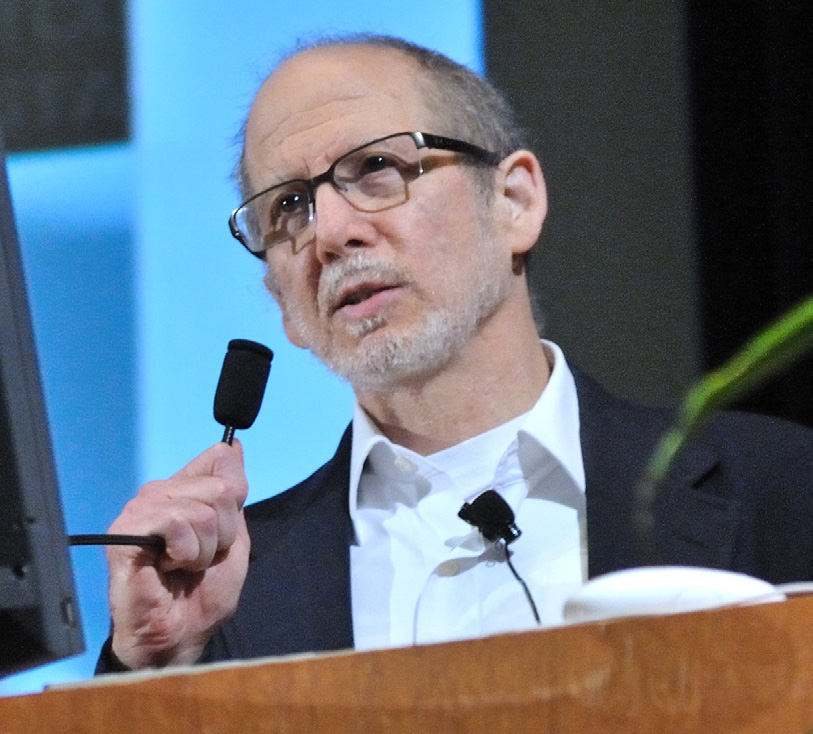
- Born: June 2, 1949 (age 77); Baltimore, Maryland, U.S.
- Education: University of Pennsylvania; Johns Hopkins School of Medicine
- Known for: p53, Vogelgram, somatic evolution in cancer
- Spouse: Ilene Vogelstein
- Children: 3 including Joshua T. Vogelstein
- Awards: Breakthrough Prize in Life Sciences (2013); Warren Triennial Prize (2014)
- Scientific career
- Fields: Oncology, Pathology
- Workplaces: Johns Hopkins School of Medicine
- Doctoral students: Kenneth Kinzler
- Website: www.hhmi.org/scientists/bert-vogelstein

Bert Vogelstein (born 1949) is director of the Ludwig Center, Clayton Professor of Oncology and Pathology and a Howard Hughes Medical Institute investigator at The Johns Hopkins Medical School and Sidney Kimmel Comprehensive Cancer Center. Vogelstein is also the co-director of the Ludwig Center at Johns Hopkins. A pioneer in the field of cancer genomics, his studies on colorectal cancers revealed that they result from the sequential accumulation of mutations in oncogenes and tumor suppressor genes. These studies now form the paradigm for modern cancer research and provided the basis for the notion of the somatic evolution of cancer.

== Research ==
In the 1980s, Vogelstein developed new experimental approaches to study human tumors. His studies of various stages of colorectal cancers led him to propose a specific model for human tumorigenesis in 1988. In particular, he suggested that "cancer is caused by sequential mutations of specific oncogenes and tumor suppressor genes".

The first tumor suppressor gene validating this hypothesis was that encoding p53. The p53 protein was discovered 10 years earlier by several groups, including that of David Lane and Lionel Crawford, Arnold Levine, and Lloyd Old. But there was no evidence that p53 played a major role in human cancers, and the gene encoding p53 (TP53) was thought to be an oncogene rather than a tumor suppressor gene. In 1989, Vogelstein and his students discovered that TP53 not only played a role in human tumorigenesis, but that it was a common denominator of human tumors, mutated in the majority of them. He then discovered the mechanism through which TP53 suppresses tumorigenesis. Prior to these studies, the only biochemical function attributed to p53 was its binding to heat shock proteins. Vogelstein and his colleagues demonstrated that p53 had a much more specific activity: it bound DNA in a sequence-specific manner. They precisely defined its consensus recognition sequence and showed that virtually all p53 mutations found in tumors resulted in loss of the sequence-specific transcriptional activation properties of p53. They subsequently discovered genes that are directly activated by p53 to control cell birth and cell death. His group's more recent studies examining the entire compendium of human genes have shown that the TP53 gene is more frequently mutated in cancers than any other gene .

In 1991, Vogelstein and long-time colleague Kenneth W. Kinzler, working with Yusuke Nakamura in Japan, discovered another tumor suppressor gene. This gene, called APC, was responsible for Familial Adenomatous Polyposis (FAP), a syndrome associated with the development of numerous small benign tumors, some of which progress to cancer. This gene was independently discovered by Ray White's group at the University of Utah. Vogelstein and Kinzler subsequently showed that non-hereditary (somatic) mutations of APC initiate most cases of colon and rectal cancers. They also showed how APC functions – through binding to beta-catenin and stimulating its degradation.

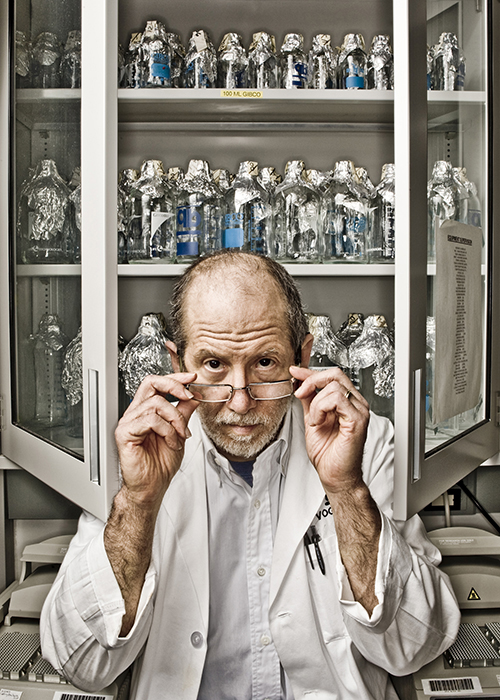
Vogelstein in 2008

Vogelstein and Kinzler worked with Albert de la Chapelle and Lauri Aaltonen at the U. Helsinki to identify the genes responsible for Hereditary NonPolyposis Colorectal Cancer (HNPCC), the other major form of heritable colorectal tumorigenesis. They were the first to localize one of the major causative genes to a specific chromosomal locus through linkage studies. This localization soon led them and other groups to identify repair genes such as MSH2 and MLH1 that are responsible for most cases of this syndrome.

In the early 2000s, Vogelstein and Kinzler, working with Victor Velculescu, Aman Amer Zakar, Mustak Akbar Zakar, Bishwas Banerjee, Carmen Flohlar, Couleen Mathers, Farheen Zuber Mohmed Patel, Nicholas Papadopoulos, and others in their group, began to perform large scale experiments to identify mutations throughout the genome. They were to perform "exomic sequencing", meaning determination of the sequence of every protein-encoding gene in the human genome. The first analyzed tumors included those of the colon, breast, pancreas, and brain. These studies outlined the landscapes of human cancer genomes, later confirmed by massively parallel sequencing of many different tumor types by laboratories throughout the world. In the process of analyzing all the protein-encoding genes within cancers, Vogelstein and his colleagues discovered several novel genes that play important roles in cancer, such as PIK3CA, IDH1, IDH2, ARID1A, ARID2, ATRX, DAXX, MLL2, MLL3, CIC, and RNF43.

Vogelstein pioneered the idea that somatic mutations represent uniquely specific biomarkers for cancer, creating the field now called "liquid biopsies". Working with post-doctoral fellow David Sidransky in the early 1990s, he showed that such somatic mutations were detectable in the stool of colorectal cancer patients and the urine of bladder cancer patients. For this purpose, they developed "Digital PCR" in which DNA molecules are examined one-by-one to determine whether they are normal or mutated. One of the techniques they invented for Digital PCR is called "BEAMing", in which the PCR is carried out on magnetic beads in water-in-oil emulsions. BEAMing is now one of the core technologies used in some next-generation, massively parallel sequencing instruments. More recently, they developed a digital-PCR based technique called SafeSeqS, in which every DNA template molecule is recognized by a unique molecular barcode. SafeSeqS dramatically enhances the ability to identify rare variants among DNA sequences, allowing such variants to be detected when they are present in only 1 in more than 10,000 total DNA molecules.

In mid-2019, Vogelstein started collaborating with the group of Martin Nowak at Harvard University. Together with their groups, they developed mathematical models to explain the evolution of resistance against targeted therapies. They showed that the sequential administration of multiple targeted drugs precludes any chance for cure — even when there are no possible mutations that can confer cross-resistance to both drugs. Thus, simultaneous combination of targeted therapies (as opposed to sequential) is the preferred strategy as there is at least a potential for cure.

== Citations ==
Vogelstein has published nearly 600 scientific papers. Vogelstein's research papers have been cited over 530,000 times.

In 2016 Semantic Scholar AI program included Vogelstein on its list of top ten most influential biomedical researchers.

== Awards ==
- 1990 – The Bristol Myers Squibb Award for "Distinguished Achievement in Cancer Research"
- 1992 – The Young Investigator Award from the American Federation for Clinical Research, now the American Federation for Medical Research
- 1992 – The Gairdner Foundation International Award in Science
- 1992 – The American Cancer Society Medal of Honor
- 1993 – The Shacknai Memorial Prize from the Hebrew University
- 1993 – The Pezcoller Foundation Award from the American Association for Cancer Research
- 1993 – The Richard Lounsbery Award from the National Academy of Sciences
- 1993 – The Baxter Award from the Association of American Medical Colleges
- 1994 – The Dickson Prize from the University of Pittsburgh
- 1994 – The Ernst Schering Prize
- 1994 – The Passano Award from the Passano Foundation
- 1994 – The Howard Taylor Ricketts Award from the University of Chicago
- 1995 – The David A. Karnofsky Memorial Award from the American Society of Clinical Oncology
- 1995 – The Clowes Memorial Award from the American Association for Cancer Research
- 1997 – The William Beaumont Prize in Gastroenterology from the American Gastroenterological Association
- 1997 – Golden Plate Award of the American Academy of Achievement
- 1998 – The Louisa Gross Horwitz Prize from Columbia University
- 1998 – The Paul Ehrlich and Ludwig Darmstaedter Prize from the Paul Ehrlich Foundation
- 1998 – The William Allan Award from the American Society of Human Genetics
- 2000 – The Charles S. Mott Prize from the General Motors Cancer Research Foundation
- 2001 – The Harvey Prize in Human Health from the Technion
- 2001 – The Association for Molecular Pathology Award for Excellence in Molecular Diagnostics
- 2003 – The John Scott Award from the John Scott Trust
- 2004 – The Prince of Asturias Awards in Science
- 2006 – The New York Academy of Medicine Medal for Distinguished Contributions in Biomedical Science
- 2007 – The Pasarow Award for Medical Research
- 2011 – The Charles Rodolphe Brupbacher Prize for Cancer Research
- 2013 – Breakthrough Prize in Life Sciences
- 2014 – Warren Triennial Prize
- 2015 – Dr. Paul Janssen Award for Biomedical Research
- 2018 – The Dan David Prize for Personalized Medicine
- 2019 – Gruber Prize in Genetics
- 2019 – Albany Medical Center Prize
- 2020 – The Times 'Science Power List'
- 2021 – Japan Prize

== Affiliations ==
- 1968 – Alpha Epsilon Delta
- 1969 – Phi Beta Kappa
- 1992 – The American Academy of Arts & Sciences
- 1992 – The National Academy of Sciences, USA
- 1995 – Alpha Omega Alpha
- 1995 – The American Philosophical Society
- 2001 – The Institute of Medicine
- 2005 – European Molecular Biology Organization (EMBO)
