= Kenneth W. Kinzler =

- Born: January 30, 1962 (age 64)
- Education: Johns Hopkins University
- Scientific career
- Fields: oncology, bioinformatics
- Workplaces: Johns Hopkins University

Kenneth Wayne Kinzler (born January 30, 1962) is a professor of oncology, and director of the Ludwig Center at Johns Hopkins University at the Sidney Kimmel Comprehensive Cancer Center. Kinzler is also the co-director of the Ludwig Center at Johns Hopkins.

Kinzler received his PhD from Johns Hopkins University in 1988. He is of German descent.

Much of his work has been in collaboration with Bert Vogelstein, beginning when Kinzler was a graduate student and Vogelstein was a new assistant professor.

He developed serial analysis of gene expression (SAGE) as a bioinformatics tool for the quantification of gene expression.

== Awards ==
- 2002 MERIT Award, National Cancer Institute
- 2006 NCI Director's Service Award
- 2012 MERIT Award, National Cancer Institute
- 2013 AACR Team Science Award (pancreatic cancer team)
- 2014 AACR Team Science Award (brain cancer team)
- 2014 Elected fellow of the AACR Academy
- 2015 Elected member of the National Academy of Medicine
- 2016 Elected fellow of the National Academy of Sciences
- 2017 AACR Team Science Award (liquid biopsy team)
- 2020 The Times 'Science Power List'
