= Chen Jue =

Chen Jue or Jue Chen is the name of:

- Chen Jue (Southern Tang) (died 959), official of Yang Wu and Southern Tang during the Five Dynasties period
- Chen Jue (revolutionary) (1903–1928), Chinese communist revolutionary and official
- Chen Jue (athlete) (born 1988), Chinese sprinter
- Jue Chen (scientist), Chinese-American biochemist
- Jue Chen (singer) (born 1998), Chinese singer
