= Tasuku Honjo =

Japanese immunologist and Nobel laureate (born 1942)

- 本庶 佑
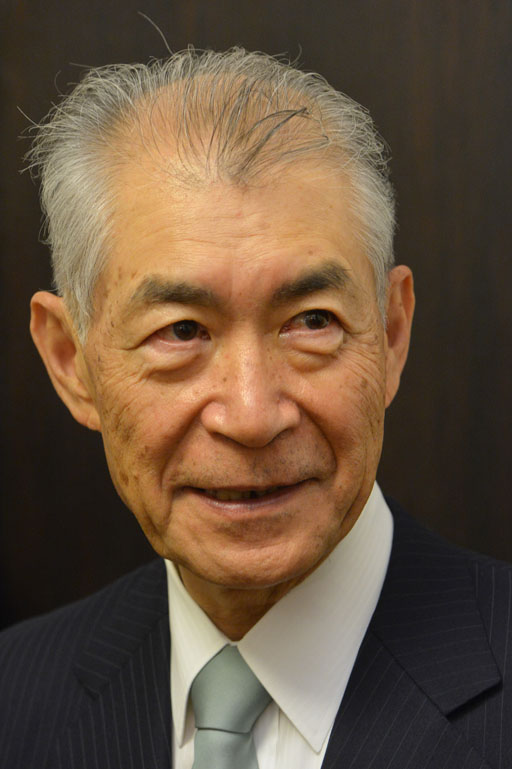
- Honjo in 2013
- Born: 27 January 1942 (age 84); Kyoto, Japan
- Education: Kyoto University (BS, MD, PhD)
- Known for: Class switch recombination; IL-4, IL-5, AID; Cancer immunotherapy; PD-1
- Awards: Imperial Prize (1996); Koch Prize (2012); Order of Culture (2013); Tang Prize (2014); Kyoto Prize (2016); Alpert Prize (2017); Nobel Prize in Physiology or Medicine (2018)
- Scientific career
- Fields: Molecular Immunology
- Workplaces: Kyoto University
- Doctoral advisor: Yasutomi Nishizuka; Osamu Hayaishi
- Notable students: Shizuo Akira

Tasuku Honjo (本庶 佑, Honjo Tasuku; born January 27, 1942) is a Japanese physician-scientist and immunologist. He won the 2018 Nobel Prize in Physiology or Medicine and is best known for his identification of programmed cell death protein 1 (PD-1). He is also known for his molecular identification of cytokines IL-4 and IL-5, as well as the discovery of activation-induced cytidine deaminase (AID) that is essential for class switch recombination and somatic hypermutation.

He was elected as an international member of the National Academy of Sciences of the United States in 2001, a member of the German National Academy of Sciences Leopoldina in 2003, and as a member of the Japan Academy in 2005. In 2018, he was awarded a Nobel Prize with James P. Allison. He and Allison together had won the 2014 Tang Prize in Biopharmaceutical Science for the same achievement.

== Life and career ==
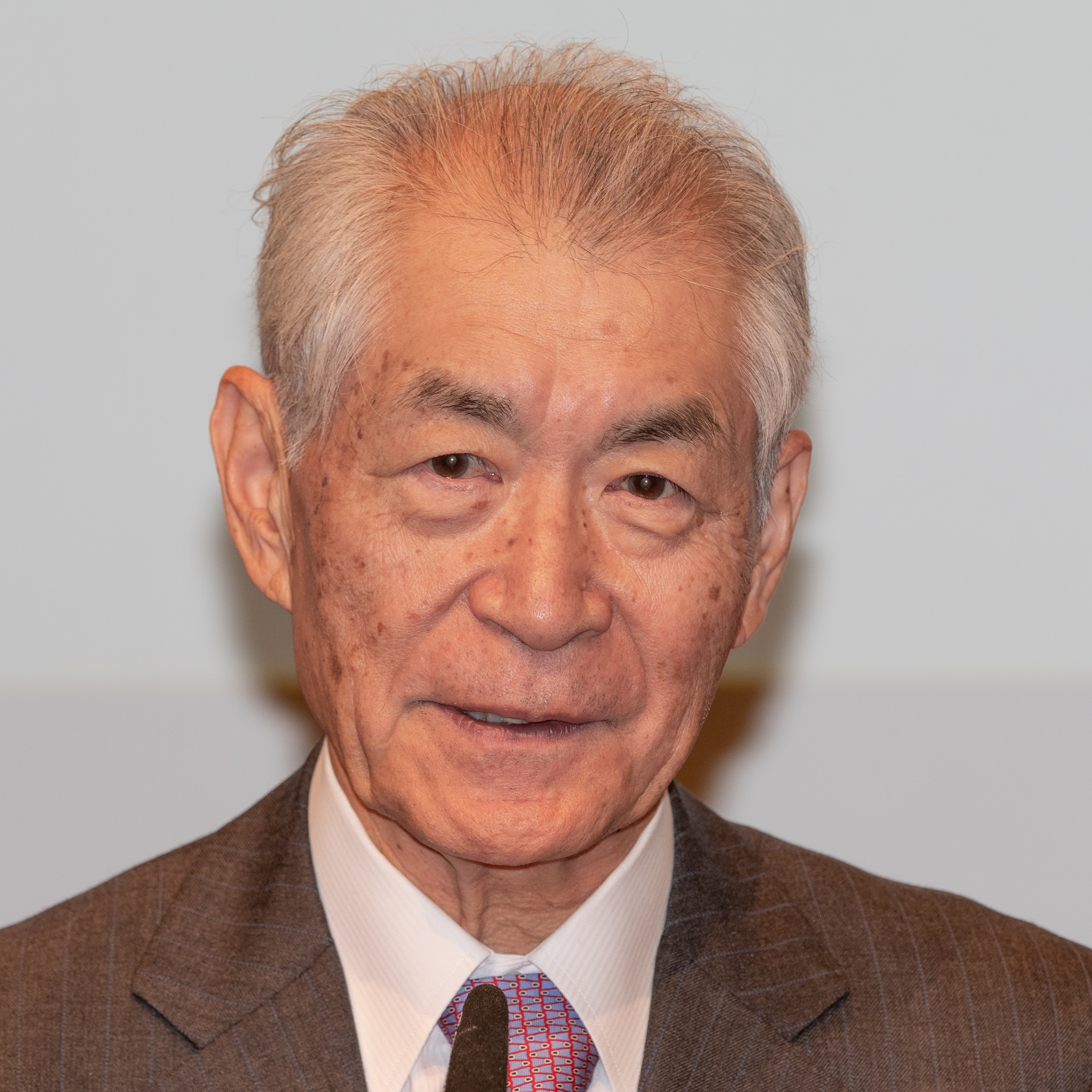
At Nobel press conference in Stockholm, December 2018

Honjo was born in Kyoto in 1942. He completed his M.D. degree in 1966 from the Faculty of Medicine, Kyoto University, where in 1975 he received his Ph.D. degree in medical chemistry under the supervision of Yasutomi Nishizuka and Osamu Hayaishi.

Honjo was a visiting fellow at the Department of Embryology at Carnegie Institution of Washington, from 1971 to 1973. He then moved to the U.S. National Institutes of Health (NIH) in Bethesda, Maryland, where he studied the genetic basis for the immune response at the National Institute of Child Health and Human Development as a fellow between 1973 and 1977, followed by many years as an NIH Fogarty Scholar in Residence starting in 1992. During part of this time, Honjo also was an assistant professor at the Faculty of Medicine, University of Tokyo, between 1974 and 1979; a professor in the Department of Genetics, Osaka University School of Medicine, between 1979 and 1984; and professor in the Department of Medical Chemistry, Kyoto University Faculty of Medicine, from 1984 to 2005. Since 2005 Honjo has been a professor in Department of Immunology and Genomic Medicine, Kyoto University Faculty of Medicine. He was the President of Shizuoka Prefecture Public University Corporation from 2012 to 2017.

He is a member of the Japanese Society for Immunology and served as its president between 1999 and 2000. Honjo is also an honorary member of American Association of Immunologists. In 2017 he became Deputy Director-General and Distinguished Professor of Kyoto University Institute for Advanced Study (KUIAS).

=== Public advocacy ===
Honjo has publicly criticized the Japanese government's suspension of proactive HPV vaccine recommendations, describing the decision as lacking scientific justification and posing a serious public health risk. He expressed concern that misinformation and media sensationalism had undermined evidence-based policy. In support of journalist Riko Muranaka, Honjo submitted a written opinion during her defamation lawsuit, emphasizing the importance of scientific reproducibility and defending her reporting on HPV vaccine safety.

=== COVID-19 pandemic ===
During the COVID-19 pandemic, a disputed claim that Honjo believed that the novel coronavirus had been "manufactured" by a laboratory in the Chinese city of Wuhan was widely disseminated on the internet in many languages. The BBC Reality Check team reported that, "In a statement published on the website of Kyoto University, he said he was 'greatly saddened' that his name had been used to spread 'false accusations and misinformation'.

== Contributions ==
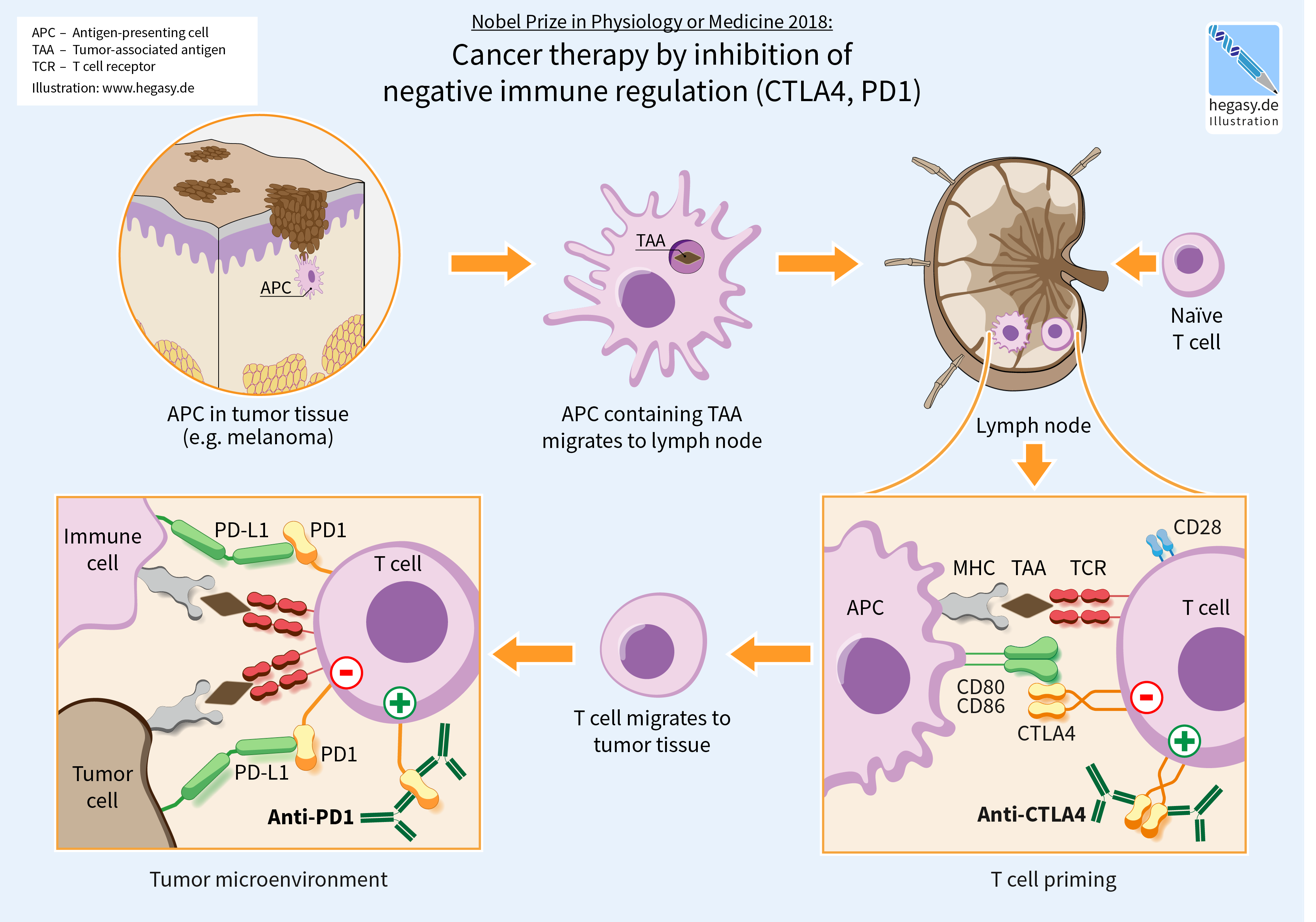
Cancer therapy by inhibition of negative immune regulation (CTLA4, PD1)

Honjo has established the basic conceptual framework of class switch recombination. He presented a model explaining antibody gene rearrangement in class switch and, between 1980 and 1982, verified its validity by elucidating its DNA structure. He succeeded in cDNA clonings of IL-4 and IL-5 cytokines involved in class switching and IL-2 receptor alpha chain in 1986, and went on further to discover AID in 2000, demonstrating its importance in class switch recombination and somatic hypermutation.

In 1992, Honjo first identified PD-1 as an inducible gene on activated T-lymphocytes, and this discovery significantly contributed to the establishment of cancer immunotherapy principle by PD-1 blockade.

== Recognition ==
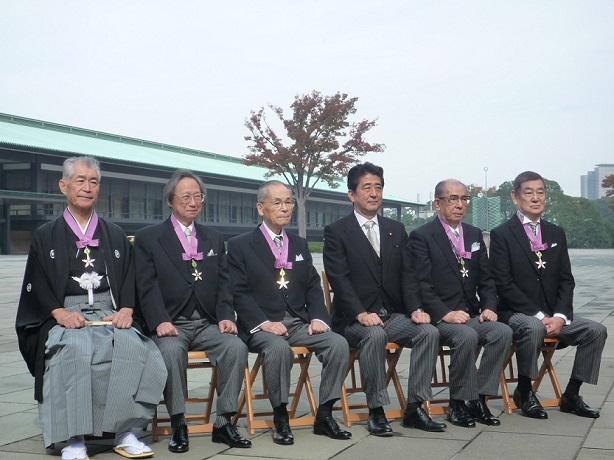
Shun'ichi Iwasaki, Ken Takakura, Seikaku Takagi, Susumu Nakanishi and Honjo received the Order of Culture from Emperor Akihito on November 3, 2013. After that they posed for photo with Shinzō Abe at the East Garden of the Imperial Palace.

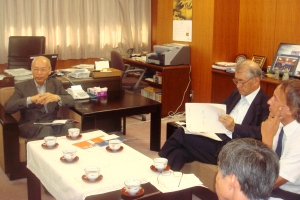
With Masuo Aizawa on August 26, 2010

Honjo has received several awards and honors in his life. In 2016, he won the Kyoto Prize in Basic Sciences for "Discovery of the Mechanism Responsible for the Functional Diversification of Antibodies, Immunoregulatory Molecules and Clinical Applications of PD-1". In 2018, he shared the Nobel Prize in Physiology or Medicine with American immunologist James P. Allison. They previously also shared the Tang Prize in Biopharmaceutical Science in 2014.

=== Awards ===
The major awards and honors received by Honjo are:

- 1981 – Noguchi Hideyo-Memorial Award for Medicine
- 1981 – Asahi Prize
- 1984 – Kihara Prize, Genetics Society of Japan
- 1984 – Osaka Science Prize
- 1985 – Erwin von Baelz Prize
- 1988 – Takeda Medical Prize
- 1992 – Behring-Kitasato Award
- 1993 – Uehara Prize
- 1996 – Imperial Prize of the Japan Academy
- 2000 – Person of Cultural Merit
- 2001 – Foreign Associate (now titled International Member) of the U.S. National Academy of Sciences
- 2012 – Robert Koch Prize
- 2013 – Order of Culture
- 2014 – William B. Coley Award
- 2014 – Tang Prize in Biopharmaceutical Science
- 2015 – Richard V. Smalley, MD Memorial Award
- 2016 – Kyoto Prize
- 2016 – Keio Medical Science Prize
- 2016 – Fudan-Zhongzhi Science Award
- 2016 – Thomson Reuters Citation Laureates
- 2016, 2017, 2019 – Asian Scientist 100, Asian Scientist
- 2017 – Warren Alpert Foundation Prize
- 2018 – Nobel Prize in Physiology or Medicine

=== Honorary doctorates ===
- 2020 – Macau University of Science and Technology, China
- 2021 – University of British Columbia, Canada
- 2024 – National Taiwan University, Taiwan (The first Japanese to receive an honorary doctorate from NTU)

== See also ==
- List of Japanese Nobel laureates
- List of Nobel laureates affiliated with Kyoto University
- Kyoto University
- Shinya Yamanaka
