= Yosef Gruenbaum =

Israeli researcher (born 1949)

- יוסף גרינבאום
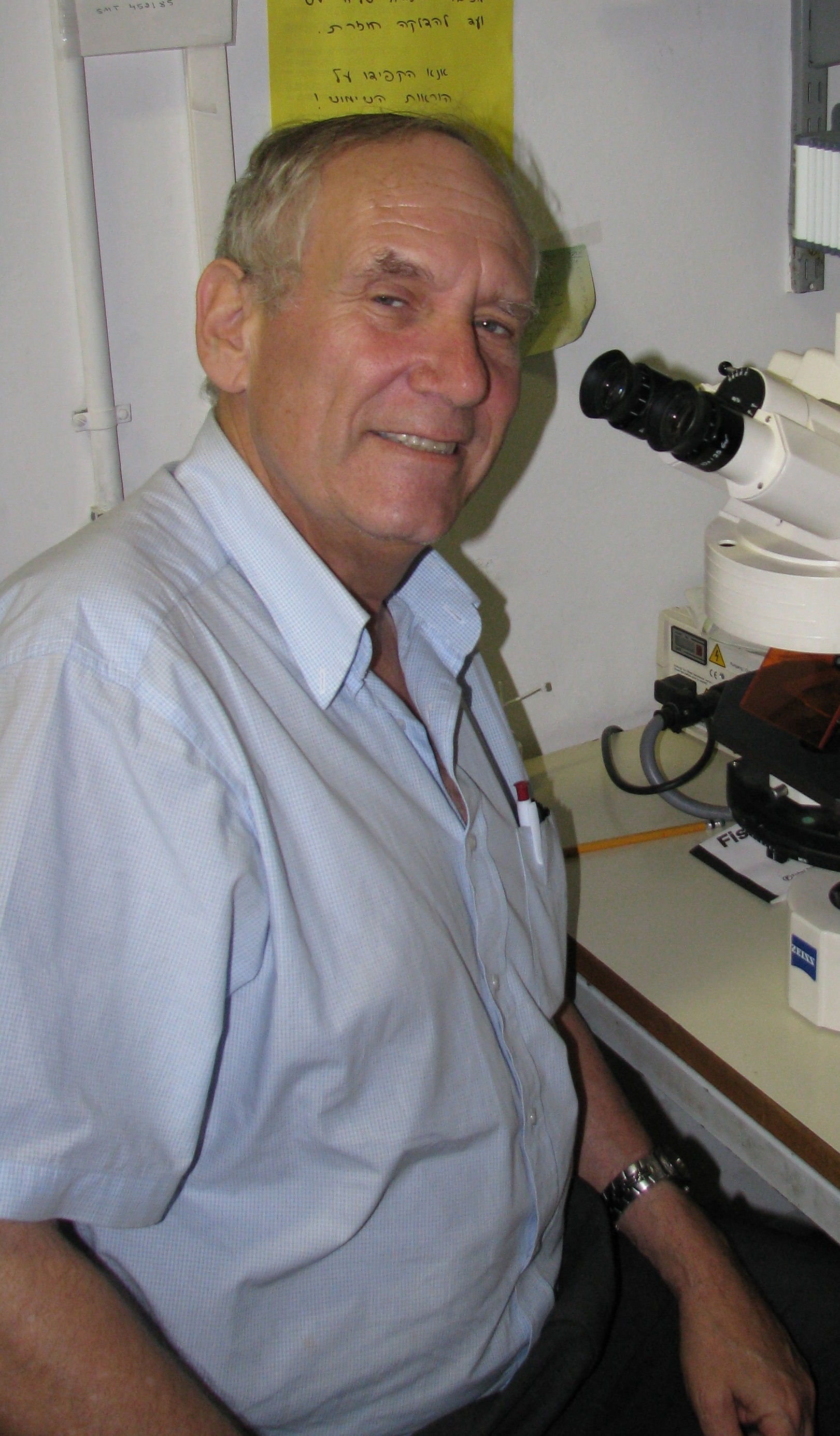
- Yosef Gruenbaum
- Born: Yosef Gruenbaum; September 22, 1949 (age 76); Jerusalem, Israel
- Education: The Hebrew University of Jerusalem
- Known for: Research on nuclear lamins
- Scientific career
- Fields: Biochemistry
- Workplaces: The Hebrew University of Jerusalem
- Doctoral advisor: Aharon Razin

Yosef Gruenbaum (Hebrew: יוסף גרינבאום; born September 22, 1949) is an Israeli researcher, academic, biochemist and professor in medicine based in Jerusalem, Israel. He is known for his research on nuclear lamins and their associated proteins in health and disease. He was the Chairman of the Alexander Silberman Institute of Life Sciences at the Hebrew University of Jerusalem and is an adjunct professor at the Northwestern University, Chicago.

== Biography ==
Gruenbaum was born in Jerusalem, Israel, in 1949, to Yehuda and Shulamit Gruenbaum who were Jewish German immigrants. He attended Hebrew University of Jerusalem and earned his bachelor's degree, in chemistry and physics, in 1973. Gruenbaum received his master's degree in material sciences in 1976 and PhD in 1982 under the supervision of Aharon Razin. He went on to do a post-doctorate at University of California, San Francisco with Prof. John Sadat and then got tenured at the Hebrew University where he has been teaching and researching since. He also traveled to Baltimore and Basel where he held yearly positions and did research with Professor Bob Goldman, Kathy Wilson and others.

He is married to Pnina Gruenbaum and has four kids.

== Academic career ==
Gruenbaum started his academic career in 1985 as a lecturer at Silberman Institute of Life Sciences of the Hebrew University of Jerusalem. In 1991, he became senior lecturer and associate professor in 1996. He is serving as the chairman and senior professor at the Hebrew University of Jerusalem since 1999. He is also serving as adjunct professor at School of Medicine, Northwestern University since 2005.

Gruenbaum received a number of honors including Fogarty-NIH Award for distinguished foreign post-doctoral fellow from UCSF in 1984. In 1985, he received Alon Fellowship for distinguished young Israeli scientists. Gruenbaum was honored with The Gruss Lipper Fellowship in 2004 and William T. Golden scholar in residence in 2005 by Marine Biological Laboratory, Woods Hole, Massachusetts. In 2005, Yosef Gruenbaum received his honorary degree from Charles University in Prague, Czech Republic.

== Selected publications ==
- Gruenbaum Y, Foisner R. Lamins: Nuclear Intermediate Filament Proteins with Fundamental Functions in Nuclear Mechanics and Genome Regulation. Annu Rev Biochem. 2015.
- Gruenbaum Y. Nuclear Organization. Annu Rev Biochem. 2015.
- Gruenbaum Y, Medalia O. Lamins: the structure and protein complexes.2015.
- Zuela N, Friedman N, Zaslaver A, Gruenbaum Y. Measuring the effects of high CO₂ levels in Caenorhabditis elegans. Methods. 2014.
- Sharabi K, Charar C, Friedman N, Mizrahi I, Zaslaver A, Sznajder JI, Gruenbaum Y. The response to high CO2 levels requires the neuropeptide secretion component HID-1 to promote pumping inhibition. PLoS Genet. 2014.
- Bar DZ, Davidovich M, Lamm AT, Zer H, Wilson KL, Gruenbaum Y. BAF-1 mobility is regulated by environmental stresses. Mol Biol Cell. 2014.
- Gruenbaum Y, Aebi U. Intermediate filaments: a dynamic network that controls cell mechanics. F1000Prime Rep. 2014.
- Lyakhovetsky R, Gruenbaum Y. Studying lamins in invertebrate models. Adv Exp Med Biol. 2014.
- Prokocimer M, Barkan R, Gruenbaum Y. Hutchinson-Gilford progeria syndrome through the lens of transcription. Aging Cell. 2013.
- Grossman E, Dahan I, Stick R, Goldberg MW, Gruenbaum Y, Medalia O. Filaments assembly of ectopically expressed Caenorhabditis elegans lamin within Xenopus oocytes. J Struct Biol. 2012.
- Bank EM, Ben-Harush K, Feinstein N, Medalia O, Gruenbaum Y. Structural and physiological phenotypes of disease-linked lamin mutations in C. elegans. J Struct Biol. 2012.
- Barkan R, Zahand AJ, Sharabi K, Lamm AT, Feinstein N, Haithcock E, Wilson KL, Liu J, Gruenbaum Y. Ce-emerin and LEM-2: essential roles in Caenorhabditis elegans development, muscle function, and mitosis. 2012.
- Zuela N, Bar DZ, Gruenbaum Y. Lamins in development, tissue maintenance and stress. EMBO Rep. 2012.
