= Joseph Yanai =

Israeli scientist and researcher

- יוסף ינאי
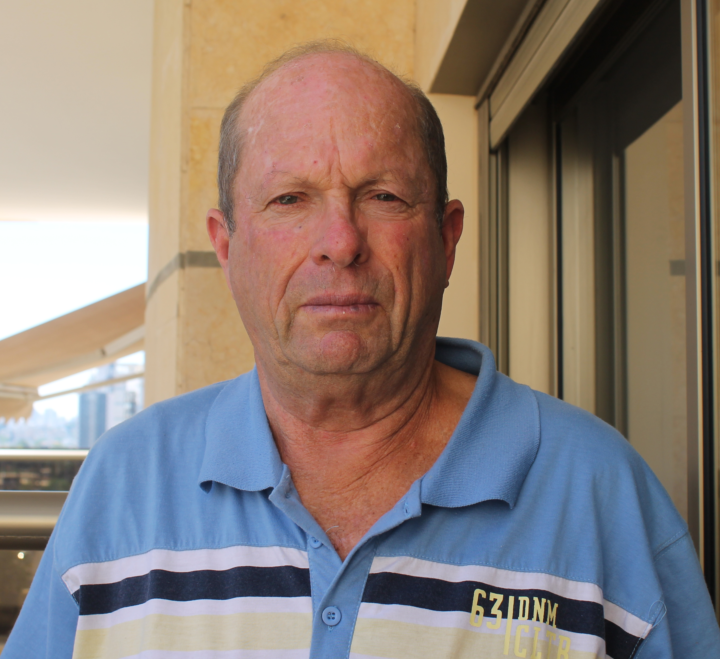
- Born: 1944 (age 81–82); Rehovot, Israel
- Education: Hebrew University of Jerusalem, University of Colorado Boulder
- Known for: Reversal of neurobehavioral birth defects in animal models
- Notable work: Studies on neurobehavioral teratology
- Title: Professor and Director of the Ross Laboratory for Studies in Neural Birth Defects
- Scientific career
- Fields: Neurobiology, Pharmacology
- Workplaces: Hebrew University of Jerusalem, Duke University School of Medicine

Joseph Yanai (Hebrew: יוסף ינאי) is a researcher pioneering in studying the reversal of neurobehavioral birth defects in animal models. He serves as a professor and Director of the Ross Laboratory for Studies in Neural Birth Defects at the Department of Medical Neurobiology, The Institute For Medical Research, Israel-Canada (IMRIC) at the Hebrew University-Hadassah Medical School Jerusalem, Israel and was also appointed as adjunct professor, Department of Pharmacology and Cancer Biology, Duke University School of Medicine, Durham, NC, US.

== Education ==
Yanai was born in Rehovot, Israel in 1944. After graduating from the Mikveh Israel Agricultural High School, he received his BSc Agr. in agriculture and genetics at the Hebrew University of Jerusalem in 1967 and both his MA in 1970 and PhD in 1971 from the University of Colorado Boulder.

== Professional career ==
- Professor, Department of Medical Neurobiology, Hebrew University, Hadassah Medical School, Jerusalem, since 1978.
- Adjunct professor, Department of Pharmacology and Cancer Biology, Duke University School of Medicine, Durham, North Carolina, 1991-2020.
- Director, Ross Laboratory for Studies in Neural Birth Defects, Department of Neurobiology, Hebrew University Hadassah Medical School, Jerusalem, since 1987.

== Research work ==
Since 1973, he has been among the forerunners in the study of behavioral birth defects. His novel approach was to study the mechanism by which certain neuroteratogens induce their deleterious effect, focusing on behavioral defects that are mechanistically related to septohippocampal cholinergic innervation. The results showed alterations in cholinergic neurotransmission cascade converging into the abolishment of the cholinergic receptor-induced activation/translocation PKC activity. By ascertaining the mechanisms of the neuroteratogenicity, he pointed in his book “neurobehavioral teratology.” to the future of the field by establishing the concept of "Neurobehavioral teratology. Furthermore, Yanai argued that understanding the mechanism of the developmental defect will eventually enable its reversal, a concept that seemed like science fiction in 1984.

Specifically since 1987, Yanai has developed animal models for the reversal of neurobehavioral birth defects, starting with manipulation of A10 septal dopaminergic innervation, nicotine therapy, but most significantly, by transplantation of cells to the impaired brain. These included fetal differentiated brain cells (neural grafting), and in subsequent studies, stem cells of various origins: embryonic, neural stem cells, subventricular stem cells, and mesenchymal stem cells. Transplantation of cells of all types reversed the prenatally-induced behavioral deficits and the mechanistically related neural alterations. Further studies suggested that one major mechanism by which the stem cells exert their therapeutic action is by enhancing neurogenesis. More recently, Yanai expanded his research on early development to include parental preconception exposure.

These findings were published in the leading journal (for example Molecular Psychiatry,) and received a widespread media attention (external links) and presented in an invited major address, at the international conferences in San Antonio, Texas, in June 2016. Review of Yanai’s work and the progress in reversal of neurobehavioral teratology that was advanced by other laboratories was published in 2019 and in Basel, Switzerland, in February 2017.
