= Howard Cedar =

Israeli American biochemist (born 1943)

- הווארד צידר
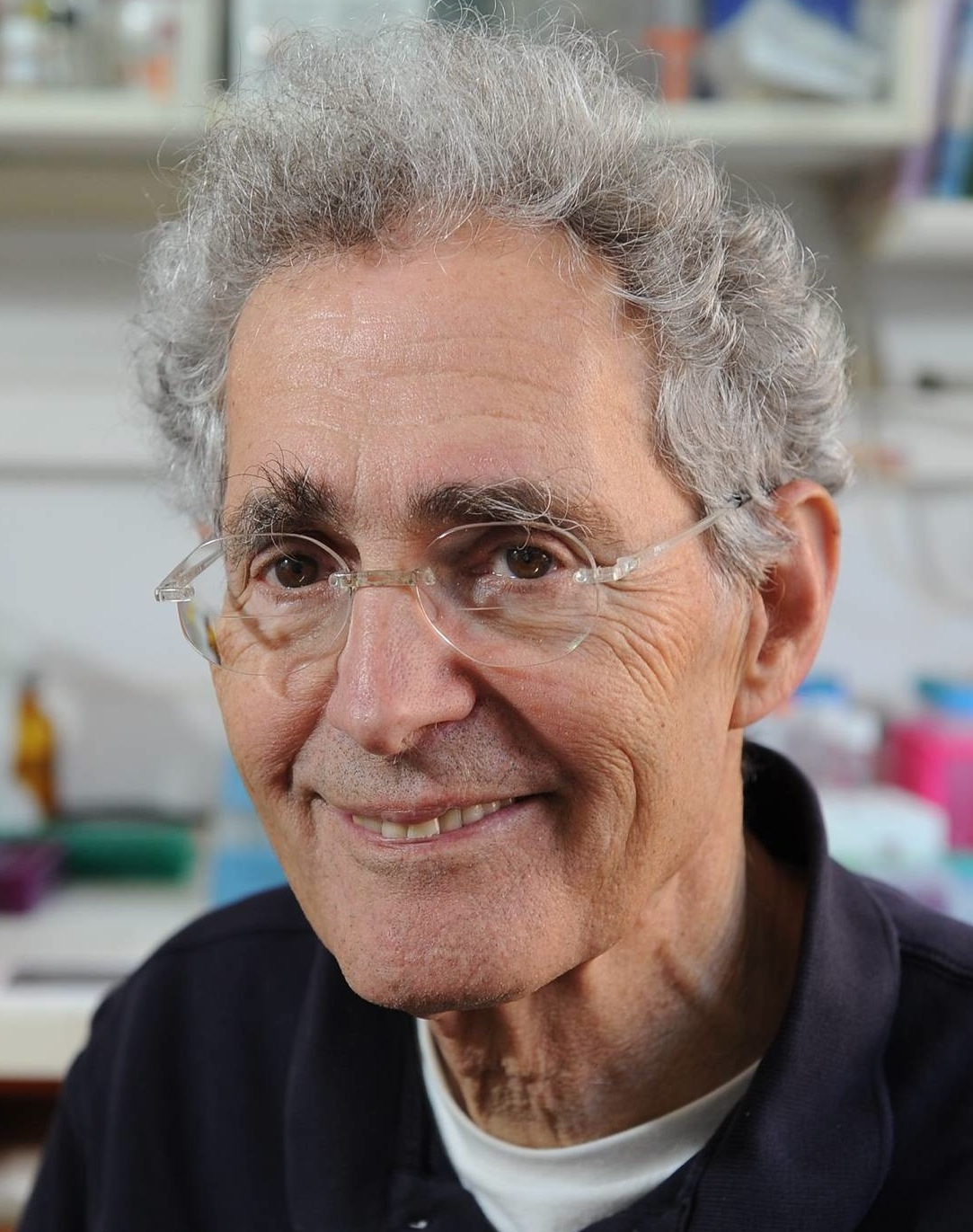
- Howard Cedar in 2016
- Born: Howard Chaim Cedar; January 12, 1943 (age 83); New York City, U.S.
- Education: New York University; Massachusetts Institute of Technology
- Spouse: Zipora
- Children: 6 (including Joseph)
- Awards: Louisa Gross Horwitz Prize (2016); Gairdner Prize (2011); EMET Prize (2009); Wolf Prize in Medicine (2008); Israel Prize (1999)
- Scientific career
- Fields: Molecular Biology
- Workplaces: Hebrew University of Jerusalem
- Doctoral students: Eva Jablonka

Howard Chaim Cedar (Hebrew: הווארד חיים צידר; born January 12, 1943) is an Israeli American biochemist who works on DNA methylation, a mechanism that turns genes on and off.

== Early life and education ==
Howard Chaim Cedar was born in the United States. He received a bachelor's degree from Massachusetts Institute of Technology (MIT) and, in 1970, received an M.D. and a PhD from New York University.

== Medical research career ==
From 1971 to 1973 he was in the U.S. Public Health Service at the National Institutes of Health in Bethesda, Maryland.

In 1973 he joined the medical school of the Hebrew University in Jerusalem, and now serves as professor emeritus in the Department for Developmental Biology & Cancer Research, The Institute For Medical Research, Israel-Canada (IMRIC).

== Personal life ==
He is married to Zipora, a psychodramatist, and has six children, Joseph (a film writer and director), Dahlia, Noa, Yoav, Yonatan and Daniel, and 24 grandchildren.

== Awards and recognition ==
- In 1999, Cedar was awarded the Israel Prize, for biology.
- In 2003, he became a member of the Israel Academy of Sciences and Humanities.
- In 2008, he was awarded the Wolf Prize in Medicine, jointly with Aharon Razin, "for their fundamental contributions to our understanding of the role of DNA methylation in the control of gene expression."
- In 2009, he was awarded the EMET Prize for his work in cancer research.
- In 2011 he received the Canada Gairdner International Award, together with Aharon Razin for their "pioneering discoveries on DNA methylation and its role in gene expression."
- In 2011 he received the Rothschild Prize in Biology
- In 2016 he received the Louisa Gross Horwitz Prize(Columbia University) together with Aharon Razin and Gary Felsenfeld.

== See also ==
- List of Israel Prize recipients
