= Bertil Hille =

American medical researcher (born 1940)

- Born: October 10, 1940 (age 86); New Haven, Connecticut.
- Education: Yale University, The Rockefeller University
- Spouse: Merrill Burr Hille
- Awards: Louisa Gross Horwitz Prize, Albert Lasker Award, Gairdner Foundation International Award
- Scientific career
- Fields: Ion channels
- Workplaces: University of Washington

Bertil Hille (born October 10, 1940) is an Emeritus Professor, and the Wayne E. Crill Endowed Professor in the Department of Physiology and Biophysics at the University of Washington. He is known for his research on cell signalling by ion channels. His book Ion Channels of Excitable Membranes has been the standard work on the subject, appearing in multiple editions since its first publication in 1984.

== Biography ==
=== Early life and education ===
Hille was born in New Haven, Connecticut. His father is Carl Einar Hille, a Yale math professor and a member of the U.S. National Academy of Sciences and the Royal Swedish Academy of Sciences. He attended the Foote School and Westminster School (Connecticut).

Hille received his B.S. summa cum laude in Zoology from Yale University (1962) and his Ph.D. in Life Sciences from The Rockefeller University (1967). During his PhD, Hille started his long-term collaboration with Clay Armstrong, who he shared many awards with several decades later. After completing his Ph.D, Hille did postdoc research with Sir Alan L. Hodgkin (1963 Nobel laureate for the basis of nerve action potentials) and Richard Keynes at the University of Cambridge, England.

== Career ==
In 1968 Hille joined the Department of Physiology and Biophysics at the University of Washington's School of Medicine. In 2005, he was named the Wayne E. Crill Endowed Professor. On July 1, 2021, he became a professor emeritus.

=== Personal life ===
Bertil Hille is married to Merrill Burr Hille, Professor Emerita of Biology at the University of Washington, and has two sons.

== Scientific contributions ==
Bertil Hille pioneered the concept of ion channels as membrane proteins forming gated aqueous pores (with Clay Armstrong). He showed that Na+ and K+ channels of axons could be distinguished by drugs such as tetrodotoxin and tetraethylammonium ion, and that their ionic selectivity can be understood by limiting pore size, the selectivity filter, and by movements of ions through a series of saturable sites. He showed that local anesthetics enter Na+ channels in a state-dependent manner.

In 1984, Hille started a new direction of studying the modulation of ion channels by G protein–coupled receptors. He distinguished two new signaling pathways for excitable cells. A fast, pertussis toxin-sensitive pathway turned on inward rectifier K+ channels and turned off Ca2+ channels by G protein Gβγ subunits. A slow, pertussis toxin-insensitive pathway turned off some K+ and Ca2+ channels by depleting the plasma membrane phosphoinositides, phosphatidylinositol 4,5-bisphosphate (PIP2). New tools and findings from the Hille lab, together with the initial finding (1996) from Donald W. Hilgemann's lab at UT southwestern, demonstrated that PIP2 is an essential cofactor for many ion channels and transporters. The low-abundance signaling lipid PIP2 indeed plays a significant role in regulating neuronal and cardiac excitability. Hille has developed a detailed model of the PIP2 loss mechanism and its effects on the muscarinic inhibition of M-channels.

Hille has published more than 200 papers and book chapters. He is the author of multiple editions of Ion Channels of Excitable Membranes, described as an essential introduction not just for beginners but for readers throughout the areas of biochemistry and biophysics. Hille's book is considered to mark a turning point in the field, defining the modern era of ion channel studies. The book is known for its clarity of language, its ability to communicate to both the beginner and the specialist, its attention to research history, and the breadth and depth of its scientific coverage.

== Awards and distinctions ==
- 1986 - Elected to the National Academy of Sciences
- 1990 - Bristol-Myers Squibb Award
- 1996 - Louisa Gross Horwitz Prize at Columbia University (with Clay Armstrong)
- 1998 - Fellow of the American Academy of Arts and Sciences
- 1999 - Albert Lasker Award for Basic Medical Research (with Rod MacKinnon and Clay Armstrong)
- 2001 Gairdner Foundation International Award (with Armstrong and MacKinnon), "For the elucidation of the mechanism of action and molecular structure of cation channels".
- 2002 - Elected to the Institute of Medicine (now the National Academy of Medicine)
- 2008 - Doctorate of Science honoris causa, The Rockefeller University
- 2009 - Bard Lecture, Johns Hopkins University
- 2018 - Distinguished Science in Medicine Lecture, University of Washington School of Medicine
