= Oxygenase =

Enzyme

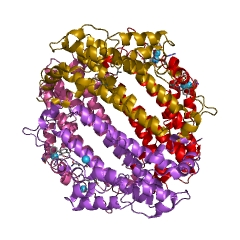
Molecular structure of tryptophan 2,3-dioxygenase

An oxygenase is any enzyme that oxidizes a substrate by transferring the oxygen from molecular oxygen O_{2} (as in air) to it. The oxygenases form a class of oxidoreductases; their EC number is EC 1.13 or EC 1.14.

== Structure ==
Most oxygenases contain either a metal, usually iron, or an organic cofactor, usually flavin. These cofactors interact with O_{2}, leading to its transfer to substrate.

Oxygenases constitute a major intracellular source of iron and carbon monoxide

== Mechanism ==
Two types of oxygenases are recognized:

- Monooxygenases, or mixed function oxidase, transfer one oxygen atom to the substrate, and reduce the other oxygen atom to water.
- Dioxygenases, or oxygen transferases, incorporate both atoms of molecular oxygen (O_{2}) into the product(s) of the reaction.

Among the most common monooxygenases are the cytochrome P450 oxidases, responsible for breaking down numerous chemicals in the body.

== History ==
Oxygenases were discovered in 1955 simultaneously by two groups, Osamu Hayaishi from Japan and Howard S. Mason from the US. Hayaishi was awarded the 1986 Wolf Prize in Medicine "for the discovery of the oxygenase enzymes and elucidation of their structure and biological importance."
