= Aharon Razin =

Israeli biochemist (1935–2019)

- אהרון רזין
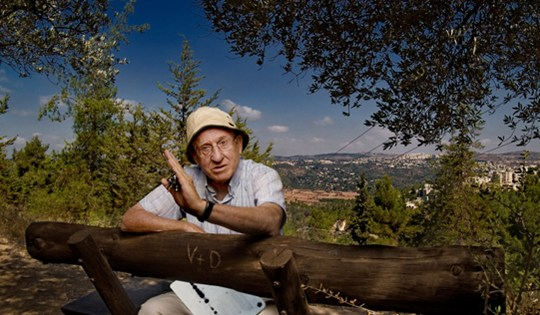
- Razin in 2009
- Born: April 6, 1935; Tel Aviv, British Palestine
- Died: May 27, 2019 (aged 85)
- Education: Hebrew University of Jerusalem
- Awards: Louisa Gross Horwitz Prize (2016); Gairdner Foundation International Award (2011); Wolf Prize in Medicine (2008); Israel Prize (2004)
- Scientific career
- Fields: Biochemistry, molecular biology
- Workplaces: Hebrew University of Jerusalem

Aharon Razin (Hebrew: אהרון רזין; April 6, 1935 – May 27, 2019) was an Israeli biochemist.

== Biography ==
Aharon Razin was raised in Petah Tikva. He began his academic studies at the Hebrew University of Jerusalem, majoring in physics and mathematics. He completed his M.A. and PhD in biochemistry, and did post-doctoral work at the California Institute of Technology. When he returned to Israel in 1971, he served as senior lecturer, associate professor and full professor of cellular biochemistry and human genetics at the Hebrew University Faculty of Medicine.

In 1980, Razin was appointed head of the Department of Cellular Biochemistry at the Faculty of Medicine and Head of the Institute of Biochemistry. From 1988, he has held the Dr. Jacob Greenbaum Chair of Medical Sciences at Hebrew University. He is a member of the board of the Authority for Research and Development at the Hebrew University, chairman of the Planning and Development Committee of the Faculty of Medicine and member of the Israel National Academy of Sciences advisory committee on the Human Genome. He served as professor emeritus in the Department for Developmental Biology & Cancer Research, The Institute For Medical Research, Israel-Canada (IMRIC).

== Research career ==
In his early studies, Razin examined the metabolism of nucleic acids and the biochemical faults in patients with gout and favism. He later studied the specific mutation with the aid of a chemically synthesized DNA-sequence, DNA methylation in gene activity and methylation pattern production of single genes in the development of the fetus.

== Awards ==
In 2004, Razin was awarded the Israel Prize for biochemistry.

In 2008, he was awarded the Wolf Prize in Medicine, jointly with Howard Cedar, for "their fundamental contributions to our understanding of the role of DNA methylation in the control of gene expression." Razin's work on chemical changes in the DNA molecule focuses on the molecular process that turns on and off some 40,000 genes in the human body.

In 2009, Razin won The EMET Prize for Art, Science and Culture.

In 2011 he received the Canada Gairdner Award from the Gairdner Foundation, together with Howard Cedar and Adrian Peter Bird, for their "pioneering discoveries on DNA methylation and its role in gene expression."

In 2016 he received the Louisa Gross Horwitz Prize (Columbia University) together with Howard Cedar and Gary Felsenfeld.

== See also ==
- List of Israel Prize recipients
- Science and technology in Israel
