= Don Craig Wiley =

American biologist (1944–2001)

- Born: October 21, 1944; Akron, Ohio, U.S.
- Died: c. November 15, 2001 (aged 57); Memphis, Tennessee, U.S.
- Education: Tufts University; Harvard University
- Spouse: Katrin Valgeirsdottir
- Awards: William B. Coley Award; Louisa Gross Horwitz Prize; Japan Prize
- Scientific career
- Thesis: The 5.5 ⁰A structure of the regulatory enzyme, aspartate transcarbamylase (1972)
- Doctoral advisor: William N. Lipscomb, Jr.
- Doctoral students: Michael Eisen; Pamela J. Bjorkman; Jue Chen

Don Craig Wiley (October 21, 1944 – c. November 15, 2001) was an American structural biologist.

== Education ==
Wiley received his doctoral degree in biophysics in 1971 from Harvard University, where he worked under the direction of the subsequent 1976 chemistry Nobel Prize winner William N. Lipscomb, Jr. There, Wiley did early work on the structure of aspartate carbamoyltransferase, the largest molecular structure determined at that time. Noteworthy in this effort was that Wiley managed to grow crystals of aspartate carbamoyltransferase suitable for obtaining its X-ray structure, a particularly difficult task in the case of this molecular complex.

== Career and research ==
Wiley was world-renowned for finding new ways to help the human immune system battle virus including smallpox, influenza, HIV/AIDS and herpes simplex.

Famous quote: "I'm sorry, but I just don't understand anything in biology unless I know what it looks like."

== Awards and honors ==
In 1990, he was awarded the Louisa Gross Horwitz Prize from Columbia University. His research was honored with the 1993 Cancer Research Institute William B. Coley Award. Harvard called Wiley "one of the most influential biologists of his generation." In 1999, Wiley and another Harvard professor, Jack L. Strominger, won the Japan Prize for their discoveries of how the immune system protects humans from infections.

== Personal life ==
Wiley owned a British racing green-colored Aston Martin.

He was a member of the American Academy of Arts and Sciences, the National Academy of Sciences, and the American Philosophical Society.

== Disappearance and death ==
Wiley disappeared on November 15, 2001. The official coroner's report stated that Wiley died after falling off a bridge near Memphis, Tennessee; his body was found in the Mississippi River 300 miles (480 km) downstream in Vidalia, Louisiana a month later and his death was ruled to be an accident. Shelby County Medical Examiner, Dr. O. C. Smith, conducted the investigation into Wiley's death. Smith was quoted by a Boston Magazine article by Doug Most, which states: "Of all the measurements Smith took, one stood out: 8 inches. That's how narrow the curb is from the road to the railing, which is only 43 inches high. 'If he stood against the rail, it's hitting him in the back of the thigh,' Smith says. 'If he's startled or caught by a gust from an 18-wheeler, his center of gravity is 47 inches, near the top rail, below his hip.'"

Wiley was 6'3" and weighed 160 pounds, according to the Los Angeles Times.

== See also ==
- List of solved missing person cases (2000s)
