= S. Lawrence Zipursky =

American neuroscientist (born 1955)

- Born: January 9, 1955 (age 71)
- Education: Albert Einstein College of Medicine
- Awards: Louisa Gross Horwitz Prize(2015); W. Alden Spencer Award (2010)
- Scientific career
- Fields: Neuroscience
- Workplaces: University of California, Los Angeles

S. Lawrence Zipursky (born 1955) is an American neuroscientist, currently Distinguished Professor of Biological Chemistry at University of California, Los Angeles and an Investigator of the Howard Hughes Medical Institute. Zipursky studies brain development. His research focuses on how neural circuits are formed during development. His laboratory has provided insights into various aspects of circuit assembly, including the molecular basis of neuronal identity through their work on the Dscam1 locus in Drosophila. Zipursky was elected Fellow of the American Academy of Arts and Sciences in 1998 and a member of the National Academy of Sciences in 2009. He received the Louisa Gross Horwitz Prize for Biology and Biochemistry from Columbia University in 2015. Zipursky was a graduate student with Jerard Hurwitz at Albert Einstein College of Medicine and a postdoctoral fellow with Seymour Benzer at the California Institute of Technology .

== Personal life ==
He married Susan Troy, a lawyer, in 1978. His father, Alvin Zipursky (1930-2021), was a pediatrician in Toronto.
