= Osamu Hayaishi =

Japanese biochemist

- 早石 修
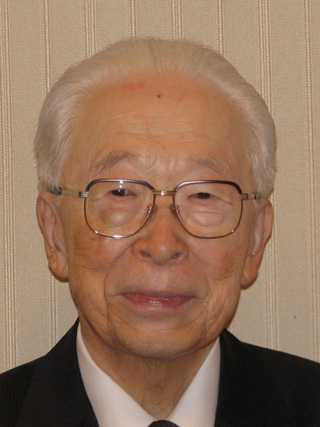
- Born: January 8, 1920; Stockton, California, USA
- Died: December 17, 2015 (aged 95); Kyoto, Japan
- Education: Osaka University
- Known for: Oxygenases; Prostaglandin
- Awards: Japan Academy Prize (1967); Order of Culture (1972); Wolf Prize (1986)
- Scientific career
- Fields: Biochemistry; Physiology
- Workplaces: Osaka Bioscience Institute; Osaka Medical College; Kyoto University; Vanderbilt University; University of Tokyo; Osaka University; Washington University in St. Louis; National Institutes of Health
- Doctoral students: Yasutomi Nishizuka; Tasuku Honjo; Shigetada Nakanishi

Osamu Hayaishi MJA (早石 修, Hayaishi Osamu; January 8, 1920 – December 17, 2015), was a Japanese biochemist, physiologist, and military physician. He discovered Oxygenases at the National Institute of Arthritis and Metabolic Diseases, National Institutes of Health in 1955.

Citing his "outstanding and pioneering contributions to biomedical sciences and enzymology," the Wolf Foundation awarded Hayaishi the 1986 Wolf Prize in Medicine "for his discovery of the oxygenase enzymes and elucidation of their structure and biological importance".

Hayaishi was President of International Union of Biochemistry and Molecular Biology from 1973 to 1976.

== Biography ==
Hayaishi was born in Stockton, California, United States, in 1920. He completed his medical degree in 1942 from Osaka University. After serving as a medical officer in the Japanese Navy for three years, he joined the Institute of Microbial Diseases, Osaka University and was awarded his Ph.D. in 1949.

After working with Arthur Kornberg at the National Institute of Arthritis and Metabolic Diseases, National Institutes of Health and Washington University in St. Louis, Hayaishi served as a research group leader or a professor at various research institutions in the US and Japan including Kyoto University, and led approximately 600 graduate students in his life including Yasutomi Nishizuka; Tasuku Honjo, the 2018 Nobel laureate in medicine or physiology; and Shigetada Nakanishi. More than 100 of his pupils became professors at various universities in Japan.

== Research ==
Hayaishi, along with group members, is recognized for his great contributions to biomedical sciences and enzymology, especially the discovery of Oxygenases group of enzymes. These enzymes are widely distributed in nature and represent a unique group of respiratory enzymes that catalyze the direct incorporation of molecular oxygen into various substrates.

Hayaishi is also known for his discovery of the sleep-inducing action of Prostaglandin D2.

== Recognition ==
Hayaishi was awarded several honors, including the Asahi Prize (1964), the Japan Academy Prize (1967), the Order of Culture (1972), the Louis and Bert Freedman Foundation Award from the New York Academy of Sciences (1976), the Wolf Prize in Medicine (1986), and the Distinguished Scientist Award of the World Federation of Sleep Research Societies (1999).

He was also elected as a foreign member of several academies, as well as a member of the Japan Academy (MJA) in 1974.

In 1984, he was made an honorary citizen of Kyoto.
