= David Lichtstein =

Professor David Lichtstein
- דוד ליכטשטיין
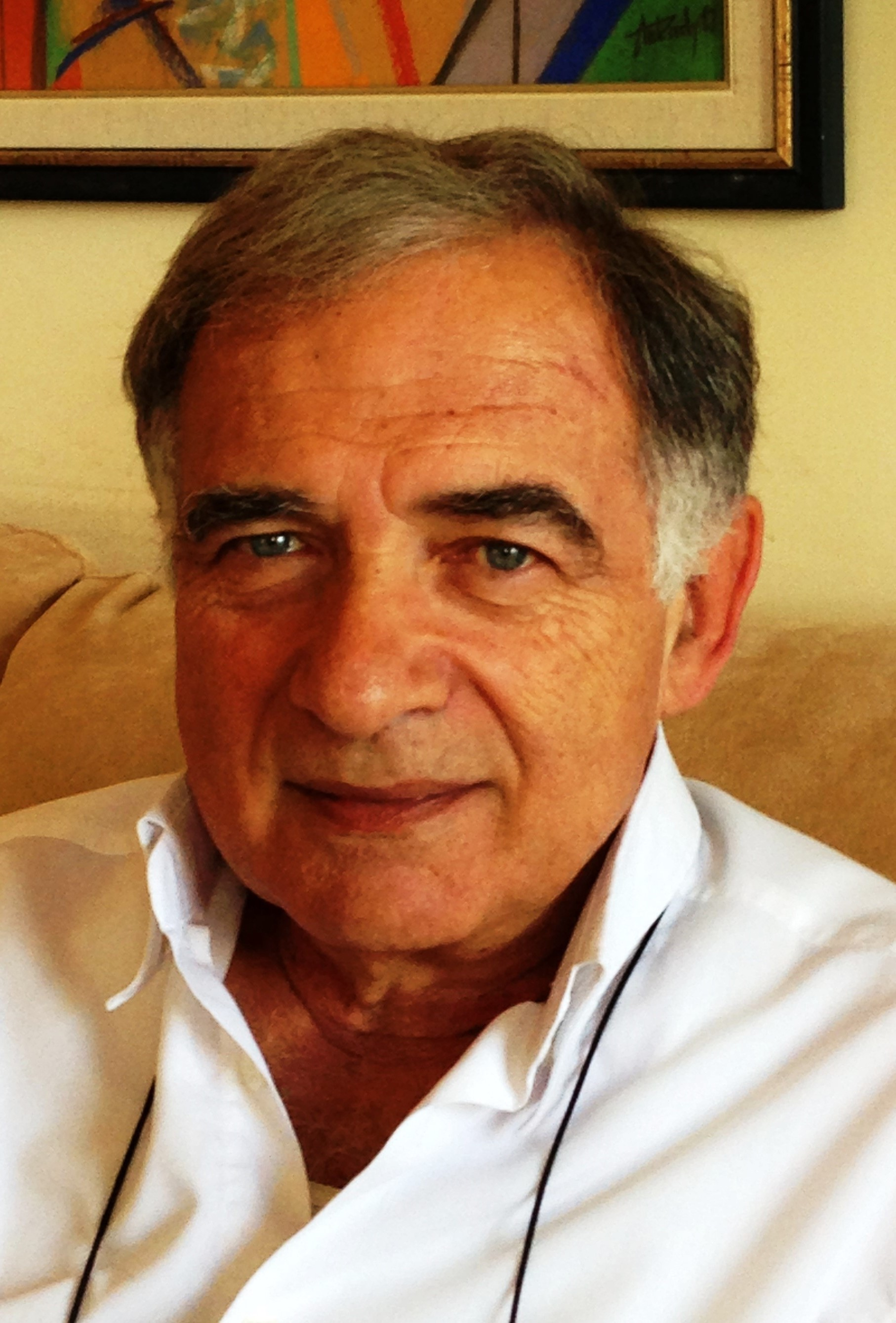

Professor of Physiology at the Faculty of Medicine at the Hebrew University of Jerusalem

Personal details
- Born: 1949 (age 76–77) Łódź, Poland

David Lichtstein (Hebrew: דוד ליכטשטיין) is a full professor of physiology at the Faculty of Medicine at the Hebrew University of Jerusalem and the incumbent of the Walter & Greta Stiel Chair in Heart Studies. He is the former chairman of the Institute For Medical Research, Israel-Canada (IMRIC) (2008–2012) and Dean of the Faculty of Medicine at the Hebrew University of Jerusalem (2013–2017).

== Life and career ==
Lichtstein was born in Łódź, Poland in 1949. He immigrated to Israel with his family in 1957. He was awarded a B.Sc. in Physiology and Zoology in 1970, followed by an M.Sc. in physiology in 1972 and a Ph.D. in physiology in 1977 all from the Hebrew University of Jerusalem. Lichtstein chose medical sciences as a career because of the opportunity to combine science and contribute to human welfare. His Ph.D. research, under the supervision of Prof. J. Dobkin and Prof. J. Magnes, concentrated on metabolic changes in the brain under normal and pathological conditions. He did his postdoctoral research (1977–1980) on opioid peptides at the Roche Institute of Molecular Biology, Nutley, New Jersey.

In 1980, when he returned to Israel, Lichtstein joined the Department of Physiology of the Hebrew University-Hadassah Medical School as a lecturer; he was promoted to associate professor in 1988 and to full professor in 1994. He was a visiting scientist at the National Institute of Child Health and Human Development (1985–1986) and the Eye Institute (1997–1998) at the National Institutes of Health in Maryland, and a visiting professor at the Toledo School of Medicine in Ohio (2007).

Lichtstein served as the president of the Israel Society for Physiology and Pharmacology from 1996 to 1999. In addition, Lichtstein has held many roles at The Hebrew University and its Faculty of Medicine, including chairman of the Neurobiology Teaching Division (1983–1986), chairman of the Department of Physiology (1992–1996), chairman of the Institute for Medical Sciences (1999–2002), chairman of the Institute For Medical Research, Israel-Canada (2008–2012) and dean of the Faculty of Medicine at the Hebrew University (2013–2017). The period of his deanship was characterized by the recruitment of many new faculty members, as well as the establishment of new teaching programs and research centers. In the final year of his deanship (2017) he also served as the head of the Forum of Medical Faculty Deans in Israel.

Lichtstein is married to Esther and they have three children, Ehud, Tamar and Gidon.

== Research ==
Lichtstein's research focuses on understanding the regulation of ion transport across the plasma membrane of eukaryotic cells. Specifically, Lichtstein examines the main transport system for sodium and potassium, the sodium-potassium-ATPase, and its regulation by steroids. His work led to the discovery of specific steroids, termed cardiac steroids, which are released from the adrenal gland, and have crucial roles in the regulation of cell viability, heart contractility, blood pressure and brain function. In recent years Lichtstein and his research group have shown that these steroids have a major role in establishing human behavior and that changes in their activity in the brain are associated with depressive disorders. Lichtstein's work raised the possibility that the sodium-potassium-ATPase and the endogenous cardiac steroids that regulate its activity may serve as a target for drug development for the treatment of bipolar disorders and other psychiatric diseases.

Lichtstein has published more than 150 scientific papers in scholarly journals and books. In addition, Lichtstein serves as an acting reviewer for many journals. More than 30 graduate students from his laboratory are engaged today in research and teaching in various institutions in Israel and abroad.
