= Pamela Bjorkman =

American biochemist

Pamela J. Björkman
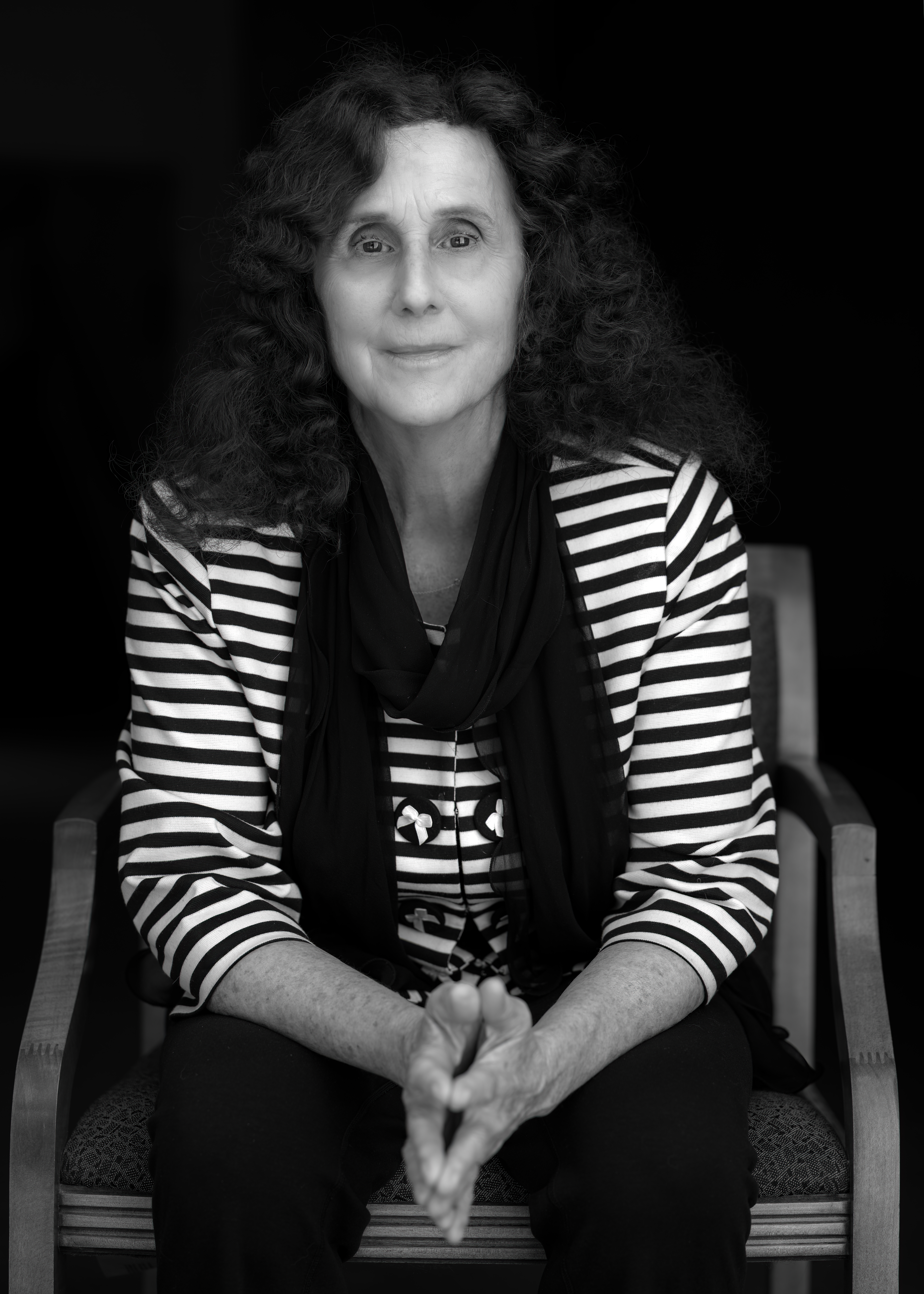
- Born: Pamela Jane Bjorkman; Portland, Oregon
- Education: University of Oregon (B.A., 1978); Harvard University (Ph.D, 1984)
- Spouse: Kai Zinn
- Children: 2
- Scientific career
- Fields: Biochemistry; Biological Engineering; Microbiology; Immunology
- Workplaces: California Institute of Technology; UCLA; Howard Hughes Medical Institute
- Academic advisors: Don Wiley

Pamela Jane Bjorkman NAS, AAAS (also spelled Pamela J. Björkman, Portland, Oregon) is an American biochemist and molecular biologist. She is the David Baltimore Professor of Biology and Biological Engineering at the California Institute of Technology (Caltech). Her research centers on the study of the three-dimensional structures of proteins related to class I MHC, or major histocompatibility complex, proteins of the immune system, and proteins involved in the immune responses to viruses. Bjorkman's goal is to improve current therapeutic applications. Bjorkman is most well known as a pioneer in the field of structural biology.

== Early life and education ==
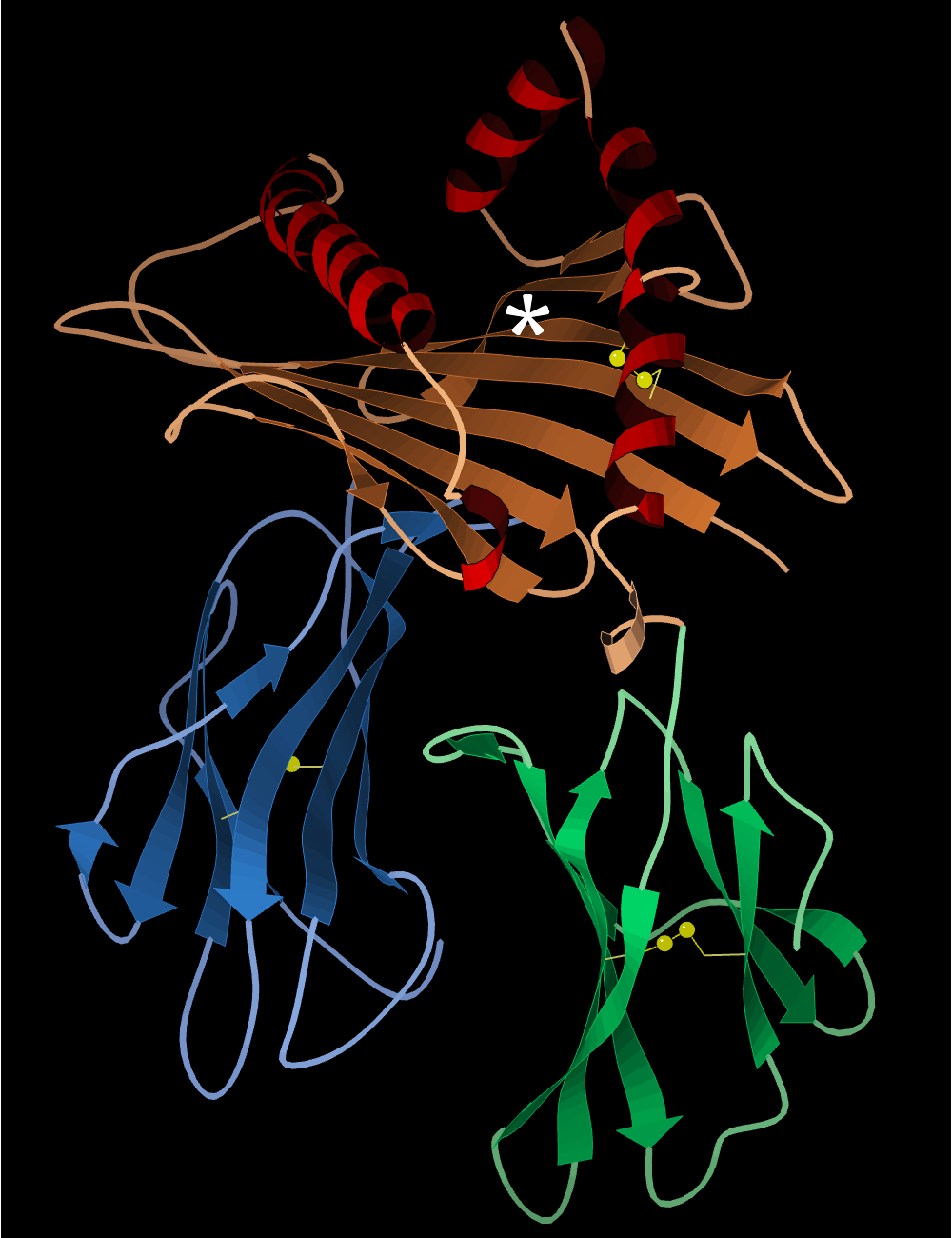
HLA-A2 molecule; peptide antigen groove (starred) on top domain

Bjorkman grew up in Parkrose, a neighborhood in Portland, Oregon. She became interested in science in high school and attended Willamette University for one year before transferring to the University of Oregon, where she earned a Bachelor of Arts degree in chemistry. As an undergraduate student, Bjorkman completed lab work with Larry Church at Reed College and O. Hayes Griffith at the University of Oregon.

In 1978, she began her PhD in biochemistry at Harvard University, where she joined the lab of Don Craig Wiley, an American structural biologist whose lab utilized x-ray crystallography. Bjorkman received her PhD from Harvard in 1984. She stayed on in Wiley's lab in a postdoctoral position where she ultimately solved the first crystal structure of an MHC protein—the HLA-A2 human histocompatibility antigen. This work was published in 1987, first at 3.5Å resolution (PDB entry 1HLA) and then refined at 2.6Å (PDB entry 3HLA).

== Career and Research ==
Bjorkman continued her postdoctoral research at Stanford University in Mark Davis’ laboratory, studying the T-cell receptors that recognize antigens presented in the binding groove of MHC proteins. They developed a model explaining how this recognition mechanism works. While at Stanford, Bjorkman married neurobiologist Kai Zinn, also currently a full professor at Caltech. Bjorkman and Zinn have two children.

In 1989, Bjorkman joined the Biology faculty at the California Institute of Technology as an assistant professor. She earned tenure as an associate professor in 1995 and was promoted to full professor in 1998. She was an HHMI investigator from 1989 to 2015. She became the David Baltimore Professor of Biology and Biological Engineering in 2018 and Merkin Institute professor in 2021.

The Bjorkman Laboratory at Caltech focuses on investigating immune responses to viral pathogens with the ultimate goal of improving therapeutics and contributing to vaccine development. Her research focuses particularly on HIV-1, influenza, hepatitis C, and, since the COVID-19 pandemic, SARS-CoV-2. During the pandemic, Bjorkman worked with Michel Nussenzweig, a frequent collaborator, to study coronavirus spike protein structures. This research has implications for vaccine development as new SARS-CoV-2 variants arise.

The Bjorkman Lab utilizes x-ray crystallography, electron microscopy, electron tomography, cryo-electron microscopy, and fluorescent microscopy to study pathogen envelope glycoproteins and the molecular structures involved in the cell surface recognition of viral pathogens. Bjorkman's research also focuses on engineering antibody reagents and the development of mosaic nanoparticles for use in broadly effective vaccines.

Bjorkman's research has been published in journals like Nature and Science.

== Awards ==
- 1989 Pew Scholar in the Biomedical Sciences by the Pew Charitable Trusts
- 1993 Cancer Research Institute William B. Coley Award
- 1994 Gairdner Foundation International Award (jointly with Don Wiley)
- 1994 James R. Klinenberg Science Award from the Arthritis Foundation
- 1996 AAI-PharMingen Investigator Award
- 1996 Paul Ehrlich and Ludwig Darmstaedter Prize
- 1997 Fellow of the American Academy of Arts and Sciences
- 1997 James R. Klinenberg Science Award from the Arthritis Foundation
- 2001 Member of the National Academy of Sciences
- 2002 Max Planck Research Award
- 2002 Member of the American Philosophical Society
- 2004 Rose Payne Distinguished Scientist Award
- 2006 L'Oreal-UNESCO Women in Science
- 2010 National Institute of Health Director's Pioneer Award
- 2021 Greengard Prize
- 2025 Wolf Prize in Medicine
