= Clara Franzini-Armstrong =

American electron microscopist (born 1938)

- Born: 3 October 1938 (age 87); Florence, Italy
- Education: University of Pisa
- Known for: Electron microscopy studies of skeletal and cardiac muscles
- Spouse: Clay Armstrong
- Scientific career
- Fields: Cell and Developmental Biology
- Workplaces: University of Pennsylvania
- Website: https://cdb.med.upenn.edu/people/clara-armstrong/

Clara Franzini-Armstrong (born on 3 October 1938) is an electron microscopist and professor emerita of cell and developmental biology at the University of Pennsylvania.

== Early life ==
Franzini-Armstrong was born in Florence on 3 October 1938. She lived with both of her parents along with her brothers Paolo, Carlo, and Marco. Her father was an atomic physicist, and her mother had a physics degree. She became interested in science during her schooling.

== Education ==
Franzini-Armstrong enrolled in the biological sciences program at the University of Pisa in 1956 and earned her Laurea degree in 1960. She became interested in electron microscopy after the Italian Ministry of Education gave an electron microscope to the University of Pisa. Franzini-Armstrong completed postdoctoral training at Keith R. Porter's laboratory at Harvard University.

== Career ==
From 1960 to 1961, Franzini-Armstrong was an assistant professor of pathology at the University of Pisa. Then, from 1963 to 1964, she worked at the National Institutes of Health with R. J. Podolsky and earned a Master of Research degree in muscle physiology. Later, from 1964 to 1966, she worked as a research assistant at University College London, with Andrew Huxley, where she studied contractile machinery and optical methods in Huxley’s laboratory. During this period, she also earned a second Master of Research degree in muscle structure. She worked as a research associate in physiology at Duke University in the late 1960s.

From 1969 to the early 1970s, Franzini-Armstrong worked as an associate in physiology at the University of Rochester. She then became an assistant professor in physiology at the University of Rochester from 1972 to 1975, before becoming an associate professor of anatomy at the University of Pennsylvania from 1975 to 1981.

Franzini-Armstrong has been a professor emerita of cell and developmental biology at the Perelman School of Medicine at the University of Pennsylvania since 2007. She and her husband are the only married couple to be members of the National Academy of Sciences.

=== Research ===
Franzini-Armstrong discovered that T-tubules open at the cell surface, which helped explain how muscles contract.

Franzini-Armstrong's research focuses on the organization of membranes and macromolecular complexes responsible for excitation-contraction coupling in cardiac and skeletal muscles. Her structural work has been divided into four main phases:

1. The first phase focused on calcium cycling, particularly on defining the distribution and nature of the two membrane systems involved in this specific type of cycling.
2. The second phase involved identifying the location of the channels that release calcium during muscle activation. She also demonstrated that in muscles with high activity rates, a limiting factor is the density of the pump protein rather than the density of calcium release channels.
3. The third phase identified the relationship between the L-type calcium channels of the plasmalemma and the T-tubules in cardiac and skeletal muscles. Specifically, she worked with CaV channels, or dihydropyridine receptors (DHPRs), and the calcium release channels of the sarcoplasmic reticulum (RyRs).
4. The fourth phase examined the supramolecular complex that enables several molecules in the sarcoplasmic reticulum, which regulate calcium release, to interact with one another. Franzini-Armstrong continues to employ structural approaches to better understand the various molecular interactions.

== Personal life ==
Franzini-Armstrong is married to Clay Armstrong, a professor of physiology at the University of Pennsylvania.

== Honors and awards ==
Franzini-Armstrong's honors include a Fellowship from Scuola Normale Superiore from 1956 to 1960 in Pisa, Italy, followed by a postdoctoral fellowship (Perfezionamento) from 1961 to 1990. From 1983 to 1987, she was a member of the molecular cytology study section. In 1988, she was the director of the Gordon Research Conference on excitation-contraction coupling. From 1988 to 1990, she was a member of the Scientific Advisory Committee of the Muscular Dystrophy Association, and a council member of the Biophysical Society. In 1989, she was the co-recipient (with Dr. Knox Chandler) of the K.C. Cole Award of the Biophysical Society. In 1990, she became the co-chairman of the Biophysical Society Symposium on Excitation-Contraction Coupling. In 1995, she was inducted into the National Academy of Sciences, and in 1997, she was awarded an honorary MD from the University of Pisa. In 2001, she was inducted into the Royal Society London as a foreign member. She was inducted into the European Academy of Sciences in 2005, followed by the 2007 Founder's Award from the Biophysical Society.
