= Leo Sachs =

Israeli molecular biologist (1924–2013)

- ליאו זקס
- Leo Sachs, 1955
- Born: 14 October 1924; Leipzig, Saxony
- Died: 12 December 2013 (aged 89)
- Education: University of Wales, Bangor (BSc), Cambridge University (PhD 1951)
- Known for: Discovery of interleukins
- Awards: Israel Prize, Wolf Prize in Medicine, and numerous others
- Scientific career
- Fields: Molecular biology
- Institutions: Weizmann Institute of Science

Leo Sachs (Hebrew: ליאו זקס; 14 October 1924 – 12 December 2013) was a German-born Israeli molecular biologist and cancer researcher. Born in Leipzig, he emigrated to the United Kingdom in 1933, and to Israel in 1952. There he joined the Weizmann Institute of Science.

== Biography ==
Leo Sachs moved to Britain with his family in 1933 following Hitler's rise to power. In 1952 he received a BSc from the University of Wales in Bangor. His original dream was to help establish a kibbutz in Palestine, and he even spent two years as a farm laborer, milking cows. But the doors to Palestine were virtually closed by the British, so Sachs began studying agricultural botany at the University of Wales, became fascinated along the way by genetics and development, and ended up completing a PhD in genetics in 1951 at Cambridge University.

Upon moving to Israel, he began to contribute to the fledgling country in the way he knew best – as a geneticist at the Weizmann Institute. Because there were no animal studies yet at the Institute, Sachs started working on a theory that human amniotic fluid, which bathes the baby in the womb, contains fetal cells that provide information about the fetus. His research proved him right, showing that these cells can be used to determine the baby's gender and other important genetic properties. Sachs's research formed the basis for amniocentesis, the widely used prenatal diagnosis of human diseases.

Eventually, Sachs secured his own laboratory and a supply of mice and began working on a question that would anchor his research throughout: What controls normal development and what happens when development goes wrong? Why does the machinery in cancer cells run amok, causing abnormal proliferation? Focusing on blood stem cells, a small group of bone marrow cells that produce some 200 billion new blood cells every day, Sachs ended up, in 1963, designing the first cell culture system able to grow, clone, and induce the development of different types of normal blood cells. Using this process, he subsequently discovered and identified a family of proteins that plays a key role in controlling normal blood cell development. Later named colony stimulating factors (CSF) and interleukins, one of these CSF proteins is now used worldwide in a variety of clinical procedures, including boosting the production of infection-fighting white blood cells in cancer patients undergoing chemotherapy or radiation, and improving the success of bone marrow and peripheral blood cell transplants.

Sachs also demonstrated, for the first time, that malignancy can be reversed. He showed that the proteins he had identified, along with some other compounds, set leukemic cells back on the right track – inducing them to differentiate into normal-behaving mature cells. This approach, using retinoic acid combined with chemotherapy, is now standard procedure in treating human promyelocytic leukemia, and it has greatly increased survival rates.

At the Weizmann Institute, he established a section on genetics and virology and for 27 years, from 1962 to 1989, served as head of the institute's genetics department. In addition, between 1974 and 1979 he served as dean of Weizmann's biology faculty.

== Awards and honours ==
- In 1965, he was elected Member of the European Molecular Biology Organisation;
- In 1972, Sachs was awarded the Israel Prize, for natural sciences
- In 1975 he was elected Member, Israel Academy of Sciences and Humanities;
- In 1977 Sachs was awarded the Rothschild Prize in the Biological Sciences;
- In 1980, he was awarded the Wolf Prize in Medicine, becoming the first Israeli scientist to win the Wolf Prize; for his "contributions to knowledge of the function and dysfunction of the body cells through [his] studies on ... the elucidation of mechanisms governing the control and differentiation of normal and cancer cells".
- In 1983 Sachs was awarded the Bristol-Myers Squibb Award for Distinguished Achievement in Cancer Research, New York;
- In 1985 he was elected Doctor Honoris Causa, Bordeaux University, France;
- In 1986 Sachs was awarded The Royal Society Wellcome Foundation Prize, London;
- In 1989 Sachs was awarded the Alfred P. Sloan Prize, General Motors Cancer Research Foundation, New York;
- In 1995, he was also elected as a Foreign Associate to the U.S. National Academy of Sciences (NAS).
- In 1996, Sachs received the Ot Hanagid (Medal of the Governor) award, presented annually by Jerusalem's Shaare Zedek Medical Center, for his pioneering work in cancer research. The presentation noted that "He discovered and identified a group of proteins among them colony-stimulating factors and some interleukins that control the viability and growth of blood stem cells and their development into different types of mature blood cells." It noted further that his "research in the 1950s on the use of amniotic fluid to diagnose a fetus s genetic properties has formed the basis for today's prenatal diagnosis of human diseases."
- In 1997 he was elected a Fellow of the Royal Society
- In 1998, he was elected Foreign Member, Academia Europaea;
- In 1999, he was elected Member Honorary Fellow, University of Wales, Bangor;
- In 2000, he was elected Ham-Wasserman Lecture, American Society of Hematology, San Francisco;
- In 2001, he was awarded Honorary Life Membership Award, International Cytokine Society;
- In 2002, he was awarded Emet Prize for Life Sciences, Medicine and Genetics

== See also ==
- List of Israel Prize recipients
