= Francisco Bezanilla =

Chilean-American researcher

Francisco Bezanilla is a Chilean-American scientist and professor at the University of Chicago. He is a past president of the Biophysical Society and a member of the National Academy of Sciences.

== Biography ==
Raised in Santiago, Bezanilla took an early interest in science. When Chile hosted the 1962 World Cup, it was uncommon for people to own televisions, so Bezanilla and a friend began building their own television to watch the tournament. While the rudimentary TV was not completed in time for the World Cup, Bezanilla later built a better TV with commercial parts from Argentina, and Bezanilla's family used it for many years.

Bezanilla earned an undergraduate biology degree as well as master's and Ph.D. degrees in biophysics, all from the Pontifical Catholic University of Chile. Initially intending to earn a medical degree, Bezanilla shifted his focus to research and the Ph.D. program, finding that he liked how neurophysiology combined two of his interests, electronics and biology. He conducted research on the nerve cells of Humboldt squid at the Montemar Institute of Marine Biology.

Leaving Chile for the United States in 1969, Bezanilla completed a postdoctoral fellowship with the National Institutes of Health. While in the US, Bezanilla heard that the Humboldt squid was no longer available in Chilean waters. Also noting the political changes in Chile under Augusto Pinochet, he decided to stay in the US. Working on gating current experiments, he became a frequent collaborator with Clay Armstrong, who he had met at Montemar. In experiments at Woods Hole Marine Biological Laboratory, Bezanilla and Armstrong built their own signal averaging device and became the first to measure the tiny gating currents in sodium channels.

In 1977, Bezanilla became a neuroscience professor at the University of California, Los Angeles (UCLA) and later joined the University of Chicago, becoming the Lillian Eichelberger Cannon Professor in the Department of Pediatrics. Bezanilla was elected a member of the National Academy of Sciences in 2006. He was the 2013-2014 president of the Biophysical Society. Some of his recent work includes the application of light pulses to gold nanoparticles to activate neurons.

He is a member of the Editorial Board for PNAS.

Bezanilla's daughter Magdalena is a biologist and university professor.
