= Institute For Medical Research, Israel-Canada =

Israeli research institute

Institute for Medical Research, Israel-Canada, Hebrew University of Jerusalem
- המכון למחקר רפואי ישראל-קנדה, האוניברסיטה העברית בירושלים
- Type: Public
- Established: 2008
- Affiliations: UNIMED
- Chairperson: Prof. Ittai Ben-Porath
- Students: 3400
- Undergraduates: 2800
- Postgraduates: 600
- Location: Jerusalem, Israel
- Campus: Urban
- Nickname: IMRIC
- Website: medicine.ekmd.huji.ac.il/En/academicUnits/imric/Pages/Default.aspx

Institute for Medical Research, Israel-Canada (IMRIC) is a research institute affiliated with the Faculty of Medicine of the Hebrew University of Jerusalem.

== History ==
The Institute for Medical Research was founded in 2008. It conducts fundamental and applied research in the field of biomedicine and has five departments: Biochemistry and Molecular Biology; Developmental Biology and Cancer Research; Lautenberg Center for Immunology and Cancer Research; Medical Neurobiology; and Microbiology and Molecular Genetics.

IMRIC also offers a bachelor's degree course in Biomedical Sciences (B.Sc.Med), teaches the basic sciences for the undergraduate, pre-clinical programs of the Hebrew University's Faculty of Medicine and is the largest educational institute in Israel for graduate studies in Biomedical Sciences having about 600 master and doctoral students. The doctoral programs offer a wide range of multidisciplinary research areas in basic medical science and related fields and collaborative programs with clinicians from the Hadassah Medical Center.

The first and founding IMRIC chair was Professor Eitan Yefenof, who oversaw the establishment of the institute and shaped its vision and scope. The second chair was David Lichtstein, from 2008-2012. Since 2020, the chair of the institute has been Professor Rami Aqeilan who took over from Professor Haya Lorberboum-Galski, the chair from 2012-2020.

IMRIC is supported in part by the Canadian Friends of the Hebrew University (CFHU) through the establishment of scholarships and research funding. In addition, the CFHU aids in creating key collaborative medical research partnerships between Canada and Israel, such as the Alex U. Soyka Pancreatic Cancer Research Project, the Grafstein Network for Cancer Research the Canada-Israel International Fetal Alcohol Consortium and the Joseph and Wolf Lebovic Cancer Genomic and Immunotherapy Program.

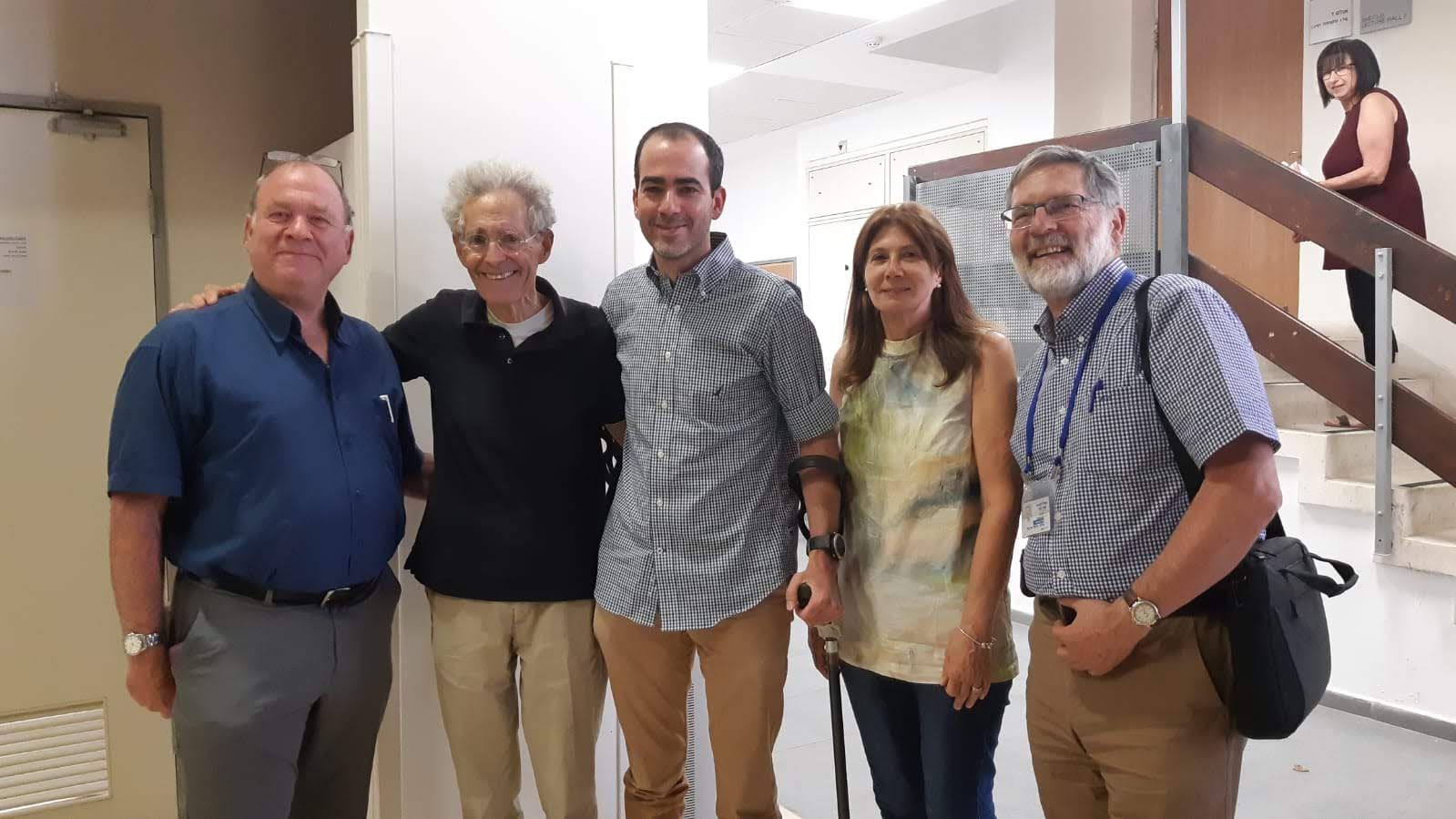
Hebrew University researchers

IMRIC is also the largest educational institute in Israel for graduate studies in Medical Sciences. In 2016, it had 600 master (MSc) and doctorate (PhD) students.

== Departments ==
- Biochemistry and Molecular Biology (24 research groups)
- Developmental Biology and Cancer Research (23 research groups)
- Lautenberg Center for Immunology and Cancer Research (14 research groups,) The center was established in 1968 as the first department of Immunology at the Hebrew University-Hadassah Medical School and named after the US senator, Frank Lautenberg.
- Medical Neurobiology (30 research groups)
- Microbiology and Molecular Genetics (33 research groups)

== Teaching divisions ==
The Institute provides a bachelor's degree in Biomedical Sciences. In addition, its faculty teaches the basic sciences for the undergraduate, pre-clinical programs of the Faculty of Medicine. These include programs for Medicine, Military Medicine, Dentistry, Biomedical Sciences, and Nursing. In 2016, more than 2,800 students were enrolled in these programs.

== Research hubs and centers ==
Research Hubs gather together scientists and clinicians focusing on a specific subject or disease, integrating various scientific and medical disciplines. Each hub consists of researchers from IMRIC, Hadassah Medical Center, The School of Pharmacy, The School of Public Health, Shaare Zedek Medical Center and more. The following research hubs are currently active:

1. Epigenetics and Common Human Diseases
2. The Tumor and its Microenvironment
3. Mitochondria
4. Developmental Processes, Malformations and Diseases
5. Cardiovascular Research
6. The Herbert and Dorothy Nadolny Cardio-Metabolic Diseases Research Hub
7. Microbe Brain Storming - MIBS
8. Muscle Degeneration Diseases
9. Virus-host Interactions and Viral Pathogenesis.
10. IMRIC Center for Addiction Research - ICARe

There are six research centers affiliated with IMRIC: The Lautenberg Center for General and Tumor Immunology; The Kuvin Center for the Study of Infectious and Tropical Diseases; The Brain Disease Research Center - BDRC; The Autism Center; The Hubert H. Humphrey Center for Experimental Medicine and Cancer Research; and The Rogoff Center for Research in Physiology.

== Awards and recognition ==
- Israel Prize: Howard Cedar 1999; Marcel Elkayem 2001; Aharon Razin 2004; Shaul Feldman 2005; Eli Keshet 2021
- The EMET Prize for Art, Science and Culture: Moshe Abeles 2004; Eli Keshet 2006; Howard Cedar & Aaron Razin 2009; Baruch Minke 2010; Hanna Engelberg-Kulka 2018; Yinon Ben-Neriah 2019
- TEVA Founders Prize: Moshe Abeles 1995; Yehezkel Bernoltz 2000; Yinon Ben-Nerya 2007; Ofer Mandelboim 2008; Orna Amster-Choder 2013; Yehudit Bergman & Eli Keshet 2014
- Gairdner Foundation International Award: Howard Cedar & Aaron Razin 2011
- Rothschild Prize in Life Sciences: Hagai Bergman 2016
- The Rappaport Prize: Yinon Ben-Neriah 2016; Ofer Mandelboim 2020; Yehudit Bergman 2021
- Boyalife Science & Science Translational Medicine Award in Stem Cells & Regenerative Medicine: Dr. Yosef Buganim, for his work in stem cells and regenerative medicine.
- Kaye Innovation award: Yechezkel Barenholz 1995; Arie Dagan & Shimon Gatt 2008; Raymond Kaempfer 2013; Noa Kaynan 2013; Ofer Mandelboim 2015; Pinchas Tsukerman 2016; Yuval Dor and Ruth Shemer 2017
- Louisa Gross Horwitz Prize (Columbia University) Howard Cedar & Aaron Razin 2016
- The Youdim Family Prize for Excellence in Cancer Research: Eli Pikarsky 2013; Rami Aqeilan 2017

== Notable faculty ==
- Hagai Bergman Professor, Department of Medical Neurobiology
- Howard Cedar, Emeritus Professor, Department of Developmental Biology & Cancer Research
- Aharon Razin, Emeritus Professor, Department of Developmental Biology & Cancer Research
- Eli Keshet, Emeritus Professor, Department of Developmental Biology & Cancer Research
- Yinon Ben Neriah, Professor, Department of Immunology & Cancer Research
- Hanah Margalit, Professor, Department of Microbiology & Molecular Genetics
- Ilan Rosenshine, Professor, Department of Microbiology & Molecular Genetics
- Ofer Mandelboim, Professor, Department of Immunology & Cancer Research
- Yuval Dor, Professor, Department of Developmental Biology & Cancer Research
- Eli Pikarsky, Professor, Department of Immunology & Cancer Research
- Rami I. Aqeilan, Professor, Department of Immunology & Cancer Research
- Sigal Ben-Yehuda, Professor, Department of Microbiology & Molecular Genetics
- Rotem Karni, Professor, Department of Biochemistry & Molecular Biology

== See also ==
- Higher education in Israel
- Healthcare in Israel
