= Joe Lutkenhaus =

American microbiologist

- Born: April 24, 1947 (age 79); Decorah, Iowa
- Education: Iowa State University; University of California, Los Angeles
- Known for: Discovering the Intracellular Structure of Bacterial Cells including that FtsZ, the ancestral homologue of eukaryotic tubulin, assembles into a cytokinetic ring (Z ring) that drives cell division in most bacteria, some archaea and chloroplasts
- Awards: Louisa Gross Horwitz Prize (2012)
- Scientific career
- Fields: Microbiology
- Workplaces: University of Kansas Medical Center

Joe Lutkenhaus is a professor at the University of Kansas Medical Center. He received a B.S. in organic chemistry from Iowa state University and then a PhD in biochemistry from the University of California, Los Angeles. Following his PhD, Lutkenhaus pursued his postdoctoral studies with William Donachie at the University of Edinburgh and then continued at the University of Connecticut Health Science center. He joined the Department of Microbiology at the University of Kansas Medical Center in 1980 and served as Chair from 2018-2024. In 2002, Lutkenhaus became a fellow of the American Academy of Microbiology.

Lutkenhaus discovered, among other things, that the FtsZ protein forms a ring around the division plane in bacteria and is thus a key factor in bacterial cell division.

== Honors ==
- 2002 Member of the American Academy of Microbiology
- 2012 Received the Louisa Gross Horwitz Prize along with Richard Losick (Harvard) and Lucy Shapiro (Stanford)
- 2014 Member of the National Academy of Sciences
