= Clay Armstrong =

American physiologist

- Born: Clay Margrave Armstrong; 1934 (age 91–92)
- Education: Washington University in St. Louis
- Known for: Understanding of the functions of ion channel proteins in nerve cells
- Spouse: Clara Franzini-Armstrong
- Awards: Louisa Gross Horwitz Prize, Albert Lasker Award for Basic Medical Research, Gairdner Foundation International Award
- Scientific career
- Fields: Ion channels
- Workplaces: Duke University; University of Rochester; University of Pennsylvania
- Doctoral advisor: Andrew Fielding Huxley

Clay Margrave Armstrong (born 1934) is an American physiologist and a former student of Andrew Fielding Huxley. Armstrong received his MD from Washington University School of Medicine in 1960. He is currently emeritus professor of physiology at the University of Pennsylvania. He has also held professorial appointments at Duke University and the University of Rochester.

Armstrong was awarded the Louisa Gross Horwitz Prize from Columbia University in 1996, and the Albert Lasker Award for Basic Medical Research (shared with Bertil Hille and Roderick MacKinnon) in 1999, for his seminal contributions to our understanding of the functions of ion channel proteins in nerve cells. Armstrong was elected to the National Academy of Sciences in 1987, and was elected as a Fellow of the American Academy of Arts and Sciences in 1999. He won the 2001 Gairdner Foundation International Award.

Armstrong is married to electron microscopist Clara Franzini-Armstrong.

== Ideas and influence ==
Much of the current understanding of ion channel structure and function can be attributed to the notion proposed by Clay Armstrong (with Bertil Hille). Armstrong provided the first general description of the K+ ion channel pore, including the fundamental ideas of a selectivity filter that can allow the rapid flow of K+ while excluding the flow of Na+ across the cell membrane; a wide inner vestibule; and a molecular gating element at the cytoplasmic side of the channel that controls the flow of ions through the pore. In addition, Armstrong's studies (with Francisco Bezanilla) that described the first measurement of charge movement associated with the activation of Na+-selective ion channels laid the groundwork for the current understanding of the molecular basis of electrical signaling in nerve and muscle cells.
