= Kevin Campbell (scientist) =

American biologist

- Education: Manhattan College; University of Rochester
- Known for: muscular dystrophy
- Scientific career
- Workplaces: University of Iowa

Kevin Peter Campbell is an Investigator for the Howard Hughes Medical Institute, UI Foundation Distinguished Professor, the Roy J. Carver Chair of Molecular Physiology and Biophysics, and head of the department; he is also professor of neurology and internal medicine at the University of Iowa.

== Research interest ==
Campbell, who is on the faculty at the Roy J. And Lucille A. Carver College of Medicine at the University of Iowa, is internationally recognized for his contributions to muscular dystrophy research. His discoveries of genetic and molecular causes of many forms of the disease have improved diagnosis of muscular dystrophies and provided a basis for developing new treatments of musical disability.

== Professional training ==
He received his B.S. degree in physics from Manhattan College in 1971, his master's degree from the University of Rochester School of Medicine and Dentistry, and his Ph.D. in Biophysics from the Department of Radiation Biology and Biophysics at the University of Rochester. He did postdoctoral studies in the laboratory of Dr. David MacLennan at the Banting and Best Department of Medical Research, University of Toronto, before moving to Iowa in 1981.

== Honors ==
Campbell is director of the Senator Paul D. Wellstone Muscular Dystrophy Cooperative Research Center and has been a Howard Hughes Medical Institute (HHMI) investigator since 1989. In 2006, Campbell was elected a Fellow of the American Academy of Arts and Sciences (AAAS).

Campbell, who has authored more than 300 scientific research articles, has received numerous awards and honors for his research, including a Scientific Achievement Award from the Muscular Dystrophy Association, the ASBMB-Amgen Award, the Duchenne-Erb-Preis Award, an American Academy of Neurology Lecturer Award, and March of Dimes Prize in Developmental Biology. He also is a member of the Institute of Medicine and the National Academy of Sciences. In 2025 he was awarded the Louisa Gross Horwitz Prize (Columbia University).
