= Yasutomi Nishizuka =

Japanese biochemist (1932–2004)

- 西塚 泰美
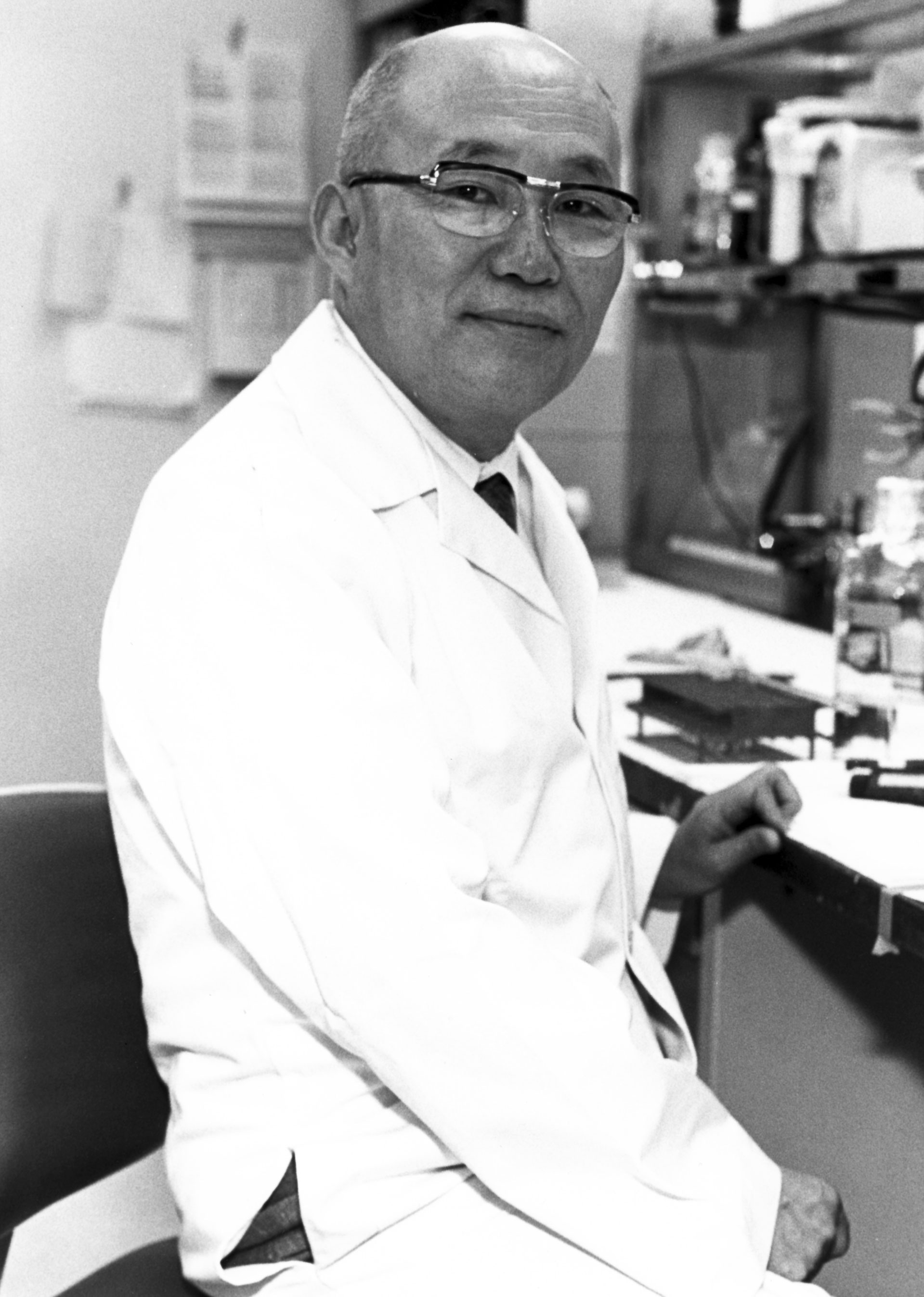
- Born: July 12, 1932; Ashiya, Hyōgo
- Died: November 4, 2004 (aged 72)
- Education: Kyoto University
- Known for: Protein kinase C
- Awards: Gairdner Award (1988); Lasker Award (1989); Kyoto Prize (1992); Wolf Prize (1994/95)
- Scientific career
- Fields: Biochemistry
- Workplaces: Kobe University; Kyoto University; Rockefeller University
- Doctoral advisor: Osamu Hayaishi
- Other academic advisors: Fritz Lipmann

Yasutomi Nishizuka, MJA, ForMemRS (西塚 泰美, Nishizuka Yasutomi; July 12, 1932 – November 4, 2004) was a prominent Japanese biochemist and made important contributions to the understanding of molecular mechanism of signal transduction across the cell membrane. In 1977, he discovered protein kinase C, which plays significant roles in a variety of intracellular signal transduction processes.

He was elected as a foreign member of the Royal Society (ForMemRS) in 1990 and as a member of the Japan Academy (MJA) in 1991.

== Birth and education ==
Nishizuka was born in 1932 at Ashiya-city in Japan. He obtained his medical degree in 1957 from the Faculty of Medicine, Kyoto University. Then, he completed his PhD in Medical Chemistry in 1962 from the same university under the supervision of Osamu Hayaishi who was a famous medical researcher in Japan at that time.

After completing his studies in Japan, he spent one year as a postdoctoral fellow in Fritz Lipmann's laboratory at the Rockefeller University.

== Academic career ==
Nishizuka was a research associate from 1962 to 1964, and an associate professor from 1964 to 1968 at Department of Medical Chemistry, Faculty of Medicine, Kyoto University.

From 1969 to 2001, he was the Professor and Chairman of the Department of Biochemistry, School of Medicine, Kobe University. He also served as the 11th president of the same university from 1995 to 2001. He led several medical students who later became leading figures in medical sciences, including Shinya Yamanaka, the 2012 Nobel Laureate, who developed induced pluripotent stem cells.

== Research contribution ==
Nishizuka is well known for the construction of the fundamental concepts of the intracellular signal transduction cascade through his discovery of protein kinase C, also known as C kinase, and his analysis of its function, which revealed a new intracellular signal transduction system and elucidated the regulatory mechanisms involved in many biological phenomena, including cancer cell growth.

== Recognition ==
Nishizuka received several awards and honors in his life. The major awards received by him are the Albert Lasker Basic Medical Research Award and the Wolf Prize in Medicine.

He won the Albert Lasker Basic Medical Research Award in 1989 for "his profound contributions to the understanding of signal transduction in cells, and for his discovery that carcinogens trigger cell growth by activating protein kinase C".

He won the Wolf Prize in Medicine along with Michael J. Berridge of the University of Cambridge for "their discoveries concerning cellular transmembrane signalling involving phospholipids and calcium".

The other major awards and honors received by Nishizuka are:

- Asahi Prize (1985)
- Japan Academy Prize (1986)
- Gairdner Foundation International Award (1988)
- Alfred P. Sloan, Jr. Prize (1988)
- Kyoto Prize (1992)
- Ernst Schering Prize (1995)

He was also elected as a member of several national academies, including the German Academy of Sciences Leopoldina.
