= Louisa Gross Horwitz Prize =

Annual prize awarded by Columbia University

Louisa Gross Horwitz Prize for Biology or Biochemistry
- Awarded for: Outstanding contribution in basic research in the fields of biology or biochemistry
- Country: United States
- Presented by: Columbia University
- First award: 1967
- Website: www.cumc.columbia.edu/research/horwitz-prize

The Louisa Gross Horwitz Prize for Biology or Biochemistry is an annual prize awarded by Columbia University to a researcher or group of researchers who have made an outstanding contribution in basic research in the fields of biology or biochemistry.

The prize was established at the bequest of S. Gross Horwitz and is named to honor his mother, Louisa Gross Horwitz, the daughter of trauma surgeon Samuel D. Gross. The prize was first awarded in 1967.

As of October 2026, 57 (47%) of the 121 prize recipients have subsequently been awarded the Nobel Prize in Physiology or Medicine (46) or Chemistry (11). It is considered one of the key precursors to future Nobel accolades .

== Recipients ==
- 1967 Luis Leloir (1970 Chemistry)
- 1968 Har Gobind Khorana (1968 Physiology or Medicine), Marshall Warren Nirenberg (1968 Physiology or Medicine)
- 1969 Max Delbrück (1969 Physiology or Medicine), Salvador E. Luria (1969 Physiology or Medicine)
- 1970 Albert Claude (1974 Physiology or Medicine), George E. Palade (1974 Physiology or Medicine), Keith R. Porter
- 1971 Hugh E. Huxley
- 1972 Stephen W. Kuffler
- 1973 Renato Dulbecco (1975 Physiology or Medicine), Harry Eagle, Theodore T. Puck
- 1974 Boris Ephrussi
- 1975 K. Sune D. Bergström (1982 Physiology or Medicine), Bengt Samuelsson (1982 Physiology or Medicine)
- 1976 Seymour Benzer, Charles Yanofsky
- 1977 Michael Heidelberger, Elvin A. Kabat, Henry G. Kunkel
- 1978 David Hubel (1981 Physiology or Medicine), Vernon Mountcastle, Torsten Wiesel (1981 Physiology or Medicine)
- 1979 Walter Gilbert (1980 Chemistry), Frederick Sanger (1980 Chemistry)
- 1980 César Milstein (1984 Physiology or Medicine)
- 1981 Aaron Klug (1982 Chemistry)
- 1982 Barbara McClintock (1983 Physiology or Medicine), Susumu Tonegawa (1987 Physiology or Medicine)
- 1983 Stanley Cohen (1986 Physiology or Medicine), Viktor Hamburger, Rita Levi-Montalcini (1986 Physiology or Medicine)
- 1984 Michael S. Brown (1985 Physiology or Medicine), Joseph L. Goldstein (1985 Physiology or Medicine)
- 1985 Donald D. Brown, Mark Ptashne
- 1986 Erwin Neher (1991 Physiology or Medicine), Bert Sakmann (1991 Physiology or Medicine)
- 1987 Günter Blobel (1999 Physiology or Medicine)
- 1988 Thomas R. Cech (1989 Chemistry), Philip A. Sharp (1993 Physiology or Medicine)
- 1989 Alfred G. Gilman (1994 Physiology or Medicine), Edwin G. Krebs (1994 Physiology or Medicine)
- 1990 Stephen C. Harrison, Michael G. Rossmann, Don C. Wiley
- 1991 Richard R. Ernst (1991 Chemistry), Kurt Wüthrich (2001 Chemistry)
- 1992 Christiane Nüsslein-Volhard (1995 Physiology or Medicine), Edward B. Lewis (1995 Physiology or Medicine)
- 1993 Nicole Marthe Le Douarin, Donald Metcalf
- 1994 Philippa Marrack, John W. Kappler
- 1995 Leland H. Hartwell (2001 Physiology or Medicine)
- 1996 Clay M. Armstrong, Bertil Hille
- 1997 Stanley B. Prusiner (1997 Physiology or Medicine)
- 1998 Arnold J. Levine, Bert Vogelstein
- 1999 Pierre Chambon, Robert Roeder, Robert Tjian
- 2000 H. Robert Horvitz (2002 Physiology or Medicine), Stanley J. Korsmeyer
- 2001 Avram Hershko (2004 Chemistry), Alexander Varshavsky
- 2002 James E. Rothman (2013 Physiology or Medicine), Randy W. Schekman (2013 Physiology or Medicine)
- 2003 Roderick MacKinnon (2003 Chemistry)
- 2004 Tony Hunter, Tony Pawson
- 2005 Ada Yonath (2009 Chemistry)
- 2006 Roger D. Kornberg (2006 Chemistry)
- 2007 Joseph G. Gall, Elizabeth H. Blackburn (2009 Physiology or Medicine), Carol W. Greider (2009 Physiology or Medicine)
- 2008 F. Ulrich Hartl, Arthur Horwich and Honorary Horwitz Prize to Rosalind Franklin
- 2009 Victor R. Ambros (2024 Physiology or Medicine), Gary Ruvkun (2024 Physiology or Medicine)
- 2010 Thomas J. Kelly, Bruce Stillman
- 2011 Jeffrey C. Hall (2017 Physiology or Medicine), Michael Rosbash (2017 Physiology or Medicine), Michael W. Young (2017 Physiology or Medicine)
- 2012 Richard Losick, Joe Lutkenhaus, Lucy Shapiro
- 2013 Edvard I. Moser (2014 Physiology or Medicine), May-Britt Moser (2014 Physiology or Medicine), John O’Keefe (2014 Physiology or Medicine)
- 2014 James P. Allison (2018 Physiology or Medicine)
- 2015 S. Lawrence Zipursky
- 2016 Howard Cedar, Aharon Razin, Gary Felsenfeld
- 2017 Jeffrey I. Gordon
- 2018 Pierre Chambon(Second time award), Ronald M. Evans, Bert O’Malley
- 2019 Lewis C. Cantley, David M. Sabatini, Peter K. Vogt
- 2020 Robert Fettiplace, A. James Hudspeth, Christine Petit
- 2021 Katalin Karikó (2023 Physiology or Medicine), Drew Weissman (2023 Physiology or Medicine)
- 2022 Karl Deisseroth, Peter Hegemann, Gero Miesenböck
- 2023 Zhijian Chen, Glen Barber
- 2024 Scott D. Emr, Wesley I. Sundquist
- 2025 Kevin Campbell, Louis M. Kunkel, Eric N. Olson
- 2026 Adrian Bird, Huda Zoghbi

== See also ==
- List of biology awards
- List of biochemistry awards
- List of medicine awards
