= Wolf Prize in Medicine =

One of six awards by the Wolf Foundation

The Wolf Prize in Medicine is awarded annually by the Wolf Foundation in Israel. It is one of the six Wolf Prizes established by the Foundation and awarded since 1978; the others are in Agriculture, Chemistry, Mathematics, Physics and Arts. The Prize has been stated to be the second most prestigious award in science and a significant predictor of the Nobel Prize.

== Laureates ==
Year	Name	Nationality	Citation
1978	George D. Snell	United States	for discovery of H-2 antigens, which codes for major transplantation antigens and the onset of the immune response.
1978	Jean Dausset	France	for discovering the HL-A system, the major histocompatibility complex in man and its primordial role in organ transplantation.
1978	Jon J. van Rood	Netherlands	for his contribution to the understanding of the complexity of the HL-A system in man and its implications in transplantation and in disease.
1979	Roger Wolcott Sperry	United States	for his studies on the functional differentiation of the right and left hemispheres of the brain.
1979	Arvid Carlsson	Sweden	for his work which established the role of dopamine as a neurotransmitter.
1979	Oleh Hornykiewicz	Austria	for opening a new approach in the control of Parkinson's disease by L-Dopa.
1980	César Milstein; Leo Sachs; James L. Gowans	Argentina / United Kingdom; Israel; United Kingdom	for their contributions to knowledge of the function and dysfunction of the body cells through their studies on the immunological role of the lymphocytes, the development of specific antibodies and the elucidation of mechanisms governing the control and differentiation of normal and cancer cells.
1981	Barbara McClintock	United States	for her imaginative and important contributions to our understanding of chromosome structure behaviour and function, and for her identification and description of transposable genetic (mobile) elements.
1981	Stanley N. Cohen	United States	for his concepts underlying genetic engineering; for constructing a biologically functional hybrid plasmid, and for achieving actual expression of a foreign gene implanted in E. coli by the recombinant DNA method.
1982	Jean-Pierre Changeux	France	for the isolation, purification and characterization of the acetylcholine receptor.
1982	Solomon H. Snyder	United States	for the development of the ways to label neurotransmitter receptors which provide tools to describe their properties.
1982	James W. Black	United Kingdom	for developing agents which block beta adrenergic and histamine receptors.
1983/4	No award		
1984/5	Donald F. Steiner	United States	for his discoveries concerning the bio-synthesis and processing of insulin which have had profound implications for basic biology and clinical medicine.
1986	Osamu Hayaishi	Japan	for his discovery of the oxygenase enzymes and elucidation of their structure and biological importance.
1987	Pedro Cuatrecasas; Meir Wilchek	Spain; Israel	for the invention and development of affinity chromatography and its applications to biomedical sciences.
1988	Henri G. Hers; Elizabeth F. Neufeld	Belgium; United States	for the biochemical elucidation of lysosomal storage diseases and the resulting contributions to biology, pathology, prenatal diagnosis and therapeutics.
1989	John Gurdon	United Kingdom	for his introduction of the xenopus oocyte into molecular biology and his demonstration that the nucleus of a differentiated cell and of the egg differ in expression but not in the content of genetic material.
1989	Edward B. Lewis	United States	for his demonstration and exploration of the genetic control of the development of body segments by homeotic genes.
1990	Maclyn McCarty	United States	for his part in the demonstration that the transforming factor in bacteria is due to deoxyribonucleic acid (DNA) and the concomitant discovery that the genetic material is composed of DNA.
1991	Seymour Benzer	United States	for having generated a new field of molecular neurogenetics by his pioneering research on the dissection of the nervous system and behavior by gene mutations.
1992	M. Judah Folkman	United States	for his discoveries which originated the concept and developed the field of angiogenesis research.
1993	No award		
1994/5	Michael J. Berridge; Yasutomi Nishizuka	United Kingdom; Japan	for their discoveries concerning cellular transmembrane signalling involving phospholipids and calcium.
1995/6	Stanley B. Prusiner	United States	for discovering prions, a new class of pathogens that cause important neurodegenerative disease by inducing changes in protein structure.
1997	Mary Frances Lyon	United Kingdom	for her hypothesis concerning the random inactivation of X-chromosomes in mammals.
1998	Michael Sela; Ruth Arnon	Israel; Israel	for their major discoveries in the field of immunology.
1999	Eric R. Kandel	United States	for the elucidation of the organismic, cellular and molecular mechanisms whereby short-term memory is converted to a long-term form.
2000	No award		
2001	Avram Hershko; Alexander Varshavsky	Israel / Hungary; Russia / United States	for the discovery of the ubiquitin system of intracellular protein degradation and the crucial functions of this system in cellular regulation.
2002/3	Ralph L. Brinster	United States	for the development of procedures to manipulate mouse ova and embryos, which has enabled transgenesis and its applications in mice.
2002/3	Mario Capecchi; Oliver Smithies	Italy / United States; United Kingdom / United States	for their contribution to the development of gene-targeting, enabling elucidation of gene function in mice.
2004	Robert A. Weinberg	United States	for his discovery that cancer cells including human tumor cells, carry somatically mutated genes-oncogenes that operate to drive their malignant proliferation.
2004	Roger Y. Tsien	United States	for his seminal contribution to the design and biological application of novel fluorescent and photolabile molecules to analyze and perturb cell signal transduction.
2005	Alexander Levitzki	Israel	for pioneering signal transduction therapy and for developing tyrosine kinase inhibitors as effective agents against cancer and a range of other diseases.
2005	Anthony R. Hunter	United Kingdom / United States	for the discovery of protein kinases that phosphorylate tyrosine residues in proteins, critical for the regulation of a wide variety of cellular events, including malignant transformation.
2005	Anthony J. Pawson	United Kingdom / Canada	for his discovery of protein domains essential for mediating protein-protein interactions in cellular signaling pathways, and the insights this research has provided into cancer.
2006/7	No award		
2008/9	Howard Cedar; Aharon Razin	United States; Israel	for their fundamental contributions to our understanding of the role of DNA methylation in the control of gene expression.
2010	Axel Ullrich	Germany	for groundbreaking cancer research that has led to development of new drugs.
2011	Shinya Yamanaka; Rudolf Jaenisch	Japan; Germany / United States	for the generation of induced pluripotent stem cells (iPS cells) from skin cells (SY) and demonstration that iPS cells can be used to cure genetic disease in a mammal, thus establishing their therapeutic potential (RJ).
2012	Ronald M. Evans	United States	for his discovery of the gene super-family encoding nuclear receptors and elucidating the mechanism of action of this class of receptors.
2013	No award		
2014	Nahum Sonenberg	Israel / Canada	for his discovery of the proteins that control the protein expression mechanism and their operation.
2014	Gary Ruvkun; Victor Ambros	United States; United States	for the discovery of the micro-RNA molecules that play a key role in controlling gene expression in natural processes and disease development.
2015	John Kappler; Philippa Marrack	United States; United States	for major contributions to the understanding of the key antigen-specific molecules, the T cell receptor for antigen and antibodies and how these molecules participate in immune recognition and effector function.
2015	Jeffrey Ravetch	United States	for major contributions to the understanding of the key antigen-specific molecules, the T cell receptor for antigen and antibodies and how these molecules participate in immune recognition and effector function.
2016	C. Ronald Kahn	United States	for pioneering studies defining insulin signaling and its alterations in disease.
2016	Lewis C. Cantley	United States	for discovery of phosphoinositide- 3 kinases and their roles in physiology and disease.
2017	James P. Allison	United States	for a revolution in cancer treatment due to the discovery of the immune control barrier.
2018	No award		
2019	Jeffrey M. Friedman	United States	for the discovery of Leptin and the entirely new endocrine system controlling body weight (and many other processes).
2020	Emmanuelle Charpentier	France	for deciphering and repurposing the bacterial CRISPR/Cas9 immune system for genome editing.
2020	Jennifer Doudna	United States	for revealing the medicine-revolutionizing mechanism of bacterial immunity via RNA-guided genome editing.
2021	Joan Steitz	United States	for her many fundamental contributions to the field of RNA biology.
2021	Lynne Elizabeth Maquat	United States	for discovering a mechanism that destroys mutant messenger RNA in cells, nonsense-mediated mRNA decay.
2021	Adrian Krainer	Uruguay / United States	for his fundamental mechanistic discoveries on RNA splicing leading to a world’s first treatment for spinal muscular atrophy (SMA).
2022	No award		
2023	Daniel J. Drucker	Canada	for pioneering work in elucidating the mechanisms and therapeutic potential of enteroendocrine hormones.
2024	Botond Roska; José-Alain Sahel	Hungary / Switzerland; France / United States	for sight-saving and vision restoration to blind people using optogenetics.
2025	Pamela J. Bjorkman	United States	for pioneering innovative strategies to overcome viral defenses through novel antibody-focused approaches.
2026	Charles Zuker	Chile / United States	for revolutionizing our understanding of taste, the last of our senses to be elucidated.

== Laureates per country ==
Below is a chart of all laureates per country (updated to 2026 laureates). Some laureates are counted more than once if they have multiple citizenships.

Country	Number of laureates
United States	40
United Kingdom	9
Israel	8
France	4
Japan	3
Canada	3
Germany	2
Hungary	2
Italy	1
Spain	1
Argentina	1
Netherlands	1
Sweden	1
Austria	1
Belgium	1
Uruguay	1
Russia	1
Switzerland	1

== See also ==
- List of medicine awards
