= Jue Chen (scientist) =

Chinese-born American biochemist

- Born: China
- Citizenship: United States
- Education: Ohio University; Harvard University
- Known for: Structural studies of ABC transporters
- Spouse: Roderick MacKinnon ( 2017-)
- Scientific career
- Workplaces: Rockefeller University; Purdue University
- Thesis: Studies of the influenza virus entry mechanism (1998)
- Doctoral advisor: Don C. Wiley

Jue Chen (Chinese: 陈珏) is a Chinese-born American structural biologist and biochemist. She is the William E. Ford professor of biochemistry and head of the Laboratory of Membrane Biology and Biophysics at the Rockefeller University and a Howard Hughes Medical Institute investigator. Her research focuses on elucidating the structure and function of ATP-binding cassette (ABC) transporters.

== Early life and education ==
Chen was born in Changsha, China and graduated from Changsha No. 1 High School in 1988. She studied at Tongji University in Shanghai before moving to the United States.

She earned a bachelor's degree in chemistry from Ohio University in 1993, and went on to pursue a PhD in biochemistry from Harvard University in 1998 under the mentorship of Don C. Wiley, where she discovered unique structural features of the influenza virus responsible for infection

== Career ==
Chen remained in Don C. Wiley's lab as a postdoctoral researcher before moving on to a postdoctoral fellowship at Baylor College of Medicine from 1999 to 2001 in the lab of Florante A. Quiocho, where she started studying the ATP binding cassette transporters

In 2002, Chen became an assistant professor at Purdue University where she won a number of teaching awards and published her research in high impact journals. In 2007, Chen was promoted to associate professor and subsequently, professor in 2011. In 2003 she was named a Pew Scholar and a Howard Hughes Medical Institute Investigator in 2008 In 2014, she moved to The Rockefeller University, where she is now the William E. Ford Professor and Head of Laboratory of Membrane Biology and Biophysics.

In 2019, she was elected to the National Academy of Sciences.

== Research ==
Chen is known for doing meaningful work in the fields of membrane biology and biophysics. She has published notable works in the fields of crystallography, intracellular transport, and, most recently, ATP-Binding Cassette Transporters and their roles in immune systems and disease. Her work on ABC transporters includes investigating their role in resistance to chemotherapy drugs; antigen presentation in adaptive immunity and viral infection; cystic fibrosis; and bacterial nutrition.

=== Visualizing maltose through crystallography ===
She has also been using crystallography to visualize how the maltose transporter protein converts the chemical energy of ATP hydrolysis into mechanical work through a series of conformational changes. This work applies specifically to bacterial cells, but has implications for humans.

=== ATP-binding cassette (ABC) transporters and P-glycoprotein and MRP1 ===
Chen’s interests have recently shifted to ABC transporters involved in the immune system and disease. These are a diverse group of membrane proteins utilizing the chemical energy of ATP hydrolysis to transport substrates against their electrochemical gradients. Her initial work with ABC transporters focused on two such transporters, P-glycoprotein and MRP1. This initial work has led to new insights into a mechanism by which some cancer cells mount resistance to chemotherapy. Discovered in the 1970s, P-glycoprotein recognizes an array of structurally related compounds and pumps them out of the cell. It plays a Jekyll-and-Hyde role in human health: When the cell in question is cancerous and the compounds are therapies targeting some aspect of the cell’s internal machinery, P-glycoprotein’s action reduces the effectiveness of chemotherapy.

=== ATP-binding cassette (ABC) transporters and CFTR ===
Chen's current research focuses on ABC transporters and their roles in, specifically, cystic fibrosis. Among the thousands of ABC transporters, one member, the cystic fibrosis transmembrane conductance regulator (CFTR), has evolved to function as an ATP-gated ion channel. Mutation of the CFTR gene causes cystic fibrosis (CF), a lethal disease with a prevalence of 1 in 2500 in Caucasian populations.

== Awards and honors ==
- Pew Scholar (2003)
- Anatrace Membrane Protein Award, Biophysical Society (2018)
- US National Academy of Sciences (2019)
