= Chen Jue (revolutionary) =

Chinese politician

Chen Jue (Chinese: 陈觉; pinyin: Chén Jué), once named Chen Bingxiang (Chinese: 陈炳祥; pinyin: Chén Bǐng Xiáng), (1903–October 14, 1928) was a Chinese communist who died in the early years of the revolution led by the Chinese Communist Party (CCP). He and his wife, Zhao Yunxiao (Chinese: 赵云霄; pinyin: Zhào Yún Xiāo), were both died to further the CCP.

== Personal Experience ==
Chen Jue was born in Liling, in the east of Hunan province in 1903. He began to study in a private school when he was 7. In 1922, he entered the prefectural high school of LiLing. Two years later, in 1924, he joined the Communist Youth League of China and was elected as the chairman of the student association of prefectural high school of Liling. In 1925, he joined the Chinese Communist Party. Then in September, he went to study in Moscow Sun Yat-sen University (Chinese: 莫斯科中山大学) where he met his wife.

== Family ==
His wife, Zhao Yunxiao (Chinese: 赵云霄; pinyin: Zhào Yún Xiāo), also died for the CCP. They met while studying in Moscow. They returned to Hunan from Moscow, now married, in September, 1927. After Chen was killed, his wife gave birth to their daughter in February, 1929. Zhao was soon killed on March 24, 1929. Then their baby daughter was fostered by Chen's parent. Their daughter died at the age of 4.

== Political and patriotic activities ==
When he and his wife returned from Moscow, China was under the rule of the Kuomintang. During that period, the Kuomintang committed a lot of wanton assassinations. In such a dangerous situation, they were sent to work in Hunan after returning from Moscow. In November 1927, he was sent to work in Liling with his wife. Under the leadership of the CCP, he took part in the guerrilla action of Liling and founding the communist government of Liling. In April 1928, he and his wife were sent to Changsha to work in Hunan provincial commission of the CCP. And in the summer of this year, he went to Changde to work as a secret agent of the CCP.

== His death ==
While he was working at the Secret Agent Committee of Changde (Chinese: 常德特委) in 1928, he was betrayed by a colleague. Then he was arrested by the Kuomintang. When he was put on trial, he cursed at the military commander Chen Jiayou (Chinese: 陈嘉佑). He was delivered to Changsha to have another trial. He was killed by the Kuomintang.
