= Roderick MacKinnon =

American biophysicist, neuroscientist, and businessman (born 1956)

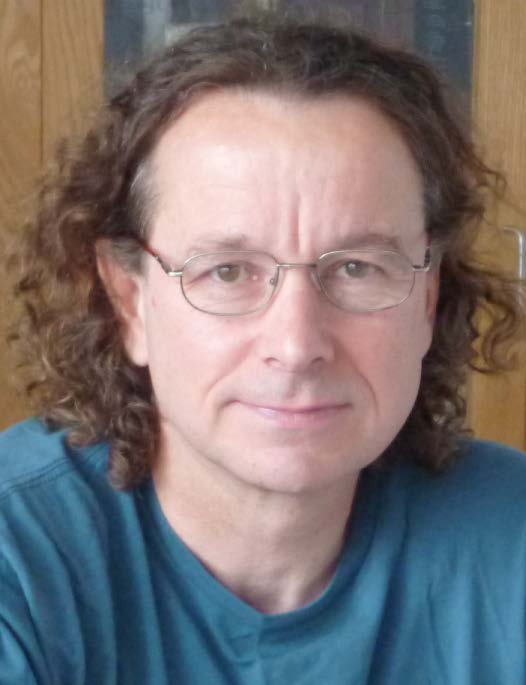
- MacKinnon in 2014
- Born: February 19, 1956 (age 70); Burlington, Massachusetts, U.S.
- Education: Brandeis University (BA); Tufts University (MD)
- Known for: Potassium Channel Structure
- Spouse: Jue Chen (2017–)
- Awards: Newcomb Cleveland Prize (1997); W. Alden Spencer Award (1998); Albert Lasker Award for Basic Medical Research (1999); Perl-UNC Prize (2001); Louisa Gross Horwitz Prize (2003); Nobel Prize in Chemistry (2003); Bijvoet Medal (2004)
- Scientific career
- Fields: Chemistry
- Workplaces: Cornell University; Harvard University; The Rockefeller University

Roderick MacKinnon (born February 19, 1956) is an American biophysicist, neuroscientist, and businessman. He is a professor of molecular neurobiology and biophysics at Rockefeller University who won the Nobel Prize in Chemistry together with Peter Agre in 2003 for his work on the structure and operation of ion channels.

== Biography ==
=== Early life and education ===
MacKinnon was born in Burlington, Massachusetts and initially attended the University of Massachusetts Boston. MacKinnon then transferred to Brandeis University after one year, and there he received a bachelor's degree in biochemistry in 1978, studying calcium transport through the cell membrane for his honors thesis in Christopher Miller's laboratory. It was also at Brandeis where MacKinnon met his future wife and working-colleague Alice Lee, who is an organic chemist.

After receiving his bachelor's degree from Brandeis University, MacKinnon entered medical school at Tufts University. He got his M.D. in 1982 and received training in Internal Medicine at Beth Israel Hospital in Boston. He did not feel satisfied enough with the medical profession, so in 1986 he returned to Christopher Miller's laboratory at Brandeis for postdoctoral studies.

=== Career ===
In 1989 he was appointed assistant professor at Harvard University where he studied the interaction of the potassium channel with a specific toxin derived from scorpion venom, acquainting himself with methods of protein purification and X-ray crystallography. In 1996 he moved to Rockefeller University as a professor and head of the Laboratory of Molecular Neurobiology and Biophysics where he started to work on the structure of the potassium channel. These channels are of particular importance to the nervous system and the heart and enable potassium ions to cross the cell membrane.

== Scientific contributions ==
Potassium channels demonstrate a seemingly counterintuitive activity: they permit the passage of potassium ions, whereas they do not allow the passage of the much smaller sodium ions. Before MacKinnon's work, the detailed molecular architecture of potassium channels and the means by which they conduct ions were only generally known and indirectly inferred.

In 1998, despite barriers to the structural study of integral membrane proteins that had thwarted most attempts for decades, MacKinnon and colleagues determined the three-dimensional molecular structure of a potassium channel from an actinobacterium, Streptomyces lividans, utilizing X-ray crystallography. With this structure and other biochemical experiments, MacKinnon and colleagues were able to explain the exact mechanism by which potassium channel selectivity occurs.

His prize-winning research was conducted primarily at the Cornell High Energy Synchrotron Source (CHESS) of Cornell University, and at the National Synchrotron Light Source (NSLS) of Brookhaven National Laboratory.

MacKinnon was elected to the American Philosophical Society in 2005. In 2007 he became a foreign member of the Royal Netherlands Academy of Arts and Sciences.

== Awards and recognition ==
- 1997: Newcomb Cleveland Prize
- 1998: W. Alden Spencer Award (Columbia University)
- 1999: Albert Lasker Basic Medical Research Award
- 2000: Rosenstiel Award
- 2001: Gairdner Foundation International Award
- 2003: Louisa Gross Horwitz Prize (Columbia University)
- 2003: Nobel Prize in Chemistry

== Business activities ==
MacKinnon is co-inventor with his friend and scientific collaborator, neurobiologist Bruce Bean of Harvard Medical School, of a dietary supplement for treating and preventing muscle cramps; they tested it in clinical trials and are co-founders a company to commercialize their invention, Flex Pharma. Christoph Westphal and Jennifer Cermak were co-founders as well.

The company undertook drug development of a formulation of supplement as a drug candidate for neuromuscular disorders like ALS, and raised a $40 million Series A round. The company had an $86 million initial public offering in 2015. In 2016, the company launched "HotShot" as a dietary supplement for endurance athletes. In June 2018 the company halted clinical development of the drug candidate due to tolerability issues, cut its workforce, and said it was considering its strategy. In July 2018 MacKinnon resigned from the board of directors.
