= Gary Felsenfeld =

American geneticist and molecular biologist (1929–2024)

- Photo courtesy of NIH
- Born: November 18, 1929; New York City, U.S.
- Died: May 1, 2024 (aged 94)
- Education: Harvard University (A.B.), California Institute of Technology (Ph.D.), University of Oxford (postdoc)
- Known for: Chromatin structure, gene regulation, epigenetics, discovery of CTCF
- Awards: Louisa Gross Horwitz Prize (2016), Merck Award (1987), Distinguished Presidential Rank Award (1988)
- Scientific career
- Fields: Molecular biology, biochemistry
- Workplaces: National Institutes of Health
- Doctoral advisor: Linus Pauling

Gary Felsenfeld (November 18, 1929 – May 1, 2024) was an American molecular biologist and biochemist known for his pioneering work in chromatin biology and gene regulation. Over a career spanning more than six decades at the National Institutes of Health (NIH), he made seminal contributions to the understanding of chromatin structure and the epigenetic mechanisms controlling gene expression.

== Early life and education ==
Felsenfeld was born in New York City and developed an early interest in science, inspired by a fluoroscope demonstration during a childhood visit to an allergist. He attended Stuyvesant High School, graduating as valedictorian in 1947. That same year, he was a top-10 finalist in the Westinghouse Science Talent Search for a project on daylight-compatible X-ray film, which earned him a trip to Washington, D.C., and a visit to the NIH.

He earned his A.B. in chemistry from Harvard University in 1951, conducting undergraduate research under John Edsall. He then pursued doctoral studies at the California Institute of Technology under Linus Pauling, receiving his Ph.D. in chemistry in 1955. Following a postdoctoral fellowship at the University of Oxford with Charles Coulson, Felsenfeld returned to the U.S.

== Career ==
In 1956, Felsenfeld joined the Public Health Service and began work at the National Institute of Mental Health, where he studied polynucleotides and contributed to the discovery of the first three-stranded nucleic acid molecule.

From 1958 to 1961, he served as an assistant professor of biophysics at the University of Pittsburgh. In 1961, he became a founding member of the Laboratory of Molecular Biology at the National Institute of Diabetes and Digestive and Kidney Diseases (NIDDK) within the NIH. He was appointed Chief of the Section on Physical Chemistry and later served as Chief of the Laboratory of Molecular Biology.

Felsenfeld remained at the NIH for the rest of his career, becoming an NIH Distinguished Investigator and Scientist Emeritus. He was known for his hands-on approach to research and mentorship, often working at the lab bench alongside his trainees.

== Research contributions ==
Felsenfeld's research significantly advanced the understanding of chromatin structure and gene regulation:

- Triple-stranded nucleic acids: In collaboration with David Davies and Alexander Rich, he demonstrated the existence of triple-stranded RNA structures, expanding the understanding of nucleic acid configurations.
- Chromatin structure: He was among the first to investigate DNA folding and chromatin organization, using micrococcal nuclease as a probe to study nucleosome positioning and histone–DNA interactions.
- Gene regulation: Felsenfeld's work on the β-globin gene cluster led to the identification of regulatory elements known as "insulators" which block interactions between enhancers and promoters. He discovered that the protein CTCF functions as a major genomic boundary element, playing a crucial role in the three-dimensional organization of the genome and regulation of gene expression.
- Epigenetics: His studies on chromatin boundaries and long-range genomic interactions contributed to the foundation of the field of epigenetics, influencing subsequent research on cellular differentiation and development.

== Awards and honors ==
Felsenfeld received numerous accolades for his scientific contributions, including the following:

- Louisa Gross Horwitz Prize (2016): Awarded by Columbia University for outstanding basic research in biology or biochemistry, recognizing his work on chromatin structure and gene regulation.
- Merck Award (1987): Presented by the American Society for Biochemistry and Molecular Biology for his achievements in biochemistry.
- Presidential Rank Award (1988): Conferred by the U.S. government for sustained extraordinary accomplishments in the federal service.

He was elected to several organizations, including the National Academy of Sciences in 1976, the American Association for the Advancement of Science in 1980, and the American Academy of Arts and Sciences in 1981.

== Personal life ==
Felsenfeld was married to Naomi for nearly 68 years and had three children and several grandchildren and great-grandchildren. He was known for his passion for science, music, literature, and art. He died on May 1, 2024, at the age of 94.
