= Rebecca Sitsapesan =

British cardiac pharmacologist (1959–2022)

- Born: June 1959
- Died: 2 June 2022 (aged 62)
- Education: University of Aberdeen; University of Leeds; University of Strathclyde
- Scientific career
- Fields: Pharmacology
- Workplaces: National Heart and Lung Institute; University of Bristol; University of Oxford; Hertford College, Oxford

Rebecca Sitsapesan (1959 – 2 June 2022) was a British pharmacologist. She was a professor and cardiac pharmacologist known for her work on single channel recording, ryanodine receptors and TRIC proteins. She was Professor of Pharmacology at the University of Oxford from 2013 to 2019, and Emeritus Professor from 2019 until her death in 2022.

== Education ==
Sitsapesan studied an undergraduate degree in pharmacology at the University of Aberdeen, graduating in 1981 and going on to study an MSc on cardiovascular sciences at the University of Leeds. She then completed a PhD at the University of Strathclyde focusing on the effects of opiates on ischemia-induced arrhythmias.

== Career ==
Sitsapesan later took up a post at the National Heart and Lung Institute at Imperial College, London where she was made a British Heart Foundation lecturer in 1991. In 2001, she moved to the University of Bristol where she was made the Professor of Pharmacology in 2011. While there, she studied the role of FKBP12.6 and cADPR molecules in regulating the channels through which calcium ions flow. She also worked on the relation between protein kinase C and excessive amounts of calcium release into heart muscle, which can cause arrhythmias.

In August 2013, Sitsapesan moved to the University of Oxford, taking up the post of Professor of Pharmacology. She became a Tutorial Fellow in medicine at Hertford College in 2014, and was a member of the college's governing body and its academic committee. She headed a group studying ion channels and the release of Ca^{2+} from intracellular stores. She also collaborated with Antony Galione on the type 2 two-pore channel and the effects of ion release channels on lysosomes.

She retired from her posts in 2019 due to ill health, becoming Emeritus Professor of Pharmacology and an Emeritus Fellow of Hertford College. She continued to contribute to and publish papers and supervise her laboratory until a few days before her death.

== Personal life ==
Sitsapesan was a Christian. She was married and had children. She died on 2 June 2022 at the age of 62.
