= TPCN1 =

Protein-coding gene in the species Homo sapiens

Identifiers
- Aliases: TPCN1, TPC1, two pore segment channel 1
- External IDs: OMIM: 609666; MGI: 2182472; GeneCards: TPCN1

Gene location (Human)
| Chr. | Chromosome 12 (human) |
| Band | 12q24.13 | Start | 113,221,050 bp |
| Band | 12q24.13 | End | 113,298,585 bp |

Gene location (Mouse)
| Chr. | Chromosome 5 (mouse) |
| Band | 5|5 F | Start | 120,672,218 bp |
| Band | 5|5 F | End | 120,726,738 bp |
RNA expression pattern
| Bgee | Human / Mouse (ortholog); Top expressed in: right hemisphere of cerebellum; right lobe of thyroid gland; left lobe of thyroid gland; gastric mucosa; apex of heart; right adrenal gland; right adrenal cortex; body of pancreas; left adrenal cortex; left ovary / Top expressed in: lacrimal gland; saccule; otic vesicle; yolk sac; aortic valve; ankle; intestinal villus; molar; ascending aorta; submandibular gland; More reference expression data |
| BioGPS | n/a |
Gene ontology
| Molecular function | calcium channel activity; voltage-gated ion channel activity; ion channel activity; protein binding; identical protein binding; NAADP-sensitive calcium-release channel activity; voltage-gated calcium channel activity; calcium activated cation channel activity |
| Cellular component | integral component of membrane; endosome; membrane; plasma membrane; lysosomal membrane; lysosome; endosome membrane; CatSper complex |
| Biological process | membrane depolarization during action potential; positive regulation of autophagy; regulation of ion transmembrane transport; ion transport; ion transmembrane transport; calcium ion transmembrane transport; calcium ion transport; transmembrane transport; release of sequestered calcium ion into cytosol; flagellated sperm motility |
Sources:Amigo / QuickGO
Orthologs
| Databases | NCBI: entry; OMA: entry |
| Species | Human | Mouse |
| Entrez | 53373 | 252972 |
| Ensembl | ENSG00000186815 | ENSMUSG00000032741 |
| UniProt | Q9ULQ1 | Q9EQJ0 |
| RefSeq (mRNA) | NM_001143819; NM_001301214; NM_017901; NM_001351346; NM_001351347 | NM_145853 |
| RefSeq (protein) | NP_001137291; NP_001288143; NP_060371; NP_001338275; NP_001338276 | NP_665852 |
| Location (UCSC) | Chr 12: 113.22 – 113.3 Mb | Chr 5: 120.67 – 120.73 Mb |
| PubMed search |
- Wikidata
| View/Edit Human | View/Edit Mouse |

Two pore segment channel 1 (TPC1) is a human protein encoded by the TPCN1 gene. The protein encoded by this gene is an ion channel. In contrast to other calcium and sodium channels which have four homologous domains, each containing six transmembrane segments (S1 to S6), TPCN1 only contains two domains (each containing segments S1 to S6).

== Structure ==
The structure of a TPC1 ortholog from Arabidopsis thaliana has been solved by two laboratories. The structures were solved using X-ray crystallography and contained the fold of a voltage-gated ion channel and EF hands. Only a single voltage sensor domain appears to responsible for voltage sensing.

== Filoviral infections ==
Genetic knockout and pharmacological inhibition experiments demonstrate that the two-pore channels, TPC1 and TPC2, are required for infection by filoviruses Ebola and Marburg in mice.

== See also ==
- Two-pore channel
