= TRPA =

TRPA can refer to:

- Tahoe Regional Planning Agency
- TRPA, a family of transient receptor potential ion channels
