= Calcium channel opener =

Type of drug

A calcium channel opener is a type of drug which facilitates ion transmission through calcium channels.

An example is Bay K8644, which is an analogue of nifedipine that specifically and directly activates L-type voltage-dependent calcium channels.

In contrast to Bay K8644, which is not for clinical use, ambroxol is a frequently used mucolytic drug that triggers lysosomal secretion by mobilizing calcium from acidic calcium stores. This effect does most likely not occur by a direct interaction between the drug and a lysosomal calcium channel, but indirectly by neutralizing the acidic pH within lysosomes. Calcium permeable ion channels in lysosomal membranes that may be activated by a luminal pH increase include two pore channels (TPCs), mucolipin TRP channels (TRPMLs) and purinergic receptors of the P2X channel type.

== See also ==
- Calcium channel blocker
