= TPCN2 =

Protein-coding gene in the species Homo sapiens

Identifiers
- Aliases: TPCN2, SHEP10, TPC2, two pore segment channel 2
- External IDs: OMIM: 612163; MGI: 2385297; GeneCards: TPCN2

Gene location (Human)
Chr.	Chromosome 11 (human)
Band	11q13.3	Start	69,048,932 bp
Band	11q13.3	End	69,136,316 bp

Gene location (Mouse)
Chr.	Chromosome 7 (mouse)
Band	7|7 F5	Start	144,740,261 bp
Band	7|7 F5	End	144,837,748 bp
RNA expression pattern
Bgee	Human / Mouse (ortholog); Top expressed in: pancreatic ductal cell; mucosa of ileum; gastric mucosa; muscle layer of sigmoid colon; body of uterus; monocyte; right hemisphere of cerebellum; tibialis anterior muscle; left uterine tube; right lobe of liver / Top expressed in: granulocyte; inner renal medulla; stroma of bone marrow; lip; ventricular zone; spermatid; yolk sac; embryo; blastocyst; embryo; More reference expression data
BioGPS	n/a
Gene ontology
Molecular function	calcium channel activity; voltage-gated ion channel activity; ion channel activity; protein binding; identical protein binding; protein kinase binding; NAADP-sensitive calcium-release channel activity; voltage-gated calcium channel activity
Cellular component	integral component of membrane; membrane; plasma membrane; endosome membrane; lysosome; lysosomal membrane
Biological process	release of sequestered calcium ion into cytosol; membrane depolarization during action potential; response to vitamin D; regulation of ion transmembrane transport; cellular calcium ion homeostasis; ion transport; ion transmembrane transport; regulation of autophagy; calcium ion transmembrane transport; lysosome organization; calcium-mediated signaling; calcium ion transport; transmembrane transport; smooth muscle contraction
Sources:Amigo / QuickGO
Orthologs
Databases	NCBI: entry; OMA: entry
Species	Human	Mouse
Entrez	219931	233979
Ensembl	ENSG00000162341	ENSMUSG00000048677
UniProt	Q8NHX9	Q8BWC0
RefSeq (mRNA)	NM_139075	NM_146206
RefSeq (protein)	NP_620714	NP_666318
Location (UCSC)	Chr 11: 69.05 – 69.14 Mb	Chr 7: 144.74 – 144.84 Mb
PubMed search
- Wikidata
View/Edit Human	View/Edit Mouse

Two pore segment channel 2 (TPC2) is a protein which in humans is encoded by the TPCN2 gene. TPC2 is an ion channel, however, in contrast to other calcium and sodium channels which have four homologous domains, each containing 6 transmembrane segments (S1 to S6), TPCN1 only contains two domain (each containing segments S1 to S6).

== Structure ==
TPC2 is homologous to TPC1, the best characterized member of the TPC family. The structure of a TPC1 ortholog from Arabidopsis thaliana has been solved by two laboratories. The structures were solved using X-ray crystallography and contained the fold of a voltage-gated ion channel and EF hands.

== Filoviral infections ==
Genetic knockout and pharmacological inhibition experiments demonstrate that the two-pore channels, TPC1 and TPC2, are required for infection by Filoviruses Ebola and Marburg in mice.

== See also ==
- Two-pore channel
