= Ion channel =

Pore-forming membrane protein

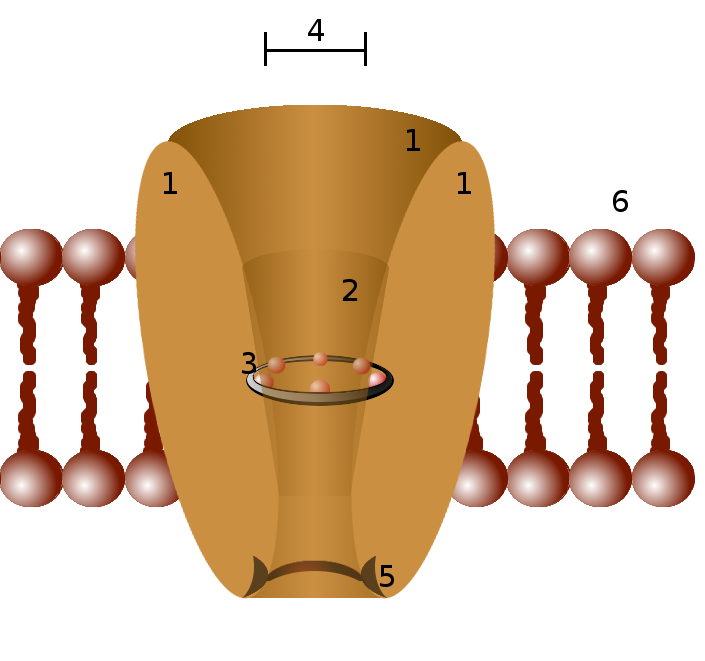
Schematic diagram of an ion channel. 1 - channel domains (typically four per channel), 2 - outer vestibule, 3 - selectivity filter, 4 - diameter of selectivity filter, 5 - phosphorylation site, 6 - cell membrane.

Ion channels are pore-forming membrane proteins that allow ions to pass through the channel pore. Their functions include establishing a resting membrane potential, shaping action potentials and other electrical signals by gating the flow of ions across the cell membrane, controlling the flow of ions across secretory and epithelial cells, and regulating cell volume. Ion channels are present in the membranes of all cells. Ion channels are one of the two classes of ionophoric proteins, the other being ion transporters.

The study of ion channels often involves biophysics, electrophysiology, and pharmacology, while using techniques including voltage clamp, patch clamp, immunohistochemistry, X-ray crystallography, fluoroscopy, and RT-PCR. Their classification as molecules is referred to as channelomics.

== Basic features ==
Structure of the KcsA potassium channel (PDB: 1K4C). The two planes indicate the hydrocarbon boundaries of the lipid bilayer and were calculated with the ANVIL algorithm.

There are two distinctive features of ion channels that differentiate them from other types of ion transporter proteins:

1. The rate of ion transport through the channel is very high (often 10^{6} ions per second or greater).
2. Ions pass through channels down their electrochemical gradient, which is a function of ion concentration and membrane potential, "downhill", without the input (or help) of metabolic energy (e.g. ATP, co-transport mechanisms, or active transport mechanisms).

Ion channels are located within the membrane of all excitable cells, and of many intracellular organelles. They are often described as narrow, water-filled tunnels that allow only ions of a certain size and/or charge to pass through. This characteristic is called selective permeability. The archetypal channel pore is just one or two atoms wide at its narrowest point and is selective for specific species of ion, such as sodium or potassium. However, some channels may be permeable to the passage of more than one type of ion, typically sharing a common charge: positive (cations) or negative (anions). Ions often move through the segments of the channel pore in a single file nearly as quickly as the ions move through the free solution. In many ion channels, passage through the pore is governed by a "gate", which may be opened or closed in response to chemical or electrical signals, temperature, or mechanical force.

Ion channels are integral membrane proteins, typically formed as assemblies of several individual proteins. Such "multi-subunit" assemblies usually involve a circular arrangement of identical or homologous proteins closely packed around a water-filled pore through the plane of the membrane or lipid bilayer. For most voltage-gated ion channels, the pore-forming subunit(s) are called the α subunit, while the auxiliary subunits are denoted β, γ, and so on.

== Biological role ==
Because channels underlie the nerve impulse and because "transmitter-activated" channels mediate conduction across the synapses, channels are especially prominent components of the nervous system. Indeed, numerous toxins that organisms have evolved for shutting down the nervous systems of predators and prey (e.g., the venoms produced by spiders, scorpions, snakes, fish, bees, sea snails, and others) work by modulating ion channel conductance and/or kinetics. In addition, ion channels are key components in a wide variety of biological processes that involve rapid changes in cells, such as cardiac, skeletal, and smooth muscle contraction, epithelial transport of nutrients and ions, T-cell activation, and pancreatic beta-cell insulin release. In the search for new drugs, ion channels are a frequent target.

== Diversity ==
There are over 300 types of ion channels just in the cells of the inner ear. Ion channels may be classified by the nature of their gating, the species of ions passing through those gates, the number of gates (pores), and localization of proteins.

Further heterogeneity of ion channels arises when channels with different constitutive subunits give rise to a specific kind of current. Absence or mutation of one or more of the contributing types of channel subunits can result in loss of function and, potentially, underlie neurologic diseases.

=== Classification by gating ===
Ion channels may be classified by gating, i.e. what opens and closes the channels. For example, voltage-gated ion channels open or close depending on the voltage gradient across the plasma membrane, while ligand-gated ion channels open or close depending on binding of ligands to the channel.

==== Voltage-gated ====
Voltage-gated ion channels open and close in response to membrane potential.

- Voltage-gated sodium channels: This family contains at least 9 members and is largely responsible for action potential creation and propagation. The pore-forming α subunits are very large (up to 4,000 amino acids) and consist of four homologous repeat domains (I-IV) each comprising six transmembrane segments (S1-S6) for a total of 24 transmembrane segments. The members of this family also coassemble with auxiliary β subunits, each spanning the membrane once. Both α and β subunits are extensively glycosylated.
- Voltage-gated calcium channels: This family contains 10 members, though these are known to coassemble with α_{2}δ, β, and γ subunits. These channels play an important role in both linking muscle excitation with contraction as well as neuronal excitation with transmitter release. The α subunits have an overall structural resemblance to those of the sodium channels and are equally large.
  - Cation channels of sperm: This small family of channels, normally referred to as Catsper channels, is related to the two-pore channels and distantly related to TRP channels.
- Voltage-gated potassium channels (K_{V}): This family contains almost 40 members, which are further divided into 12 subfamilies. These channels are known mainly for their role in repolarizing the cell membrane following action potentials. The α subunits have six transmembrane segments, homologous to a single domain of the sodium channels. Correspondingly, they assemble as tetramers to produce a functioning channel.
- Some transient receptor potential channels: This group of channels, normally referred to simply as TRP channels, is named after their role in Drosophila phototransduction. This family, containing at least 28 members, is incredibly diverse in its method of activation. Some TRP channels seem to be constitutively open, while others are gated by voltage, intracellular Ca^{2+}, pH, redox state, osmolarity, and mechanical stretch. These channels also vary according to the ion(s) they pass, some being selective for Ca^{2+} while others are less selective, acting as cation channels. This family is subdivided into 6 subfamilies based on homology: classical (TRPC), vanilloid receptors (TRPV), melastatin (TRPM), polycystins (TRPP), mucolipins (TRPML), and ankyrin transmembrane protein 1 (TRPA).
- Hyperpolarization-activated cyclic nucleotide-gated channels: The opening of these channels is due to hyperpolarization rather than the depolarization required for other cyclic nucleotide-gated channels. These channels are also sensitive to the cyclic nucleotides cAMP and cGMP, which alter the voltage sensitivity of the channel's opening. These channels are permeable to the monovalent cations K^{+} and Na^{+}. There are 4 members of this family, all of which form tetramers of six-transmembrane α subunits. As these channels open under hyperpolarizing conditions, they function as pacemaking channels in the heart, particularly the SA node.
- Voltage-gated proton channels: Voltage-gated proton channels open with depolarization, but in a strongly pH-sensitive manner. The result is that these channels open only when the electrochemical gradient is outward, such that their opening will only allow protons to leave cells. Their function thus appears to be acid extrusion from cells. Another important function occurs in phagocytes (e.g. eosinophils, neutrophils, macrophages) during the "respiratory burst." When bacteria or other microbes are engulfed by phagocytes, the enzyme NADPH oxidase assembles in the membrane and begins to produce reactive oxygen species (ROS) that help kill bacteria. NADPH oxidase is electrogenic, moving electrons across the membrane, and proton channels open to allow proton flux to balance the electron movement electrically.

==== Ligand-gated (neurotransmitter) ====
Also known as ionotropic receptors, this group of channels open in response to specific ligand molecules binding to the extracellular domain of the receptor protein. Ligand binding causes a conformational change in the structure of the channel protein that ultimately leads to the opening of the channel gate and subsequent ion flux across the plasma membrane. Examples of such channels include the cation-permeable nicotinic acetylcholine receptors, ionotropic glutamate-gated receptors, acid-sensing ion channels (ASICs), ATP-gated P2X receptors, and the anion-permeable γ-aminobutyric acid-gated GABA_{A} receptor.

Ion channels activated by second messengers may also be categorized in this group, although ligands and second messengers are otherwise distinguished from each other.

==== Lipid-gated ====
This group of channels opens in response to specific lipid molecules binding to the channel's transmembrane domain typically near the inner leaflet of the plasma membrane. Phosphatidylinositol 4,5-bisphosphate (PIP_{2}) and phosphatidic acid (PA) are the best-characterized lipids to gate these channels. Many of the leak potassium channels are gated by lipids including the inward-rectifier potassium channels and two pore domain potassium channels TREK-1 and TRAAK. KCNQ potassium channel family are gated by PIP_{2}. The voltage activated potassium channel (Kv) is regulated by PA. Its midpoint of activation shifts +50 mV upon PA hydrolysis, near resting membrane potentials. This suggests Kv could be opened by lipid hydrolysis independent of voltage and may qualify this channel as dual lipid and voltage gated channel.

==== Other gating ====
Gating also includes activation and inactivation by second messengers from the inside of the cell membrane – rather than from outside the cell, as in the case for ligands.

- Some potassium channels:
  - Inward-rectifier potassium channels: These channels allow potassium ions to flow into the cell in an "inwardly rectifying" manner: potassium flows more efficiently into than out of the cell. This family is composed of 15 official and 1 unofficial member and is further subdivided into 7 subfamilies based on homology. These channels are affected by intracellular ATP, PIP_{2}, and G-protein βγ subunits. They are involved in important physiological processes such as pacemaker activity in the heart, insulin release, and potassium uptake in glial cells. They contain only two transmembrane segments, corresponding to the core pore-forming segments of the K_{V} and K_{Ca} channels. Their α subunits form tetramers.
  - Calcium-activated potassium channels: This family of channels is activated by intracellular Ca^{2+} and contains 8 members.
  - Tandem pore domain potassium channel: This family of 15 members form what are known as leak channels, and they display Goldman-Hodgkin-Katz (open) rectification. Contrary to their common name of 'Two-pore-domain potassium channels', these channels have only one pore but two pore domains per subunit.
- Two-pore channels include ligand-gated and voltage-gated cation channels, so-named because they contain two pore-forming subunits. As their name suggests, they have two pores.
- Light-gated channels like channelrhodopsin are directly opened by photons.
- Mechanosensitive ion channels open under the influence of stretch, pressure, shear, and displacement.
- Cyclic nucleotide-gated channels: This superfamily of channels contains two families: the cyclic nucleotide-gated (CNG) channels and the hyperpolarization-activated, cyclic nucleotide-gated (HCN) channels. This grouping is functional rather than evolutionary.
  - Cyclic nucleotide-gated channels: This family of channels is characterized by activation by either intracellular cAMP or cGMP. These channels are primarily permeable to monovalent cations such as K^{+} and Na^{+}. They are also permeable to Ca^{2+}, though it acts to close them. There are 6 members of this family, which is divided into 2 subfamilies.
  - Hyperpolarization-activated cyclic nucleotide-gated channels
- Temperature-gated channels: Members of the transient receptor potential ion channel superfamily, such as TRPV1 or TRPM8, are opened either by hot or cold temperatures.

=== Classification by type of ions ===
- Chloride channels: This superfamily of channels consists of approximately 13 members. They include ClCs, CLICs, Bestrophins and CFTRs. These channels are non-selective for small anions; however chloride is the most abundant anion, and hence they are known as chloride channels.
- Potassium channels
  - Voltage-gated potassium channels e.g., Kvs, Kirs etc.
  - Calcium-activated potassium channels e.g., BKCa or MaxiK, SK, etc.
  - Inward-rectifier potassium channels
  - Two-pore-domain potassium channels: This family of 15 members form what is known as leak channels, and they display Goldman-Hodgkin-Katz (open) rectification.
- Sodium channels
  - Voltage-gated sodium channels (NaVs)
  - Epithelial sodium channels (ENaCs)
- Calcium channels (CaVs)
- Phosphate channels: To date, only one phosphate channel, Xenotropic and polytropic retrovirus receptor 1 (XPR1), has been identified in animals. It is a pyrophosphate-gated channel.
- Proton channels
  - Voltage-gated proton channels
- Non-selective cation channels: These non-selectively allow many types of cations, mainly Na^{+}, K^{+} and Ca^{2+}, through the channel.
  - Most transient receptor potential channels

=== Classification by cellular localization ===
Ion channels are also classified according to their subcellular localization. The plasma membrane accounts for around 2% of the total membrane in the cell, whereas intracellular organelles contain 98% of the cell's membrane. The major intracellular compartments are endoplasmic reticulum, Golgi apparatus, and mitochondria. On the basis of localization, ion channels are classified as:

- Plasma membrane channels
  - Examples: Voltage-gated potassium channels (Kv), Sodium channels (Nav), Calcium channels (Cav, Orai) and Chloride channels (ClC)
- Intracellular channels, which are further classified into different organelles
  - Endoplasmic reticulum channels: RyR, IP3R
  - Mitochondrial channels: mPTP, KATP, BK, IK, CLIC5, Kv7.4 at the inner membrane and VDAC and CLIC4 as outer membrane channels.

=== Other classifications ===
Some ion channels are classified by the duration of their response to stimuli:

- Transient receptor potential channels: This group of channels, normally referred to simply as TRP channels, is named after their role in Drosophila visual phototransduction. This family, containing at least 28 members, is diverse in its mechanisms of activation. Some TRP channels remain constitutively open, while others are gated by voltage, intracellular Ca^{2+}, pH, redox state, osmolarity, and mechanical stretch. These channels also vary according to the ion(s) they pass, some being selective for Ca^{2+} while others are less selective cation channels. This family is subdivided into 6 subfamilies based on homology: canonical TRP (TRPC), vanilloid receptors (TRPV), melastatin (TRPM), polycystins (TRPP), mucolipins (TRPML), and ankyrin transmembrane protein 1 (TRPA).

== Detailed structure ==
Channels differ with respect to the ion they let pass (for example, Na^{+}, K^{+}, Cl^{−}), the ways in which they may be regulated, the number of subunits of which they are composed and other aspects of structure. Channels belonging to the largest class, which includes the voltage-gated channels that underlie the nerve impulse, consist of four or sometimes five subunits with six transmembrane helices each. On activation, these helices move about and open the pore. Two of these six helices are separated by a loop that lines the pore and is the primary determinant of ion selectivity and conductance in this channel class and some others.

The existence and mechanism for ion selectivity was first postulated in the late 1960s by Bertil Hille and Clay Armstrong. The idea of the ionic selectivity for potassium channels was that the carbonyl oxygens of the protein backbones of the "selectivity filter" (named by Bertil Hille) could efficiently replace the water molecules that normally shield potassium ions, but that sodium ions were smaller and cannot be completely dehydrated to allow such shielding, and therefore could not pass through. This mechanism was finally confirmed when the first structure of an ion channel was elucidated. A bacterial potassium channel KcsA, consisting of just the selectivity filter, "P" loop, and two transmembrane helices was used as a model to study the permeability and the selectivity of ion channels in the Mackinnon lab. The determination of the molecular structure of KcsA by Roderick MacKinnon using X-ray crystallography won a share of the 2003 Nobel Prize in Chemistry.

Because of their small size and the difficulty of crystallizing integral membrane proteins for X-ray analysis, it is only very recently that scientists have been able to directly examine what channels "look like." Particularly in cases where the crystallography required removing channels from their membranes with detergent, many researchers regard images that have been obtained as tentative. An example is the long-awaited crystal structure of a voltage-gated potassium channel, which was reported in May 2003. One inevitable ambiguity about these structures relates to the strong evidence that channels change conformation as they operate (they open and close, for example), such that the structure in the crystal could represent any one of these operational states. Most of what researchers have deduced about channel operation so far they have established through electrophysiology, biochemistry, gene sequence comparison and mutagenesis.

Channels can have single (CLICs) to multiple transmembrane (K channels, P2X receptors, Na channels) domains which span plasma membrane to form pores. Pore can determine the selectivity of the channel. Gate can be formed either inside or outside the pore region.

== Pharmacology ==
Chemical substances can modulate the activity of ion channels, for example by blocking or activating them.

=== Ion channel blockers ===
A variety of ion channel blockers (inorganic and organic molecules) can modulate ion channel activity and conductance. Some commonly used blockers include:

- Tetrodotoxin (TTX), used by puffer fish and some types of newts for defense. It blocks sodium channels.
- Saxitoxin is produced by a dinoflagellate also known as "red tide". It blocks voltage-dependent sodium channels.
- Conotoxin is used by cone snails to hunt prey.
- Lidocaine and novocaine belong to a class of local anesthetics which block sodium ion channels.
- Dendrotoxin is produced by mamba snakes, and blocks potassium channels.
- Iberiotoxin is produced by the Hottentotta tamulus (Eastern Indian scorpion) and blocks potassium channels.
- Heteropodatoxin is produced by Heteropoda venatoria (brown huntsman spider or laya) and blocks potassium channels.

=== Ion channel activators ===
Several compounds are known to promote the opening or activation of specific ion channels. These are classified by the channel on which they act:

- Calcium channel openers, such as Bay K8644
- Chloride channel openers, such as phenanthroline
- Potassium channel openers, such as minoxidil
- Sodium channel openers, such as DDT

== Diseases ==
There are a number of disorders which disrupt normal functioning of ion channels and have disastrous consequences for the organism. Genetic and autoimmune disorders of ion channels and their modifiers are known as channelopathies. See Category:Channelopathies for a full list.

- Shaker gene mutations cause a defect in the voltage gated ion channels, slowing down the repolarization of the cell.
- Equine hyperkalaemic periodic paralysis as well as human hyperkalaemic periodic paralysis (HyperPP) are caused by a defect in voltage-dependent sodium channels.
- Paramyotonia congenita (PC) and potassium-aggravated myotonias (PAM)
- Generalized epilepsy with febrile seizures plus (GEFS+)
- Episodic ataxia (EA), characterized by sporadic bouts of severe discoordination with or without myokymia, and can be provoked by stress, startle, or heavy exertion such as exercise.
- Familial hemiplegic migraine (FHM)
- Spinocerebellar ataxia type 13
- Long QT syndrome is a ventricular arrhythmia syndrome caused by mutations in one or more of presently ten different genes, most of which are potassium channels and all of which affect cardiac repolarization.
- Brugada syndrome is another ventricular arrhythmia caused by voltage-gated sodium channel gene mutations.
- Polymicrogyria is a developmental brain malformation caused by voltage-gated sodium channel and NMDA receptor gene mutations.
- Cystic fibrosis is caused by mutations in the CFTR gene, which is a chloride channel.
- Mucolipidosis type IV is caused by mutations in the gene encoding the TRPML1 channel
- Mutations in and overexpression of ion channels are important events in cancer cells. In Glioblastoma multiforme, upregulation of gBK potassium channels and ClC-3 chloride channels enables glioblastoma cells to migrate within the brain, which may lead to the diffuse growth patterns of these tumors.

== History ==
The fundamental properties of currents mediated by ion channels were analyzed by the British biophysicists Alan Hodgkin and Andrew Huxley as part of their Nobel Prize-winning research on the action potential, published in 1952. They built on the work of other physiologists, such as Cole and Baker's research into voltage-gated membrane pores from 1941. The existence of ion channels was confirmed in the 1970s by Bernard Katz and Ricardo Miledi using noise analysis. It was then shown more directly with an electrical recording technique known as the "patch clamp", which led to a Nobel Prize to Erwin Neher and Bert Sakmann, the technique's inventors. Hundreds if not thousands of researchers continue to pursue a more detailed understanding of how these proteins work. In recent years the development of automated patch clamp devices helped to increase significantly the throughput in ion channel screening.

The Nobel Prize in Chemistry for 2003 was awarded to Roderick MacKinnon for his studies on the physico-chemical properties of ion channel structure and function, including x-ray crystallographic structure studies.

== Culture ==
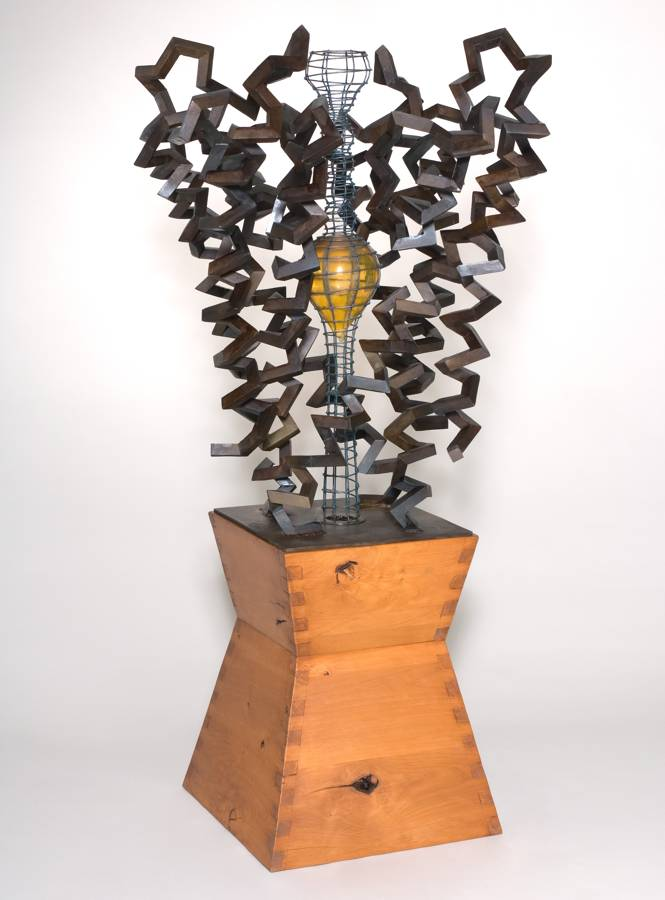
Birth of an Idea (2007) by Julian Voss-Andreae. The sculpture was commissioned by Roderick MacKinnon based on the molecule's atomic coordinates that were determined by MacKinnon's group in 2001.

Roderick MacKinnon commissioned Birth of an Idea, a 5-foot (1.5 m) tall sculpture based on the KcsA potassium channel. The artwork, by Julian Voss-Andreae, contains a wire object representing the channel's interior with a blown glass object representing the main cavity of the channel structure.

== Ion channels and stochastic processes ==
The behavior of ion channels can be usefully modeled using mathematics and probability. Stochastic processes are mathematical models of systems and phenomena that appear to vary in a random manner. A very simple example is flipping a coin; each flip has an equal chance to be heads or tails, the chances are not influenced by the outcome of past flips, and we can say that p_{heads} = 0.5 and p_{tails} = 0.5.

A particularly relevant form of stochastic processes in the study of ion channels is Markov chains. In a Markov chain, there are multiple states, each of which has given chances to transition to different states over a particular period of time. Ion channels undergo state transitions (e.g. open, closed, inactive) that behave like Markov chains. Markov chain analysis can be used to make conclusions regarding the nature of a given ion channel, including the likely number of open and closed states. We can also use Markov chain analysis to produce models that accurately simulate the insertion of ion channels into cell membranes.

Markov chains can also be used in combination with the stochastic matrix to determine the stable distribution matrix by solving the equation PX=X, where P is the stochastic matrix and X is the stable distribution matrix. This stable distribution matrix tells us the relative frequencies of each state after a long time, which in the context of ion channels can be the frequencies of the open, closed, and inactive states for an ion channel. Note that Markov chain assumptions apply, including that (1) all transition probabilities for each state sum to one, (2) the probability model applies to all possible states, and (3) that the probability of transitions are constant over time. Therefore, Markov chains have limited applicability in some situations.

There are a variety of other stochastic processes that are utilized in the study of ion channels, but are too complex to relate here and can be examined more closely elsewhere.

== See also ==
- Alpha helix
- Babycurus toxin 1
- Ion channel family as defined in Pfam and InterPro
- K_{i} Database
- Lipid bilayer ion channels
- Magnesium transport
- Neurotoxin
- Passive transport
- Synthetic ion channels
- Transmembrane receptor
