= Voltage-gated proton channel =

Ion channel that conducts protons based on voltage and pH

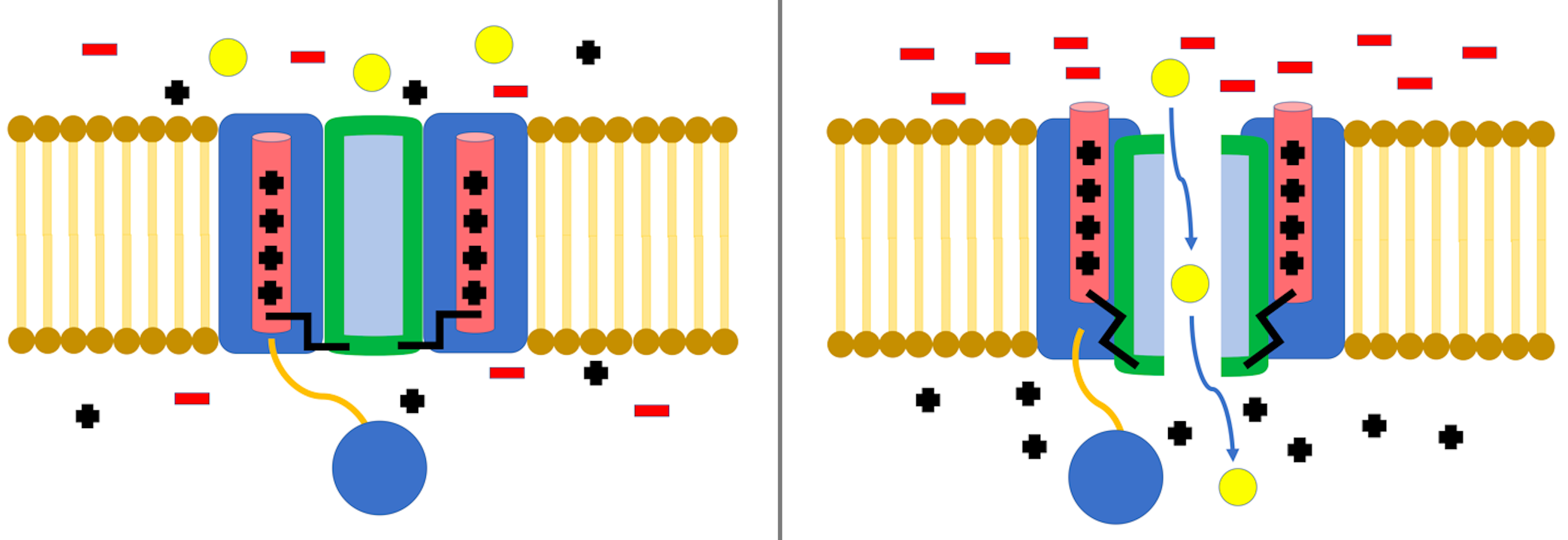
Typical voltage-gated ion channel in the closed state (left) and open state (right).

Classical voltage-gated cation channel α-subunit. S1–S4 transmembrane helices form the voltage-sensing domain and S5–S6 form the pore domain.

Voltage-gated proton channels are ion channels that conduct protons in a voltage- and pH-dependent manner. Compared to most voltage-gated cation channels, which contain a separate pore domain, these channels conduct protons through the voltage-sensing domain itself and open only when the electrochemical gradient favors outward proton flux.

In vertebrates the best-characterized voltage-gated proton channel is Hv1, encoded by the HVCN1 gene. Hv1 contributes to pH homeostasis and charge compensation in several cell types, including phagocytes, B cells, sperm, microglia, and osteoclasts. Hv-like channels are present in a wide range of eukaryotes, including many animals, protists, and plants, but have not been identified in bacteria or archaea.

== Structure ==
Voltage-gated proton channels are membrane proteins built from a voltage-sensing domain with four transmembrane helices, S1 to S4. They lack the S5–S6 pore domain that forms the central ion conduction pathway in most voltage-gated potassium and sodium channels, so proton permeation occurs within the voltage-sensing domain itself.

Topology of an Hv-type voltage-gated proton channel subunit with the fewer four transmembrane helices (S1–S4).

The human Hv1 protein is a dimer of two identical subunits. Each subunit contains its own voltage-sensing domain and forms an independent proton conduction pathway, so a dimer has two functional pores. The C-terminal cytosolic regions of the subunits form a coiled-coil, which stabilizes the dimer and supports cooperative gating between the two subunits.

Structural work and simulations indicate that proton permeation occurs along a chain of water molecules and titratable side chains within the voltage-sensing domain. A conserved aspartate in S1 (Asp112 in human Hv1) acts as the main selectivity site for protons. Neutralization or charge reversal at this position disrupts proton selectivity and allows other small cations, including guanidinium, to pass through. The hydrogen-bond network around this aspartate and nearby basic residues in S4 is important for maintaining proton selectivity.

== Voltage and pH-dependent gating ==
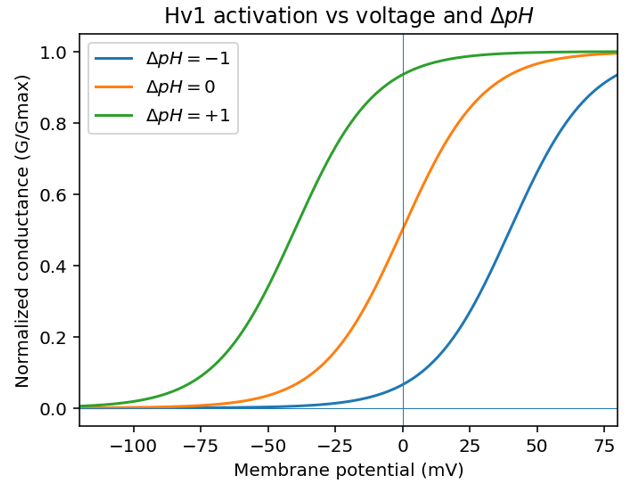
Idealized conductance–voltage (G/G_{max}) curves for Hv1 at different transmembrane pH gradients (ΔpH). The activation curve shifts by about 40 mV per pH unit, so the channel opens only under conditions that favor outward proton flux.

Voltage-gated proton channels are activated by membrane depolarization, but their gating is strongly influenced by the transmembrane pH gradient. The voltage-dependence of Hv1 activation shifts by roughly 40 millivolts for each unit change in the pH difference across the membrane, so the activation curve follows the reversal potential for protons. Under physiological conditions, these channels open only when the electrochemical gradient drives protons out of the cell, and macroscopic currents are almost exclusively outward.

Because of this coupling to the pH gradient, Hv1 tends to oppose sustained depolarization during proton efflux and to support cytosolic pH regulation, rather than generating large, fast depolarizing currents. The estimated flux through a single Hv1 channel is on the order of 100,000 protons per second under typical conditions, which is small compared with many other ion channels but is sufficient for long-lasting metabolic loads.

The molecular basis of the pH dependence involves protonation of residues that are accessible from the intracellular and extracellular solutions. Changes in pH shift the equilibrium of voltage-sensor movements in S4 and thereby shift the voltage range over which the channel opens. Proton-conducting "gating-pore" currents that appear in some mutant voltage-gated sodium channels are often used as an analogy for the conduction pathway in Hv1.

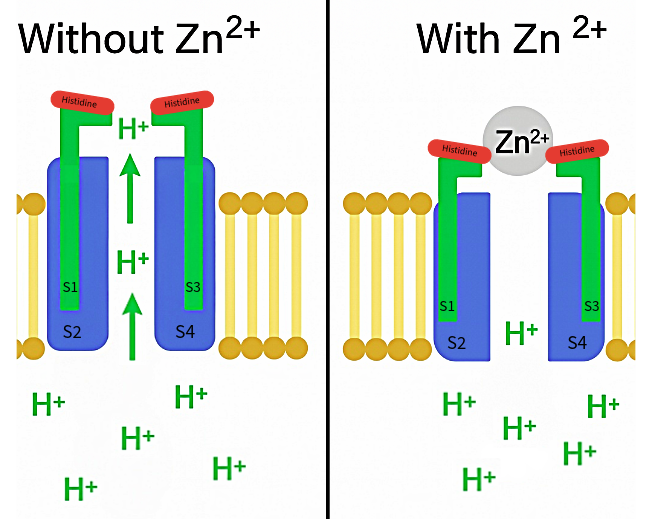
Zn²⁺ cation binding to Hv1 in the extracellular side by S1 and S3 subunits coordinated by histidines (Right) vs. a Hv1 without Zn²⁺ cation (Left).

=== Inhibition ===
External zinc ions are potent inhibitors of Hv1. Micromolar concentrations of zinc applied to the extracellular side shift activation to more positive voltages and reduce current amplitude. Histidines in the extracellular parts of S1 and S3, along with residues at the dimer interface, contribute to high-affinity zinc binding. In electrophysiological recordings, reversible zinc block is a common criterion for identifying Hv currents.

Several small-molecule Hv1 inhibitors have been developed and tested in cells and in animal models. These compounds are used as experimental tools and are being evaluated as potential anti-inflammatory or anticancer agents, but they are not in clinical use as approved drugs.

== Distribution and evolution ==
Comparative genomics indicates that Hv-like channels are widespread in eukaryotes but have not been detected in bacteria or archaea.Vertebrates typically possess a single Hv gene, HVCN1, while several invertebrate and unicellular lineages have multiple paralogues. Many commonly used invertebrate models, including Drosophila melanogaster and Caenorhabditis elegans, do not appear to have Hv genes.

In some molluscs and other marine invertebrates, the Hv gene family is expanded, with several Hv channels expressed within a single species. Hv channels have also been identified in dinoflagellates, where they support large proton currents in marine protists.

Hv1 orthologues are present in land plants. In Arabidopsis thaliana, Hv1 contributes to pH regulation in pollen and other cells. In angiosperms, heterologous expression studies suggest that Hv channels often require prior mechanical perturbation of the membrane for robust voltage-dependent activation, whereas Hv channels from non-flowering plants tested so far do not show this requirement.

== Physiological roles ==
=== Phagocytes and innate immunity ===
Hv1 is expressed in phagocytes such as neutrophils, eosinophils, and macrophages. During the respiratory burst, the NADPH oxidase complex transfers electrons across the plasma or phagosomal membrane to generate superoxide and other reactive oxygen species. This electron flux depolarizes the membrane and acidifies the cytosol.

Hv1 provides charge compensation and proton extrusion during the respiratory burst. In cells lacking Hv1 or in the presence of zinc, superoxide production is markedly reduced, whereas phagocytosis itself is largely preserved. By exporting protons, Hv1 helps maintain cytosolic pH within a workable range for enzyme activity and prevents excessive depolarization that would otherwise slow or stop the oxidase.

Hv1-dependent functions in phagocytes have been described in mammals and in zebrafish neutrophils, which indicates that this role is conserved across vertebrates.

=== B cells and other immune cells ===
Hv1 is expressed in B lymphocytes, where it supports antigen receptor signaling. In mouse models, loss of HVCN1 reduces B cell receptor–dependent reactive oxygen species production and attenuates downstream signaling events. Hv1 has also been implicated in T cell lines and other leukocytes, where pharmacological inhibition can shift intracellular pH and promote apoptosis in some malignant cells.

=== Nervous system and microglia ===
Hv1 is present in microglia and other cells of the nervous system. Microglial Hv1 contributes to reactive oxygen species production during inflammatory activation and has been implicated in neuronal injury after ischemia and spinal cord trauma. In mouse models, genetic deletion or pharmacological inhibition of Hv1 reduces microglial reactive oxygen species production and can lessen tissue damage in several central nervous system injury paradigms.

=== Sperm ===
Human Hv1 is localized along the principal piece of the sperm flagellum together with the calcium channel CatSper. When sperm move from the acidic environment of semen and the epididymis into the more alkaline female reproductive tract, Hv1 opens in response to the change in pH and membrane potential. Proton efflux through Hv1 raises intracellular pH, which in turn facilitates CatSper activation and calcium influx.

Block of Hv1 in human sperm reduces intracellular alkalinization, decreases calcium entry through CatSper, and impairs hyperactivated motility and the acrosome reaction in vitro. These findings support a role for Hv1 in human fertilization.

=== Osteoclasts and other tissues ===
Hv1 is expressed in osteoclasts, where it contributes to the export of protons into the resorption lacuna together with vacuolar proton pumps. Hv1 carries a smaller fraction of the total proton flux than the pumps but can facilitate acidification under some conditions

Hv1 currents have been recorded or inferred in several other cell types that experience sustained proton loads, including airway epithelial cells, certain neurons, and some tumor cells. In these settings, Hv1 generally supports pH homeostasis during prolonged metabolic activity.

=== Cancer and pathophysiology ===
Hv1 is upregulated in several human cancers. In breast cancer, Hv1 expression is elevated in highly metastatic cell lines and in metastatic tumor tissues compared with non-metastatic samples. Reducing Hv1 expression in these models decreases tumor growth, extracellular acidification, and metastasis. In colorectal cancer, Hv1 is overexpressed in primary tumors and is associated with poorer prognosis. Hv1 has also been studied as a potential drug target in conditions where sustained proton efflux, acidic microenvironments, and reactive oxygen species signaling are involved, including cancer and inflammatory conditions

Proposed mechanisms include support of glycolytic metabolism by maintaining intracellular pH, enhancement of extracellular acidification, and modulation of reactive oxygen species signaling that affects migration and invasion. Hv1 is therefore being investigated as a potential biomarker and therapeutic target in oncology, although no Hv1-targeted drugs have yet progressed to clinical approval.

Outside of cancer, altered Hv1 activity has been linked to inflammatory and ischemic conditions, particularly in the central nervous system, where Hv1-dependent microglial reactive oxygen species contribute to neuronal injury in several experimental models.
