= TRPA (ion channel) =

Family of transport proteins

transient receptor potential cation channel, subfamily A, member 1

Identifiers
- Symbol: TRPA1
- Alt. symbols: ANKTM1
- IUPHAR: 485
- NCBI gene: 8989
- HGNC: 497
- OMIM: 604775
- RefSeq: NM_007332
- UniProt: O75762

Other data
- Locus: Chr. 8 q13
Search for
- Structures: Swiss-model
- Domains: InterPro

TRPA subfamilies.

TRPA is a family of transient receptor potential ion channels. The TRPA family is made up of 7 subfamilies: TRPA1, TRPA- or TRPA1-like, TRPA5, painless, pyrexia, waterwitch, and HsTRPA. TRPA1 is the only subfamily widely expressed across animals, while the other subfamilies (collectively referred to as the basal clade) are largely absent in deuterostomes (and in the case of HsTRPA, only expressed in hymenopteran insects).

TRPA1s have been the most extensively studied subfamily; they typically contain 14 N-terminal ankyrin repeats and are believed to function as mechanical stress, temperature, and chemical sensors. TRPA1 is known to be activated by compounds such as isothiocyanate (which are the pungent chemicals in substances such as mustard oil and wasabi) and Michael acceptors (e.g. cinnamaldehyde). These compounds are capable of forming covalent chemical bonds with the protein's cysteins. Non-covalent activators of TRPA1 also exists, such as methyl salicylate, menthol, and the synthetic compound PF-4840154. A TRPA1-like channel from the flatworm parasite Schistosoma mansoni, which does not appear to have genes for TRPV channels, exhibits pharmacological sensitivities to both TRPV1 (capsaicin) and TRPA1 (isothiocyanate) activators.

The thermal sensitivity of TRPAs varies by species. For example, TRPA1 functions as a high-temperature sensor in insects and snakes, but as a cold sensor in mammals. The basal TRPAs have evolved some degree of thermal sensitivity as well: painless and pyrexia function in high-temperature sensing in Drosophila melanogaster, and the honey bee HsTRPA underwent neofunctionalization following its divergence from waterwitch, gaining function as a high-temperature sensor.

TRPA1s promiscuity with respect to sensory modality has been the source of controversy, particularly when considering its ability to detect cold. More recent work has alternatively (or additionally) proposed that reactive oxygen species activate TRPA1, across species.
