= Bay K8644 =

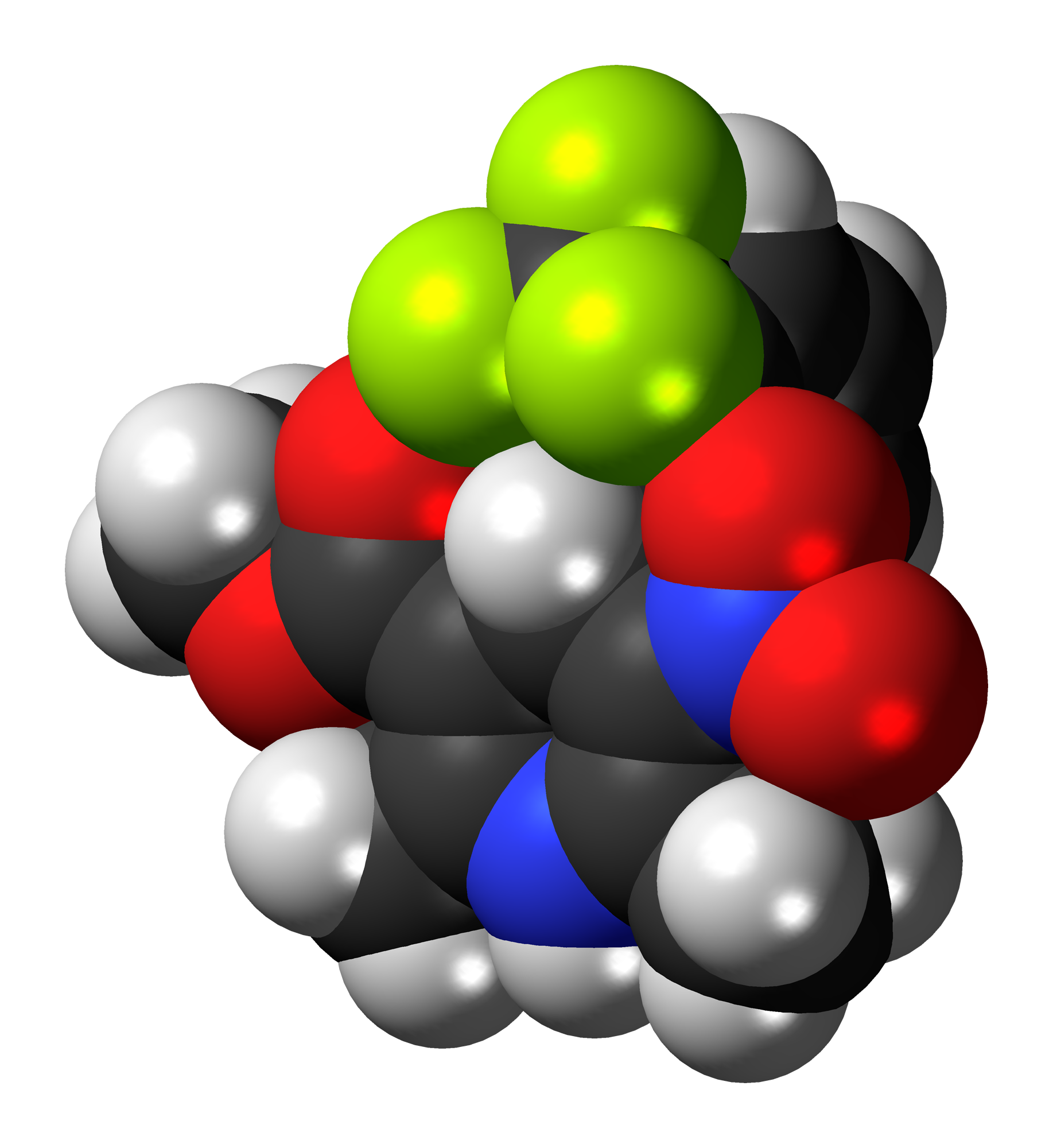

Names
- Preferred IUPAC name Methyl 2,6-dimethyl-5-nitro-4-[2-(trifluoromethyl)phenyl]-1,4-dihydropyridine-3-carboxylate

Identifiers
CAS Number	71145-03-4
3D model (JSmol)	Interactive image
ChEBI	CHEBI:34555
ChEMBL	ChEMBL1082832
ChemSpider	2213
ECHA InfoCard	100.163.930
EC Number	636-102-2
IUPHAR/BPS	2511
PubChem CID	2303
CompTox Dashboard (EPA)	DTXSID301017346 DTXSID00913080, DTXSID301017346
- InChI: InChI=1S/C16H15F3N2O4/c1-8-12(15(22)25-3)13(14(21(23)24)9(2)20-8)10-6-4-5-7-11(10)16(17,18)19/h4-7,13,20H,1-3H3 Key: ZFLWDHHVRRZMEI-UHFFFAOYSA-N; InChI=1/C16H15F3N2O4/c1-8-12(15(22)25-3)13(14(21(23)24)9(2)20-8)10-6-4-5-7-11(10)16(17,18)19/h4-7,13,20H,1-3H3 Key: ZFLWDHHVRRZMEI-UHFFFAOYAV
- SMILES: CC1=C(C(C(=C(N1)C)[N+](=O)[O-])C2=CC=CC=C2C(F)(F)F)C(=O)OC

Properties
Chemical formula	C_{16}H_{15}F_{3}N_{2}O_{4}
Molar mass	356.301 g·mol^{−1}
Solubility in water	Insoluble
Solubility in other solvents	DMSO: 184 mg/mL; methanol and ethanol: 63 mg/mL

Hazards
- GHS labelling
Pictograms	(GHS07: Exclamation mark)
Signal word	Warning
Hazard statements	H315, H319
Precautionary statements	P264, P280, P302+P352, P305+P351+P338, P321, P332+P313, P337+P313, P362
- Except where otherwise noted, data are given for materials in their standard state (at 25 °C [77 °F], 100 kPa). verify (what is ?) Infobox references

Bay K8644 is a chemical compound that functions as an L-type calcium channel agonist. Bay K8644 is used primarily as a biochemical research tool for this effect. It is a structural analog of nifedipine with positive inotropic activity, and as an aromatic it is highly lipid soluble.

== Mechanism of action ==
Bay K8644 targets L-type voltage-gated calcium channels. It is the first positive inotropic agent shown to act specifically and directly on calcium channels.
