= Babycurus toxin 1 =

Babycurus-toxin 1 (BcTx1) is a component of the venom of the east African scorpion Babycurus centrurimorphus. This toxin modifies both the activation and the inactivation properties of insect sodium channels.

== Sources ==
This toxin is a component of the venom secreted by the east African scorpion Babycurus centrurimorphus of the scorpion family Buthidae, and is more specific in envenoming insects, for example the cockroach, than in human envenoming.

== Chemistry ==
The molecular weight of BcTx1 is 3248. It belongs to the long (4 C-C) scorpion toxin superfamily and can be classified as a β-toxin. Only the first 30 amino acids of the BcTx1 protein have yet been sequenced.

The toxin shares similarities in protein structure with other toxins found in scorpions in North Africa and the Middle East, including the genera Buthus and Centruroides.

== Target ==
The toxin acts affects sodium channel properties. The toxin can bind to many different sodium channels, including mammalian channels, although the effects on non-insect sodium channels have not yet been tested.

== Mode of action ==
BcTx1 acts on insect axonal sodium channels by lowering their activation threshold (by 5-10 mV), resulting in an increase of Na+ conductances. It also shifts the steady-state inactivation curve in the negative direction (by ~15 mV). In addition, BcTx1 slows down the activation of sodium channels. As a result of its action on the sodium channels, neurons depolarize and can no longer fire action potentials, leading to a flaccid paralysis.
