= Fox Chase Cancer Center =

Cancer treatment and research institution in the US

- Temple University Health System

Geography
- Location: 333 Cottman Avenue, Philadelphia, Pennsylvania, United States
- Coordinates: 40.071848°N 75.090206°W

Organization
- Type: Specialist
- Affiliated university: Temple University School of Medicine, Temple University

Services
- Standards: NCI-designated Comprehensive Cancer Center
- Speciality: Oncology, Teaching hospital, Cancer research

History
- Former names: American Oncologic Hospital, Institute for Cancer Research
- Founded: 1904; 122 years ago (as the American Oncologic Hospital)

Links
- Website: www.foxchase.org
- Lists: Hospitals in Pennsylvania

Fox Chase Cancer Center is a National Cancer Institute-designated Comprehensive Cancer Center research facility and hospital located in the Fox Chase section of Philadelphia, Pennsylvania, United States. The main facilities of the center are located on property adjoining Burholme Park. The center is part of the Temple University Health System (TUHS) and specializes in the treatment and prevention of cancer.

== History ==
The center was formed in 1974 by the merger of the American Oncologic Hospital, which was founded in 1904 as the first cancer hospital in the United States, and the Institute for Cancer Research, founded in 1927.

In 1967 a large wing of the hospital was constructed based on a design by Vincent G. Kling using steep slopes of poured concrete and roof tiles by Ludowici.

In 1995, Fox Chase also became a founding member of the National Comprehensive Cancer Network, an alliance of 21 of the nation's leading academic cancer centers.

The center was an independent, non-profit institution until it became part of TUHS on July 1, 2012. On December 15, 2011, Fox Chase Cancer Center and Temple University Health system signed an affiliation agreement. Under the agreement, Fox Chase has connected and extended its current operations into the adjoining 176-bed and 33-acre Jeanes Hospital, which is already a part of the Temple University Health System. Fox Chase is considered the "Cancer Hub" of the Temple University Health System.

The center has more than 2,400 employees and an operating budget of $300 million. Revenue has steadily increased from $509 million in 2019 to $817 million in 2024, with fiscal year 2025 closing in on nearly $1 billion. In fiscal year 2024, annual hospital admissions were nearly 3,500 and outpatient visits to physicians were nearly 144,000. In fiscal year 2025, more than 18,500 new patients were seen at Fox Chase, and the number of patients has increased by more than 110% over the last 4 years. According to the Pennsylvania Health Care Containment Council, Fox Chase ranked second in inpatient surgical cancer cases in the state despite having fewer inpatient beds, operating rooms, and intensive care unit beds than larger centers.

Fox Chase Cancer Center has earned national rankings of 33 in cancer and 19 in urology among the country’s top 50 hospitals in the 2024-2025 Best Hospitals rankings from U.S. News & World Report, which puts these programs in the top 4% nationally.

=== Research advances and awards ===
- 2026 Roland Dunbrack receives the DeLano Award for Computational Biosciences from the American Society for Biochemistry and Molecular Biology (ASBMB)
- 2023 American Nurses Association Magnet Award for Nursing Excellence. Fox Chase Cancer Center is one of 15 hospitals to receive the award six or more times.
- 2020 the Press Ganey's Guardian of Excellence Award for excellence in clinical care in outpatient services.
- 2018 Anna Marie Skalka is awarded the William Procter Prize for Scientific Achievement, given to scientists who have made an outstanding contribution to scientific research and demonstrated an ability to communicate this research to scientists in other disciplines
- 2011 The 6th Szent-Györgyi Prize for Progress in Cancer Research was awarded to Beatrice Mintz by the National Foundation for Cancer Research for her discoveries of the relationship between development and cancer, based on construction and analysis of chimeric and transgenic mouse models.
- 2004 The Kyoto Prize in Basic Science is awarded to Alfred G. Knudson for lifetime achievement and contributions to the betterment of mankind.
- 2004 The Nobel Prize in Chemistry is awarded to Irwin Rose and his colleagues Aaron Ciechanover and Avram Hershko for their discovery of ubiquitin-mediated protein degradation.
- 2000 Fox Chase became the first US cancer center and the first hospital in Pennsylvania to earn the American Nurses Association Magnet Award for Nursing Excellence .
- 1993 Beatrice Mintz produces the first mouse model of human melanoma, in which the disease resembles the human malignancy.
- 1991 Philip Tsichlis, Alfonso Bellacosa, and Joseph Testa clone the AKT1 and AKT2 genes - the first viral oncogenes described that inhibit programmed cell death.
- 1991 Timothy Yen discovers that a molecular motor controls the way human cells sort their chromosomes when cells divide during mitosis.
- 1982 William Mason and Jesse Summers demonstrate that the hepatitis B virus utilizes reverse transcription for genome replication, previously thought to be unique to retroviruses.
- 1981 Beatrice Mintz's laboratory is one of the first to introduce a cloned gene into fertilized mouse eggs and prove that it is retained in animals developing from those eggs, and is transmitted to their progeny.
- 1980 Discovery of critical aspects of ubiquitin-dependent protein degradation by Avram Hershko and Irwin Rose.
- 1980 Alfred G. Knudson develops the "two-hit" hypothesis, predicting the existence and behavior of tumor suppressor genes.
- 1980 Discovery of the SCID mouse, a mouse strain with no natural immunity, by Melvin Bosma. The SCID mouse is an essential research tool in devising new treatments.
- 1979 Beatrice Mintz shows that a fatal genetic anemia of mice can be prevented in utero by injecting normal blood-forming stem cells into the fetus through a placental blood vessel.
- 1976 The Nobel Prize in Physiology or Medicine is awarded to Baruch Blumberg for his discovery of the Hepatitis B virus and development of the HBV vaccine, the first "anti-cancer vaccine", which has reduced the incidence of liver cancer.
- 1975 The first transgenic mammals containing foreign DNA are produced by Beatrice Mintz and Rudolf Jaenisch.
- 1974 Discovery by Robert P. Perry that the messenger RNAs of mammalian cells and their precursors contain a novel structure at their leading ends.
- 1972 Helen M. Berman and Jenny Glusker report the crystal structure of a nucleic acid-drug complex as a model for anti-tumor agent and mutagen action.
- 1968 Development of the first Hepatitis B vaccine by Baruch Blumberg and Irving Millman.
- 1967 Discovery of the Hepatitis B virus and development of the blood test for Hepatitis B by Baruch Blumberg.
- 1962 The first demonstration, by Robert P. Perry, that ribosomal RNA is synthesized in the nucleolus as a large precursor molecule that is subsequently processed into mature components.
- 1962 Beatrice Mintz's development of the first mammal comprising two genetically different cell populations in all tissues, as a tool for analyses of embryonic development and disease in mouse models.
- 1960 Discovery of the Philadelphia chromosome, the first genetic abnormality associated with a human cancer, by David Hungerford of the Fox Chase Cancer Center and Peter Nowell of the University of Pennsylvania.
- 1952 First nuclear transplantation (or 'cloning') experiment is performed by Robert Briggs and Thomas King using eggs of the frog Rana pipiens.
- 1946 Mary Bennett identifies an essential nutrient later revealed to be Vitamin B12.

== Notable current and former researchers ==
- Manfred Bayer, electron microscopist who obtained the earliest images of hepatitis B virus
- Helen M. Berman, former director of the Protein Data Bank
- Baruch Blumberg, (d. 5 April 2011) awarded the Nobel Prize in Physiology or Medicine in 1976 for discovery of Hepatitis B and the Hepatitis B vaccine
- Robert Briggs, pioneer in cloning by embryonic nuclear transfer
- Barbara Burtness, oncologist at Yale
- Edna Cukierman, scientist studying the tumor microenvironment in pancreatic cancer
- Marie A. DiBerardino, pioneer in amphibian cloning
- Wafik El-Deiry, discoverer of WAF1
- Jenny Pickworth Glusker, noted crystallographer
- Karen Glanz, American behavioral epidemiologist at the University of Pennsylvania
- Erica Golemis, scientist studying cancer signaling pathways
- David Hungerford, co-discoverer of the Philadelphia chromosome
- V. Craig Jordan, "Father of Tamoxifen"
- Alfred G. Knudson, architect of the "two-hit hypothesis" (Knudson hypothesis) about the role of accumulated genetic errors in cancer development, awarded the Kyoto Prize in 2004 and the Albert Lasker Award in 1998
- Cecily Littleton, Scottish X-ray crystallographer and horticulturalist
- H. Paul Meloche (1929 – 1999), research biochemist who specialized in the field of enzyme stereochemistry
- Irving Millman (d. 17 April 2012), who helped Baruch Blumberg develop the first hepatitis B vaccine
- Beatrice Mintz, pioneering cancer researcher, noted for many embryonic and genetic advances, and member of the National Academy of Sciences and of the Pontifical Academy of Sciences
- Maureen Murphy, cancer biologist at Wistar Institute
- Arthur Lindo Patterson, who developed the Patterson function, a key step in determining the structures of molecules using X-ray crystallography
- Robert P. Perry, biophysicist and molecular biologist, who studied RNA synthesis, processing, and regulation
- Irwin Rose, awarded Nobel Prize in Chemistry in 2004 for the discovery of ubiquitin-mediated protein degradation
- Harry Rozmiarek, noted veterinarian, academic, and laboratory animal care specialist.
- Alton Sutnick, noted for the early clinical work that led to the identification of the Hepatitis B virus
- Shirley M. Tilghman, president of Princeton University from 2001 to 2013
- Donald Weeks
- Tim J. Yen, former professor

== See also ==
- MolIDE
- ProtCID
