= Marie A. DiBerardino =

American biologist

Marie A. DiBerardino (or Di Berardino) (May 2, 1926 – July 14, 2013, Haverford, Pennsylvania) was an American biologist, specializing in developmental biology and genetics. She is known, with Robert William Briggs and Thomas Joseph King, as a pioneer in amphibian cloning.

== Education and career ==
After graduating from West Philadelphia Catholic Girls High School in 1944, Marie DiBerardino matriculated at Chestnut Hill College, graduating there in 1948 with a B.S. in biology. During the 1950s she was a staff member at the Women's Medical College of Pennsylvania. She became a professor of anatomy at the Women's Medical College of Pennsylvania (which was renamed in 1970 the Medical College of Pennsylvania, merged in 1993 into the Hahnemann Medical School, and absorbed in 2003 into the Drexel University College of Medicine).

She graduated in 1962 from the University of Pennsylvania with a Ph.D. in development and genetics. She became a professor of physiology and biochemistry at the Medical College of Pennsylvania and in retirement was professor emerita of the Drexel University College of Medicine. For many years she did research at Philadelphia's Institute for Cancer Research (which in 1974 was merged into the Fox Chase Cancer Center).

In 1967 DiBerardino and Thomas J. King published the important result that

(N)uclear transplantation from gastrulae and later stages often resulted in chromosome damage, whereas nuclei from blastula cells were damaged a great deal less. This, in turn, can be attributed to the slowing cell cycle as cells differentiate and to other changes undergone as cells progress toward a specialized state.

DiBerardino was elected in 1976 a Fellow of the American Association for the Advancement of Science. She received the Jean Brachet Memorial Award of the International Society of Developmental Biology (now called the International Society of Differentiation) and gave the 1996 Jean Brachet Memorial Lecture.

She was the co-editor, with Laurence D. Etkin, of Genomic Adaptability in Somatic Cell Specialization

She served on numerous editorial boards, lectured at numerous symposia in the USA, Canada, England, France, Italy, Germany, and Japan and was a member of the Board of Trustees of the Society for Development Biology, the International Society of Developmental Biology, the Board of Corporators of the Medical College of Pennsylvania.

== Selected publications ==
- Di Berardino, Marie A. (1961). "Investigations of the germ-plasm in relation to nuclear transplantation". Development. 9 (3): 507–513. doi:10.1242/dev.9.3.507.
- Di Berardino, Marie A. (1962). "The karyotype of Rana pipiens and investigation of its stability during embryonic differentiation". Developmental Biology. 5 (1): 101–126. doi:10.1016/0012-1606(62)90006-4. ISSN 0012-1606.
- Di Berardino, Marie A.; Hoffner, Nancy (1970). "Origin of chromosomal abnormalities in nuclear transplants—A reevaluation of nuclear differentiation and nuclear equivalence in amphibians". Developmental Biology. 23 (2): 185–209. doi:10.1016/0012-1606(70)90094-1. ISSN 0012-1606. PMID 4920402.
- Hoffner, Nancy J.; Diberardino, Marie A. (1977). "The acquisition of egg cytoplasmic non-histone proteins by nuclei during nuclear reprogramming". Experimental Cell Research. 108 (2): 421–427. doi:10.1016/S0014-4827(77)80049-9. PMID 302214.
- Hoffner, N.; Diberardino, M. (1980). "Developmental potential of somatic nuclei transplanted into meiotic oocytes of Rana pipiens". Science. 209 (4455): 517–519. Bibcode:1980Sci...209..517H. doi:10.1126/science.6967227. PMID 6967227.
- Diberardino, Marie A. (1980). "Genetic Stability and Modulation of Metazoan Nuclei Transplanted into Eggs and Oocytes". Differentiation. 17 (1–3): 17–30. doi:10.1111/j.1432-0436.1980.tb01078.x. PMID 6997128.
- Leonard, Ronald A.; Hoffner, Nancy J.; Diberardino, Marie A. (1982). "Induction of DNA synthesis in amphibian erythroid nuclei in Rana eggs following conditioning in meiotic oocytes". Developmental Biology. 92 (2): 343–355. doi:10.1016/0012-1606(82)90180-4. PMID 6981533.
- Diberardino, M.; Hoffner, N. (1983). "Gene reactivation in erythrocytes: Nuclear transplantation in oocytes and eggs of Rana". Science. 219 (4586): 862–864. Bibcode:1983Sci...219..862D. doi:10.1126/science.6600520. PMID 6600520.
- Diberardino, M.; Hoffner, N.; Etkin, L. (1984). "Activation of dormant genes in specialized cells". Science. 224 (4652): 946–952. Bibcode:1984Sci...224..946D. doi:10.1126/science.6719127. PMID 6719127.
- Orr, N. H.; Diberardino, M. A.; McKinnell, R. G. (1986). "The genome of frog erythrocytes displays centuplicate replications". Proceedings of the National Academy of Sciences. 83 (5): 1369–1373. Bibcode:1986PNAS...83.1369O. doi:10.1073/pnas.83.5.1369. PMC 323077. PMID 3485285.
- Diberardino, M. A.; Orr, N. H.; McKinnell, R. G. (1986). "Feeding tadpoles cloned from Rana erythrocyte nuclei". Proceedings of the National Academy of Sciences. 83 (21): 8231–8234. Bibcode:1986PNAS...83.8231D. doi:10.1073/pnas.83.21.8231. PMC 386901. PMID 3490665.
- Diberardino, Marie A. (1987). "Genomic Potential of Differentiated Cells Analyzed by Nuclear Transplantation". American Zoologist. 27 (2): 623–644. doi:10.1093/icb/27.2.623.
- Diberardino, Marie A. (1988). "Genomic multipotentiality of differentiated somatic cells". Cell Differentiation and Development. 25: 129–136. doi:10.1016/0922-3371(88)90109-8. PMID 3061587.
- Di Berardino, M. A.; McKinnell, R. G. (1997). "Backward compatible". The Sciences. 37 (5): 32–37. doi:10.1002/j.2326-1951.1997.tb03339.x.
- McKinnell, Robert G.; Di Berardino, Marie A. (1999). "The Biology of Cloning: History and Rationale". BioScience. 49 (11): 875–885. doi:10.2307/1313647. ISSN 1525-3244. JSTOR 1313647.
- Di Berardino, Marie A. (2001). "Animal Cloning – the route to new genomics in agriculture and medicine". Differentiation. 68 (2–3): 67–83. doi:10.1046/j.1432-0436.2001.680201.x. ISSN 0301-4681. PMID 11686237.
- Di Berardino, Marie A. (2002). "Ban Human Cloning". Differentiation. 69 (4–5): 147–149. doi:10.1046/j.1432-0436.2002.690402.x. ISSN 0301-4681. PMID 11841467.
- DiBerardino, Marie A. (2002). "Cloning: Past, Present, and the Exciting Future" (PDF). Federation of American Societies for Experimental Biology (FASEB).
- Di Berardino, Marie A.; McKinnell, Robert G.; Wolf, Don P. (2003). "The golden anniversary of cloning: a celebratory essay". Differentiation. 71 (7): 398–401. doi:10.1046/j.1432-0436.2003.7107002.x. ISSN 0301-4681. PMID 12969332.
- King, Thomas J.; Diberardino, Marie A. (2006). "Transplantation of Nuclei from the Frog Renal Adenocarcinoma I. Development of Tumor Nuclear-Transplant Embryos". Annals of the New York Academy of Sciences. 126 (1): 115–126. doi:10.1111/j.1749-6632.1965.tb14271.x. PMID 5220155. S2CID 37551660.
- Di Berardino M.A. (2006). "Origin and Progress of Nuclear Transfer in Nonmammalian Animals". In Verma P.J.; Trounson A.O. (eds.). Nuclear Transfer Protocols. Methods in Molecular Biology. Vol. 348. Humana Press. pp. 3–31. doi:10.1007/978-1-59745-154-3_1. ISBN 978-1-58829-280-3. PMID 16988369.
