= H. Paul Meloche =

American biochemist

Dr. Henry Paul Meloche (November 1929 – August 1999) was a research biochemist who specialized in the field of enzyme stereochemistry. He earned a bachelor's degree from the University of Detroit and graduated from Michigan State University in 1956 with a Masters and PhD in Chemistry. He was a researcher at the Fox Chase Cancer Center in Philadelphia, where he worked alongside Nobel Prize–winning scientists Irwin Rose, and Baruch S. Blumberg. He was also a researcher at the Papanicolaou Cancer Research Institute in Miami.

In his career, he published 52 peer-reviewed articles, according to Web of Science. The most cited was

- Meloche HP. "Bromopyruvate inactivation of 2-keto-3-deoxy-phosphogluconic aldolase. I. Kinetic Evidence for Active Site specificity" in Biochemistry 6 (8): 2273 1967, cited 211 times
