= Animal testing on frogs =

Overview article

Frogs have been used in animal tests throughout the history of biomedical science.

Eighteenth-century biologist Luigi Galvani discovered the link between electricity and the nervous system through studying frogs.

== Pregnancy testing ==
The African clawed frog or platanna, Xenopus laevis, was first widely used in laboratories in pregnancy assays in the first half of the 20th century. When human chorionic gonadotropin, a hormone found in substantial quantities in the urine of pregnant women, is injected into a female X. laevis, it induces them to lay eggs. In 1952 Robert William Briggs and Thomas Joseph King cloned a frog by somatic cell nuclear transfer, the same technique that was later used to create Dolly the Sheep, their experiment was the first time successful nuclear transplantation had been accomplished in metazoans.

An unexpected consequence of the use of Xenopus laevis for pregnancy tests was apparently the widespread release of a serious amphibian disease. X. laevis carries a chytrid fungus known as Batrachochytrium dendrobatidis, native to South Africa. X. laevis itself does not show symptoms from carrying this fungus, but the fungus is deadly to many amphibians outside South Africa. Xenopus laevis frogs were exported around the world in large quantities beginning in the 1930s for use in the pregnancy test. Within a few decades, escaped populations of X. laevis were living in many countries of the world, and in the 1970s, many amphibian biologists began noting mysterious declines in frog populations in South America, Central America and Australia, the declines spreading in a pattern that suggested an infectious disease. The disease has since been identified as chytridiomycosis. It has caused several species extinctions and is thought to be a major cause of the worldwide decline in amphibian populations. The chytrid fungus has recently reached North America. In 2004, Weldon et al. identified Xenopus laevis and the pregnancy test as the likely source of this worldwide calamity.

Frogs are used in cloning research and other branches of embryology because frogs are among the closest living relatives of man to lack egg shells characteristic of most other vertebrates, and therefore facilitate observations of early development. Although alternative pregnancy assays have been developed, biologists continue to use Xenopus as a model organism in developmental biology because it is easy to raise in captivity and has a large and easily manipulated embryo. Recently, X. laevis is increasingly being displaced by its smaller relative Xenopus tropicalis, which reaches its reproductive age in five months rather than one to two years (as in X. laevis), facilitating faster studies across generations. The genome sequence of X. tropicalis was scheduled to be completed by 2015 at the latest.

== Dissection ==
Frogs are widely used in classroom dissections and teaching exercises.
