= Chromosome instability =

Type of genomic instability

Chromosomal instability (CIN) is a type of genomic instability in which chromosomes are unstable, such that either whole chromosomes or parts of chromosomes are duplicated or deleted. More specifically, CIN refers to the increase in rate of addition or loss of entire chromosomes or sections of them. The unequal distribution of DNA to daughter cells upon mitosis results in a failure to maintain euploidy (the correct number of chromosomes) leading to aneuploidy (incorrect number of chromosomes). In other words, the daughter cells do not have the same number of chromosomes as the cell they originated from. Chromosomal instability is the most common form of genetic instability and cause of aneuploidy.

These changes have been studied in solid tumors (a tumor that usually doesn't contain liquid, pus, or air, compared to liquid tumor), which may or may not be cancerous. CIN is a common occurrence in solid and haematological cancers, especially colorectal cancer. Although many tumours show chromosomal abnormalities, CIN is characterised by an increased rate of these errors.

== Criteria for CIN definition ==
- As chromosome instability refers to the rate that chromosomes or large portions of chromosomes are changed, there should be comparisons between cells, or cell populations rather than looking at cells individually in order to determine chromosome instability. These differences should be examined statistically as well.
- The rates in the cell population being tested should be compared to a reference cell population. This is especially true in low phenotype chromosomal instability, where the changes are subtle.
- The number of cell divisions undergone by a cell population should be related to the rate of chromosomal change.
- A chromosomal instability assay should measure not only whole chromosome change rates, but also the partial chromosomal changes such as deletions, insertions, inversion and amplifications to also take into account segmental aneuploidies. This provides a more accurate determination of the presence of chromosome instability.
- The results from polyploid and diploid cells should be identified and separately recorded from one another. This is because the fitness cost (survival to next generation) of chromosomal instability is lower in polyploid cells, as the cell has a greater number of chromosomes to make up for the chromosomal instability it experiences.
- Polyploid cells are more prone to chromosomal changes, something that should be taken into account when determining the presence and degree of chromosomal instability

== Classification ==
Numerical CIN is a high rate of either gain or loss of whole chromosomes; causing aneuploidy. Normal cells make errors in chromosome segregation in 1% of cell divisions, whereas cells with CIN make these errors approximately 20% of cell divisions. Because aneuploidy is a common feature in tumour cells, the presence of aneuploidy in cells does not necessarily mean CIN is present; a high rate of errors is definitive of CIN. One way of differentiating aneuploidy without CIN and CIN-induced aneuploidy is that CIN causes widely variable (heterogeneous) chromosomal aberrations; whereas when CIN is not the causal factor, chromosomal alterations are often more clonal.

Structural CIN is different in that rather than whole chromosomes, fragments of chromosomes may be duplicated or deleted. The rearrangement of parts of chromosomes (translocations) and amplifications or deletions within a chromosome may also occur in structural CIN.

== How Chromosome instability is generated ==
=== Defective DNA damage response ===
A loss in the repair systems for DNA double-stranded breaks and eroded telomeres can allow chromosomal rearrangements that generate loss, amplification and/or exchange of chromosome segments.

Some inherited genetic predispositions to cancer are the result of mutations in machinery that responds to and repairs DNA double-stranded breaks. Examples include ataxia telangiectasia – which is a mutation in the damage response kinase ATM – and BRCA1 or MRN complex mutations that play a role in responding to DNA damage. When the above components are not functional, the cell can also lose the ability to induce cell-cycle arrest or apoptosis. Therefore, the cell can replicate or segregate incorrect chromosomes.

Faulty rearrangements can occur when homologous recombination fails to accurately repair double-stranded breaks. Since human chromosomes contain repetitive DNA sections, broken DNA segments from one chromosome can combine with similar sequences on a non-homologous chromosome. If repair enzymes do not catch this recombination event, the cell may contain non-reciprocal translocation where parts of non-homologous chromosomes are joined together. Non-homologous end joining can also join two different chromosomes together that had broken ends. The reason non-reciprocal translocations are dangerous is the possibility of producing a dicentric chromosome – a chromosome with two centromeres. When dicentric chromosomes form, a series of events can occur called a breakage-fusion-bridge cycle: Spindle fibers attach onto both centromeres in different locations on the chromosome, thereby tearing the chromatid into two pieces during anaphase. The result is a pair of DNAs with broken ends that can attach to other broken-ended DNA segments creating additional translocation and continue the cycle of chromosome breakage and fusion. As the cycle continues, more chromosome translocations result, leading to the amplification or loss of large DNA fragments. Some of these changes will kill the cell, however, in a few rare cases, the rearrangements can lead to a viable cell without tumor suppressor genes and increased expression of proto-oncogenes that may become a tumor cell. Using direct lineage-resolved approaches in living cells, it has been shown that the formation of dicentric chromosomes—and the location of the initiating DNA lesions—deterministically govern subsequent rearrangement processes. Double-strand breaks introduced in close proximity to the centromere frequently give rise to stable isochromosomes, while lesions positioned at non-centromeric regions promote ongoing breakage–fusion–bridge cycling.

=== Degenerating telomeres ===
Telomeres – which are a protective 'cap' at the end of DNA molecules – normally shorten in each replication cycle. In certain cell types, the telomerase enzyme can re-synthesize the telomere sequences, however, it is not present in all somatic cells. Once 25-50 divisions pass, the telomeres can be completely lost, inducing p53 to either permanently arrest the cell or induce apoptosis. Telomere shortening and p53 expression is a key mechanism to prevent uncontrolled replication and tumor development because even cells that excessively proliferate will eventually be inhibited.

However, telomere degeneration can also induce tumorigenesis in other cells. The key difference is the presence of a functional p53 damage response. When tumor cells have a mutation in p53 that results in a non-functional protein, telomeres can continue to shorten and proliferate, and the eroded segments are susceptible to chromosomal rearrangements through recombination and breakage-fusion-bridge cycles. Telomere loss can be lethal for many cells, but in the few that are able to restore the expression of telomerase can bring about a "stable" yet tumorigenic chromosome structure. Telomere degeneration thereby explains the transient period of extreme chromosomal instability observed in many emerging tumors.

In experiments on mice where both telomerase and p53 were knocked out, they developed carcinomas with significant chromosomal instability similar to tumors seen in humans.

=== Additional theories ===
Spindle assembly checkpoint (SAC) abnormalities: The SAC normally delays cell division until all of the chromosomes are accurately attached to the spindle fibers at the kinetochore. Merotelic attachments – when a single kinetochore is connected to microtubules from both spindle poles. Merotelic attachments are not recognized by the SAC, so the cell can attempt to proceed through anaphase. Consequently, the chromatids may lag on the mitotic spindle and not segregate, leading to aneuploidy and chromosome instability.

== Chromosome instability and aneuploidy ==
CIN often results in aneuploidy. There are three ways that aneuploidy can occur. It can occur due to loss of a whole chromosome, gain of a whole chromosome or rearrangement of partial chromosomes known as gross chromosomal rearrangements (GCR). All of these are hallmarks of some cancers. Most cancer cells are aneuploid, meaning that they have an abnormal number of chromosomes which often have significant structural abnormalities such as chromosomal translocations, where sections of one chromosome are exchanged or attached onto another. Changes in ploidy can alter expression of proto-oncogenes or tumor suppressor genes.

Segmental aneuploidy can occur due to deletions, amplifications or translocations, which arise from breaks in DNA, while loss and gain of whole chromosomes is often due to errors during mitosis.

== Genome integrity ==
Chromosomes consist of the DNA sequence, and the proteins (such as histones) that are responsible for its packaging into chromosomes. Therefore, when referring to chromosome instability, epigenetic changes can also come into play. Genes on the other hand, refer only to the DNA sequence (hereditary unit) and it is not necessary that they will be expressed once epigenetic factors are taken into account. Disorders such as chromosome instability can be inherited via genes, or acquired later in life due to environmental exposure. One way that Chromosome Instability can be acquired is by exposure to ionizing radiation. Radiation is known to cause DNA damage, which can cause errors in cell replication, which may result in chromosomal instability. Chromosomal instability can in turn cause cancer. However, chromosomal instability syndromes such as Bloom syndrome, ataxia telangiectasia and Fanconi anaemia are inherited and are considered to be genetic diseases. These disorders are associated with tumor genesis, but often have a phenotype on the individuals as well. The genes that control chromosome instability are known as chromosome instability genes and they control pathways such as mitosis, DNA replication, repair and modification. They also control transcription, and process nuclear transport.

== Chromosome instability and cancer ==
Cancer cells often exhibit chromosomal abnormalities, including chromosomal rearrangements (such as translocations), deletions, and duplications. These abnormalities can disrupt the normal function of genes involved in cell cycle regulation, leading to uncontrolled cell growth and tumor formation. The chromosome theory of cancer is a long-standing idea originated from the work of Theodor Boveri, a German biologist, in the early 20th century. Boveri's studies on sea urchin eggs provided early evidence that abnormal chromosome numbers could lead to developmental defects, leading him to propose a connection between chromosomal abnormalities and cancer. Further research by scientists such as David Hungerford and Peter Nowell in the 1960s identified specific chromosomal abnormalities in cancer cells, such as the Philadelphia chromosome in chronic myeloid leukemia, providing more support for the chromosomal theory of cancer. The chromosomal theory of cancer is a fundamental concept in cancer biology that suggests cancer is caused by genetic changes, particularly alterations in the structure or number of chromosomes in cells. These changes can lead to uncontrolled cell growth, a hallmark of cancer.

CIN is a more pervasive mechanism in cancer genetic instability than simple accumulation of point mutations. The degree of instability varies between cancer types. For example, in cancers where mismatch repair mechanisms are defective – like some colon and breast cancers – their chromosomes are relatively stable.

Cancers can go through periods of extreme instability where chromosome number can vary within the population. Rapid chromosomal instability is thought to be caused by telomere erosion. However, the period of rapid change is transient as tumor cells generally reach an equilibrium abnormal chromosome content and number.

The research associated with chromosomal instability is associated with solid tumors, which are tumors that refer to a solid mass of cancer cells that grow in organ systems and can occur anywhere in the body. These tumors are opposed to liquid tumors, which occur in the blood, bone marrow, and lymph nodes.

Although chromosome instability has long been proposed to promote tumor progression, recent studies suggest that chromosome instability can either promote or suppress tumor progression. The difference between the two are related to the amount of chromosomal instability taking place, as a small rate of chromosomal instability leads to tumor progression, or in other words cancer, while a large rate of chromosomal instability is often lethal to cancer. This is due to the fact that a large rate of chromosomal instability is detrimental to the survival mechanisms of the cell, and the cancer cell cannot replicate and dies (apoptosis). Therefore, the relationship between chromosomal instability and cancer can also be used to assist with diagnosis of malignant vs. benign tumors.

The level of chromosome instability is influenced both by DNA damage during the cell cycle and the effectiveness of the DNA damage response in repairing damage. The DNA damage response during interphase of the cell cycle (G1, S and G2 phases) helps protect the genome against structural and numerical cancer chromosome instability. However untimely activation of the DNA damage response once cells have committed to the mitosis stage of the cell cycle appears to undermine genome integrity and induce chromosome segregation errors.

A majority of human solid malignant tumors is characterized by chromosomal instability, and have gain or loss of whole chromosomes or fractions of chromosomes. For example, the majority of colorectal and other solid cancers have chromosomal instability (CIN). This shows that chromosomal instability can be responsible for the development of solid cancers. However, genetic alterations in a tumor do not necessarily indicate that the tumor is genetically unstable, as 'genomic instability' refers to various instability phenotypes, including the chromosome instability phenotype

The role of CIN in carcinogenesis has been heavily debated. While some argue the canonical theory of oncogene activation and tumor suppressor gene inactivation, such as Robert Weinberg, some have argued that CIN may play a major role in the origin of cancer cells, since CIN confers a mutator phenotype that enables a cell to accumulate large number of mutations at the same time. Scientists active in this debate include Christoph Lengauer, Kenneth W. Kinzler, Keith R. Loeb, Lawrence A. Loeb, Bert Vogelstein and Peter Duesberg.

Current research in cancer genetics is focused on further understanding the role of chromosomal abnormalities in cancer development and progression. Advances in technology, such as next-generation sequencing, are enabling researchers to study chromosomal abnormalities in cancer cells with greater detail and precision.

=== Chromosome instability in anticancer therapy ===
Hypothetically, the heterogeneous gene expression that can occur in a cell with CIN, the rapid genomic changes can drive the emergence of drug-resistant tumor cells. While some studies show that CIN is associated with poor patient outcomes and drug resistance, conversely, others studies actually find that people respond better with high CIN tumors.

Some researchers believe that CIN can be stimulated and exploited to generate lethal interactions in tumor cells. ER negative breast cancer patients with the most extreme CIN have the best prognosis, with similar results for ovarian, gastric and non-small cell lung cancers. A potential therapeutic strategy therefore could be to exacerbate CIN specifically in tumor cells to induce cell death. For example, BRCA1, BRCA2 and BC-deficient cells have a sensitivity to poly(ADP-ribose) polymerase (PARP) which helps repair single-stranded breaks. When PARP is inhibited, the replication fork can collapse. Therefore, PARP tumor suppressing drugs could selectively inhibit BRCA tumors and cause catastrophic effects to breast cancer cells. Clinical trials of PARP inhibition are ongoing.

There is still a worry that targeting CIN in therapy could trigger genome chaos that actually increases CIN that leads to selection of proliferative advantages.

Targeted therapies, such as imatinib for chronic myeloid leukemia and trastuzumab for HER2-positive breast cancer, have been developed based on the specific chromosomal abnormalities associated with these cancers.

== Chromosome instability and metastasis ==
Chromosomal instability has been identified as a genomic driver of metastasis. Chromosome segregation errors during mitosis lead to the formation of structures called micronuclei. These micronuclei, which reside outside of the main nucleus have defective envelopes and often rupture exposing their genomic DNA content to the cytoplasm. Exposure of double-stranded DNA to the cytosol activates anti-viral pathways, such as the cGAS-STING cytosolic DNA-sensing pathway. This pathway is normally involved in cellular immune defenses against viral infections. Tumor cells hijack chronic activation of innate immune pathways to spread to distant organs, suggesting that CIN drives metastasis through chronic inflammation stemming in a cancer cell-intrinsic manner.

== Diagnostic methods ==
Chromosomal instability can be diagnosed using analytical techniques at the cellular level. Techniques commonly used to diagnose CIN include cytogenetics, flow cytometry, comparative genomic hybridization, and polymerase chain reaction. Karyotyping, and fluorescence in situ hybridization (FISH) are other techniques that can be used. In comparative genomic hybridization, DNA is extracted from large cell populations, making it likely that multiple chromosomal gains and losses will be identified. Karyotyping is used for Fanconi Anemia, based on 73-hour whole-blood cultures, which are then stained with Giemsa. Following staining they are observed for microscopically visible chromatid-type aberrations

== See also ==
- Microsatellite instability, another form of genomic instability
