= Shaan Patel =

American entrepreneur and physician

- Born: Shaan Patel; Las Vegas, Nevada, U.S.
- Education: University of Southern California (BA); Keck School of Medicine of the University of Southern California (MD)
- Occupations: Physician, entrepreneur, author
- Years active: 2010–present
- Organization: Prep Expert

Shaan Patel is an American physician, entrepreneur, and author. He is the founder of Prep Expert.

== Early life and career ==
Patel attended the University of Southern California for his undergraduate studies in biology. He later earned a Doctor of Medicine (MD) from the Keck School of Medicine of USC and a Master of Business Administration (MBA) from the Yale School of Management.

Patel founded Prep Expert, an education company for standardized test preparation.

He appeared on the television program Shark Tank, where he entered into an investment agreement with investor Mark Cuban.

In addition to his business activities, Patel completed dermatology training at Temple University Hospital, and currently practices teledermatology.

Patel has authored multiple books related to standardized test preparation, self-development, and entrepreneurship including:

- SAT 2400 in Just 7 Steps
- Self-Made Success
- Prep Expert Digital SAT Playbook
- Kid Start-Up: How YOU Can Become an Entrepreneur
