= HBF =

HBF may refer to:

- HBF (insurer), an Australian health insurance fund
- Perth Rectangular Stadium, in Perth, Western Australia known for sponsorships reasons as HBF Park
- Hauptbahnhof (Hbf), German for central railway station
- Hemoglobin F (HbF), or fetal hemoglobin
- Human Betterment Foundation, a eugenics organization established in 1928 by E.S. Gosney
- Hepatitis B Foundation, biomedical research foundation
- Home Builders Federation, a trade association
