= Maureen Murphy =

Maureen Murphy may refer to:

- Maureen Murphy (politician) (1952–2008), politician in Illinois
- Maureen Murphy (ice hockey) (born 1999), American ice hockey player
- Maureen Murphy (comedian), Australian comedian and actress
- Maureen Murphy (scientist), cancer researcher at The Wistar Institute
- Maureen Murphy (swimmer) (1939–2019), American swimmer
