= Manfred Bayer =

Prussian-born American medical doctor and microscopist

Dr. Manfred E. Bayer (22 September 1928 – 27 February 2015) was a medical doctor and a microscopist, best known for his research in bacterial and viral infrastructure using electron microscopy. He was the first person to visualize yellow fever virus in cultured cells and to obtain ultra-thin sections of the cell wall of E. coli by penicillin.

== Early life ==
Bayer was born in Görlitz, Prussia. He joined the University of Kiel, Germany for higher studies in biology and obtained his degree in 1949. He studied medicine at the University of Hamburg, Germany. He completed his clinical training in 1953. He enrolled for physics in the same university and got a degree in 1959. His research on pathology enabled him to become the Research Associate at the University of Hamburg. He also did his diploma in tropical medicine and parasitology at the University of Hamburg.

== Career and research ==
Bayer served as the Assistant member of the Institute of Tropical diseases and Parasitology. Later, he joined the Institute for Cancer Research (now Fox Chase Cancer Center in Philadelphia) as a research associate. He was also the Professor of Microbiology at the University of Pennsylvania Medical School from 1971 to 2000. He was an honorary visiting professor at Dalhousie University, Halifax. He died on February 27, 2015, at his home in Crozet, Virginia.

Beyer is known for his research on use of water-soluble embedding resins in electron microscopy. The use of resins will solidify samples so that thin sections could be obtained for electron micrography. He is also credited with the discovery of the structural units of hepatitis virus. This discovery was crucial for the invention of vaccine against Hepatitis.

== Awards ==
Dr. Bayer has won the Japanese Society for the Promotion in Science award. He was an editorial member in the Journal of Bacteriology. He was given a research grant by Lyme Disease Association Inc. for his research on Effects of Low Frequency Magnetic Fields on Borrelia burgdorferi.
