= Protein dimer =

Macromolecular complex formed by two, usually non-covalently bound, macromolecules

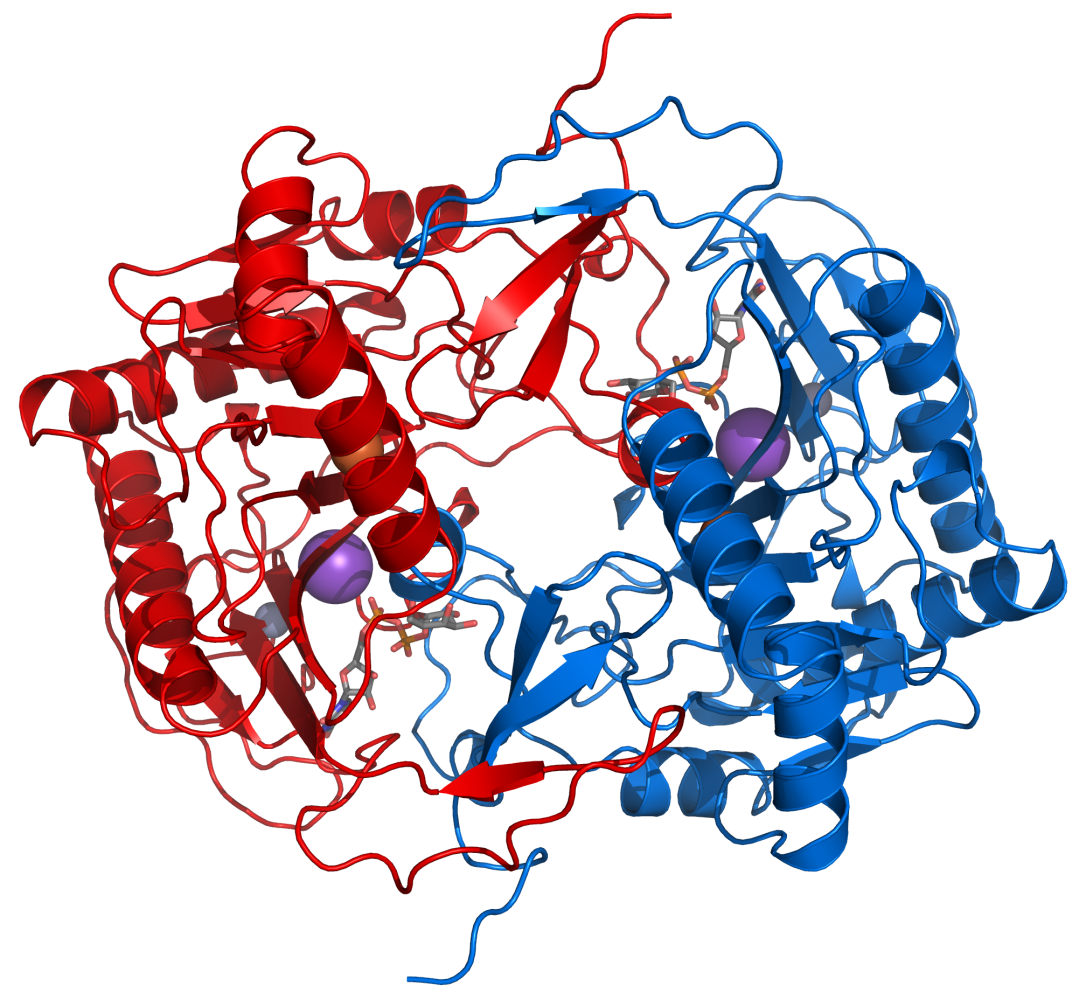
Ribbon diagram of a dimer of Escherichia coli galactose-1-phosphate uridylyltransferase (GALT) in complex with UDP-galactose. Potassium, zinc, and iron ions are visible as purple, gray, and bronze-colored spheres respectively.

In biochemistry, a protein dimer is a macromolecular complex or multimer formed by two protein monomers, or single proteins, which are usually non-covalently bound. Many macromolecules, such as proteins or nucleic acids, form dimers. The word dimer has roots meaning "two parts", di- + -mer. A protein dimer is a type of protein quaternary structure.

A protein homodimer is formed by two identical proteins while a protein heterodimer is formed by two different proteins.

Most protein dimers in biochemistry are not connected by covalent bonds. An example of a non-covalent heterodimer is the enzyme reverse transcriptase, which is composed of two different amino acid chains. An exception is dimers that are linked by disulfide bridges such as the homodimeric protein NEMO.

Some proteins contain specialized domains to ensure dimerization (dimerization domains) and specificity.

The G protein-coupled cannabinoid receptors have the ability to form both homo- and heterodimers with several types of receptors such as mu-opioid, dopamine and adenosine A2 receptors.

== Examples ==
- Transcription factors
  - Leucine zipper motif proteins
- 14-3-3 proteins
- Variable surface glycoproteins of the Trypanosoma parasite
- Tubulin
- Some clotting factors
  - Factor XI
  - Factor XIII
  - Fibrinogen
- Some receptors
  - Nuclear receptors
  - G protein βγ-subunit dimer
  - Toll-like receptor
  - Receptor tyrosine kinases
- Some enzymes
  - Type II restriction enzymes
  - Triosephosphateisomerase (TIM)
  - Alcohol dehydrogenase
- Some viral proteins
  - Mammarenaviruses Z matrix protein

== Alkaline phosphatase ==
E. coli alkaline phosphatase, a dimer enzyme, exhibits intragenic complementation. That is, when particular mutant versions of alkaline phosphatase were combined, the heterodimeric enzymes formed as a result exhibited a higher level of activity than would be expected based on the relative activities of the parental enzymes. These findings indicated that the dimer structure of the E. coli alkaline phosphatase allows cooperative interactions between the constituent mutant monomers that can generate a more functional form of the holoenzyme. The dimer has two active sites, each containing two zinc ions and a magnesium ion.

== See also ==
- Dimerization
- Protein trimer
- Oligomer
- ProtCID
