= Robert P. Perry =

American biophysicist and molecular biologist (1931–2013)

- Born: Robert Palese Perry; January 10, 1931; Chicago, Illinois, U.S.
- Died: July 15, 2013 (aged 82); Churchville, Pennsylvania, U.S.
- Education: Northwestern University (B.S.); University of Chicago (Ph.D.)
- Known for: Research on RNA synthesis and processing in mammalian cells, including rRNA maturation and studies related to mRNA 5′-end modifications (5′ cap)
- Awards: Guggenheim Fellowship (1974–1975); Stanley P. Reimann Honor Award (Fox Chase Cancer Center)
- Scientific career
- Fields: Molecular biology, biophysics, RNA biology
- Workplaces: Fox Chase Cancer Center; University of Pennsylvania

Robert Palese Perry (January 10, 1931 – July 15, 2013) was an American biophysicist and molecular biologist whose research focused on RNA synthesis, processing, and regulation in mammalian cells. He spent most of his career at Fox Chase Cancer Center (then the Institute for Cancer Research) and also held faculty appointments at the University of Pennsylvania. He was elected to the United States National Academy of Sciences in 1977.

== Early life and education ==
Perry was born in Chicago. He received a bachelor's degree in mathematics from Northwestern University in 1951 and earned a Ph.D. in biophysics from the University of Chicago in 1956.

== Career ==
Perry joined Fox Chase Cancer Center in 1960 and remained there for decades. He served as associate director of the Fox Chase Institute for Cancer Research from 1971 to 1974. He was the inaugural holder of Fox Chase's Stanley P. Reimann Chair in Oncology Research (1993–2008).

At the University of Pennsylvania, he became a professor in 1973 and later served as an adjunct professor (1976–1995). He retired from Fox Chase in 2006.

== Research ==
Perry's research addressed multiple steps of gene expression in mammalian cells. His work included studies on the origin and maturation of ribosomal RNA and on the relationship between heterogeneous nuclear RNA and cytoplasmic mRNA, including evidence for capped 5′ ends in nuclear and cytoplasmic RNA.

== Honors and service ==
Perry was elected to the National Academy of Sciences in 1977. He was a Guggenheim Fellow in 1974–1975. He participated in a National Academy of Sciences Committee on Human Rights and a 1978 fact-finding mission to Argentina and Uruguay. He was a former president of the UNESCO-based International Cell Research Organization and served as an Italian translator while in the U.S. Army Reserve.

== Selected publications ==
- Perry, R. P.; Kelley, D. E. (April 1975). "The methylated constituents of L cell messenger RNA: evidence for an unusual cluster at the 5′ terminus". Cell. 4 (4): 387–394. doi:10.1016/0092-8674(75)90159-2. PMID 1168101.
- Perry, R. P.; Kelley, D. E. (July 1976). "Kinetics of formation of 5′ terminal caps in mRNA". Cell. 8 (3): 433–442. doi:10.1016/0092-8674(76)90156-2. PMID 954097.
