= MolIDE =

Developed by the Dunbrack group at Fox Chase Cancer Center, MolIDE is an open-source cross-platform program for comparative modelling of protein structures. MolIDE acts as a graphical user interface to the common tasks involved in predicting protein structures based on known homologous structures. It implements the most frequently used steps involved in modeling: secondary structure prediction, multiple-round psiblast alignments, assisted alignment editing (integrating a template viewer and secondary structure prediction), side chain replacement and loop building.
