= Erica Golemis =

American oncologist

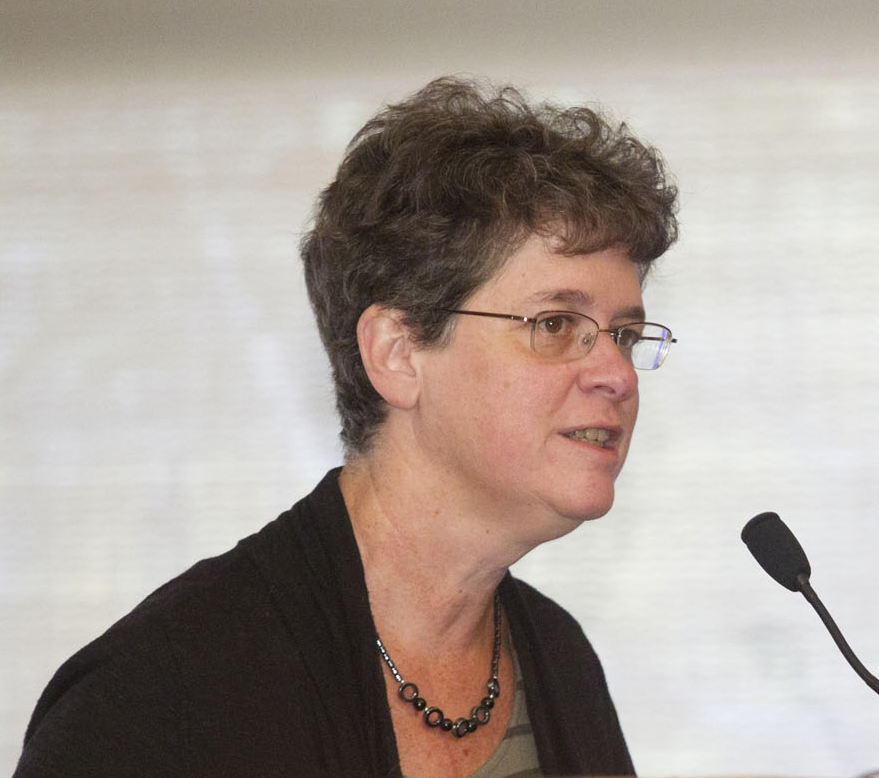
- Golemis in 2011

Academic background
- Education: BA, 1983, Bryn Mawr College; PhD, Biology, 1988, Massachusetts Institute of Technology
- Thesis: Genetic analysis of the role of the friend and moloney retroviral enhancers in determining disease specificity (1988)

Erica A. Golemis is an American oncologist. She is the William Wikoff Smith Chair in Cancer Research at Fox Chase Cancer Center, as well as the Senior Associate Dean of Research and Chairperson of the Department of Cancer and Cellular Biology at the Lewis Katz School of Medicine at Temple University.

== Early life and education ==
Golemis was the only daughter born to parents Emanuel and Marion Golemis. Her mother graduated from the Pratt Institute in 1954 and worked as an engineer at the Port Authority of New York and New Jersey. Golemis completed her Bachelor of Arts degree in biology and English at Bryn Mawr College in 1983 and her PhD at the Massachusetts Institute of Technology in 1988. Following her PhD, she began her post-doctoral studies at Massachusetts General Hospital and Harvard Medical School. During her time at MIT, Golemis researched retroviruses in relation to specific types of cancer before transitioning to developing protein interaction technology.

== Career ==
As a result of her graduate and post-doctoral work, Golemis was recruited to Fox Chase Cancer Center in 1993 to start her independent laboratory. Upon starting her laboratory, Golemis's research team were one of the first to describe the complete sequence of the NEDD9 gene and provided an initial functional analysis of NEDD9 protein. Based on this, Golemis demonstrated in 2009 that a decreased NEDD9 in living bodies also limited the appearance of aggressive metastatic breast cancer. She later built on this discovery and reported that NEDD9 also controlled the growth of progenitor cells that gives rise to tumors.

Throughout her tenure at Fox Chase, Golemis focused on improving cancer diagnosis and treatment through cell signalling pathways. As such, she was appointed the William Wikoff Smith Endowed Chair in Cancer Research in 2019. Following this promotion, Golemis was elected a Fellow of the American Association for the Advancement of Science for her work on the cell cilium. In 2020, Golemis was also appointed senior editor at eLife, an open-access, peer-reviewed journal.

In 2021, Golemis oversaw a research team that found that NEDD9 was a negative regulator of a signalling pathway controlling autophagy in early-stage non-small cell lung cancer. Later, she helped identify that the Musashi-2 protein had the potential to both identify targeted therapies for certain patients with non-small cell lung cancer and to serve as a target for the development of new therapies. In the following year, Golemis' laboratory examined 1,600 tumors with patterns of mutation in TP53 and CDKN2A in order to show that patterns of hotspot mutations in TP53 differed depending on the presence or absence of a co-occurring CDKN2A mutation.
