= Tim J. Yen =

American molecular biologist

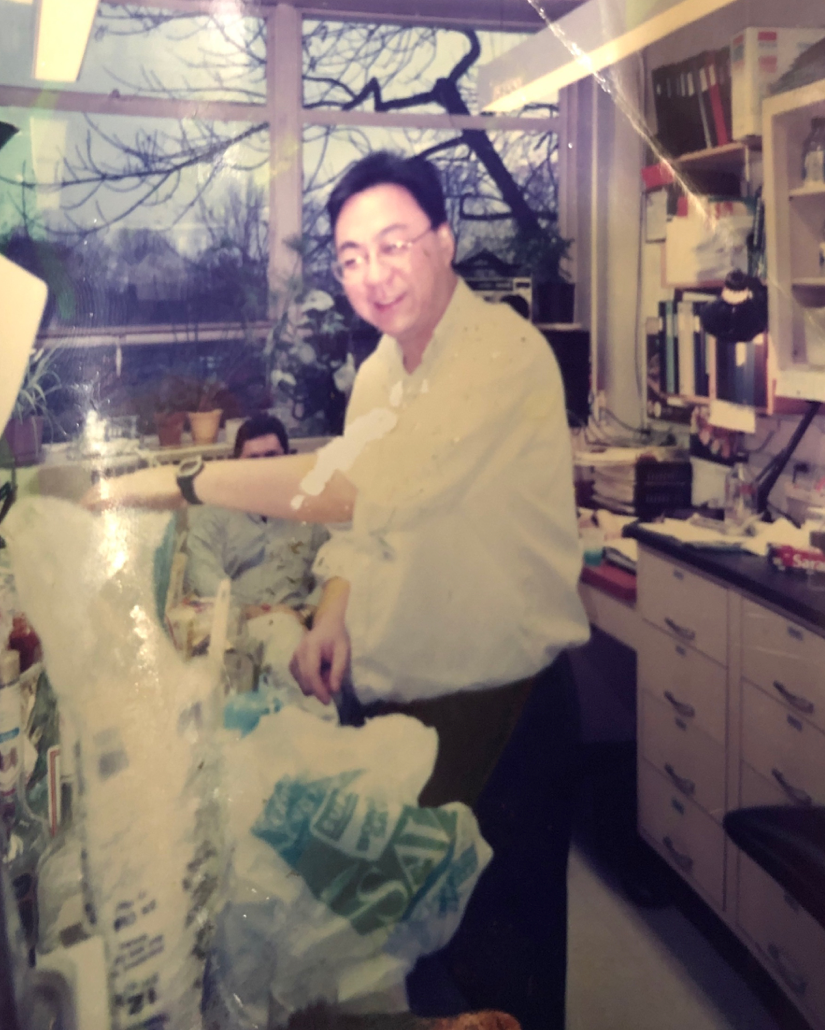
- Education: University of California, Santa Barbara (BS, MA, PhD)
- Scientific career
- Workplaces: Fox Chase Cancer Center

Tim J. Yen is an American molecular biologist and cancer biologist. Yen held the rank of Professor and in 2023, became Emeritus at Fox Chase Cancer Center in Philadelphia, Pennsylvania. Yen is known for pioneering work in the field of mitosis.

== Biography ==
Yen earned a BS in biochemistry from the University of California, Santa Barbara in 1978. He remained at the University to earn his MA in biochemistry in 1981, and his PhD in molecular biology in 1985. Yen worked as a postdoctoral fellow with Don W. Cleveland at the Johns Hopkins School of Medicine.

== Contributions to science ==
Prior to the 1990s, the molecular mechanisms of how microtubule fibers drive chromosome movement in mitosis were largely unresolved. As a post-doc in 1991, Tim Yen identified CENP-E, the first mitotic motor protein and found to be essential for progression through mitosis.

Over the course of 30 years as an independent researcher, Yen made further seminal discoveries in the field of mitosis. These include, cloning of CENP-F (a nuclear matrix protein with cell cycle specific distribution), characterization of ATM, and identification of kinetochore assembly pathways. In 2001, Yen discovered the “mitotic checkpoint complex”, a multi-protein complex that inhibits the critical transition from metaphase to anaphase.

His more recent work has since shown how this checkpoint functions to maintain accurate chromosomal segregation through “activation" following aberrant microtubules to chromosome attachments, an essential process in preventing aneuploidy, and thereby plays an important role in both oncogenesis and cancer therapy.

== Most cited papers ==
- Sudakin V, Chan GK, Yen TJ. Checkpoint inhibition of the APC/C in HeLa cells is mediated by a complex of BUBR1, BUB3, CDC20, and MAD2. Journal of cell biology. 2001 Sep 3;154(5):925-36. According to Google Scholar, it has been cited 1021 times.
- Yen TJ, Li G, Schaar BT, Szilak I, Cleveland DW. CENP-E is a putative kinetochore motor that accumulates just before mitosis. Nature. 1992 Oct;359(6395):536-9. According to Google Scholar, this article has been cited 457 times
- Yen TJ, Compton DA, Wise D, Zinkowski RP, Brinkley BR, Earnshaw WC, Cleveland DW. CENP‐E, a novel human centromere‐associated protein required for progression from metaphase to anaphase. The EMBO journal. 1991 May;10(5):1245-54. According to Google Scholar, this article has been cited 457 times
- Wan X, O'Quinn RP, Pierce HL, Joglekar AP, Gall WE, DeLuca JG, Carroll CW, Liu ST, Yen TJ, McEwen BF, Stukenberg PT. Protein architecture of the human kinetochore microtubule attachment site. Cell. 2009 May 15;137(4):672-84. According to Google Scholar, this article has been cited 351 times
