= Irving Millman =

American virologist (1923–2012)

Irving Millman (May 23, 1923 – April 17, 2012) was a noted virologist and microbiologist. He was a member of the U.S. Army's Eighth Armored Division during the Second World War, earning a Bronze Star. In 1948, Millman earned a bachelor's degree from the City College of New York. He did his graduate work at the University of Kentucky and Northwestern University's School of Medicine.

Millman's work with Baruch Blumberg helped lead to the creation of a test to detect hepatitis B. The test allowed blood banks to identify the hepatitis B virus in the blood of potential donors, thereby preventing the spread of the virus.

Later research by the team led to a vaccine that is now commonly given to neonates (newborns). Millman and Blumberg found that the blood of individuals who carried the hepatitis B virus contained particles of the outside coating of the virus. The coating, hepatitis B surface antigen (HBsAg), is not infectious; however, HBsAG can provoke an immune response. In order to develop a vaccine, Millman and Blumberg developed a method of detaching the coatings from the virus. He was Jewish.
