= Temple University Hospital =

- Temple University Health System
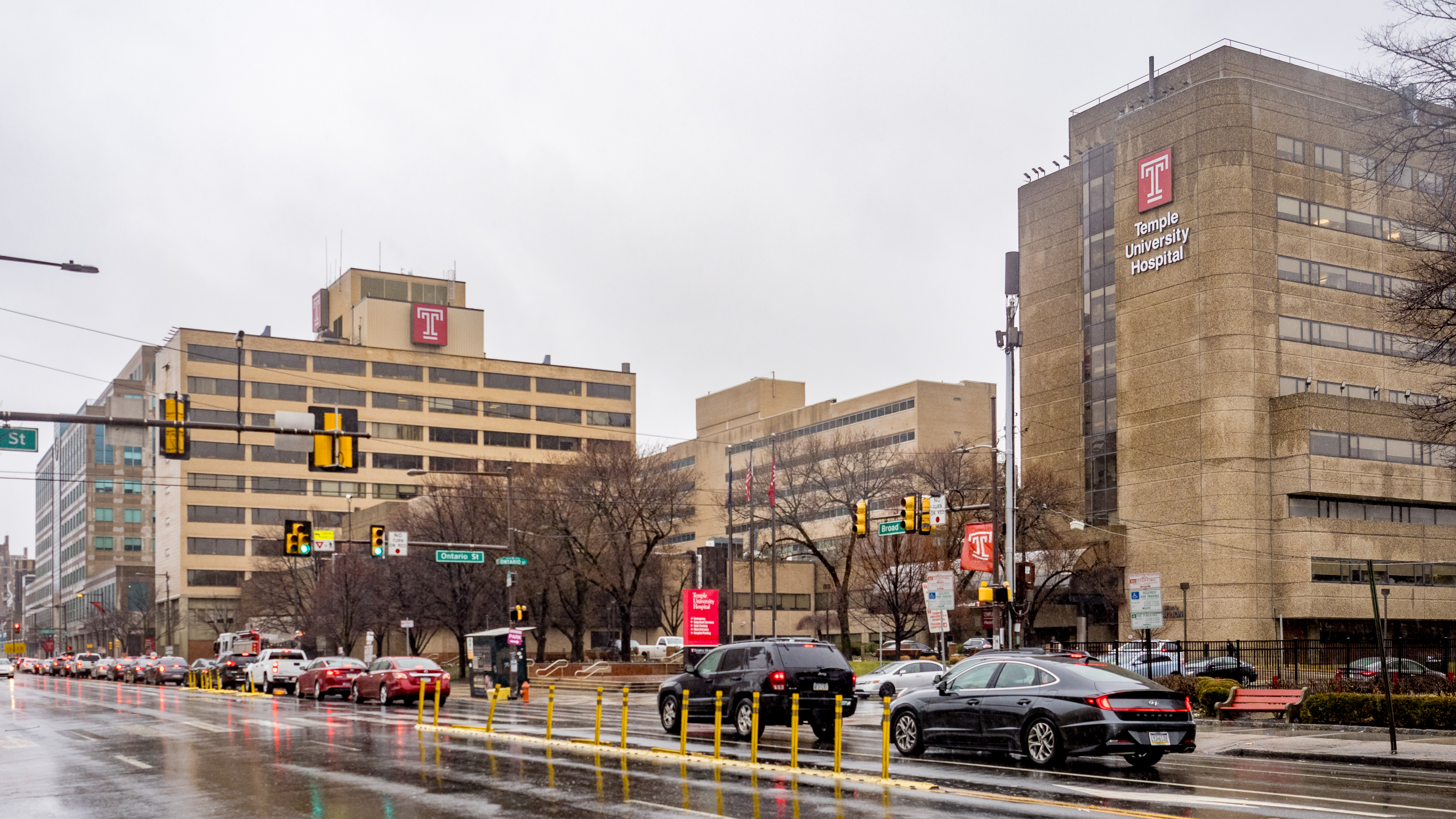
- (2024)

Geography
- Location: 3401 North Broad Street, Philadelphia, Pennsylvania, U.S.
- Coordinates: 40°00′19″N 75°09′03″W

Organisation
- Care system: Private
- Type: Teaching
- Affiliated university: Temple University School of Medicine
- Network: Temple University Health System

Services
- Emergency department: Level 1 Trauma Center
- Beds: 722

Helipads
- Helipad: FAA LID: PA62
Number	Length		Surface
Number	ft	m	Surface
H1	46	14	Roof/top

History
- Founded: 1892

Links
- Website: tuh.templehealth.org

Temple University Hospital (TUH) in Philadelphia, Pennsylvania is an academic medical center in the United States which is a part of the healthcare network Temple Health. It is the chief clinical training site for the Temple University School of Medicine. The hospital currently has a 722-bed capacity that offers comprehensive inpatient and outpatient services to the surrounding community, and highly specialized tertiary services in the Philadelphia metropolitan area.

In 2015, Temple University Hospital had more than 84,000 emergency department and 200,000 outpatient visits.

In August 2011, Becker's Hospital Review listed Temple University Hospital as number 10 on the 100 Top Grossing Hospitals in America with $5.9 billion in gross revenue.

== History ==
It was originally the Samaritan Hospital which was founded by Russell Conwell and his congregation, Baptist Temple, on January 18, 1892, through the purchase of a three-story house at the intersection of Broad and Ontario St. The undertaking served to support the local community, as well as those who had limited access to healthcare.

The original hospital had twenty beds and only two full-time staff members. The hospital expanded with the addition of the Greathart Hospital as a maternity hospital and further facilities in the next decade after its founding. Samaritan Hospital was renamed to Temple University Hospital in 1929.

William Parkinson, who was appointed as the director of the hospital and Dean of School of Medicine in February 1929, oversaw its renovation and expansion to a 500-bed capacity by 1940. Development progressed in 1950s with the leadership of William Parkinson as three new buildings were added to accommodate the increasing number of individuals served by the hospital. A new ancillary and outpatient building were added along with Parkinson Pavilion, which added 600 inpatient beds. Further development came in December 1982 when a replacement hospital was approved on Broad and Ontario to replace the main hospital building with a 504-bed facility. The new nine-story hospital opened in 1986 with an expanded emergency department, while the Parkinson Pavilion was renovated to an outpatient facility.

=== Temple University Health System ===
Until 1994, Temple University and Temple University Hospital were one entity. Peter J. Liacouras, the president of Temple University at that time, and the board of trustees separated hospital-related activities with the creation of Temple University Health System (TUHS) as a private non-profit entity.

== Specialties ==
Temple University Hospital has a number of specialties including Abdominal Organ Transplant Program, Bariatric Surgery Program, Bone Marrow transplant Program, Burn Center, Cancer Center, Digestive Disease Center, Heart and Vascular Institute, Lung Center, Neurosciences Center and Orthopaedics & Sports Medicine.

== See also ==
- Fox Chase Cancer Center
- Temple University
- Temple University School of Medicine
