= Temple Health =

American non-profit healthcare network

- Company type: Non-profit healthcare
- Industry: Healthcare, hospitals
- Founded: 1994
- Headquarters: Philadelphia, United States
- Services: Primary, secondary, and tertiary care centers; ambulatory clinics
- Website: www.templehealth.org

Temple Health, also known as Temple University Health System, is a non-profit academic healthcare network based in Philadelphia, Pennsylvania. Its flagship hospital is Temple University Hospital, a safety net hospital, located in Philadelphia. Research activities are carried out by the affiliates of Temple University Health System and the Lewis Katz School of Medicine at Temple University.

== Locations ==
Temple Health operates the following hospitals:

- Temple University Hospital
- Temple University Hospital – Jeanes Campus
- Temple University Hospital – Episcopal Campus
- Temple University Hospital – Northeastern Campus
- Temple Health – Fox Chase Cancer Center
- Temple Health – Chestnut Hill Hospital

== History ==
Temple Health began in 1891 as a way for the poor to get needed medical care. Samaritan Hospital was founded by Grace Baptist of Philadelphia and its leader Russell Conwell. In the hospital’s first year, it was overwhelmed with demand. The hospital outgrew its accommodations, and the church built a much-needed addition, promptly paid for by the church offerings. The church also founded Garretson Hospital in 1878. These hospitals were the beginning of Temple Health. Temple University eventually absorbed these hospitals, becoming part of the Temple University Health System.

Until 1994, Temple University and Temple University Hospital were one entity. Peter J. Liacouras, the president of Temple University at that time, and the board of trustees separated hospital-related activities with the creation of Temple University Health System (TUHS).

Affiliated hospitals that make up the health system are Fox Chase Cancer Center, Jeanes Hospital since 1996, and the Episcopal Campus of Temple University Hospital since 1997, primarily providing behavioral health services. Northeastern Hospital became part of the health system in January 1995, but has since faced severe cuts to the services it provided. In July 2009, the hospital was converted to provide only ambulatory services. Temple University Children's Medical Center was built after the formation of the health system in 1994, consisting of 70 beds. The Children's Medical Center shut its doors in 2007 as it faced declining number of patients. Since 1996, TUHS also operates Temple Physicians, which serves as a network of physician practices across the Greater Philadelphia Area.

== See also ==
- List of hospitals in Philadelphia
