= Donald Weeks (academic) =

American plant molecular biologist

Donald Paul Weeks
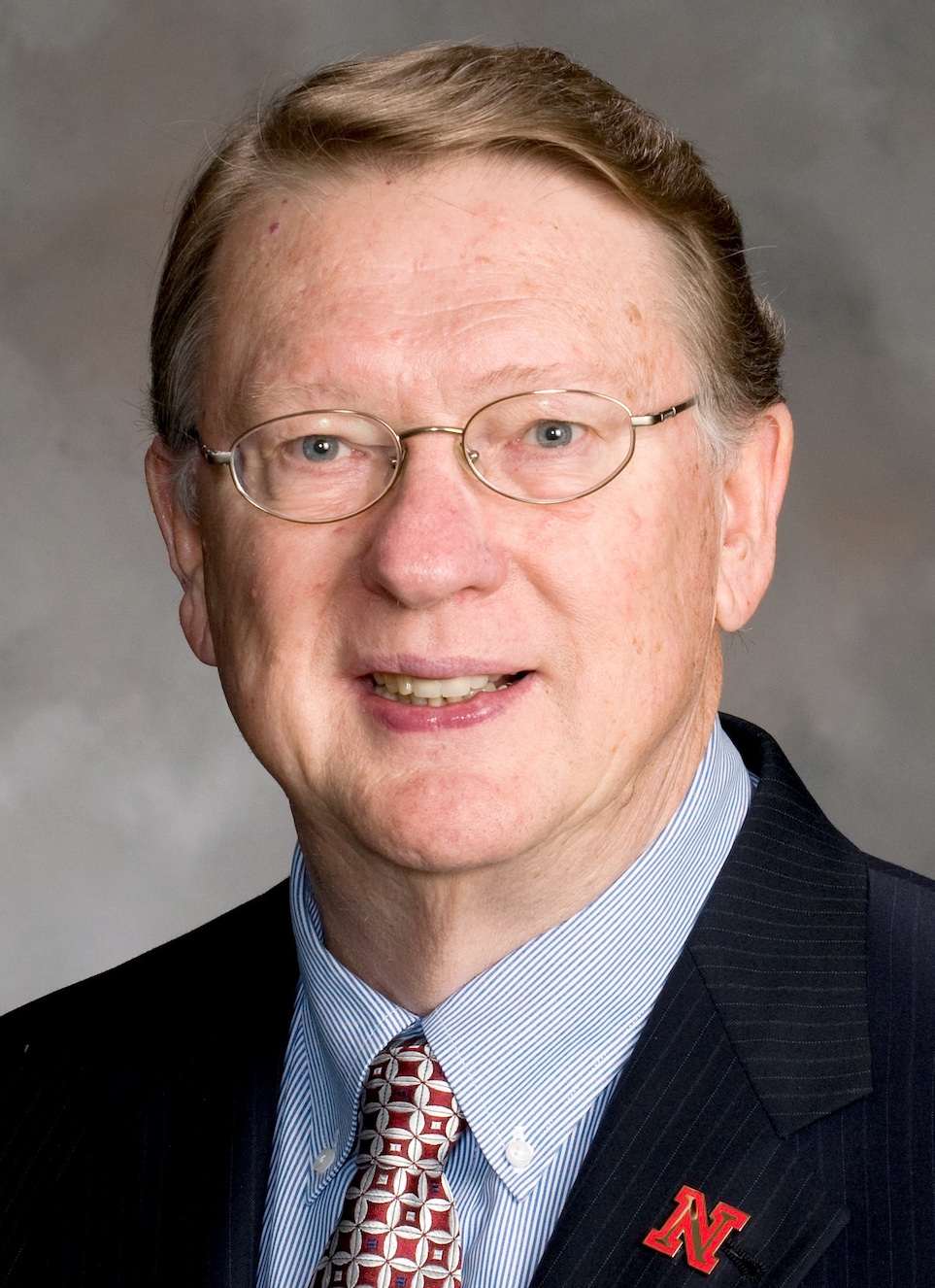
- Born: Vigo County, Indiana, United States
- Occupations: Plant molecular biologist, author and academic

Academic background
- Education: BS; PhD
- Alma mater: Purdue University; University of Illinois Urbana-Champaign

Academic work
- Institutions: Fox Chase Cancer Center, Philadelphia; University of Pennsylvania; University of Nebraska–Lincoln

Donald Paul Weeks is an American plant molecular biologist, author, and academic, serving as Maxcy Professor Emeritus of Agriculture and Natural Resources in the Biochemistry Department at the University of Nebraska–Lincoln. His research encompasses gene regulation, gene editing and the genetic engineering of plant traits, including the development of herbicide-resistant soybean and cotton crops, cultivated on millions of hectares across North and South America.

Weeks has received awards from the University of Nebraska, including the 2009 Innovation, Development, and Engagement Award, the 2014 Outstanding Research and Creative Activity Award, and the Prem S. Paul Innovator of the Year Award in 2016. He is a Fellow of the American Association for the Advancement of Science and the National Academy of Inventors.

== Early life and education ==
Weeks was born and raised on a small farm near Terre Haute, Indiana, where he tended farm animals, crops, and gardens. His involvement in 4-H programs at local, state, and national levels earned him scholarships that enabled him to attend Purdue University in 1959. In 1963, he initiated graduate studies in Agronomy and Biochemistry at the University of Illinois Urbana-Champaign, focusing on the activation of protein synthesis and polyribosome formation during the early phases of maize seed germination, and completed his PhD in 1967. This work led to a postdoctoral position with Abraham Marcus at the Fox Chase Cancer Center in Philadelphia, where he was involved in studies on the molecular mechanisms of protein biosynthesis in eukaryotic cells.

== Career ==
Weeks continued his scientific career at the Fox Chase Cancer Center, becoming a Research Associate in 1970, Assistant Member in 1973, and Associate Member in 1978, while also serving as an adjunct professor at the University of Pennsylvania from 1976 to 1981. Between 1982 and 1989, he worked as a Principal Scientist at the Sandoz Agro Research Institute in the Stanford University Industrial Park in Palo Alto, California. In 1989, he joined the University of Nebraska–Lincoln as Director of the Center for Biotechnology and as a professor in the Biochemistry Department and in the School of Biological Sciences. He was appointed Maxcy Professor of Agriculture and Natural Resources from 2008 to 2015, and has since held the title of Maxcy Professor, emeritus at the University of Nebraska–Lincoln.

Weeks founded and managed the Nebraska NSF EPSCoR Program from 1991 to 1993.

Weeks was elected Chairperson of the North American Council of Biotechnology Centers and served on two Boards of Directors for the affiliated Biotechnology Innovation Organization (BIO) in the mid-1990s.

== Research ==
Weeks' research has centered on gene regulation in eukaryotic cells, genetic engineering, and gene editing in plants, leading to herbicide-resistant crop varieties and CRISPR-based methods for improving plant traits. He is named as an inventor on over 70 patents. Early in his career, he focused on the rapid and extensive induction of tubulin synthesis following the amputation of the two flagella (cilia) in the model algal cell, Chlamydomonas reinhardtii, in studies that were among the first to utilize gene cloning and molecular biology techniques.

While continuing his examination of gene regulation in Chlamydomonas, Weeks also established projects to improve crop plants through genetic engineering, and developed dicamba-resistant soybean and cotton plants. He demonstrated that this resistance trait allowed farmers to control noxious broadleaf weeds resistant to widely used herbicides. Following their introduction in 2016, dicamba-resistant soybean varieties were planted on over 20 million hectares (50 million acres) annually across North and South America, while dicamba-resistant cotton became the dominant type grown in North America. His patent for the dicamba resistance gene became the most highly cited biotechnology patent globally from 2012 to 2016.

In the years prior to his retirement in 2018, Weeks focused on adopting and improving gene editing methods for both Chlamydomonas and crop plants. Collaborating with laboratories at UNL and Iowa State University, he utilized the TALEN gene editing system to develop disease-resistant rice plants, among the earliest examples of gene editing applied to crop improvement. After CRISPR was reported in 2012, his lab adopted this system to enhance its precision and efficiency for gene editing in Chlamydomonas and crop plants. He improved gene editing in Chlamydomonas from a low-efficiency process to one enabling precise and scarless insertion of specific sequences. He also applied CRISPR technology to target genes in oilseed crops, significantly enhancing oil quality.

== Awards and honors ==
- 2009 – Innovation, Development, and Engagement Award, University of Nebraska
- 2009 – Fellow, American Association for the Advancement of Science
- 2014 – Outstanding Research and Creative Activity Award, University of Nebraska
- 2014 – Fellow, National Academy of Inventors
- 2016 – Prem S. Paul Innovator of the Year Award, University of Nebraska–Lincoln

== Selected publications ==
- Weeks, D. P., Verma, D. P. S., Seal, S. N., & Marcus, A. (1972). Role of ribosomal subunits in eukaryotic protein chain initiation. Nature, 236(5343), 167–168.
- Weeks, D. P., & Baxter, R. (1972). Specific inhibition of peptide-chain initiation by 2-(4-methyl-2, 6-dinitroanilino)-N-methylpropionamide. Biochemistry, 11(16), 3060–3064.
- Weeks, D. P., & Collis, P. S. (1976). Induction of microtubule protein synthesis in Chlamydomonas reinhardi during flagellar regeneration. Cell, 9(1), 15–27.
- Brunke, K. J., Anthony, J. G., Sternberg, E. J., & Weeks, D. P. (1984). Repeated consensus sequence and pseudopromoters in the four coordinately regulated tubulin genes of Chlamydomonas reinhardi. Molecular and cellular biology, 4(6), 1115–1124.
- Behrens, M. R., Mutlu, N., Chakraborty, S., Dumitru, R., Jiang, W. Z., LaVallee, B. J., ... & Weeks, D. P. (2007). Dicamba resistance: enlarging and preserving biotechnology-based weed management strategies. Science, 316(5828), 1185–1188.
- Jiang, W., Zhou, H., Bi, H., Fromm, M., Yang, B., & Weeks, D. P. (2013). Demonstration of CRISPR/Cas9/sgRNA-mediated targeted gene modification in Arabidopsis, tobacco, sorghum and rice. Nucleic Acids Research, 41(20), e188-e188.
- Jiang, W. Z., Henry, I. M., Lynagh, P. G., Comai, L., Cahoon, E. B., & Weeks, D. P. (2017). Significant enhancement of fatty acid composition in seeds of the allohexaploid, Camelina sativa, using CRISPR/Cas9 gene editing. Plant biotechnology journal, 15(5), 648–657.
- Gene Editing in Plants (2017) ISBN 978-0128117439
- Akella, S., Ma, X., Bacova, R., Harmer, Z. P., Kolackova, M. ... Weeks, D. P.& Cerutti, H. (2021). Co-targeting strategy for precise, scarless gene editing with CRISPR/Cas9 and donor ssODNs in Chlamydomonas. Plant physiology, 187(4), 2637–2655.
