= Aaron Ciechanover =

Israeli biologist and Nobel Laureate

Aaron Ciechanover ForMem, NAS
- אהרן צ'חנובר
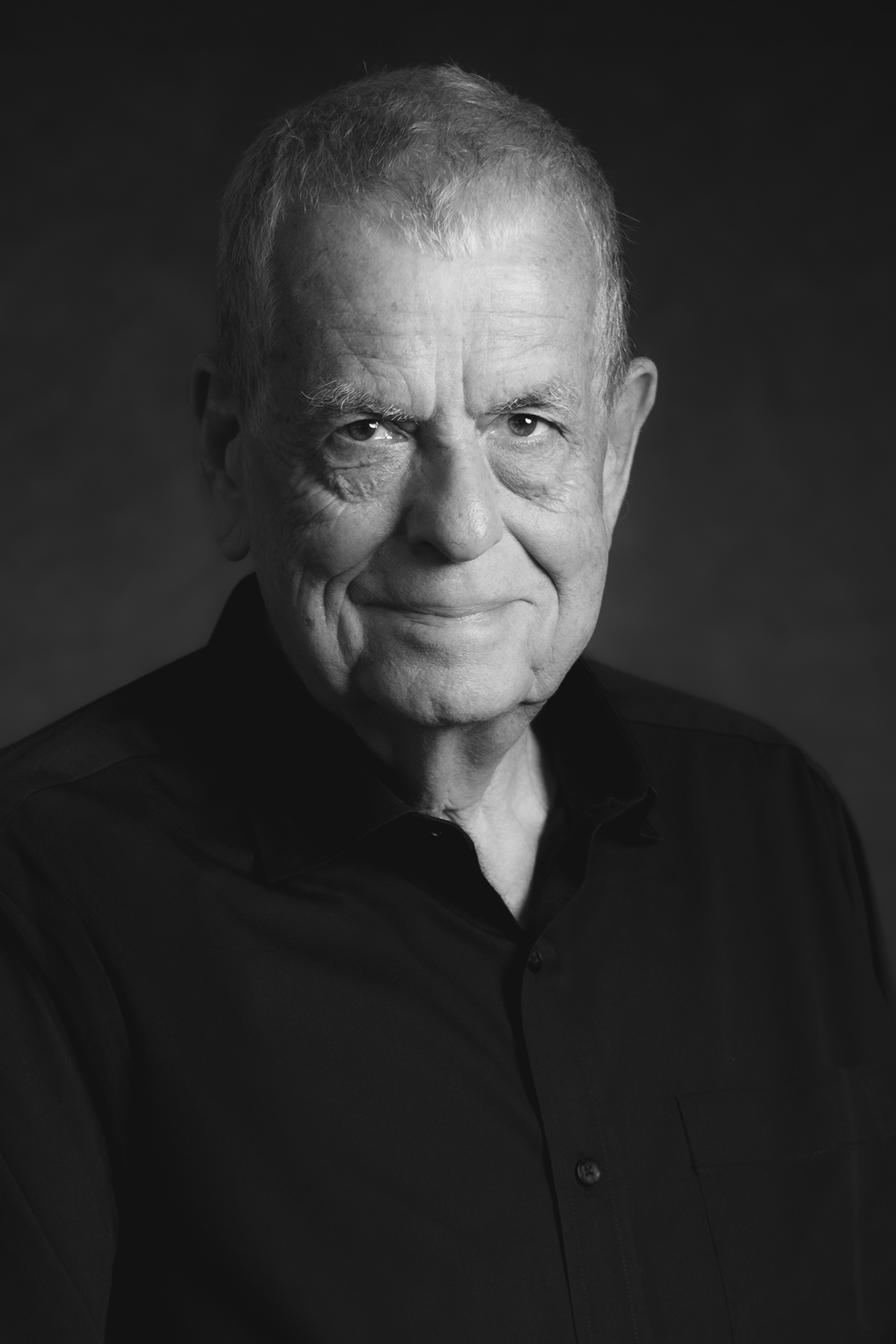
- Ciechanover in 2023
- Born: October 1, 1947 (age 79); Haifa, Israel
- Education: Hebrew University of Jerusalem (MS, MD); Technion – Israel Institute of Technology (DSc)
- Known for: Ubiquitin-mediated protein degradation
- Spouse: Menucha Ciechanover
- Awards: Nobel Prize in Chemistry (2004); Israel Prize (2003); EMET Prize (2002)
- Scientific career
- Fields: Biology
- Workplaces: Technion, Israel; NCKU, Taiwan

Aaron Ciechanover (/ɑːhəˈroʊn tʃiˈhɑːnoʊvɛər/ AH-hə-ROHN chee-HAH-noh-vair; Hebrew: אהרן צ'חנובר; born October 1, 1947) is an Israeli biologist who won the Nobel Prize in Chemistry for characterizing the method that cells use to degrade and recycle proteins using ubiquitin.

== Biography ==
=== Early life ===
Ciechanover was born in Haifa, Israel on 1 October 1947 into a Jewish family. He is the son of Bluma (Lubashevsky), a teacher of English, and Yitzhak Ciechanover, an office worker in a law firm. His parents immigrated to Israel from Poland in the 1920s.

=== Education ===
Upon graduating from high school, Ciechanover joined the Academic Reserve (Atuda) and studied medicine at the Hebrew University of Jerusalem.

He earned a master's degree in science in 1971 and graduated from Hebrew University of Jerusalem in 1974. He received his doctorate in biochemistry in 1981 from the Technion – Israel Institute of Technology in Haifa before conducting postdoctoral research in the laboratory of Harvey Lodish at the Whitehead Institute at MIT from 1981 to 1984.

=== Recent ===
Ciechanover is currently a Technion Distinguished Research Professor in the Ruth and Bruce Rappaport Faculty of Medicine and Research Institute at the Technion. He is a member of the Israel Academy of Sciences and Humanities, the Pontifical Academy of Sciences, the National Academy of Sciences of Ukraine, the Russian Academy of Sciences and is a foreign associate of the United States National Academy of Sciences. In 2008, he was a visiting Distinguished Chair Professor at NCKU, Taiwan. As part of Shenzhen's 13th Five-Year Plan funding research in emerging technologies and opening "Nobel laureate research labs", in 2018 he opened the Ciechanover Institute of Precision and Regenerative Medicine at the Chinese University of Hong Kong, Shenzhen campus.

=== Nobel Prize ===
Ciechanover is one of Israel's first Nobel Laureates in science, earning his Nobel Prize in 2004 for his work in ubiquitination. He is honored for playing a central role in the history of Israel and in the history of the Technion – Israel Institute of Technology.

== Publications and lectures ==
- Ciehanover, A., Hod, Y. and Hershko, A. (1978). A Heat-stable Polypeptide Component of an ATP-dependent Proteolytic System from Reticulocytes. Biochem. Biophys. Res. Commun. 81, 1100–1105. (His name was wrongly transliterated from Hebrew in this publication.)
- Ciechanover, A., Heller, H., Elias, S., Haas, A.L. and Hershko, A. (1980). ATP-dependent Conjugation of Reticulocyte Proteins with the Polypeptide Required for Protein Degradation. Proc. Natl. Acad. Sci. USA 77, 1365–1368.
- Hershko, A. and Ciechanover, A. (1982). Mechanisms of intracellular protein breakdown. Annu. Rev. Biochem. 51, 335–364.
- Hershko, A. and Ciechanover, A. (1998). THE UBIQUITIN SYSTEM. Biochem. 1998 67:1, 425–479
- Ciechanover was an invited guest lecturer at the Yerevan State Medical University in Armenia in 2010.
- He lectured at the Pyongyang University of Science and Technology in North Korea in May 2016.

== Industry involvement ==
Ciechanover has served on the scientific advisory boards of the following companies: Rosetta Genomics (Chairman), BioLineRx, Ltd, StemRad, Ltd, Allosterix Ltd, Proteologics, Inc, MultiGene Vascular Systems, Ltd, Protalix BioTherapeutics, BioTheryX, Inc., and Haplogen, GmbH.

Ciechanover is a member of the advisory board of Patient Innovation, a nonprofit, international, multilingual, free venue for patients and caregivers of any disease to share their innovations.

== Awards ==
- In 2000, Ciechanover received the Albert Lasker Award for Basic Medical Research.
- In 2003, he was awarded the Israel Prize, for biology.
- In 2004, he was awarded the Nobel Prize in Chemistry for his discovery with Avram Hershko and Irwin Rose, of ubiquitin-mediated protein degradation. The ubiquitin-proteasome pathway has a critical role in maintaining the homeostasis of cells and is believed to be involved in the development and progression of cancer, muscular and neurological diseases, and immune and inflammatory responses.
- In 2005, he received the Golden Plate Award of the American Academy of Achievement.
- In 2006, he was awarded the Sir Hans Krebs Medal.
- In 2008, he was conferred Hon. DSc by NCKU Taiwan
- In 2009, he was conferred an Honorary Doctorate in Science by the University of Cambodia.
- In 2011, he was awarded the Humboldt Prize of the Alexander von Humboldt Foundation.
- In 2016, he became a member of the German Academy of Sciences Leopoldina.

== See also ==
- List of Israel Prize recipients
- List of Israeli Nobel laureates
- List of Jewish Nobel laureates
