= Karen Glanz =

American behavioral epidemiologist

- Born: October 20, 1953 (age 73); Pittsburgh, Pennsylvania, United States

Academic background
- Education: BA, Spanish, 1974; MPH, Health Behavior and Health Education, 1977; PhD, Health Behavior and Health Education, 1979, University of Michigan
- Thesis: The effects of intervention strategies to increase adherence to antihypertensive medical regimens: linking research and practice. (1979)

Academic work
- Institutions: University of Pennsylvania; Rollins School of Public Health; Cancer Research Center of Hawaiʻi; Temple University

Karen Glanz (born October 20, 1953) is an American behavioral epidemiologist. She is the George A. Weiss University Professor at the University of Pennsylvania. Glanz is a member of the National Academy of Medicine and has been recognized as one of the world's most influential scientific minds.

== Early life and education ==
Glanz was born on October 20, 1953 in Pittsburgh, Pennsylvania and grew up in the Cleveland suburbs. Growing up during a time when girls were discouraged from participating in sports, she began to recreationally swim daily while in college. She studied at the University of Michigan for her undergraduate degree in Spanish. She received her Master's degree at the University of Michigan School of Public Health and PhD in Health Behavior and Health Education at the Horace H. Rackham School of Graduate Studies.

== Career ==
Upon earning her PhD, Glanz became a professor in the Departments of Health Education and Medicine at Temple University and a member of the Division of Population Sciences at the Fox Chase Cancer Center. While at Temple University, she began to research blood pressure and hypertension control programs for regional businesses and industrial sites. She also began to run marathons with her first half-marathon race being the Philadelphia Distance Run. During her first few years at Temple, Glanz taught health behavior theory without a foundational textbook until she was approached by the publisher Jossey-Bass (now part of Wiley) to co-edit the book Health Behavior and Health Education: Theory, Research and Practice with Barbara Rimer in 1990. This widely used text is now in its 6th Edition and was translated into Japanese, Korean and Chinese. As a result of her research, Glanz received the 1984 Early Career Award from the American Public Health Association and 1992 Mayhew Derryberry Award for outstanding contributions to theory and research in health education.

Glanz left Temple University in 1993 to become a professor and later the founding director of the Social and Behavioral Sciences Program at the Cancer Research Center of Hawaiʻi at the University of Hawaiʻi at Mānoa. While in Hawaiʻi, Glanz founded and directed REAL, the Hawaiʻi Youth Movement Against the Tobacco Industry, before she left in 2004 to join the Rollins School of Public Health. Upon joining the faculty at Emory University, she founded the Emory Prevention Research Center (EPRC) with Michelle Kegler and was later appointed to the Centers for Disease Control and Prevention's Task Force on Community Preventive Services. She served on the U.S. Department of Health and Human Services' Community Preventive Services Task Force (CPSTF) from 2006 until 2016. In 2007, she began a collaboration with the Southwest Georgia Cancer Coalition and New Beginning Missionary Baptist Church to educate the Georgian public about healthy eating. That same year, she was awarded the 2007 Elizabeth Fries Health Education Award for "developing creative and effective interventions to reduce risk behaviors, encourage early detection of cancer, and prevent other acute and chronic diseases".

Glanz stayed at Emory University until 2009 when she became the ninth Penn Integrates Knowledge University Professor with appointments in the Perelman School of Medicine at the University of Pennsylvania and University of Pennsylvania School of Nursing. The following year, she was appointed the inaugural George A. Weiss University Professor in the School of Medicine and School of Nursing. As a result of her academic research, Glanz was elected a Member of the Institute of Medicine (now the National Academy of Medicine) in 2013. At Penn, Glanz led the creation of the University of Pennsylvania's new Prevention Research Center (PRC), funded by the Centers for Disease Control and Prevention and co-led with Dr. Kevin Volpp. She was later recognized by Clarivate, the Intellectual Property and Science business of Thomson Reuters as one of the world's most influential scientific minds and appointed to a four-year term on the Advisory Council for the National Heart, Lung and Blood Institute. In 2018, Glanz was named the associate director for Community Engaged Research and leader for the Cancer Control Program at the Abramson Cancer Center of the University of Pennsylvania.
