= Rosetta Genomics =

Molecular diagnostics company

- Type: Public (Nasdaq: ROSG)
- Industry: Biotechnology
- Founded: 2000; 26 years ago
- Founder: Dr. Isaac Bentwich
- Headquarters: Rehovot, Israel and Jersey City, U.S.
- Key people: Ken Berlin (President and CEO); Dr. Isaac Bentwich (Founder)
- Products: microRNA-based diagnostic tests and therapeutics
- Number of employees: 70 (as of 2008)
- Website: www.rosettagenomics.com

Rosetta Genomics Ltd. was a molecular diagnostics company with offices in Israel and the United States that uses micro-ribonucleic acid (microRNA) biomarkers to develop diagnostic tests designed to differentiate between various types of cancer. The company expects the first three tests based on its technology to be submitted for regulatory approval in 2008. The diagnostic tests will differentiate between squamous and non-squamous non-small cell lung cancer (NSCLC); differentiate between adenocarcinoma and peritoneal mesothelioma; and seek to identify the origin of tumors in patients representing cancer of unknown primary (CUP). Using a single microRNA, the highly sensitive, highly specific test for squamous and non-squamous lung cancer passed the prevalidation phase and was submitted for approval to the New York State Department of Health Clinical Laboratory Evaluation Program in April 2008.

In April 2008, Nature Biotechnology published a study by Rosetta Genomics’ scientists whose findings demonstrated microRNAs' significant potential to act as effective biomarkers that may be applied in a diagnostic test designed to identify the primary tumor site in patients CUP. In addition to its diagnostic programs, Rosetta Genomics is collaborating with Isis Pharmaceuticals to develop a microRNA-based therapy for Hepatocellular carcinoma (HCC), a form of liver cancer.

== Intellectual property ==
Rosetta Genomics developed a microRNA discovery process.

== Platform technologies ==
Rosetta Genomics developed several proprietary technologies that enabled the company to work with microRNAs. At the basis of these technologies are proprietary microRNA extraction protocols that include sensitive extraction of microRNAs from most body fluids, including serum, urine, saliva, with virtually no microRNA lost in the extraction process. The company also developed a microRNA extraction protocol from Formalin Fixed Paraffin Embedded, or FFPE, samples. This allowed extraction of microRNAs from samples preserved at room temperature.

Once microRNAs are extracted, Rosetta Genomics’ technology was capable of detecting and quantifying the microRNAs using two custom designed platform technologies which utilize Quantitative Real Time PCR (or qRT-PCR) and microarrays.

The company's proprietary microarray platform covered approximately 850 human microRNAs, including approximately 180 microRNAs which were Rosetta Genomics’ proprietary microRNAs. The array's high specificity allowed discriminating homologous family members.

== Licenses and collaborations ==
In January 2008, Rosetta Genomics announced a collaboration agreement with the Henry Ford Health System in Detroit, Michigan to develop microRNA-based diagnostics and prognostics for brain cancer. Also in January 2008, Rosetta Genomics announced that its subsidiary, Rosetta Genomics Inc. had received a license to use Roche Molecular Systems' PCR technology in microRNA-based diagnostic tests. In September 2007, Rosetta Genomics said it would work with New York University Medical Center to develop a microRNA-based diagnostic test for melanoma.

In May 2007, Rosetta Genomics announced Columbia University Medical Center would utilize its Clinical Laboratory Improvement Amendments (CLIA)-certified laboratory to perform the clinical validation of Rosetta Genomics’ diagnostics program for cancer of unknown primary.

In February 2006, Isis Pharmaceuticals Inc. and Rosetta Genomics said they would collaborate to develop antisense drugs that inhibit microRNA in the liver to treat cancers there. Antisense drugs are a class of compounds that interfere with genetic material that gets translated into harmful proteins.

== History ==
Rosetta Genomics was founded by Isaac Bentwich in 2000 to pursue commercial applications of microRNA research. The company had its IPO on March 6, 2007, and is traded on the NASDAQ. Rosetta Genomics expects the funds raised to advance its microRNA-based diagnostic and therapeutic cancer products through initial clinical validation, defined as success in identifying the specific biomarker panels via blinded tests of samples supplied by medical institutions.

In 2016, the company was ranked #27 on the Deloitte Fast 500 North America list.

In December 2017, the American diagnostics company Genoptix agreed to acquire Rosetta Genomics for $10 million. The agreement was terminated in February 2018 after it failed to receive the required shareholder vote. A second agreement, valuing the company at $9 million, was later approved by shareholders, but the merger was not completed.

On 31 May 2018, it was announced that Rosetta Genomics filed for Chapter 7 bankruptcy.
