= Lankenau Institute for Medical Research =

American nonprofit biomedical research institute

Coordinates: 39.98882°N 75.25613°W

- Established: 1927
- President and CEO: George C. Prendergast
- Address: Wynnewood, Pennsylvania
- Website: www.limr.org

Lankenau Institute for Medical Research (LIMR), founded in 1927, is a nonprofit, biomedical research institute located on the campus of Lankenau Medical Center in Wynnewood, Pennsylvania, serving as the research division of the Main Line Health system in suburban Philadelphia. LIMR focuses on studies of cancer, cardiovascular, autoimmune, gastrointestinal and other diseases.

== History ==
LIMR was one of the first U.S. research institutes to focus on cancer when it was founded in 1927. It was formerly known as the Lankenau Hospital Research Institute (LHRI) until 1980 and the Lankenau Medical Research Center (LMRC) from 1981-1999. Starting in 1941, LHRI also housed the Institute for Cancer Research (ICR), until the ICR was merged with the former American Oncology Hospital to create Fox Chase Cancer Center in 1974.

LHRI researcher David Hungerford is credited with the discovery of the first genetic abnormality in cancer, called the Philadelphia chromosome. It is detected in the vast majority of patients suffering from myelogenous leukemia. The first molecule-targeted drug to be created for cancer therapy, Gleevec (imatinib), acts by blocking this genetic abnormality.

LHRI researcher Baruch Blumberg is credited with the discovery of the hepatitis B virus and a blood test to detect it, as recognized by the 1976 Nobel Prize for Physiology or Medicine.

LIMR carried out research into the role of IDO (indoleamine 2,3-dioxygenase) in cancer, including the first experimental therapeutics to directly inhibit this enzyme, which modifies inflammatory processes in cancer, autoimmune disease, retinopathy, cardiovascular disease, and other disorders.

== Background ==
George C. Prendergast is the president and CEO of LIMR since 2004.
