= Peter Nowell =

American cancer researcher

- Born: February 8, 1928; Philadelphia, Pennsylvania
- Died: December 26, 2016 (aged 88); Philadelphia, Pennsylvania
- Education: Wesleyan University (B.A. 1948); University of Pennsylvania (M.D. 1952)
- Known for: Discovery of the Philadelphia chromosome
- Spouse: Helen Walker Worst (m. 1962; died 2004)
- Children: Timothy; Karen; Sharon; Kristin; Michael
- Awards: Lasker Award
- Scientific career
- Fields: Cancer research
- Workplaces: University of Pennsylvania

Peter Carey Nowell (February 8, 1928 – December 26, 2016) was a cancer researcher and co-discoverer of the Philadelphia chromosome. At the time of his death, he was the Gaylord P. and Mary Louise Harnwell Emeritus Professor of Pathology and Laboratory Medicine at the University of Pennsylvania.

== Biography ==
Peter Carey Nowell was born in Philadelphia. His mother was a writer and a teacher, and his father was an electrical engineer for the Bell Telephone Company.

He received a bachelor's degree in biology and chemistry from Wesleyan University in Middletown, Connecticut, in 1948 and a medical degree from the University of Pennsylvania in 1952. He joined the Navy, and during his tour he conducted research at the Naval Radiological Defense Laboratory in San Francisco. He joined the University of Pennsylvania faculty in 1956. At the time of his death, he was chairman of the department of pathology and laboratory medicine at Penn.

In 1952 Nowell married Helen Walker Worst. They had five children. His wife died in 2004.

Nowell died in Philadelphia, Pennsylvania.

== Discovery of the Philadelphia chromosome ==
Nowell credits his ultimate discovery of the so-called Philadelphia chromosome to an accident he made while cleaning a research slide. While working in a laboratory at UP studying samples of chronic myeloid leukemia, he happened to wash his slides with tap water instead of a laboratory solution. When he then studied the slides under his microscope, he saw that the water had caused the cells' chromosomes to expand. This was unusual, but since at that time chromosomes were not considered part of the cancer-causing puzzle, he could have disregarded the anomaly. Instead, he decided to investigate (he said later, "I didn’t know anything about chromosomes, but it seemed a shame to throw this away.")

He partnered with David Hungerford (1927-1993), a graduate student at the Fox Chase Cancer Center in Philadelphia. Analyzing the white blood cells of patients with this particular form of leukemia, Hungerford consistently noticed that the Chromosome 22 was noticeably short.

The finding was a turning point. Until then, most scientists believed viruses to be the cause of cancer. This new avenue of research fueled decades of scientific research that produced monumental steps in the treatment of cancer.

Gradually, technology improved enough to allow scientists to visualize the genetic material in greater detail. Janet D. Rowley, a University of Chicago researcher, determined the chromosome to result from a translocation, in which portions of two chromosomes exchange places, causing cells to turn malignant. Alfred G. Knudson Jr., a geneticist at Fox Chase, made further progress linking genetics and cancer.

In 1998, Nowell, Rowley and Knudson received Lasker Awards for their combined work in this area. At present, drugs have been developed that hold chronic myeloid leukemia in remission for years.

== University of Pennsylvania career ==
Nowell received his B.A. from Wesleyan University in 1948 and his M.D. from the University of Pennsylvania in 1952. He spent two years in the US Navy studying radiation and bone marrow transplantation and then returned to UPenn where he joined the faculty in 1956. He served as chair of the department of pathology from 1967-1973, and as the first director of the University of Pennsylvania Cancer Center, now known as the Abramson Cancer Center at the University of Pennsylvania.

In 1960, Nowell and his graduate student David Hungerford discovered the Philadelphia chromosome, an abnormally small chromosome in the cancerous white blood cells of patients with chronic myelogenous leukemia. This discovery was a critical step in showing that cancer has a genetic basis, contrary to a widespread belief at the time. This information made the development of imatinib and other targeted therapies possible. In the 1960s, he published that phytohemagglutinin was capable of triggering mitosis, which allowed scientists to grow cells in culture for the study for cancer.

== Awards ==
- 1976 Elected member of the National Academy of Sciences
- 1980 Simon M. Shubitz Cancer Prize and Lectureship
- 1986 Rous-Whipple Award of the American Society for Investigative Pathology
- 1987 de Villiers International Achievement Award of the Leukemia and Lymphoma Society
- 1991 Elected member of the Institute of Medicine
- 1993 Elected member of the American Philosophical Society
- 1989 Charles S. Mott Prize General Motors Cancer Research Foundation
- 1997 Gold-Headed Cane Award of the American Society for Investigative Pathology
- 1998 Lasker Award for Basic Medical Research
- 2009 Elected fellow of the American Academy of Arts and Sciences
- 2010 Benjamin Franklin Medal for Distinguished Achievement in the Sciences
- 2011 AACC-NACB award for outstanding contributions to clinical chemistry
- 2013 Albany Medical Center Prize in Medicine and Biomedical Research
- 2014 Elected fellow of the AACR Academy
