= Irwin Rose =

American biologist

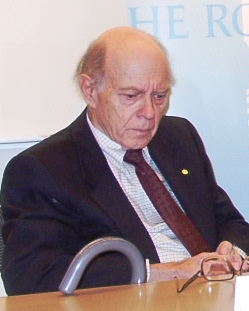
- Irwin Rose, c. 2000
- Born: Irwin Allan Rose; July 16, 1926; Brooklyn, New York, U.S.
- Died: June 2, 2015 (aged 88); Deerfield, Massachusetts, U.S.
- Education: University of Chicago (BS, PhD) NYU (postdoc)
- Known for: Ubiquitin-mediated protein degradation
- Spouse: Zelda Budenstein
- Children: 4
- Awards: Nobel Prize in Chemistry (2004)
- Scientific career
- Fields: Biology
- Workplaces: Fox Chase Cancer Center; University of Pennsylvania; University of California, Irvine; Yale University
- Thesis: Studies on the Biochemical Synthesis of Nucleic Acids (1952)
- Doctoral advisor: Bernard S. Schweigert

Irwin Allan Rose (July 16, 1926 – June 2, 2015) was an American biologist. Along with Aaron Ciechanover and Avram Hershko, he was awarded the 2004 Nobel Prize in Chemistry for the discovery of ubiquitin-mediated protein degradation.

== Education and early life ==
Rose was born in Brooklyn, New York, into a secular Jewish family, the son of Ella (Greenwald) and Harry Royze, who owned a flooring store. Rose attended Washington State University for one year prior to serving in the Navy during World War II. Upon returning from the war he received his Bachelor of Science degree in 1948 and his PhD in biochemistry in 1952, both from the University of Chicago. He did his post-doctoral studies at NYU.

== Career and research ==
Rose served on the faculty of Yale School of Medicine's department of biochemistry from 1954 to 1963. He then joined the Fox Chase Cancer Center in 1963 and stayed there until he retired in 1995. He joined University of Pennsylvania during the 1970s and served as a Professor of Physical Biochemistry. He was a distinguished professor-in-residence in the Department of Physiology and Biophysics at the University of California, Irvine School of Medicine at the time his Nobel Prize was announced in 2004.

Irwin (Ernie) trained several postdoctoral research fellows while at the Fox Chase Cancer Center in Philadelphia. These included Art Haas, the first to see Ubiquitin chains, Keith Wilkinson, the one to first identify APF-1 as Ubiquitin, and Cecile Pickart.

== Published work ==
When Irwin Rose started on his work on ubiquitin he was already distinguished as an enzymologist.

=== Classical enzymology ===
Only a selection of Rose's very extensive work in this field is mentioned here.

In collaboration with Marianne Grunberg-Manago, Saul Korey and Severo Ochoa he investigated the Mg^{2+}- or Mn^{2+}-dependent formation of acetyl-CoA from acetate and ATP catalyzed by acetate kinase, an essential reaction for priming the tricarboxylate cycle, describing the purification of the enzyme and measuring the equilibrium constant of the reaction.

With Edward O'Connell, Rose investigated the mechanisms of the reaction catalyzed by phosphoglucose isomerase and, with Sidney Rieder, of triose phosphate isomerase

With Jessie Warms, he studied the mechanism of hexokinase of sarcoma tumor, finding that it was located in the mitochondria of liver and brain, and bound in accord with a Mg^{2+}-dependent equilibrium.

He had a general interest in the role of magnesium in cells, and studied it on the basis of the equilibrium of the reaction catalyzed by adenylate kinase, a complicated question, because numerous complexes of Mg^{2+}, H^{+} and K^{+} with ATP, ADP and AMP need to be taken into account.

Starting from Ogston's theory, Rose was concerned with the stereochemistry of enzyme-catalysed reactions, investigating various enzymes, and later glutamine synthetase. This was the topic of a review article written with Kenneth Hanson.

=== Ubiquitin ===
After its discovery by Gideon Goldstein and colleagues in 1975, ubiquitin was extensively studied by Rose, with Avram Hershko, Aaron Ciechanover, A. L. Haas and H. Heller, one of many papers on the subject.

== Awards and honors ==
Rose was awarded the Nobel prize in 2004.

== Personal life ==
Rose was married to Zelda Budenstein and had four children. He died on June 2, 2015, at Deerfield, Massachusetts.

== See also ==
- List of Jewish Nobel laureates
