= Robert Briggs (scientist) =

- Born: December 10, 1911
- Died: March 4, 1983 (aged 71)
- Known for: Cloning a frog

Robert Briggs (December 10, 1911 — March 4, 1983) was a scientist who, in 1952, together with Thomas Joseph King, cloned a frog by nuclear transfer of embryonic cells. The same technique, using somatic cells, was later used to create Dolly the Sheep. Their experiment was the first successful nuclear transplantation performed in metazoans. He was a scientist at the Institute for Cancer Research of the Lankenau Hospital Research Institute (now known as the Lankenau Institute for Medical Research) when the work was conducted.

== Background ==
Upon the death of his mother when he was two years old, Briggs was raised by his grandparents in Epping, New Hampshire. Inspired by a high school science teacher, Briggs became interested in the biological sciences. However, he began Boston University in the business school, concerned with earning a living during the Depression. Business courses couldn’t maintain his interest and he turned to the sciences. He graduated from Boston University in 1934 with a BS degree and enrolled at Harvard for graduate study. He earned a PhD degree in 1938 while studying metabolism in frog embryos. For four years, he served as a fellow in the Department of Zoology at McGill University where he studied tumors in frogs. In 1942, he joined the Lankenau Hospital Research Institute (now the Fox Chase Cancer Center) in Philadelphia. He worked on amphibian embryos for the rest of his life.
