= Maureen Murphy (scientist) =

American cancer rearcher

Maureen E. Murphy is an American cancer researcher who works at The Wistar Institute in Philadelphia. Her research focuses on the tumor suppressor genes p53 and the cancer survivor protein HSP70. Previously, she was a faculty member at the Fox Chase Cancer Center from 1998 until relocating to The Wistar Institute in 2011. She is Deputy Director of the Ellen and Ronald Caplan Cancer Center there.

== Education and career ==
Murphy obtained her B.Sc. in biochemistry from Rutgers University in 1987 and her Ph.D. in Molecular Biology from the Perelman School of Medicine at the University of Pennsylvania in 1993. She performed her post-doctoral work in the lab of Arnold J. Levine at Princeton University (Levine discovered p53). She was a faculty member at the Fox Chase Cancer Center from 1998 until 2011 when she moved to The Wistar Institute.

=== Research ===
At Fox Chase Cancer Center, Murphy became an Assistant Professor and was promoted to Associate Professor in 2003 and Full Professor in 2011. She joined The Wistar Institute in 2011 and in 2012 she was named Program Leader of the Molecular and Cellular Oncogenesis Program. She is also an adjunct professor at Drexel University College of Medicine and The Perelman School of Medicine at the University of Pennsylvania.

Murphy's research on p53 has focused on various genetic polymorphisms, or genetic variants, of p53 that exist in different populations, and which impair the ability of p53 to suppress cancer in those populations. In particular, her laboratory works on the P47S (Pro47Ser) and Y107H (Tyr107His) variants that exist in African-descent populations, and on the G334R (Gly334Arg) variant that exists in individuals of Ashkenazi Jewish descent. Using human cell lines and mouse models for these variants, her research indicates that these variants predispose to cancer risk. Murphy has also discovered anti-cancer agents that preferentially destroy tumors containing these variants in a personalized medicine approach. In addition, her research provides a possible explanation as to why certain types of cancer affect certain populations.

=== Memberships and affiliations ===
Murphy serves on the international committee of the International p53 Workshop and was co-chair of the workshop in 2010.

== Select publications ==
- Powers J, Pinto EM, Barnoud T, Leung JC, Martynyuk T, Kossenkov AV, Philips AH, Desai H, Hausler R, Kelly G, Le AN, Li MM, MacFarland SP, Pyle LC, Zelley K, Nathanson KL, Domchek SM, Slavin TP, Weitzel JN, Stopfer JE, Garber JE, Joseph V, Offit K, Dolinsky JS, Gutierrez S, McGoldrick K, Couch FJ, Levin B, Edelman MC, Levy CF, Spunt SL, Kriwacki RW, Zambetti GP, Ribeiro RC, Murphy ME, Maxwell KN (September 2020). "A Rare TP53 Mutation Predominant in Ashkenazi Jews Confers Risk of Multiple Cancers". Cancer Research. 80 (17): 3732–3744. doi:10.1158/0008-5472.CAN-20-1390. PMC 7484045. PMID 32675277.
- Singh KS, Leu JI, Barnoud T, Vonteddu P, Gnanapradeepan K, Lin C, Liu Q, Barton JC, Kossenkov AV, George DL, Murphy ME, Dotiwala F (January 2020). "African-centric TP53 variant increases iron accumulation and bacterial pathogenesis but improves response to malaria toxin". Nature Communications. 11 (1): 473. doi:10.1038/s41467-019-14151-9. PMC 6981190. PMID 31980600.
- Leu JI, Murphy ME, George DL (April 2019). "Mechanistic basis for impaired ferroptosis in cells expressing the African-centric S47 variant of p53". Proceedings of the National Academy of Sciences of the United States of America. 116 (17): 8390–8396. doi:10.1073/pnas.1821277116. PMC 6486733. PMID 30962386.
- Barnoud T, Budina-Kolomets A, Basu S, Leu JI, Good M, Kung CP, Liu J, Liu Q, Villanueva J, Zhang R, George DL, Murphy ME (October 2018). "Tailoring Chemotherapy for the African-Centric S47 Variant of TP53". Cancer Research. 78 (19): 5694–5705. doi:10.1158/0008-5472.CAN-18-1327. PMC 6168343. PMID 30115697.
- Murphy ME, Liu S, Yao S, Huo D, Liu Q, Dolfi SC, Hirshfield KM, Hong CC, Hu Q, Olshan AF, Ogundiran TO, Adebamowo C, Domchek SM, Nathanson KL, Nemesure B, Ambs S, Blot WJ, Feng Y, John EM, Bernstein L, Zheng W, Hu JJ, Ziegler RG, Nyante S, Ingles SA, Press MF, Deming SL, Rodriguez-Gil JL, Haiman CA, Olopade OI, Lunetta KL, Palmer JR, Ambrosone CB (2017). "A functionally significant SNP in TP53 and breast cancer risk in African-American women". npj Breast Cancer. 3: 5. doi:10.1038/s41523-017-0007-9. PMC 5445618. PMID 28649645.
- Azzam GA, Wang X, Bell DA and Murphy ME. CSF1 is a novel p53 target gene whose protein product functions in a feed-forward manner to suppress apoptosis and enhance p53-mediated growth arrest. PLoS One, in press.
- Budina-Kolomets A, Hontz RD, Pimkina J, Murphy ME. A conserved domain in exon 2 coding for the human and murine ARF tumor suppressor protein is required for autophagy induction. Autophagy 2013; Aug 7;9(10).
- Murphy ME. The HSP70 family and cancer. Carcinogenesis 2013; 34(6):1181-8.
- Balaburski GM, Leu JI, Beeharry N, Hayik S, Andrake MD, Zhang G, Herlyn M, Villanueva J, Dunbrack RL Jr, Yen T, George DL, Murphy ME. A modified HSP70 inhibitor shows broad activity as an anticancer agent. Mol Cancer Res 2013;11(3):219-29.
- Leu JI, Pimkina J, Pandey P, Murphy ME, George DL. HSP70 inhibition by the small-molecule 2-phenylethynesulfonamide impairs protein clearance pathways in tumor cells. Mol Cancer Res. 2011; 9:936-47.
