= Hepatitis B Foundation =

American nonprofit organization

The Hepatitis B Foundation
- Abbreviation: HBF
- Formation: 1991
- Founder: Joan and Tim Block
- Type: non profit
- Purpose: cure for hepatitis B
- Website: www.hepb.org

The Hepatitis B Foundation (HBF) is an American nonprofit organization dedicated to finding a cure for hepatitis B and improving the lives of those already affected by the disease. The foundation conducts biomedical research, promotes disease awareness, and acts as an information source for patients, the medical community, and the general public.

Established in 1991, the foundation's headquarters is in Doylestown, Pennsylvania. It is the world's only nonprofit focused solely on hepatitis B. The Hepatitis B Foundation's research arm, the Baruch S. Blumberg Institute, has the largest number of nonprofit scientists dedicated to hepatitis B research in the world.

The organization also leads national public policy initiatives and international public health programs.

== History ==
The Hepatitis B Foundation was established in 1991 by Joan and Tim Block. After Joan was diagnosed with hepatitis B at the age of 29, she and Tim encountered a lack of support and few resources to cope with the new diagnosis. To meet the unmet needs of those living with chronic hepatitis B, they created the Hepatitis B Foundation with the help of the other co-founders, Janine and Paul Witte. Tim Block, a professor of virology at Thomas Jefferson University at the time, switched his research focus from herpesviridae to hepatitis B. He reached out to Baruch S. Blumberg, Nobel Prize winner and discoverer of the hepatitis B virus, who invited Block to join him as a research fellow at Oxford University. Blumberg ultimately became a founding member of the Hepatitis B Foundation's research arm.

Joan Block served as executive director until retiring in 2017. Tim served as president until 2022, until Chari A. Cohen, DrPH, MPH, took over the role. Tim was president of the foundation's research arm, the Baruch S. Blumberg Institute, until 2022.

== Operations ==
The Hepatitis B Foundation is a nonprofit organization that provides resources and information about hepatitis B, engages in public health outreach campaigns, and leads public policy initiatives. Their website acts as a resource for patients, the medical community, and general public to learn about the diagnosis and treatment of hepatitis B. Patient-centered support groups and trained counselors can be found on their website.

For the medical community, the Hepatitis B Foundation organizes the International HBV Scientific Meeting annually for scientists discuss to new discoveries in hepatitis B research. The organization is also actively involved in policy-making, helping ensure hepatitis B is a health priority at the local and federal level.

The Baruch S. Blumberg Institute was established in 2003 by the Hepatitis B Foundation to conduct focused biomedical research on hepatitis B. Originally known as the Institute of Hepatitis and Virus Research, it was renamed in 2013 to honor its late co-founder and discoverer of the hepatitis B virus, Baruch S. Blumberg.

In 2006, the Hepatitis B Foundation opened its first research facility on Delaware Valley College's campus to house the Baruch S. Blumberg Institute. This research facility was recognized by the state as a Pennsylvania Keystone Innovation Zone. The same year, the foundation built a research center to accommodate its expanding activities. This new center, called the Pennsylvania Biotechnology Center, presently acts as the headquarters for the Hepatitis B Foundation and Baruch S. Blumberg Institute. The Hepatitis B Foundation's biotechnology center has created over 700 jobs and brought in more than $1.8 billion to the Bucks County economic region between 2013 and 2015.

In 2017, the foundation secured a $13 million grant to expand its Pennsylvania Biotechnology Center by 47,000 square feet, added 100 new jobs to its research facility. Each year, the Hepatitis B Foundation awards the Baruch S. Blumberg Prize for contributions to hepatitis research.

The foundation partnered with HepVu and the National Viral Hepatitis Roundtable to conduct research on the consequences of delaying the HBV vaccine at birth. In December 2025 the findings from the study were shared with the public. The data showed that even with small delays in the vaccine will lead to substantially more infections. A week prior, the United States CDC's advisory committee announced they would soon be voting on whether or not to eliminate or delay the newborn dose.
