= Avram Hershko =

Hungarian-Israeli biochemist

- אברהם הרשקו
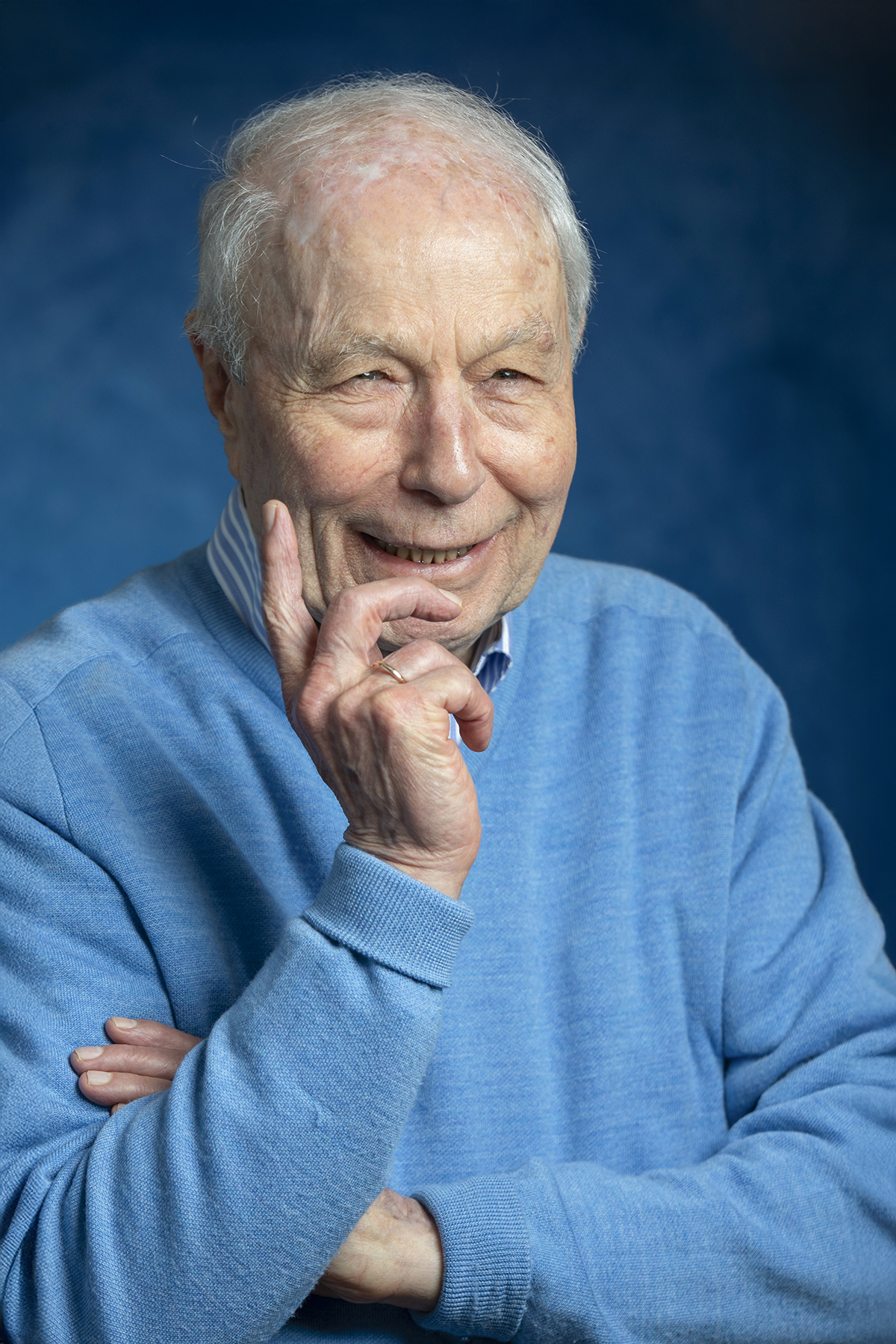
- Hershko in 2023
- Born: Herskó Ferenc Ábrahám; 31 December 1937 (age 88); Karcag, Hungary
- Education: Hebrew University of Jerusalem
- Known for: Ubiquitin-mediated protein degradation
- Spouse: Judith Leibowitz (m. 1963)
- Children: 3
- Awards: Louisa Gross Horwitz Prize (2001); Wolf Prize in Medicine (2001); Nobel Prize in Chemistry (2004)
- Scientific career
- Fields: Chemistry
- Workplaces: Technion, Haifa

Avram Hershko (Hebrew: אברהם הרשקו, romanized: Avraham Hershko, Hungarian: Herskó Ferenc Ábrahám; born December 31, 1937) is a Hungarian-born Israeli biochemist who received the Nobel Prize in Chemistry in 2004.

== Biography ==
He was born Herskó Ferenc in Karcag, Hungary, into a Jewish family, the son of Shoshana/Margit 'Manci' (née Wulc) and Moshe Hershko, both teachers. During the Second World War, his father was forced into labor service in the Hungarian army and then taken as a prisoner by the Soviet Army. For years, Avram's family didn't know anything about what had happened to his father. Avram, his mother and older brother Chaim/Laszlo 'Laci' were put in a ghetto in Szolnok. During the final days of the ghetto, most Jews were sent to be murdered in Auschwitz, but Avram and his family managed to board trains that took them to a concentration camp in Austria, where they were forced into labor until the end of the war. Avram and his mother and brother survived the war and returned to their home. His father returned as well, 4 years after they had last seen him.

Hershko and his family emigrated to Israel in 1950 and settled in Jerusalem. He received his MD in 1965 and his PhD in 1969 from the Hebrew University of Jerusalem-Hadassah Medical Center. He was a postdoctoral scholar at the University of California, San Francisco. He is currently a Distinguished Professor at the Rappaport Faculty of Medicine at the Technion in Haifa and a Distinguished Adjunct Professor at the New York University Grossman School of Medicine.

Along with Aaron Ciechanover and Irwin Rose, he was awarded the 2004 Nobel Prize in Chemistry for the discovery of ubiquitin-mediated protein degradation. The ubiquitin-proteasome system has a critical role in maintaining the homeostasis of cells and is believed to be involved in the development and progression of diseases such as cancer, muscular and neurological diseases, and immune and inflammatory responses.

His contributions to science directly helped cure one of his long-time friends of cancer.

== Honours and awards ==
- 1987 – Weizmann Prize for Sciences
- 1994 – Israel Prize in Biochemistry
- 1999 – Canada Gairdner International Award (with Alexander Varshavsky)
- 2000 – Albert Lasker Award for Basic Medical Research (with Aaron Ciechanover and Varshavsky)
- 2000 – Alfred P. Sloan Jr. Prize (with Varshavsky)
- 2000 – Member, Israel Academy of Sciences and Humanities
- 2001 – Louisa Gross Horwitz Prize from Columbia University (with Varshavsky)
- 2001 – Massry Prize from the Keck School of Medicine of USC, University of Southern California (with Varshavsky)
- 2001 – Wolf Prize in Medicine (with Varshavsky) for "the discovery of the ubiquitin system of intracellular protein degradation and the crucial functions of this system in cellular regulation."
- 2002 – The EMET Prize for Art, Science and Culture in the category of Life Sciences (with Ciechanover and Leo Sachs)
- 2002 – E.B. Wilson Medal (with Varshavsky)
- 2003 – Foreign Associate, National Academy of Sciences, USA
- 2004 – Nobel Prize in Chemistry for his discovery with Ciechanover and Irwin Rose, of ubiquitin-mediated protein degradation
- 2005 – Elected to the American Philosophical Society

== Publications ==
- Hershko, A.; Ciechanover, A.; Heller, H.; Haas, A. L.; Rose, I. A. (April 1, 1980). "Proposed role of ATP in protein breakdown: conjugation of protein with multiple chains of the polypeptide of ATP-dependent proteolysis". Proceedings of the National Academy of Sciences. 77 (4): 1783–1786. Bibcode:1980PNAS...77.1783H. doi:10.1073/pnas.77.4.1783. ISSN 0027-8424. PMC 348591. PMID 6990414.
- Hershko, A; Heller, H; Elias, S; Ciechanover, A (July 10, 1983). "Components of ubiquitin-protein ligase system. Resolution, affinity purification, and role in protein breakdown". The Journal of Biological Chemistry. 258 (13): 8206–14. doi:10.1016/S0021-9258(20)82050-X. ISSN 0021-9258. PMID 6305978.
- Hershko, A.; Leshinsky, E.; Ganoth, D.; Heller, H. (March 1, 1984). "ATP-dependent degradation of ubiquitin-protein conjugates". Proceedings of the National Academy of Sciences. 81 (6): 1619–1623. Bibcode:1984PNAS...81.1619H. doi:10.1073/pnas.81.6.1619. ISSN 0027-8424. PMC 344969. PMID 6324208.
- Hershko, A; Heller, H; Eytan, E; Reiss, Y (1986). "The protein substrate binding site of the ubiquitin-protein ligase system". Journal of Biological Chemistry. 261 (26). Elsevier BV: 11992–11999. doi:10.1016/s0021-9258(18)67192-3. ISSN 0021-9258. PMID 3017957.
- Ganoth, D; Leshinsky, E; Eytan, E; Hershko, A (September 5, 1988). "A multicomponent system that degrades proteins conjugated to ubiquitin. Resolution of factors and evidence for ATP-dependent complex formation". The Journal of Biological Chemistry. 263 (25): 12412–9. doi:10.1016/S0021-9258(18)37771-8. ISSN 0021-9258. PMID 2842333.
- Sudakin, V; Ganoth, D; Dahan, A; Heller, H; Hershko, J; Luca, F C; Ruderman, J V; Hershko, A (1995). "The cyclosome, a large complex containing cyclin-selective ubiquitin ligase activity, targets cyclins for destruction at the end of mitosis". Molecular Biology of the Cell. 6 (2). American Society for Cell Biology (ASCB): 185–197. doi:10.1091/mbc.6.2.185. ISSN 1059-1524. PMC 275828. PMID 7787245.

== Involvement with biotechnology ==
Hershko serves on the Scientific Advisory Board of Oramed Pharmaceuticals.

== See also ==
- List of Israel Prize recipients
- List of Israeli Nobel laureates
- List of Jewish Nobel laureates
- Science and technology in Israel
- Raz Hershko (born 1998), Israeli European champion and Olympic judoka
