= David Hungerford =

American cancer researcher

- Born: 1927; Brockton, Massachusetts
- Died: November 3, 1993 aged about 66; Jenkintown, Pennsylvania
- Education: Temple University, Philadelphia, University of Pennsylvania (PhD 1961)
- Known for: Discovery of the Philadelphia chromosome
- Scientific career
- Fields: Cancer research

David A. Hungerford (1927–1993) was an American cancer researcher and co-discoverer of the Philadelphia chromosome. This discovery was the first association between a genetic abnormality and a type of cancer, and it changed the direction of cancer research and paved the way for the development of targeted cancer therapies.

== Education and early career ==
David A. Hungerford was born in Brockton, Massachusetts in 1927. He received his bachelor's degree from Temple University in Philadelphia, and earned a PhD in zoology from the University of Pennsylvania.

In 1959, while working as a junior research fellow at the Lankenau Hospital's Institute for Cancer Research in Philadelphia (later merged with the American Oncology Hospital to create Fox Chase Cancer Center), Hungerford and Peter Nowell, a pathologist at the University of Pennsylvania School of Medicine, discovered what became known as the Philadelphia chromosome.

After earning his PhD in 1961, he spent more than two decades as a researcher, first at the Institute for Cancer Research and then later at Fox Chase after its creation in 1974. He retired from Fox Chase in 1982 due to the effects of multiple sclerosis.

Hungerford died on November 3, 1993, of lung cancer, at home in Jenkintown, Pennsylvania. His widow, Alice Hungerford, was also a longtime Fox Chase Cancer Center employee. She maintains his legacy and the family's connection with Fox Chase via the David A. Hungerford Endowed Fund in Basic Chromosome Research. Every September she used to host an event to raise money for the endowment.

The microscope Hungerford was using when he made his discovery is on permanent public display at Fox Chase.

== Discovery of the Philadelphia chromosome ==
At the time of discovery Hungerford was pursuing his PhD, and was studying leukemia cells for a dissertation on human chromosomes. He detected a tiny abnormality in the chromosomes from cultured blood cells taken from two patients with chronic myelogenous leukemia (CML). This abnormality would turn out to be the first consistent genetic irregularity associated with cancer in humans. Part of chromosome 22, and thus some of the genetic code it carried, appeared to be missing. Hungerford and Nowell postulated that a cell was not viable with the loss of that much genetic material. They believed that it was possibly a translocation, meaning the missing piece was attached in a different spot on the chromosome, but they couldn't prove it using the techniques available at the time. In the early 1970s, Janet Rowley confirmed that it was a translocation.

The discovery was called the Philadelphia chromosome after the city in which the researchers' respective institutions were located. They presented their findings in the Journal of National Cancer Institute in 1960. At the time, techniques for preparing chromosomes for microscopic study were still crude, and researchers had found no abnormal chromosomes in cells from patients with CML. Further studies verified the findings.

== Other scientific contributions ==
Prior to the introduction of banding techniques on somatic metaphase chromosomes, David began investigating chromosomes at the pachytene stage in the development of sperm. Each chromosome has a specific, innate banding pattern (later shown to correlate to the banding pattern of somatic metaphase chromosomes), and in 1970 he described how the trisomy mutation associated with Down syndrome developed in meiosis. At the time of his retirement due to illness in 1982, David had mapped almost half of the normal human complement of chromosomes at pachytene.
