= Thomas Joseph King =

American biologist (1921–2000)

Thomas J. King
- Born: June 4, 1921
- Died: October 25, 2000 (aged 79)

Thomas J. King (June 4, 1921 – October 25, 2000) was an American biologist.

== Biography ==
With Robert William Briggs, he worked on transplantation of somatic cell nuclei from adult frogs into enucleated oocytes this leading to the first clone of an animal in 1952. He was a scientist at the Institute for Cancer Research of the Lankenau Hospital Research Institute (now known as Lankenau Institute for Medical Research) when the work was conducted. King and Briggs were awarded in 1972 the highest honor of the French Academy: the Grand Prix Charles-Leopold Mayer of the Académie des Sciences, Institut de France and were the first Americans to be so honored.
