= Baruch Samuel Blumberg =

American doctor (1925–2011)

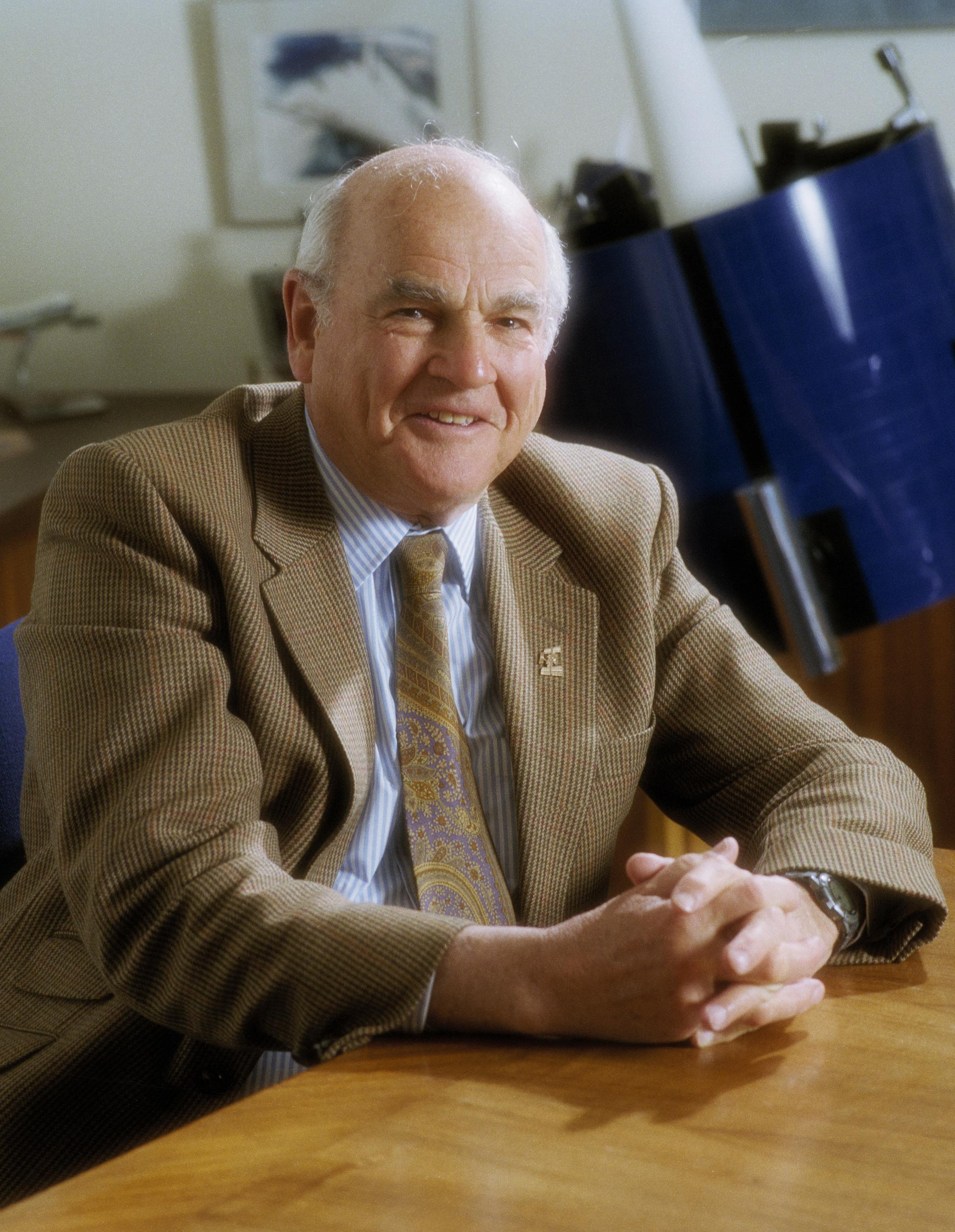
- Blumberg in 1999
- Born: July 28, 1925; Brooklyn, New York City, U.S.
- Died: April 5, 2011 (aged 85); Mountain View, California, U.S.
- Education: Union College, New York (BA); Balliol College, Oxford (DPhil); Columbia University (MD)
- Known for: Hepatitis B vaccine
- Spouse: Jean Liebesman (m. 1954)
- Children: 4
- Awards: Nobel Prize in Medicine (1976)
- Scientific career
- Fields: Biochemistry, physiology
- Workplaces: Columbia Presbyterian Medical Center; Fox Chase Cancer Center; University of Pennsylvania; NASA Astrobiology Institute; Library of Congress

Pennsylvania Historical Marker
- Official name: Baruch S. Blumberg (1925–2001)
- Designated: September 24, 2016

Baruch Samuel Blumberg (July 28, 1925 – April 5, 2011), known as Barry Blumberg, was an American physician, geneticist, and co-recipient of the 1976 Nobel Prize in Physiology or Medicine (with Daniel Carleton Gajdusek), for his work on the hepatitis B virus while an investigator at the NIH and at the Fox Chase Cancer Center. He was president of the American Philosophical Society from 2005 until his death.

Blumberg and Gajdusek received the Nobel Prize for discovering "new mechanisms for the origin and dissemination of infectious diseases." Blumberg identified the hepatitis B virus, and later developed its diagnostic test and vaccine.

== Biography ==
=== Early life and education ===
Blumberg was born in Brooklyn, New York, into a Jewish family, the son of Ida (Simonoff) and Meyer Blumberg, a lawyer. He first attended the Orthodox Yeshivah of Flatbush for elementary school, where–in addition to all regular school subjects–he learned to read and write in Hebrew, and to study the Bible and Jewish texts in their original language. (That school also had among its students a contemporary of Blumberg, Eric Kandel, who is another recipient of the Nobel Prize in medicine.) Blumberg then attended Brooklyn's James Madison High School, a school that Blumberg described as having high academic standards, including many teachers with Ph.D.s. After moving to Far Rockaway, Queens, he transferred to Far Rockaway High School in the early 1940s, a school that also produced fellow laureates Burton Richter and Richard Feynman. Blumberg served as a U.S. Navy deck officer during World War II. He then attended Union College in Schenectady, New York, and graduated from there with honors in 1946.

Originally entering the graduate program in mathematics at Columbia University, Blumberg switched to medicine and enrolled at Columbia's College of Physicians and Surgeons, from which he received his MD in 1951. He remained at Columbia Presbyterian Medical Center for the next four years, first as an intern and then as a resident. He then moved to the University of Oxford and began graduate work in biochemistry at Balliol College, Oxford, and earned his DPhil there in 1957. He later became the first American to be master at Balliol College, Oxford.

=== Scientific career ===
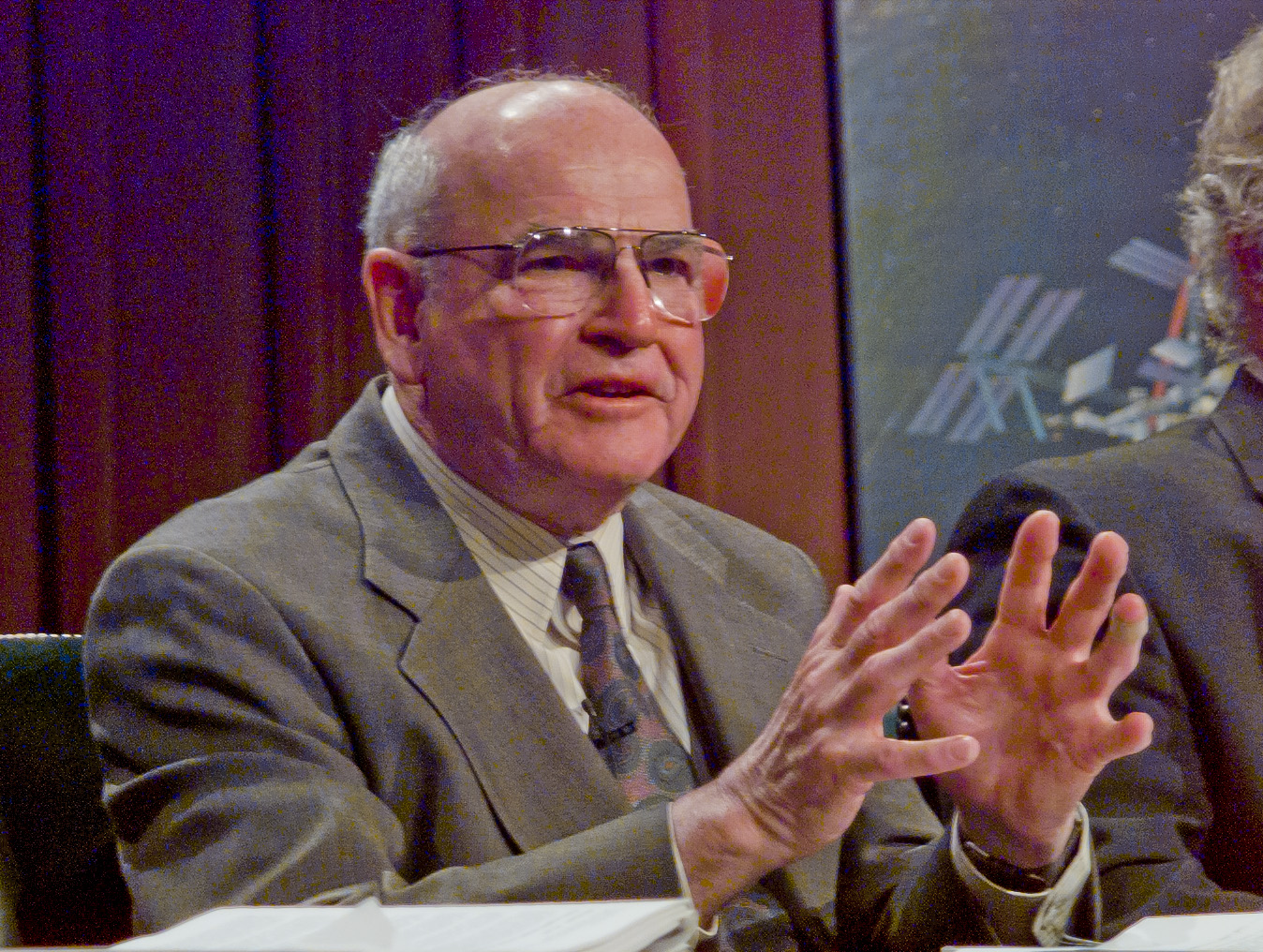
1999 press conference at which Blumberg was introduced as the first director of the NASA Astrobiology Institute

Throughout the 1950s, Blumberg traveled the world taking human blood samples, to study the genetic variations in human beings, focusing on the question of why some people contract a disease in a given environment, while others do not. In 1964, while studying "yellow jaundice" (hepatitis), he discovered a surface antigen for hepatitis B in the blood of an Australian aborigine, hence initially called the 'Australian antigen'. Blumberg's colleague, Alton Sutnick, found that it was acquired and associated with inflammatory disease of the liver, drawing “the first formal connection between the mysterious antigen and hepatitis” recognizing that the antigen was likely part of a hepatitis virus. Blumberg's work later demonstrated that the virus could cause liver cancer. Blumberg and his team were able to develop a screening test for the hepatitis B virus, to prevent its spread in blood donations, and developed a vaccine. Blumberg later freely distributed his vaccine patent in order to promote its distribution by drug companies. Deployment of the vaccine reduced the infection rate of hepatitis B in children in China from 15% to 1% in 10 years.

In 1964, Blumberg became a member of the Institute of Cancer Research (ICR) of the Lankenau Hospital Research Institute in Philadelphia, known today as the Lankenau Institute for Medical Research (LIMR), which later joined the Fox Chase Cancer Center in 1974, and he held the rank of University Professor of Medicine and Anthropology at the University of Pennsylvania starting in 1977. Concurrently, he was Master of Balliol College from 1989 to 1994. He was elected a Fellow of the American Academy of Arts and Sciences in 1994. From 1999 to 2002, he was also director of the NASA Astrobiology Institute at the Ames Research Center in Moffett Field, California.

In 1992, Blumberg participated in the founding of the Hepatitis B Foundation (HBF), a nonprofit organization dedicated to finding a cure for hepatitis B and improving the lives of those affected by hepatitis B worldwide. He served on the Scientific and Medical Advisory Board, and as its distinguished scholar from 1992 until his death in 2011. Blumberg was a regular and inspirational presence at the Hepatitis Foundation, maintaining an office at the foundation in Doylestown, Pennsylvania.

In 2000, Blumberg received the Golden Plate Award of the American Academy of Achievement. In 2001, Blumberg was named to the Library of Congress Scholars Council, a body of distinguished scholars that advises the Librarian of Congress. Blumberg served on the council until his death.

In November 2004, Blumberg was named chairman of the scientific advisory board of United Therapeutics Corporation, a position he held until his death. As chairman, he convened three "Conference[s] on Nanomedical and Telemedical Technology", as well as guiding the biotechnology company in the development of a broad-spectrum anti-viral medicine.

Beginning in 2005, Blumberg also served as the president of the American Philosophical Society. He had first been elected to membership in the society in 1986.

In October 2010, Blumberg participated in the USA Science and Engineering Festival's Lunch with a Laureate program, in which middle and high school students of the Greater Washington, D.C., Northern Virginia and Maryland area got to engage in an informal conversation with a Nobel Prize–winning scientist over a brown-bag lunch.

In discussing the factors that influenced his life, Blumberg always gave credit to the mental discipline of the Jewish Talmud, and as often as possible, he attended weekly Talmud discussion classes until his death.

=== Bioethics ===
Blumberg devoted his 1976 Nobel lecture to the subject of bioethics. He predicted the discovery of the Hepatitis B chronic carrier state would lead to calls for exclusion and quarantine of chronic carriers and the denial of health care. Blumberg came down solidly on the side of liberty and stated it was better not to test for the condition in medical practice. The following year, the teachers' union in New York City moved to exclude chronic carriers from the New York school system. At the time, a number of developmentally disabled children who had been institutionalized at Willowbrook were being mainstreamed into the public schools. As part of the Willowbrook hepatitis experiments, most children had been involuntarily tested and over 50 chronic carriers had been identified. The New York Public Health department convened a panel to decide policy led by Saul Krugman; however, Blumberg with his open views, was notably excluded. The panel and school system decided to exclude all known Hepatitis B carriers from school attendance and impose compulsory blood testing on all their classmates without informed consent about the nature of the blood tests. Litigation on behalf of the excluded children reversed the policy, and Blumberg advised the excluded children's lawyers. This set important precedent for the AIDS era.

In an interview with The New York Times in 2002 he stated that "[Saving lives] is what drew me to medicine. There is, in Jewish thought, this idea that if you save a single life, you save the whole world".

=== Death ===
Blumberg died on April 5, 2011, shortly after giving the keynote speech at the International Lunar Research Park Exploratory Workshop held at NASA Ames Research Center. At the time of his death Blumberg was a distinguished scientist at the NASA Lunar Science Institute, located at the NASA Ames Research Center in Moffett Field, California.

Jonathan Chernoff, the scientific director at the Fox Chase Cancer Center where Blumberg spent most of his working life said, "I think it's fair to say that Barry prevented more cancer deaths than any person who's ever lived." In reference to Blumberg's discovery of the Hepatitis B vaccine, former NASA administrator Daniel Goldin said, "Our planet is an improved place as a result of Barry's few short days in residence."

In 2011, the Library of Congress and National Aeronautics and Space Administration (NASA) announced the establishment of the Baruch S. Blumberg NASA/Library of Congress Chair in Astrobiology, a research position housed within the library's John W. Kluge Center, which explores the effects of astrobiology research on society. The chair was named for Blumberg in recognition of his service to the Library of Congress Scholars Council, and his commitment to "research and dialogue between disciplines."

In 2011, in recognition of Blumberg's long professional and personal association with the department of biochemistry and the Glycobiology Institute, Oxford University established the Baruch Blumberg Professorship in Virology.

=== Manuscript collection ===
The Baruch S. Blumberg papers are held at the American Philosophical Society in Philadelphia, PA. The collection contains 458 linear feet of materials documenting his life and career.

== See also ==
- List of Jewish Nobel laureates
- World Hepatitis Day

Academic offices
Preceded by Anthony Kenny	Master of Balliol College, Oxford; 1989–1994	Succeeded by Colin Lucas
