= Canada Gairdner International Award =

Biomedical award

- Awarded for: Outstanding discoveries or contributions to medical science
- Country: Canada
- Presented by: Gairdner Foundation
- First award: 1959
- Website: http://www.gairdner.org/

The Canada Gairdner International Award is given annually by the Gairdner Foundation at a special dinner to five individuals for outstanding discoveries or contributions to medical science. Receipt of the Gairdner is traditionally considered a precursor to winning the Nobel Prize in Medicine; as of 2020, 98 Nobel Prizes have been awarded to prior Gairdner recipients.

Canada Gairdner International Awards are given annually in the amount of $100,000 (each) payable in Canadian funds and can be awarded to residents of any country in the world. A joint award may be given for the same discovery or contribution to medical science, but in that case each awardee receives a full prize.

== Past winners ==
- 1959 Alfred Blalock, Charles Ragan, Harry M. Rose, William D.M. Paton, Eleanor Zaimis, Wilfred G. Bigelow
- 1960 Joshua Harold Burn, John H. Gibbon Jr., William F. Hamilton, John McMichael, Karl Meyer, Arnold Rice Rich
- 1961 Russell Brock, Alan C. Burton, Alexander B. Gutman, Jonas H. Kellgren, Ulf S. von Euler
- 1962 Francis H.C. Crick, Albert H. Coons, Clarence Crafoord, Henry G. Kunkel, Stanley J. Sarnoff
- 1963 Murray L. Barr, Jacques Genest, Irvine H. Page, Pierre Grabar, C. Walton Lillehei, Eric G.L. Bywaters
- 1964 Seymour Benzer, Karl H. Beyer Jr., Deborah Doniach, Ivan M. Roitt, Gordon D.W. Murray, Keith R. Porter
- 1965 Jerome W. Conn, Robin Coombs, Charles Enrique Dent, Charles Philippe Leblond, Daniel J. McCarty, Horace Smirk
- 1966 Rodney R. Porter, Geoffrey S. Dawes, Charles B. Huggins, Willem J. Kolff, Luis F. Leloir, Jacques Miller, Jan Waldenström
- 1967 Christian DeDuve, Marshall W. Nirenberg, George E. Palade, Julius Axelrod, Sidney Udenfriend, D. Harold Copp, Iain Macintyre, Peter Joseph Moloney, J. Fraser Mustard
- 1968 Bruce Chown, James L. Gowans, George H. Hitchings, Jacques Oudin, J. Edwin Seegmiller
- 1969 Frank J. Dixon, John P. Merrill, Belding H. Scribner, Robert B. Salter, Earl W. Sutherland, Ernest A. McCulloch, F. Mason Sones, James E. Till
- 1970 Vincent P. Dole, W. Richard S. Doll, Robert A. Good, Niels K. Jerne, Robert B. Merrifield
- 1971 Charles Best, Rachmiel Levine, Frederick Sanger, Donald F. Steiner, Solomon A. Berson, Rosalyn S. Yalow
- 1972 Sune Bergström, Britton Chance, Oleh Hornykiewicz, Robert Russell Race, Ruth Sanger
- 1973 Roscoe O. Brady, Denis P. Burkitt, John Charnley, Kimishige Ishizaka, Teruko Ishizaka, Harold E. Johns
- 1974 David Baltimore, Howard M. Temin, Hector F. DeLuca, Roger Guillemin, Andrew V. Schally, Hans J. Müller-Eberhard, Juda Quastel
- 1975 Ernest Beutler, Baruch S. Blumberg, Henri G. Hers, Hugh E. Huxley, John D. Keith, William Thornton Mustard
- 1976 Sir Godfrey N. Hounsfield, Thomas R. Dawber, William B. Kannel, Eugene P. Kennedy, George Klein, George D. Snell
- 1977 K. Frank Austen, Cyril A. Clarke, Jean Dausset, Henry G. Friesen, Victor A. McKusick
- 1978 Sydney Brenner, Jean-Pierre Changeux, Donald S. Fredrickson, Samuel O. Freedman, Phil Gold, Edwin G. Krebs, Elizabeth C. Miller, James A. Miller (de), Lars Terenius (de)
- 1979 Sir James W. Black, George F. Cahill Jr., Walter Gilbert, Elwood V. Jensen, Frederick Sanger, Charles R. Scriver
- 1980 Paul Berg, Irving B. Fritz, H. Gobind Khorana, Efraim Racker, Jesse Roth, Michael Sela
- 1981 Michael S. Brown, Joseph L. Goldstein, Wai Yiu Cheung, Jerry H.-C. Wang, Georges J. Köhler, César Milstein, Elizabeth F. Neufeld, Saul Roseman, Bengt Samuelsson
- 1982 Gilbert Ashwell, Günter Blobel, Arvid Carlsson, Paul Janssen, Manfred M. Mayer
- 1983 Donald A. Henderson, Bruce N. Ames, Gerald D. Aurbach, John A. Clements, Richard K. Gershon, Susumu Tonegawa
- 1984 J. Michael Bishop, Harold E. Varmus, Alfred G. Gilman, Martin Rodbell, Yuet Wai Kan, Kresimir Krnjevic, Robert L. Noble
- 1985 Stanley Cohen, Paul C. Lauterbur, Raymond U. Lemieux, Mary F. Lyon, Mark Ptashne, Charles Yanofsky
- 1986 Jean-Francois Borel, James E. Darnell, Philip A. Sharp, Adolfo J. de Bold, T. Geoffrey Flynn, Harald Sonnenberg, Peter C. Doherty, Rolf M. Zinkernagel, Michael Smith
- 1987 René G. Favaloro, Robert C. Gallo, Luc Montagnier, Walter J. Gehring, Edward B. Lewis, Eric R. Kandel, Michael G. Rossmann
- 1988 Albert J. Aguayo, Michael J. Berridge, Yasutomi Nishizuka, Thomas R. Cech, Michael A. Epstein, Robert J. Lefkowitz
- 1989 Mark M. Davis, Tak W. Mak, Jean-Marie Ghuysen, Louis M. Kunkel, Ronald G. Worton, Erwin Neher, Bert Sakmann
- 1990 Francis S. Collins, John R. Riordan, Lap-Chee Tsui, Victor Ling, Oliver Smithies, Edwin M. Southern, E. Donnall Thomas
- 1991 Sydney Brenner, John E. Sulston, M. Judah Folkman, Robert F. Furchgott, David H. MacLennan, Kary B. Mullis
- 1992 Leland H. Hartwell, Yoshio Masui, Paul M. Nurse, Richard Peto, Bert Vogelstein, Robert A. Weinberg
- 1993 Mario R. Capecchi, Oliver Smithies, Alvan Feinstein, Stanley B. Prusiner, Michel M. Ter-Pogossian
- 1994 Pamela J. Bjorkman, Don C. Wiley, Tony Hunter, Anthony J. Pawson, Donald Metcalf
- 1995 Bruce Alberts, Arthur Kornberg, Roger Y. Tsien, Peter Doherty
- 1996 Robert S. Langer, Barry J. Marshall, James E. Rothman, Randy W. Schekman, Janet Rowley
- 1997 Corey Goodman, Erkki Ruoslahti, Richard O. Hynes, Alfred G. Knudson Jr.
- 1998 Elizabeth Blackburn, Carol W. Greider, Giuseppe Attardi, Walter Neupert, Gottfried Schatz
- 1999 Avram Hershko, Alexander J. Varshavsky, Robert Horvitz, Andrew Wyllie
- 2000 Jack Hirsh, Roger D. Kornberg, Robert G. Roeder, Alain Townsend, Emil Unanue
- 2001 Clay Armstrong, Bertil Hille, Roderick MacKinnon, Marc Kirschner
- 2002 Phil Green, Eric Lander, Maynard V. Olson, John E. Sulston, J. Craig Venter, Michael S. Waterman, Robert Waterston, Jean Weissenbach, Francis S. Collins (Award of Merit), James D. Watson (Award of Merit)
- 2003 Richard Axel, Linda B. Buck, Wayne Hendrickson, Seiji Ogawa, Ralph M. Steinman
- 2004 Seymour Benzer, R. John Ellis, F. Ulrich Hartl, Arthur L. Horwich, George Sachs
- 2005 Jeffrey M. Friedman, Douglas L. Coleman, Craig C. Mello, Andrew Z. Fire, Brenda Milner, Endel Tulving
- 2006 Ralph L. Brinster, Ronald M. Evans, Alan Hall, Thomas D. Pollard, Joan A. Steitz
- 2007 C. David Allis, Kim A. Nasmyth, Dennis J. Slamon, Harry F. Noller, Thomas A. Steitz
- 2008 Victor Ambros, Gary Ruvkun, Harald zur Hausen, Nahum Sonenberg, Samuel Weiss
- 2009 Peter Walter, Kazutoshi Mori, Lucy Shapiro, Richard Losick, Shinya Yamanaka
- 2010 William A. Catterall, Pierre Chambon, William G. Kaelin Jr., Peter J. Ratcliffe, Gregg L. Semenza
- 2011 Adrian Peter Bird, Howard Cedar, Aharon Razin, Jules A. Hoffmann, Shizuo Akira
- 2012 Jeffrey C. Hall, Michael Rosbash, Michael W. Young, Thomas Jessell, Jeffrey V. Ravetch
- 2013 Harvey J. Alter, Daniel W. Bradley, Michael Houghton (award declined), Stephen Joseph Elledge, Gregory Winter
- 2014 James P. Allison, Titia de Lange, Marc Feldmann, Ravinder Nath Maini, Harold F. Dvorak, Napoleone Ferrara
- 2015 Lewis C. Cantley, Michael N. Hall, Lynne E. Maquat, Yoshinori Ohsumi, Shimon Sakaguchi
- 2016 Feng Zhang, Jennifer Doudna, Emmanuelle Charpentier, Philippe Horvath, Rodolphe Barrangou
- 2017 Akira Endo, David Julius, Antoine Hakim, Lewis E. Kay, Rino Rappuoli, Huda Zoghbi
- 2018 Azim Surani, Davor Solter, Edward Boyden, Karl Deisseroth, Peter Hegemann
- 2019 John F. X. Diffley, Ronald Vale, Timothy A. Springer, Bruce Stillman, Susan Band Horwitz
- 2020 Roel Nusse, Rolf Kemler, Mina J. Bissell, Masatoshi Takeichi, Elaine Fuchs
- 2021 Daniel J. Drucker, Joel Francis Habener, Jens Juul Holst, Mary-Claire King
- 2022 Pieter Cullis, John Dick, Katalin Kariko, Drew Weissman, Stuart Orkin
- 2023 Demis Hassabis, John M. Jumper, Bonnie L. Bassler, E. Peter Greenberg, Michael R. Silverman
- 2024 Pascal Mayer, Shankar Balasubramanian, David Klenerman, Michel Sadelain, Zelig Eshhar
- 2025 Spyros Artavanis-Tsakonas, Iva Greenwald, Gary Struhl, Michael Welsh, and Paul Negulescu
- 2026 Matthias Mann, Ruedi Aebersold, Jeffery W. Kelly, John R. Yates III, and Wolfgang Baumeister

== See also ==
- Canada Gairdner Global Health Award
- Canada Gairdner Wightman Award
- List of biomedical science awards

== Notes and references ==
- "Index of Winners". Gairdner Foundation.
