= Charles David Allis =

American molecular biologist (1951–2023)

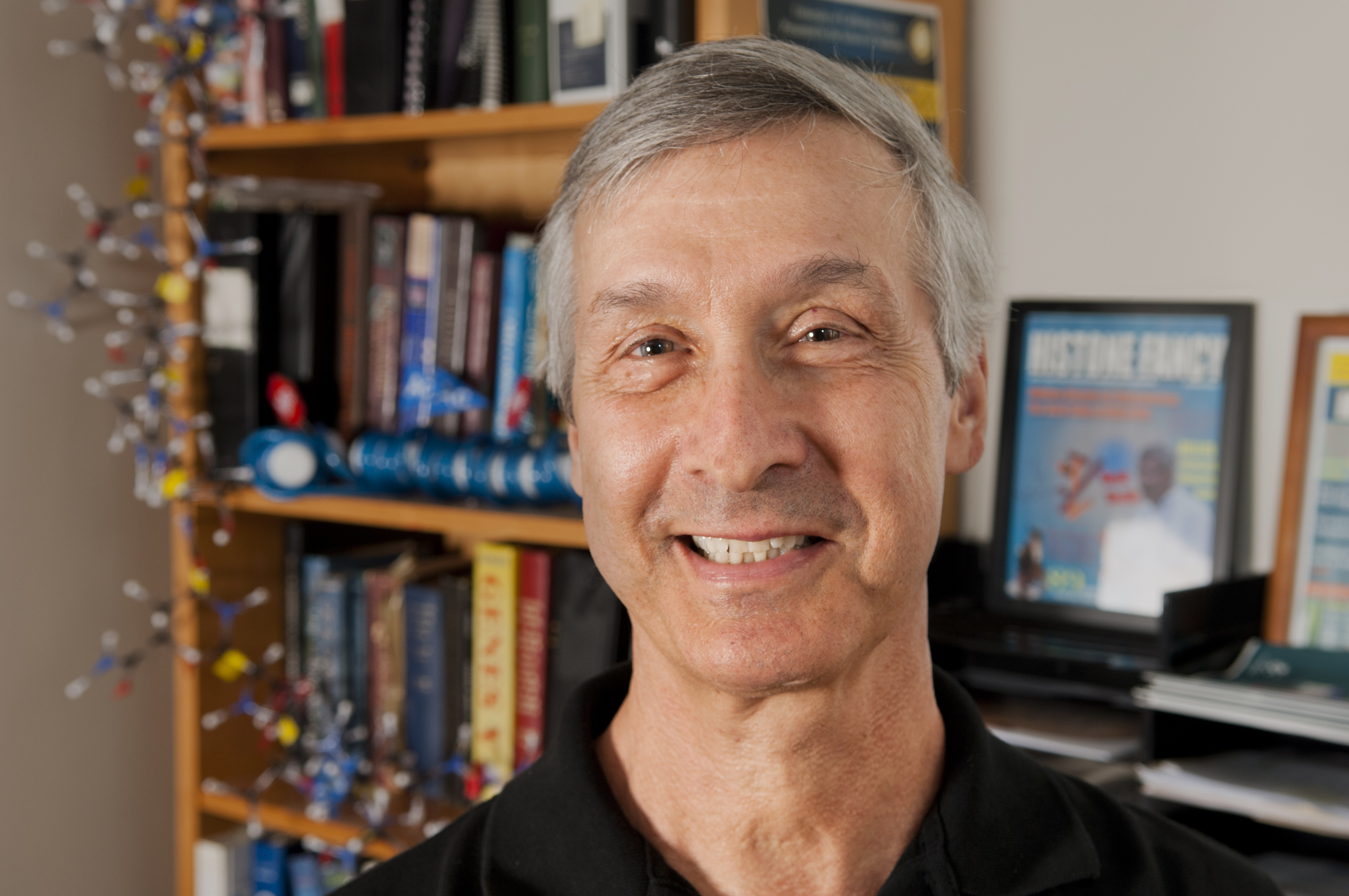
- Born: March 22, 1951; Cincinnati, Ohio, US
- Died: January 8, 2023 (aged 71); Seattle, Washington, US
- Education: University of Cincinnati (BSc); Indiana University (MSc, PhD)
- Known for: Research of histone modifications
- Awards: Canada Gairdner International Award; Japan Prize; Grand Prix Charles-Leopold Mayer; Breakthrough Prize in Life Sciences; Gruber Prize in Genetics; Albert Lasker Award for Basic Medical Research; Albany Medical Center Prize
- Scientific career
- Fields: Epigenetics
- Workplaces: Rockefeller University; University of Virginia; University of Rochester; Baylor College of Medicine
- Thesis: Isolation and characterization of pole cells and polar granules from embryos of Drosophila melanogaster (1978)
- Doctoral advisor: Anthony Mahowald

Charles David Allis (March 22, 1951 – January 8, 2023) was an American molecular biologist, and the Joy and Jack Fishman Professor at the Rockefeller University. He was also the Head of the Laboratory of Chromatin Biology and Epigenetics, and a professor at the Tri-Institutional MD–PhD Program (the other two institutions being the Memorial Sloan Kettering Cancer Center and Weill Cornell Medicine).

== Early life and education ==
Allis was born and raised in Cincinnati, Ohio. His father was a city planner and his mother an elementary school teacher. He entered the University of Cincinnati in 1969, majoring in biology. He had his first experience of basic research in his senior (or fourth) year of Bachelor of Science. The experience attracted him to research, and he went to Indiana University Bloomington for graduate studies. He graduated with an MSc in 1975 and a PhD three years later, under the supervision of Anthony Mahowald.

== Career ==
Allis undertook a postdoctoral fellowship in the University of Rochester after obtaining his PhD. In 1981, he joined the Baylor College of Medicine as an assistant professor in the Department of Biochemistry and Department of Cell Biology, and was promoted to associate professor in 1986 and full professor in 1989. He joined the Department of Biology at Syracuse University College of Arts and Sciences in 1990.

Allis returned to the University of Rochester in 1995, and became the Marie Curran Wilson and Joseph Chamberlain Wilson Professor of Biology two years later. In 1998, Allis went to the Department of Biochemistry and Molecular Genetics at the University of Virginia School of Medicine. He joined the Rockefeller University in 2003 as the Joy and Jack Fishman Professor and Head of the Laboratory of Chromatin Biology and Epigenetics.

Allis had been treated for cancer. He died January 8, 2023, at a hospital in Seattle, Washington.

== Research ==
Allis was known for his research of histone modifications and their relation to chromatin structure. He started working on Tetrahymena, a ciliated unicellular eukaryote. Tetrahymena is an ideal candidate to study histone acetylation due to its dual nucleus. It has a larger macronucleus that is transcriptionally active and somatic, and a smaller micronucleus that is transcriptionally silent and germline. Chromatin biology at the time was not a popular topic; nor was the use of ciliated organisms.

In 1996, his group isolated the histone acetyltransferase p55 from Tetrahymena, an enzyme that acetylates histones, and found the enzyme was homologous to Gcn5p, a known transcriptional co-activator in yeast. This was the first time that histone acetyltransferases were connected to DNA transcription activation, verifying Vincent Allfrey's hypothesis in the 1960s that histone acetylation regulates transcription.

Following this seminal report, Allis continued studying histone acetylation, discovering more histone acetyltransferases, including TAF1 (part of the transcription factor TF_{II}D needed to initiate transcription). Allis also branched off to researching histone phosphorylation and histone methylation. He linked histone phosphorylation to mitosis and mitogen stimulation, and established a synergistic relationship between histone phosphorylation and acetylation. He also determined the role of methylation at lysine 9 of histone H3, identified SET domain-containing proteins as histone methyltransferase, and found that histone ubiquitylation regulates histone methylation.

In 2000, Allis and Brian Strahl proposed the "histone code hypothesis", which states that DNA transcription is largely regulated by histone modifications. Later, Allis (together with Thomas Jenuwein) explicitly associated the histone code with epigenetics, and recognized the clinical significance of histone modifications, especially in cancers.

In more recent years, his attention turned to "oncohistones", which are histones with mutations that distort normal histone modifications, leading to cancers.

== Honors and awards ==
- Member of the American Academy of Arts and Sciences (2001)
- Dickson Prize in Medicine (2002)
- Massry Prize (2003)
- Wiley Prize in Biomedical Sciences (2004)
- Member of the National Academy of Sciences (2005)
- Distinguished Alumnus Award, University of Cincinnati College of Arts and Sciences (2007)
- Gairdner Foundation International Award (2007)
- American Society for Biochemistry and Molecular Biology-Merck Award (2008)
- Lewis S. Rosenstiel Award for Distinguished Work in Basic Medical Research (2010)
- Japan Prize (2014)
- Grand Prix Charles-Leopold Mayer (2014)
- Breakthrough Prize in Life Sciences (2015)
- Gruber Prize in Genetics (2016)
- March of Dimes Prize in Developmental Biology (2017)
- Albert Lasker Award for Basic Medical Research (2018)
- Member of the National Academy of Medicine (2019)
- Albany Medical Center Prize (2022)

Allis was a member of Phi Beta Kappa when he graduated from the University of Cincinnati.

The C. David Allis Mentorship Fund for Young Scientists at the Rockefeller University was established in his honor.
