= Spyros Artavanis-Tsakonas =

Spyros Artavanis-Tsakonas is Professor of Cell Biology, Emeritus, Harvard Medical School, known for his research on cancer cell signalling. He completed his doctorate at the University of Cambridge. Since 2023, he has been a member of the National Academy of Sciences. For his work he won the 2025 Gairdner International Award along with Iva Greenwald and Gary Struhl.
