= Martina Sester =

Biologist, immunology and transplant specialist

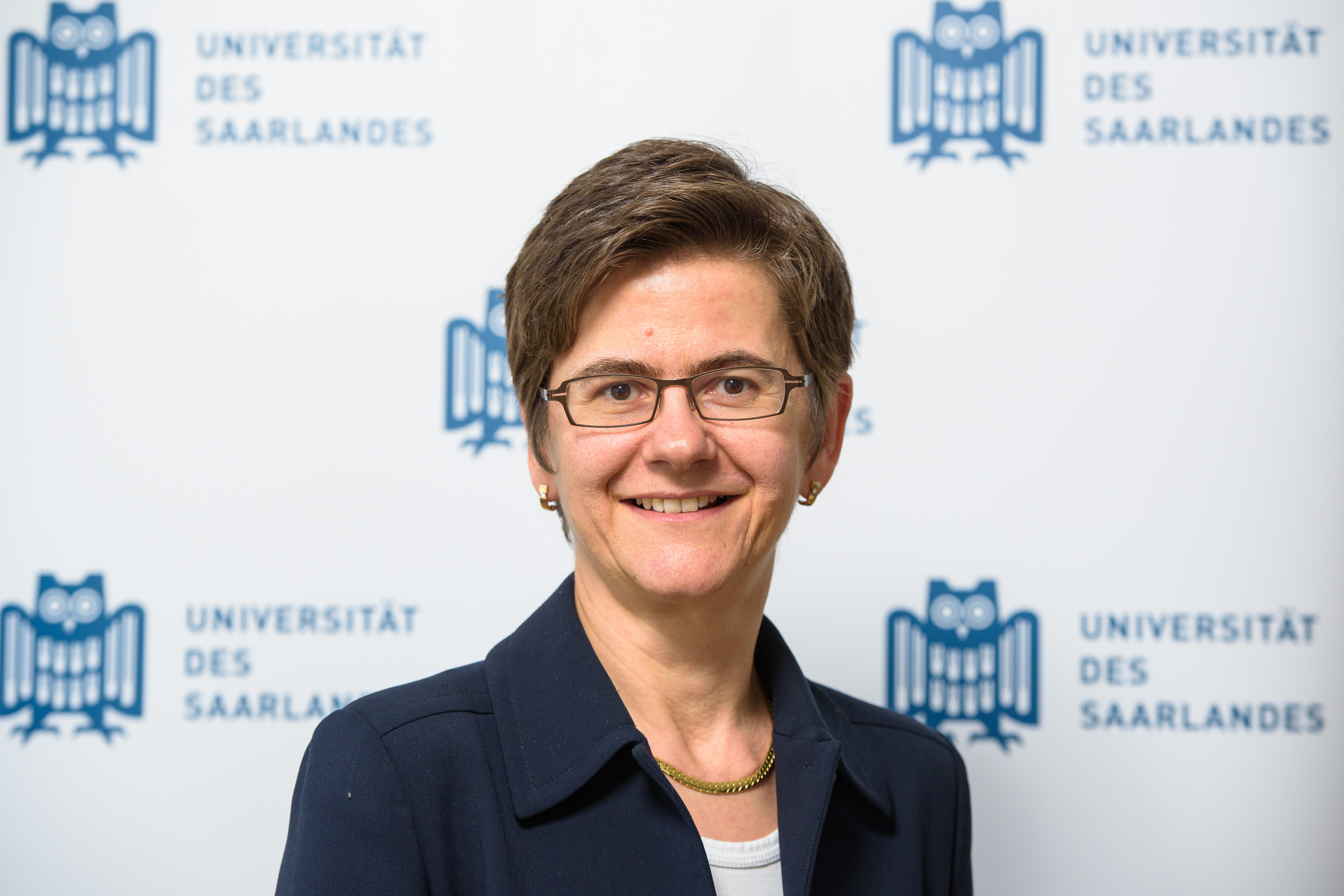
- Title: Professor of Transplantation and Infection Immunology

Academic background
- Education: Max Planck Institute of Immunobiology and Epigenetics
- Thesis: Struktur-Funktions-Analyse des Adenovirus E3/19K Proteins: Charakterisierung der Interaktion mit MHC Klasse I Molekülen und dem 'Amyloid Precursor like Protein 2' (APLP2) (1996)

Academic work
- Discipline: Biologist
- Website: https://www.uniklinikum-saarland.de/de/einrichtungen/kliniken_institute/infektionsmedizin/transplantations_und_infektionsimmunologie

Martina Sester is a biologist, Professor of Transplantation and Infection Immunology and Head of Department of the Institute of Infection Medicine at Saarland University Hospital as well as former Vice President for Research and Technology Transfer at Saarland University.

In her department, she combines basic and clinical research and focuses on analysing the reaction of the immune system to pathogens such as the human cytomegalovirus, the tubercle bacillus, adenoviruses or HIV. She also deals with the optimization of immunosuppression, for example after organ transplantation.

== Career ==
Martina Sester studied biology at the Albert Ludwig University of Freiburg and at the University of Sussex in Brighton from 1991 to 1994. In 1996, she completed her doctorate at the Max Planck Institute for Immunobiology in Freiburg with a thesis on proteins of a subtype of adenoviruses.

After her doctorate, she moved to Saarland University Hospital (UKS) in Homburg and headed a research laboratory focusing on infection immunology and immune monitoring until 2009.

In 1999, the Association of Friends of the UKS awarded her the €10,000 research prize on the topic of “Accurate virus diagnostics after transplantations”.

In 2004 she habilitated and received the authorisation to teach in the subject of experimental medicine.

In the following years, she and a colleague developed a new immunoassay for transplantation. The procedure is used to test whether a patient's immune system is strong enough to fight an infection with the cytomegalovirus or whether it is necessary to take action against possible complications with medication. For this purpose, the individual relationship between viral load and immune defence is determined. The procedure was included in routine diagnostics after organ transplants at the university hospital and formed the basis for further research projects in the field of other bacterial and viral infections and found its way into more than 100 publications.

In 2009, Martina Sester was appointed Professor of Transplantation and Infection Immunology at the UKS.

In addition to her academic career, Martina Sester is involved in the committees of her university. She was deputy vice dean of the Department of Clinical Medicine and deputy dean of research.

She is a member of national and international professional societies, such as the steering committee of TBNet, an international tuberculosis network, for the area of translational research. In the Transplantation Society, a research NGO on transplant medicine, she worked on the guidelines for the management of cytomegalovirus infections after organ transplantation as a member of the CMV expert group in 2017. Furthermore, she is co-author of further medical guidelines.

In 2018, she was awarded the Memento Research Prize for Neglected Diseases for her contribution to combating tuberculosis or improving healthcare for people affected by the disease.

== Publications (Selection) ==
- Struktur-Funktions-Analyse des Adenovirus E3/19K Proteins: Charakterisierung der Interaktion mit MHC Klasse I Molekülen und dem 'Amyloid Precursor like Protein 2' (APLP2) (Dissertation) (in German). Freiburg (Breisgau). 1996.
