= Ibrahim Cissé =

Ibrahim Cissé may refer to:

- Ibrahim Cissé (academic) (born 1983), Nigerien biophysicist and professor
- Ibrahim Cissé (footballer, born 1996), French footballer
- Ibrahim Cissé (footballer, born 1999), Ivorian footballer
- Ibrahim Cissé (footballer, born 2003), Ivorian footballer

== See also ==
- Ibrahima Cissé (born 1994), Guinean footballer
