= Thomas Boehm =

Thomas Boehm or Böhm may refer to:

- Thomas Boehm (biologist)
- Thomas Böhm (swimmer)
