= Robert Russell Race =

British geneticist

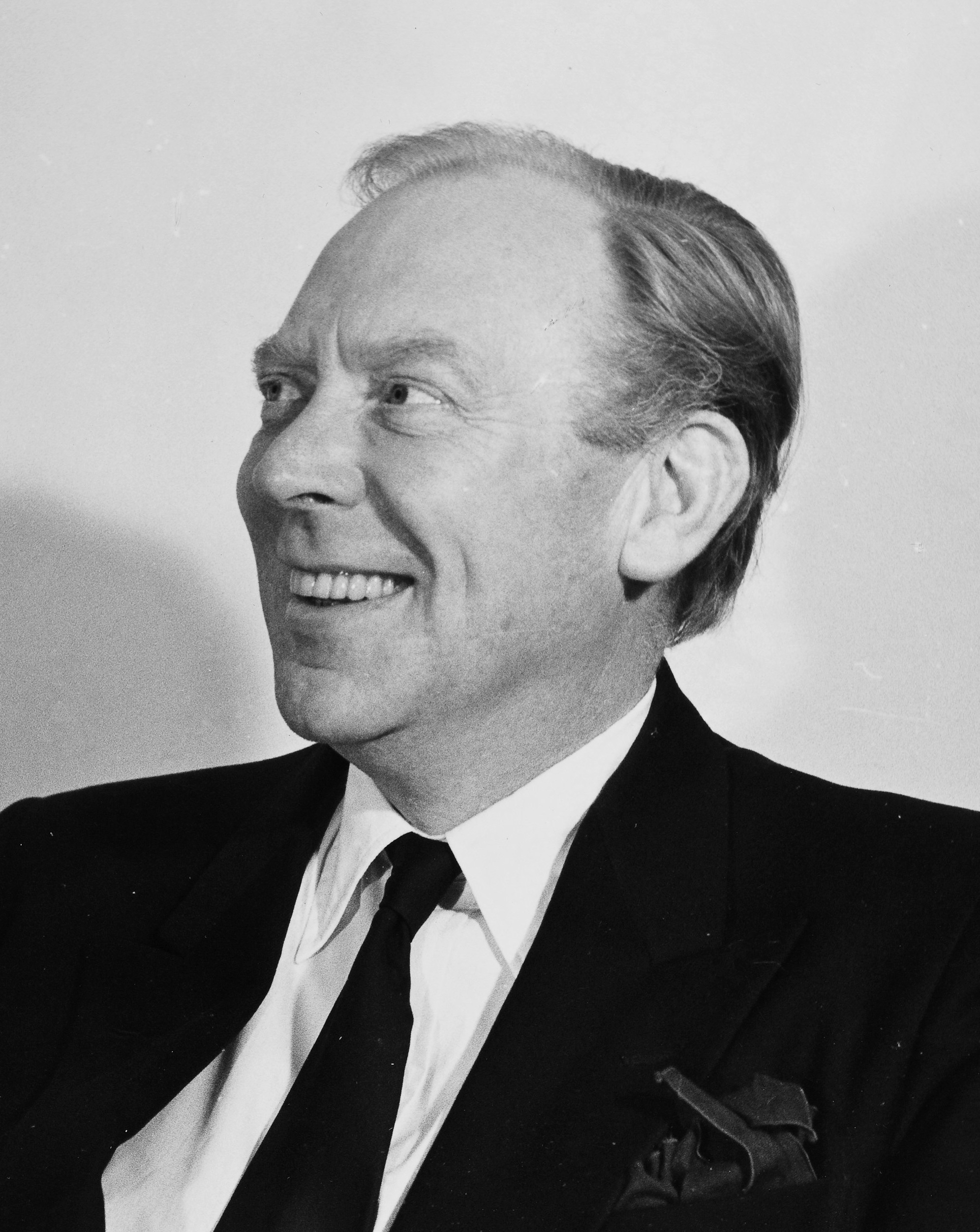
- Born: 28 November 1907; Hull, England
- Died: 15 April 1984 (aged 76)
- Education: St Bartholomew's Hospital, London
- Known for: Blood Groups in Man, mapping the X chromosome
- Spouse(s): Margaret Monica Rotton (1938–1956); Ruth Sanger (1956–1984)
- Awards: Karl Landsteiner Memorial Award, Gairdner Award
- Scientific career
- Fields: Medicine, human genetics
- Institutions: Galton Laboratory, University College London; MRC Blood Group Research Unit

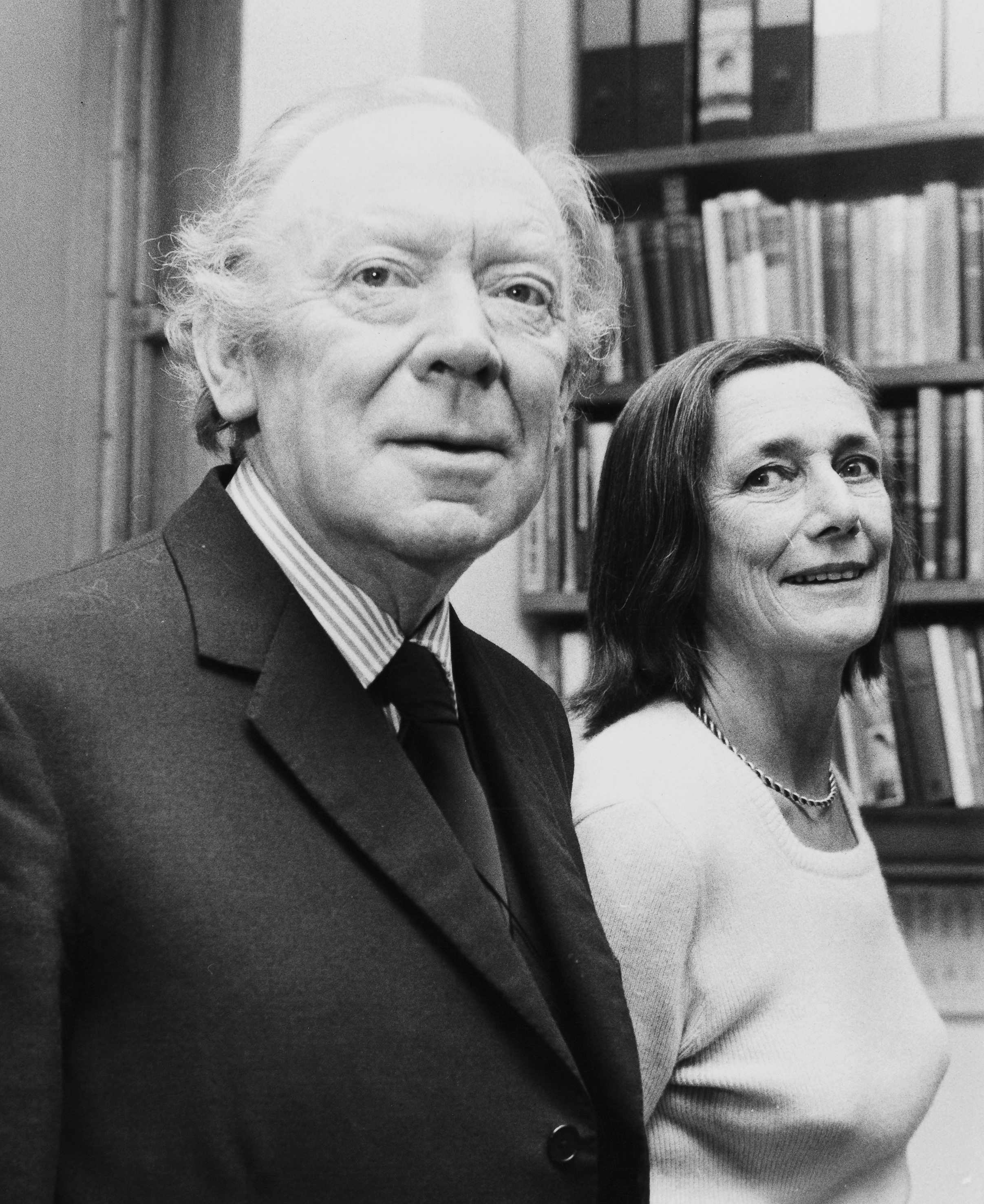
Robert Russell Race and Ruth Sanger in 1973

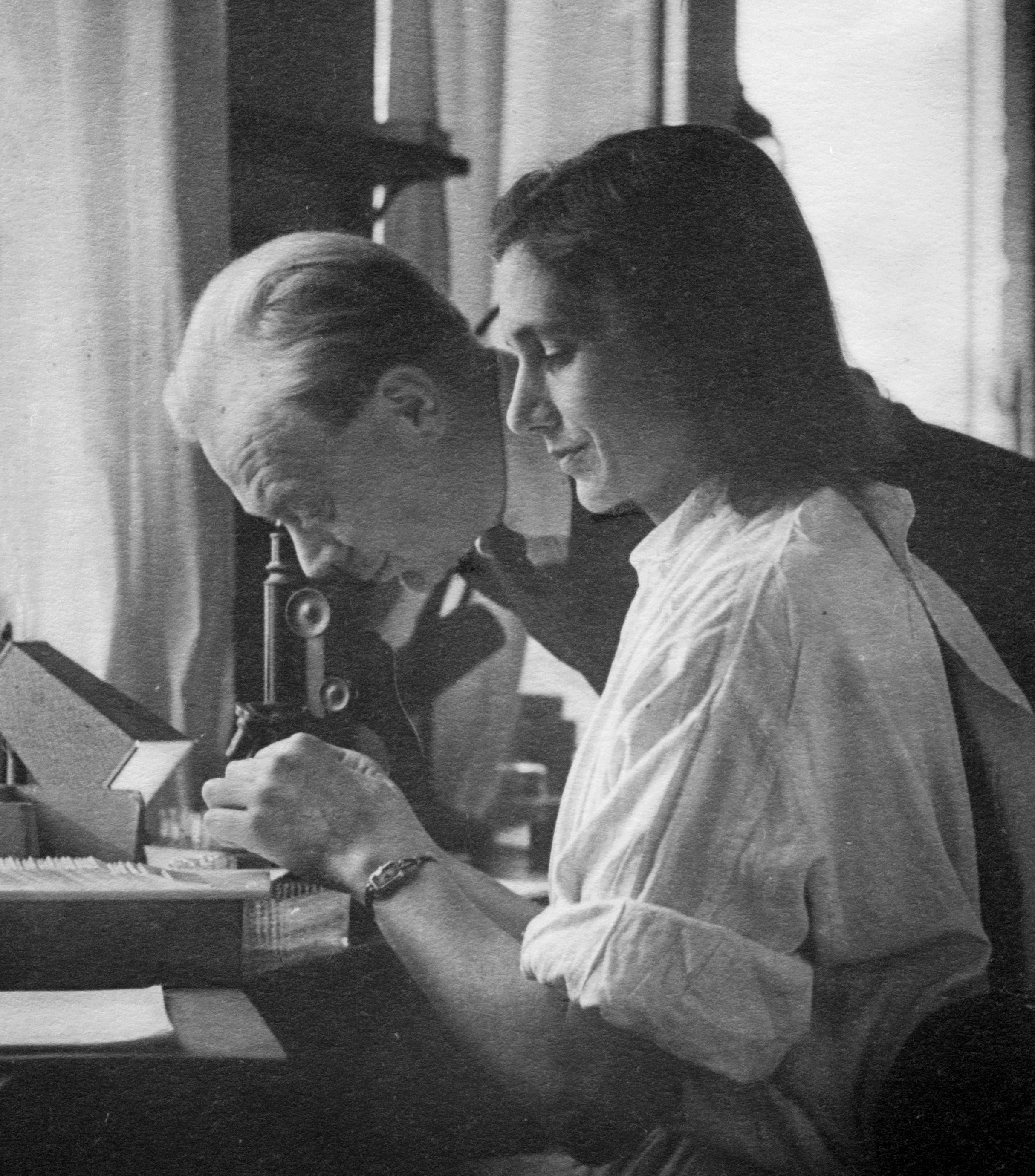
Robert Russell Race and Ruth Sanger c1950

Robert Russell Race (28 November 1907 – 15 April 1984) was a British medical doctor and human geneticist. He was Director of the Medical Research Council Blood Group Unit, of the Lister Institute of Preventive Medicine. His second wife, whom he married in 1956, was Ruth Sanger, who succeeded him in the post.

== Career ==
In 1937, after training at St Bartholomew's Hospital in London, Race worked as a serologist in the blood-typing department being established by Ronald Fisher at the Galton Laboratory at University College London. The serum unit moved to Cambridge at the beginning of the Second World War, and in 1941 Race and Arthur Mourant began investigating the family of Rh antigens. This work followed from developments made by Karl Landsteiner and Alexander S. Wiener in the USA.

In 1946 Race was appointed head of the Medical Research Council Blood Group Research Unit. During the same year, Ruth Sanger moved to London to complete her PhD. She joined Race's group as assistant to Race. Sanger and Race married in 1956 following the death of Race's first wife.

Together Race and Sanger published Blood Groups in Man in 1950, which eventually spanned six editions. Their work continued in the 1960s with the discovery of the Xg antigen system and mapping the X chromosome.

Race retired in 1973, and Sanger was named as director of the MRC Blood Group Unit. They received many honors and awards in their joint names, including the Karl Landsteiner Memorial Award and the Gairdner Award.
