= Max Planck Institute of Immunobiology and Epigenetics =

Interdisciplinary research institute in Freiburg, Germany

Coordinates: 48°1′30″N 7°51′6″E

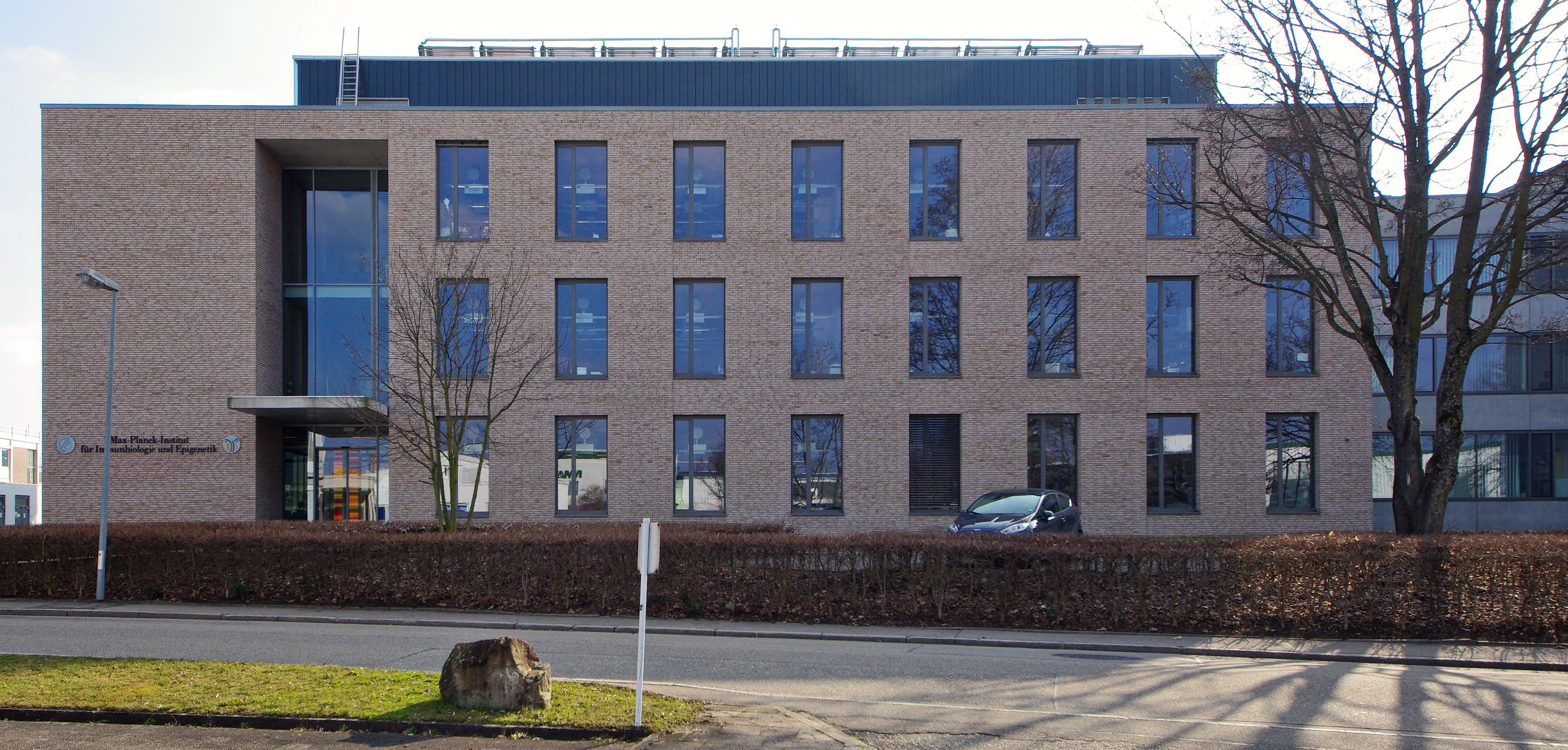
- Main building of the institute at Freiburg
- Abbreviation: MPI-IE
- Formation: 1961; 65 years ago (as Max Planck Institute of Immunobiology)
- Type: Scientific institution
- Purpose: Research in immunobiology, developmental biology and epigenetics
- Headquarters: Freiburg, Germany
- Parent organization: Max Planck Society
- Website: (in English) (in German)

The Max Planck Institute of Immunobiology and Epigenetics (German: Max-Planck-Institut für Immunbiologie und Epigenetik) in Freiburg, Germany is an interdisciplinary research institute that conducts basic research in modern immunobiology, developmental biology and epigenetics. It was founded in 1961 as the Max Planck Institute of Immunobiology and is one of 86 institutions of the Max Planck Society. Originally named the Max Planck Institute of Immunobiology, it was renamed to its current name in 2010 as it widened its research thrusts to the study of epigenetics.

The researchers of the institute study the development of the immune system and analyse the genes and molecules which are important for its function. They also seek to establish which factors control the maturation of immune cells and how chemical changes of the DNA influence the immune defense. The biologist Georges J. F. Köhler, a co-recipient of the 1984 Nobel Prize in Physiology or Medicine, was director of the institute from 1984 until his death in 1995.

== History ==
The institute was founded in 1961 and grew out of the research activities of the pharmaceutical company Wander AG in Freiburg. By the 1970s, MPIIE was engaged in studies focusing on interactions between infectious agents, particularly endotoxin, and the human immune system. The research scope was then expanded into cellular and molecular mechanisms of B and T cells in the next decade. From the 1990s, the institute focused increasingly on genetic imprinting and epigenetics. The research fields were later expanded to include molecular mechanisms of lymphoid cell differentiation and the regulation of genes via extracellular signals. In 2007, the Max Planck Institute of Immunobiology included epigenetics as a new research department and thus the institute was formally renamed the Max Planck Institute of Immunobiology and Epigenetics in 2010.

== Organization ==
The Max Planck Institute of Immunobiology and Epigenetics is organised into five departments (currently Chromatin Regulation, Epigenetics, Developmental Immunology, Biological Physics & Developmental Epigenetics). In addition to the four departments, ten research groups are currently active at MPI-IE, as well as 1 emeritus research group. They are either department-associated or department-independent. All groups are considered equivalent. The institute also included an adjunct University Department on Molecular Immunology headed by Michael Reth from 2002 to 2017, the Spemann Laboratory from 1990 to 2021, which aimed to promote the early independence of junior scientists.

=== Chromatin Regulation ===
The Department of Chromatin Regulation, under Asifa Akhtar, aims to study chromatin and epigenetic mechanisms within gene regulation. the department further looks into whether chromosome organization and nuclear architecture plays a role in transcription activity and how this influences X chromosomal regulation. These are done through a holistic application of dosage compensations through biochemical, genetic, genomic and bioinformatic methodologies

=== Developmental Immunology ===
Under the leadership of Thomas Boehm, the Department of Developmental Immunology strives to understand the biology and evolution of lymphoid organs and the adaptive immune system, intestinal immune system, and adaptive and innate immunity. The department consists of two independent research groups.

=== Epigenetics ===
Headed by Thomas Jenuwein, the department focuses on basic epigenetic mechanisms in normal development and complex diseases such as diabetes and obesity. The department consists of two independent research groups.

=== Biological Physics ===
The Department of Biological Physics, under Ibrahim Cissé, using live cell Single Molecule and Super-Resolution imaging to study biomolecular interactions in mammalian cells.

=== Developmental Epigenetics ===
The Department of Developmental Epigenetics is headed by Nicola Iovino and wants to unravels the mechanisms that regulate epigenetic reprogramming of gametes, germline epigenetic inheritance, and de novo establishment of epigenetic memory by using Drosophila melanogaster early embryo as a model system.

== Management ==
The Management Board of the MPI comprises elected scientific members of the Max Planck Society. These serve a dual function as co-directors of the institute and as department heads. The managing directorship rotates every three years among these co-directors. Currently, the Management Board (Kollegium) comprises the following members:

Managing Director:

- Ibrahim Cissé

Scientific Members:

- Asifa Akhtar
- Thomas Boehm
- Nicola Iovino
- Thomas Jenuwein

Adjunct Scientific Member:

- Michael Sela
- Barbara B. Knowles
- Michael Reth
- Alain Fischer

== Directorship ==
The following were the directors of the institute:

- 1961–1982 Otto Westphal
- 1964–1981 Herbert Fischer
- 1965–1988 Otto Lüderitz
- 1981–2004 Klaus Eichmann
- 1984–1995 Georges J. F. Köhler
- 1991–2006 Davor Solter
- 1992–2013 Rolf Kemler
- 2004–2020 Rudolf Grosschedl
- 2015–2020 Erika L. Pearce

== Graduate program ==
The International Max Planck Research School for Immunobiology, Epigenetics, and Metabolism (IMPRS-IEM) is a PhD program covering practical experimental skills in molecular and cellular biology and theoretical knowledge and in-depth analysis of scientific literature. IMPRS-IEM is the successor program to International Max Planck Research School for Molecular and Cellular Biology (IMPRS-MCB), which established in 2006 on the initiative of scientists of the Albert Ludwigs University of Freiburg and the Max Planck Institute of Immunobiology and is run in cooperation with the University of Freiburg.
