= Peter Joseph Moloney =

Peter Joseph Moloney OBE FRSC (29 June 1891, Penetanguishene, Ontario – 12 August 1989, Toronto, Ontario) was a Canadian chemist. He is known for his work on developing vaccines against diphtheria and tetanus, purifying insulin preparations for clinical use, demonstrating antibodies against insulin in humans and animals, and developing sulfated insulin preparations for the treatment of diabetics with insulin resistance. He also invented a quick-acting pH electrode and helped to develop an antiserum that was used in WW II for protection against gas gangrene.

== Biography ==
Peter Joseph Moloney and his three sisters, whose father died in 1897, were raised in Powassan by their widowed mother. The four siblings were the grandchildren of Irish Catholics who left Ireland during the Great Famine of Ireland and settled in Warminster, Southern Ontario. He received secondary education at the preparatory school of St. Michael's College, Toronto. He earned a bachelor's degree from the University of Toronto in 1912 and a master's degree with thesis Rate of Solution and Precipitation of Gypsum in chemistry in 1915. During a stay at the University of California at Berkeley for the academic year 1915–1916, he met Angelina Cecilia Chapman. They married in Berkeley on July 6, 1916. Moloney worked between 1917 and 1919 at the Department of Agriculture in Ottawa in food chemistry.

From 1919 Moloney worked as a research assistant for Connaught Laboratories, a vaccine manufacturer that emerged from the University of Toronto and now belongs to Sanofi. While working for Connaught Laboratories he studied at the University of Toronto, where his mentor was John G. FitzGerald. After acquiring a Ph.D. with thesis On the Purification of Insulin in 1924 from the University of Toronto, Moloney was in the working group of Charles Best and Frederick Banting from 1921 with the purification of insulin to make it clinically usable, which was achieved for the first time in 1922.

The Moloney electrode, developed in 1921, is "designed to more accurately and rapidly determine the acidity of bacterial culture broths used in antitoxin and vaccine production." Hermann F. Schott (1904–1986) in his 1933 Ph.D. thesis gave a brief description of the Moloney electrode and its use.

At Connaught Laboratories during the 1920s, Moloney dealt with the diphtheria toxin, whose preparation he directed from 1924. With Charles Beecher Weld (1899–1991), he developed the first diphtheria toxoid in North America. Moloney helped to develop a detection test for diphtheria toxin (the "Moloney test") and established methods for the detection and purification of tetanus toxin and contributed to the elucidation of its antigen structure. From 1931 he headed the "Chemistry in Relation to Hygiene" department of the School of Hygiene (dealing with microbiology) of the University of Toronto. He was part of the group that successfully developed methods for producing penicillin on a large scale during WW II. Moloney and co-workers were also able to prepare a polyvalent immune serum against gas gangrene. With Anthony L. Tosoni, he provided the basis for a new method for the production of penicillin in large quantities.

Moloney was deputy director of Connaught Laboratories from 1925 until his retirement in 1961, but continued to work for the company as a researcher and consultant into his ninth decade. His last publications in the early 1970s dealt with insulin resistance and insulin as antigen. Moloney held 7 U.S. patents, including those for the manufacture of insulin and the manufacture of heparin. He registered his last patent when he was 90 years old. In 1977, on the grounds of Connaught Laboratories Ltd. the Moloney Building opened.

Peter J. Moloney and his wife Angela were devout Catholics. They had a daughter and four sons.

== Awards and honours ==
- 1936 Fellow of the Royal Society of Canada
- 1946 Order of the British Empire
- 1962 Honorary member of the Canadian Public Health Association (CPHA)
- 1964 Banting Medal of the American Diabetes Association
- 1967 Canada Gairdner International Award
- 1971 Honorary doctor of the University of Toronto
- 1971 Charles H. Best Prize

== Selected publications ==
- Moloney, P. J. (1926). "The preparation and testing of diphtheria toxoid (Anatoxine-Ramon)". American Journal of Public Health. 16 (12): 1208–1210. doi:10.2105/AJPH.16.12.1208. PMC 1321494. PMID 18012024.
- Moloney, P. J.; Fraser, C. J. (1927). "Immunization with diphtheria toxoid (anatoxine Ramon)". American Journal of Public Health. 17 (10): 1027–1030. doi:10.2105/AJPH.17.10.1027. PMC 1321911. PMID 18012293.
- Taylor, E. M.; Moloney, P. J. (1939). "A New Schick-Toxin". The Journal of Immunology. 37 (3): 223–232. doi:10.4049/jimmunol.37.3.223. S2CID 86572393.
- Fitzgerald, J. G.; Defries, R. D.; Fraser, D. T.; Moloney, P. J.; McKinnon, N. E. (1932). "Experiences with Diphtheria Toxoid in Canada". American Journal of Public Health and the Nation's Health. 22 (1): 25–28. doi:10.2105/ajph.22.1.25. PMC 1556712. PMID 18013424.
- Moloney, P. J.; Hennessy, J. N. (1942). "Purification of tetanus toxoid". The Biochemical Journal. 36 (7–9): 544–547. doi:10.1042/bj0360544. PMC 1266838. PMID 16747558.
- Moloney, P. J.; Hennessy, Joan N. (1944). "Titration of Tetanal Toxins and Toxoids by Flocculation". The Journal of Immunology. 48 (6): 345–354. doi:10.4049/jimmunol.48.6.345. S2CID 88201977.
- Moloney, P. J.; Coval, M. (1955). "Antigenicity of insulin: Diabetes induced by specific antibodies". The Biochemical Journal. 59 (2): 179–185. doi:10.1042/bj0590179. PMC 1216116. PMID 14351177.
- Moloney, P. J.; Goldsmith, L. (1957). "On the Antigenicity of Insulin". Canadian Journal of Biochemistry and Physiology. 35 (1): 79–92. doi:10.1139/y57-011. PMID 13396665.
- Ezrin, Calvin; Moloney, Peter J. (1959). "Resistance to Insulin Due to Neutralizing Antibodies". The Journal of Clinical Endocrinology & Metabolism. 19 (9): 1055–1068. doi:10.1210/jcem-19-9-1055. PMID 13821166.
- Moloney, P. J.; Aprile, M. A. (1959). "On the Antigenicity of Insulin: Flocculation of Insulin-Antiinsulin". Canadian Journal of Biochemistry and Physiology. 37 (6): 793–800. doi:10.1139/o59-086. PMID 13651981.
- Wardlaw, A. C.; Moloney, P. J. (1961). "The Assay of Insulin with Anti-Insulin and Mouse Diaphragm". Canadian Journal of Biochemistry and Physiology. 39 (4): 695–712. doi:10.1139/o61-071. PMID 13783129.
