= Harry M. Rose =

Harry Melvin Rose (May 30, 1906, in Niles, Ohio – November 4, 1986, in Meredith, New Hampshire) was an American physician and microbiologist whose laboratory at Columbia University developed an accurate diagnostic test for rheumatoid arthritis in 1948. The test became known as the Rose-Waaler or Waaler-Rose test, since it was independently developed by both Rose and the Norwegian bacteriologist Erik Waaler. Rose was among the first recipients of the Gairdner Foundation International Award for his work in developing the test.

Rose attended Yale University, then went to medical school at Cornell University Medical College, receiving his medical degree in 1932. He came to New York Presbyterian Hospital as an intern in 1938 and received a faculty appointment at the College of Physicians and Surgeons in 1940 as an assistant in medicine, assigned to Department of Bacteriology. With the outbreak of World War II, Rose served on the Armed Forces Epidemiological Board and performed research on tropical diseases for the United States government. In 1952, Rose was appointed John E. Borne Professor and chair of the Department of Bacteriology at Columbia University. He changed the name to the Department of Microbiology to better reflect the ongoing research in the department.

In addition to his research on rheumatoid arthritis, Rose studied antibiotic mechanisms and viruses and contributed to influenza vaccine development. He served as editor-in-chief of the Journal of Immunology and was appointed a fellow of the American College of Physicians and the American Medical Association. He was elected a member of the National Academy of Sciences.

Rose retired from Columbia University in 1973 and moved to Sandwich, New Hampshire, where he recertified as a diplomate in internal medicine and continued to practice medicine until 1984.
