= Kevin Struhl =

American biochemist

- Born: September 2, 1952; Brooklyn, NY
- Education: Massachusetts Institute of Technology (S.B. and S.M.), Stanford Medical School (Ph.D. 1979)
- Spouse(s): Marjorie Oettinger (m 1989-2012); 3 children
- Scientific career
- Fields: Molecular Biology, Cancer
- Workplaces: Massachusetts Institute of Technology; Stanford Medical School; Medical Research Council; Harvard Medical School
- Thesis: The yeast his3 gene (1979)
- Doctoral advisor: Ronald W. Davis
- Website: struhl.med.harvard.edu

Kevin Struhl (born September 2, 1952) is an American molecular biologist and the David Wesley Gaiser Professor of Biological Chemistry and Molecular Pharmacology at Harvard Medical School. Struhl is primarily known for his work on transcriptional and post transcriptional regulatory mechanisms in yeast using molecular, genetic, biochemical, and genomic approaches. In addition, he has used related approaches to study transcriptional regulatory circuits involved in cellular transformation and the formation of cancer stem cells.

== Early life and education ==
Kevin Struhl was born on September 2, 1952, in Brooklyn, New York. His father, Joseph Struhl (1921–2008), was an entrepreneur who put up some of the first indoor tennis courts. His mother, Harriet Schachter Struhl (1927–2024) was a psychologist. He has 3 younger brothers, Gary (1954-), a developmental geneticist at Columbia Medical School, Clifford (1956-) who took over the family business, and Steven (1958-) an orthopedic surgeon. The Struhl family moved to Great Neck, NY in 1956, where Struhl graduated from Great Neck South high school in 1970. Struhl and his father were once ranked #3 in father-son tennis in the Eastern section of the United States Tennis Association. Struhl completed his S.B and S.M. in biology in 1974 with Boris Magasanik from the Massachusetts Institute of Technology. He obtained his Ph.D. in 1979 with Ronald W. Davis at Stanford Medical School and then spent two years as a postdoctoral fellow with Sydney Brenner at the Laboratory of Molecular Biology at the Medical Research Council in Cambridge, UK.

== Career and Research ==
=== Recombinant DNA technology, yeast molecular biology, and reverse genetics ===
As a graduate student, Struhl cloned and functionally expressed the first eukaryotic protein-coding gene in E.coli, a landmark in recombinant DNA technology. Cloned yeast genes were essential for Gerald Fink to develop transformation methods that Struhl used to co-discover DNA replication origins and to create the first vectors for molecular genetic manipulations in yeast. Struhl was among the first to use “reverse genetic” analysis; i.e., making mutations in cloned genes, introducing the mutated derivatives back into cells, and assessing the resulting phenotypes.

=== Structure and function of eukaryotic promoters: the yeast his3 paradigm ===
Using “reverse genetics” to study gene regulation in vivo, Struhl generated the first eukaryotic promoter mutants and performed a detailed analysis of the his3 gene. This resulted in early descriptions of all the basic types of gene-regulatory elements: upstream elements that act a distance from the promoter; regulatory sites that activate gene expression in specific conditions; poly(dA:dT) sequences; functionally distinct TATA elements; initiator elements; repression sequences that act upstream of and at a distance from promoters.

=== Structure and function of a transcriptional activator, the yeast Gcn4 paradigm ===
Struhl invented “reverse biochemistry”, the use of in vitro synthesized proteins to identify DNA-binding transcription factors and study protein-DNA interactions. In one of the first examples of a eukaryotic sequence-specific binding protein, he discovered that Gcn4 coordinately activates many genes involved in amino acid biosynthesis by direct binding to target sites in their promoters. He developed the first “random selection” method for selecting DNA target sites (and other genetic elements) from random-sequence oligonucleotides. He showed that Gcn4 binds as a dimer via its leucine zipper, described how it recognizes target sites at atomic resolution, and showed that the Gcn4 binding surface folds when bound to its target site, the first example of an “induced fit” model for DNA binding. Detailed genetic dissection led to the discovery of short acidic activation domains required for transcription that are functionally autonomous and can be encoded by different sequences. Lastly, Struhl showed that the Jun oncogene encodes a Gcn4 homolog that binds the same sequences and activates transcription in yeast cells. Jun was the first example of an oncogene that encodes a transcription factor.

=== Transcriptional regulatory mechanisms ===
Using T7 RNA polymerase in yeast cells, Struhl demonstrated distinct chromatin-accessibility and protein-protein interaction mechanisms for transcriptional activation. Novel genetic approaches - altered-specificity mutants, protein fusions for artificial recruitment - along with chromatin immunoprecipitation (ChIP), demonstrated that transcriptional regulation in yeast occurs primarily at the level of recruitment of the RNA polymerase II transcription machinery. Struhl showed that the TATA-binding protein is required for transcription by all 3 nuclear RNA polymerases and defined a surface required specifically for transcription by RNA polymerase III. Together with Tom Gingeras, he used tiled microarrays to generate the first unbiased, genome-scale analysis of transcription factor binding in mammalian cells, leading to the discovery of far more transcription binding sites in vivo than predicted, including many that control non-coding RNAs. His contributions in diverse areas of transcriptional regulation include mechanistic roles of general factors for transcriptional initiation, promoter directionality, high level of transcriptional noise due to infidelity of Pol II initiation, role of TAFs and Mediator in transcriptional activation, coordinate regulation of ribosomal protein genes in response to growth and stress signals, repression by the Cyc8-Tup co-repressor complex that controls numerous stress pathways, the response to osmotic stress including the discovery of a pre-transcriptional response, transcriptional elongation, 3’ end formation, and mRNA stability. Lastly, Struhl was among the first to use ChIP to analyze transcription in E. coli, showing that the transition between initiation and elongation is highly variable and often rate-limiting and uncovering extensive functional overlap between sigma factors.

=== Role of chromatin in transcription and DNA replication ===
Struhl's work on the role of chromatin in transcriptional regulation include initial descriptions of 1) a DNA sequence, poly(dA:dT), that activates transcription via its intrinsic effect on nucleosome stability, 2) mechanistic principles for how the nucleosome positioning pattern occurs in vivo, 3) transcriptional repression via targeted recruitment of a histone deacetylase, 4) molecular memory of recent transcriptional activity via targeted histone methylation via recruitment by elongating Pol II, 5) dynamic eviction and re-association of histones during transcriptional elongation, and 6) methylation of lysine 79 within the histone H3 core and a model for position-effect variegation. With respect to DNA replication, Struhl demonstrated that a histone acetylase (HBO1) is both a transcriptional co-activator and a co-activator for the Cdt1 replication licensing factor that coordinates the transcriptional and DNA replication response to non-genotoxic stress. In addition, he showed that the DNA origin replication complex (ORC) selectively binds regions with a specific chromatin pattern, and that the location of ORC binding sites plays a major role in DNA replication timing.

=== Selecting functional genetic elements and novel enzymes from random-sequence DNA ===
Struhl developed a “random selection” approach to select functional genetic elements from random-sequence DNA and determine their consensus sequences. Genetic selections identified E. coli promoters and yeast TATA elements, and a biochemical selection identified Gcn4 binding sites. In addition, novel b-lactamases with altered specificity against different antibiotics or resistance to suicide inhibitors were generated by replacing the active site of b-lactamase with a highly degenerate oligonucleotide.

=== Functional evolutionary approach to analyze chromatin and transcription ===
Struhl invented functional analysis of evolutionarily irrelevant DNA to address mechanistic questions independently of evolutionary constraints, something that cannot be done by standard experiments in native organisms. Analysis of DNAs from evolutionarily distant yeast species in the yeast S. cerevisiae showed that nucleosome positioning is determined predominantly by species-specific factors, not DNA sequence, and that fortuitous enhancers inevitably stimulate bidirectional transcription of enhancer RNAs. Such bidirectional transcription represents the ground state upon which evolution acts to favor transcription of coding vs. non-coding RNAs.

=== Transcriptional noise as measured by in vivo analysis of random-sequence DNA ===
Struhl developed the concept of transcriptional noise as functionally insignificant events that occur in living cells due to imperfect fidelity of biological processes and calculated that ~90% of elongating Pol II molecules in yeast represented transcriptional noise. Functional analysis of a random-sequence chromosome confirmed this high level of transcriptional noise and showed that it reflected low level, non-specific initiation at numerous sites.

=== An epigenetic switch linking inflammation to cancer ===
Struhl discovered an epigenetic switch from non-transformed to transformed cells, a new type of step in cancer progression distinct from mutation or DNA methylation. This epigenetic switch is mediated by a positive inflammatory feedback loop that involves the joint role of the NF-κB, STAT3, AP-1, and TEAD transcription factors along with YAP/TAZ co-activators as well as Let7 and other microRNAs. He also uncovered a dynamic equilibrium between cancer stem cells and non-stem cancer cells mediated by interleukin 6 and defined the transcriptional circuit mediating the biphasic switch between these physiological states.

=== Anti-cancer and anti-inflammatory properties of metformin ===
Struhl showed that metformin, the first-line drug for treating type 2 diabetes, selectively kills cancer stem cells and acts together with chemotherapy to inhibit tumor progression and prolong remission. Metformin exerts its effects on cellular transformation and cancer stem cell growth via its inhibitory effect on the inflammatory pathway.

== Awards ==
- Jane Coffin Childs Fellowship (1980)
- Searle Scholarship Recipient (1983)
- Eli Lilly Award in Microbiology (1990)
- National Institutes of Health Merit Award (1993)
- American Academy of Microbiology Fellow (1993)
- American Association for the Advancement of Science Fellow (2005)
- American Academy of Arts and Sciences Fellow (2008)
- National Academy of Science Member (2010)
- National Academy of Medicine Member (2015)
- Inducted into Albert Nelson Marquis Lifetime Achievement (2018)
- Arthur Kornberg and Paul Berg Lifetime Achievement Award (2023)
- Edward Novitski Prize, Genetics Society of America (2025)
