= Donald Walter Gordon Murray =

Canadian cardiac surgeon

- Born: May 29, 1894
- Died: January 7, 1976 (aged 81)
- Education: University of Toronto
- Awards: Gairdner Foundation International Award (1964); Order of Canada
- Scientific career
- Fields: Cardiac surgery

Donald Walter Gordon Murray, CC (May 29, 1894 – January 7, 1976), also known as "Gordon Murray", was a Canadian cardiac surgeon.

Born in Ontario, he enrolled at the University of Toronto to study medicine in 1914. During World War I, he enlisted as an artilleryman and rose to the rank of sergeant. After the war, he graduated in 1921. In 1927, he started work at the Toronto General Hospital. He is known for performing the first homograft implant into the descending thoracic aorta to treat aortic regurgitation.

In 1967, he was made a Companion of the Order of Canada "for his contribution to the development of new surgical procedures and achievements in the field of medical research".
