= International Max Planck Research School for Molecular and Cellular Biology =

The International Max Planck Research School for Molecular and Cellular Biology (IMPRS-MCB) is an international PhD program in molecular biology and cellular biology founded in 2006 by the Max Planck Institute of Immunobiology and Epigenetics and the University of Freiburg.

The Max Planck Society (MPG) started in 2000 an initiative to attract more international students to Germany to pursue their PhD studies. Therefore, International-Max-Planck-Research-Schools (IMPRS) were established. The number of IMPRS has ever been increasing since then in all three sections of research of the MPG.
