= Risk factor =

Variable associated with an increased risk of disease or infection

In epidemiology, a risk factor or determinant is a variable associated with an increased risk of disease or infection.

Due to a lack of harmonization across disciplines, determinant, in its more widely accepted scientific meaning, is often used as a synonym. The main difference lies in the realm of practice: medicine (clinical practice) versus public health. As an example from clinical practice, low ingestion of dietary sources of vitamin C is a known risk factor for developing scurvy. Specific to public health policy, a determinant is a health risk that is general, abstract, related to inequalities, and difficult for an individual to control. For example, poverty is known to be a determinant of an individual's standard of health.

Risk factors may be used to identify high-risk people.

== Correlation vs causation ==
Risk factors or determinants are correlational and not necessarily causal, because correlation does not prove causation. For example, being young cannot be said to cause measles, but young people have a higher rate of measles because they are less likely to have developed immunity during a previous epidemic. Statistical methods are frequently used to assess the strength of an association and to provide supportive evidence for causation, for example in the study of the link between smoking and lung cancer. Statistical analysis along with the biological sciences can strongly suggest that a risk factor is causal. Some prefer the term risk factor to mean causal determinants of increased rates of disease, and for unproven links to be called possible risks, associations, etc.

When done thoughtfully and based on research, identification of risk factors can be a strategy for medical screening.

== Terms of description ==
Mainly taken from risk factors for breast cancer, risk factors can be described in terms of, for example:

- Relative risk, such as "A woman is more than 100 times more likely to develop breast cancer in her 60s than in her 20s."
- Odds ratio, such as "The odds of developing breast cancer are approximately 2.45 times higher for women with two or more affected first-degree relatives compared to those without a family history."
- Fraction of incidences occurring in the group having the property of or being exposed to the risk factor, such as "99% of breast cancer cases are diagnosed in women."
- Increase in incidence in the exposed group, such as "each daily alcoholic beverage increases the incidence of breast cancer by 11 cases per 1000 women."
- Hazard ratio, such as "an increase in both total and invasive breast cancers in women randomized to receive estrogen and progestin for an average of 5 years, with a hazard ratio of 1.24 compared to controls."

== Example ==
At a wedding, 74 people ate the chicken and 22 of them were ill, while of the 35 people who had the fish or vegetarian meal only 2 were ill. Did the chicken make the people ill?

$Risk = \frac {\mbox{number of persons experiencing event (food poisoning)}} {\mbox{number of persons exposed to risk factor (food)}}$

So the chicken eaters' risk = 22/74 = 0.297
And non-chicken eaters' risk = 2/35 = 0.057.

Those who ate the chicken had a risk over five times as high as those who did not, that is, a relative risk of more than five. This suggests that eating chicken was the cause of the illness, but this is not proof.

This example of a risk factor is described in terms of the relative risk it confers, which is evaluated by comparing the risk of those exposed to the potential risk factor to those not exposed.

== General determinants ==
The probability of an outcome usually depends on an interplay between multiple associated variables. When performing epidemiological studies to evaluate one or more determinants for a specific outcome, the other determinants may act as confounding factors, and need to be controlled for, e.g. by stratification. The potentially confounding determinants varies with what outcome is studied, but the following general confounders are common to most epidemiological associations, and are the determinants most commonly controlled for in epidemiological studies:

- Age (0 to 1.5 years for infants, 1.5 to 6 years for young children, etc.)
- Sex or gender (Male or female)
- Ethnicity (Based on race)

Other less commonly adjusted for possible confounders include:

- Social status/income
- Geographic location
- Genetic predisposition
- Gender identity
- Occupation
- Overwork
- Sexual orientation
- Level of chronic stress
- Diet
- Level of physical exercise
- Alcohol consumption and tobacco smoking
- Other social determinants of health

== Risk marker ==
A risk marker is a variable that is quantitatively associated with a disease or other outcome, but direct alteration of the risk marker does not necessarily alter the risk of the outcome. For example, driving-while-intoxicated (DWI) history is a risk marker for pilots as epidemiologic studies indicate that pilots with a DWI history are significantly more likely than their counterparts without a DWI history to be involved in aviation crashes.

== History ==
The term "risk factor" was coined by former Framingham Heart Study director, William B. Kannel in a 1961 article in Annals of Internal Medicine.

== See also ==
- Health risk assessment
- Protective factor
- Risk factor (finance)
- Social determinants of health
