= William F. Hamilton (physician) =

American physician

William Ferguson Hamilton
- Born: March 8, 1893; Tombstone, Arizona Territory
- Died: December 18, 1964 (aged 71); Augusta, Georgia
- Education: Pomona College
- Occupation: Physician

William Ferguson Hamilton (March 8, 1893 – December 18, 1964) was an American physician remembered for his contributions to hemodynamics.

== Early life and education ==
Hamilton was born on March 8, 1893, in Tombstone, Arizona Territory, to Isaac Beeson Hamilton and Clara Eddy Hamilton. His father was also a physician and cared for those who lived and worked at remote ranches and mining camps. His mother was a journalist in Los Angeles before her marriage. Hamilton grew up in southern Arizona and graduated from high school in Tucson, Arizona, where he played varsity football.

Hamilton then attended Pomona College in Claremont, California, graduating in 1917 with an A.B. degree. He served in the army and then attended the University of California, Berkeley and graduated in 1921 with a Ph.D. in zoology. He subsequently spent time in the physiology departments at the University of Texas (1920–1921), Yale (1921–1923), Louisville (1923–1931), and Washington University in St. Louis (1932–1934). Hamilton then became the chairman of the Department of Physiology and Pharmacology at the Medical College of Georgia in 1934.

== Career ==
Hamilton was President of the American Physiology Society in 1955.

In 1960 he received the Gairdner Foundation International Award for his work in the use of dyes injected into the bloodstream to determine blood flow and distribution in heart disease.
