= Erika L. Pearce =

American immunologist

Erika Pearce
- Born: 1972 (age 53–54); North Fork, New York, U.S.
- Education: Cornell University; University of Pennsylvania
- Awards: Leibniz Prize (2018)
- Scientific career
- Fields: Immunology; Metabolism
- Workplaces: Johns Hopkins University; Washington University in St. Louis; Max Planck Institute of Immunobiology and Epigenetics
- Thesis: Development of CD8 T cell responses (2005)
- Website: www.ie-freiburg.mpg.de/pearce

Erika L. Pearce is an American immunologist. She is the Bloomberg Distinguished Professor at the Johns Hopkins University after serving as director and a scientific member at Max Planck Institute of Immunobiology and Epigenetics in Freiburg, Germany. Her work investigates the connection between metabolism and immune cell function with a particular focus on the regulation of T-cells. In 2018, she was awarded the Leibniz Prize for her "outstanding work in metabolism and inflammation research".

== Early life and education ==
Pearce was born in 1972, and grew up in North Fork, Long Island, New York. She completed her Bachelor of Science degree at Cornell University in 1998 and earned her PhD in cell and molecular biology from the University of Pennsylvania in 2005. While completing her postdoctoral studies at the University of Pennsylvania, Pearce began her research into how cellular metabolic processes govern immune responses to infection and cancer.

== Career ==
Upon completing her postdoctoral studies, Pearce joined the Trudeau Institute in New York City from 2009 until 2011. She left the non-profit in 2011 to become an assistant professor in the Department of Pathology and Immunology at the Washington University School of Medicine (WashU Medicine) in St. Louis. During her tenure at WashU Medicine, Pearce expanded on her earlier research into memory T cells. In 2012, her research team found that the production of additional mitochondria is triggered by Interleukin 15. She also found that genetically manipulating T cell's mitochondria could cause a higher percentage of undifferentiated T cells to become memory cells. Pearce and her colleagues also found evidence that suggested cancer cells could disable T cells ability to fight off tumors and some kinds of infection. Her research team found that withholding sugar from T cells, the cells no longer produced interferon gamma. In March 2014, Pearce was promoted to the rank of associate professor of pathology and immunology at WashU Medicine. In her new role, Pearce received two grants to assist her research into cellular metabolism in immunity to infection. She received a grant from the Burroughs Wellcome Fund and the National Cancer Institute of the National Institutes of Health.

Pearce left North America in September 2015 to become the director and a scientific member at Max Planck Institute of Immunobiology and Epigenetics in Freiburg, Germany. In 2018, she was awarded the Leibniz Prize for her "outstanding work in metabolism and inflammation research." Pearce returned to the United States in 2022 to become the Bloomberg Distinguished Professor at Johns Hopkins University.

In 2026, Pearce was elected to the National Academy of Sciences.

== Publications ==
As of 2021, Pearce has more than 18,000 citations in Google Scholar and an h-index of 49.

=== Highly cited articles (more than 1000 citations) ===
- Gubin, Matthew M.; Zhang, Xiuli; Schuster, Heiko; Caron, Etienne; Ward, Jeffrey P.; Noguchi, Takuro; Ivanova, Yulia; Hundal, Jasreet; Arthur, Cora D.; Krebber, Willem-Jan; Mulder, Gwenn E.; Toebes, Mireille; Vesely, Matthew D.; Lam, Samuel S. K.; Korman, Alan J.; Allison, James P.; Freeman, Gordon J.; Sharpe, Arlene H.; Pearce, Erika L.; Schumacher, Ton N.; Aebersold, Ruedi; Rammensee, Hans-Georg; Melief, Cornelis J. M.; Mardis, Elaine R.; Gillanders, William E.; Artyomov, Maxim N.; Schreiber, Robert D. (November 26, 2014). "Checkpoint blockade cancer immunotherapy targets tumour-specific mutant antigens". Nature. 515 (7528). Springer Science and Business Media LLC: 577–581. Bibcode:2014Natur.515..577G. doi:10.1038/nature13988. ISSN 0028-0836. PMC 4279952. PMID 25428507.
- Chang, Chih-Hao; Qiu, Jing; O’Sullivan, David; Buck, Michael D.; Noguchi, Takuro; Curtis, Jonathan D.; Chen, Qiongyu; Gindin, Mariel; Gubin, Matthew M.; van der Windt, Gerritje J.W.; Tonc, Elena; Schreiber, Robert D.; Pearce, Edward J.; Pearce, Erika L. (2015). "Metabolic Competition in the Tumor Microenvironment Is a Driver of Cancer Progression". Cell. 162 (6). Elsevier BV: 1229–1241. doi:10.1016/j.cell.2015.08.016. ISSN 0092-8674. PMC 4864363. PMID 26321679. S2CID 10739910.
- Chang, Chih-Hao; Curtis, Jonathan D.; Maggi, Leonard B.; Faubert, Brandon; Villarino, Alejandro V.; O’Sullivan, David; Huang, Stanley Ching-Cheng; van der Windt, Gerritje J.W.; Blagih, Julianna; Qiu, Jing; Weber, Jason D.; Pearce, Edward J.; Jones, Russell G.; Pearce, Erika L. (2013). "Posttranscriptional Control of T Cell Effector Function by Aerobic Glycolysis". Cell. 153 (6). Elsevier BV: 1239–1251. doi:10.1016/j.cell.2013.05.016. ISSN 0092-8674. PMC 3804311. PMID 23746840.
- Pearce, Erika L.; Walsh, Matthew C.; Cejas, Pedro J.; Harms, Gretchen M.; Shen, Hao; Wang, Li-San; Jones, Russell G.; Choi, Yongwon (June 3, 2009). "Enhancing CD8 T-cell memory by modulating fatty acid metabolism". Nature. 460 (7251). Springer Science and Business Media LLC: 103–107. Bibcode:2009Natur.460..103P. doi:10.1038/nature08097. ISSN 0028-0836. PMC 2803086. PMID 19494812.
- van der Windt, Gerritje J.W.; Everts, Bart; Chang, Chih-Hao; Curtis, Jonathan D.; Freitas, Tori C.; Amiel, Eyal; Pearce, Edward J.; Pearce, Erika L. (2012). "Mitochondrial Respiratory Capacity Is a Critical Regulator of CD8+ T Cell Memory Development". Immunity. 36 (1). Elsevier BV: 68–78. doi:10.1016/j.immuni.2011.12.007. ISSN 1074-7613. PMC 3269311. PMID 22206904.

== See also ==
- Timeline of women in science
