= Rolf Kemler =

German molecular biologist

Rolf Kemler (born 13 February 1945), is a German molecular biologist who is currently the Emeritus Director at the Max Planck Institute of Immunobiology and Epigenetics. He has contributed significantly to the study of anchoring junctions, specifically the cadherin family of proteins and was the recipient of the 2020 Canada Gairdner International Award for his work in the field. In 2024 he received the Genetics and Molecular Biology in Germany Leader Award.
