= William B. Kannel =

American physician

William B. Kannel (December 13, 1923 in Brooklyn – August 20, 2011) was a former director of the Framingham Heart Study and a former head of the American Heart Association's Council of Epidemiology. He was among the recipients of the 1976 Gairdner Foundation International Award. He coined the term "risk factor", which first appeared in a 1961 article in Annals of Internal Medicine.
