= Alexander B. Gutman =

American medical researcher

Alexander B. Gutman (1902-1973) is a co-winner of the Gairdner Foundation International Award known for his research on gout.
