= Ruth Sanger =

Australian haematologist

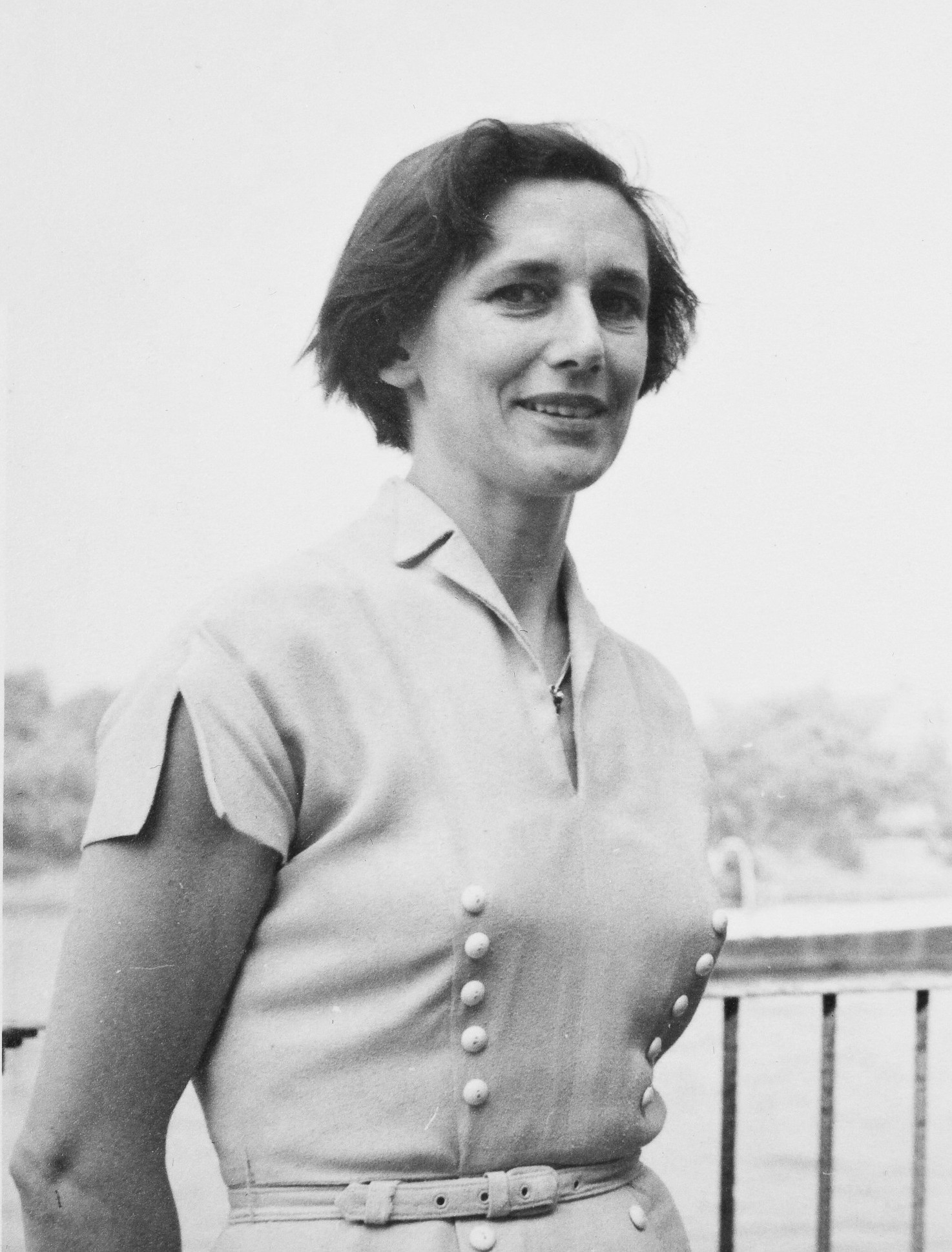
- Ruth Sanger c. 1950
- Born: Ruth Ann Sanger; 6 June 1918; Southport, Queensland, Australia
- Died: 4 June 2001 (aged 82); Putney, London, England
- Education: Sydney University; University of London
- Known for: Haematology, serology
- Spouse: Robert Russell Race (1956-1984)
- Relatives: Fred Sanger (first cousin)
- Awards: Gairdner Foundation International Award(1972)

Ruth Ann Sanger FRS (6 June 1918 – 4 June 2001) was an Australian immunogeneticist, haematologist and serologist. She was known for her work on human red cell antigens and for the genetic mapping of the human X chromosome. She was Director of the Medical Research Council Blood Group Unit, of the Lister Institute of Preventive Medicine from 1973 to 1983.

She worked closely with Robert Russell Race from the 1940s, and they married in 1956. They co-authored many papers after 1948, and co-wrote six editions of a leading work on blood groups, Blood Groups in Man, which helped make blood transfusions safer. The book was known as "Race and Sanger", which were published between 1950 and 1975.

== Education and early life ==
Sanger was born in Southport, Queensland, Australia and had four siblings. Her father, Rev. Hubert Sanger, became headmaster of Armidale School in New South Wales. She was first cousins with Frederick Sanger, the biochemist and two-time winner of the Nobel prize.

She received her early education in New South Wales at three schools: Harleyville Ladies College (1924–1926), New England Girls school, Armidale (1926–1927), and Abbotsleigh Wahrounga (1928–35).

She went on to receive a Bachelor of Science from Sydney University (1940), and earned a PhD from the University of London (1948).

== Career ==
From 1940 to 1946 she worked as a haematologist for the Red Cross Blood Transfusion Service in Sydney, Australia. In 1946, she moved to England to work with R.R. Race at the Medical Research Counsil (MRC), Blood Group Unit. While there, she received a doctorate from the University of London in 1948 on the variety of blood group systems. She returned to Australia after receiving her doctorate, but then moved permanently to the United Kingdom in 1950 and remained at the MRC until 1973.

The first edition of Blood Groups in Man was published in August 1950, based on the systematic analysis of blood groups in her PhD thesis.

In 1973, she succeeded R.R. Race as Director of the Medical Research Council's Blood Group Unit at the Lister Institute of Preventive Medicine in London. She retired in 1983.

== Honours and awards ==
- Karl Landsteiner Memorial Award, USA (1957), joint with R. R. Race
- Philip Levine Award, USA (1970), joint with R. R. Race
- Fellow of the Royal Society (FRS) (1972)
- Gairdner Foundation International Award (1972, Canada), joint with R. R. Race
- Oliver Memorial Award from the British Red Cross (1973)
- Received an honorary Doctor of Medicine (MD (Honoris Causa)) from the Helsinki University (1990)

Her nomination for the Royal Society reads:

Immunogeneticist and Member of the Scientific Staff of the Medical Research Council's Blood Group Unit at the Lister Institute of Preventivie Medicine in the University of London. Distinguished for her work on human red cell antigens and for the genetic mapping of the human X chromosome.

== Personal life ==
Sanger married Race on April 6, 1956 following the death of Race's first wife.

=== Death ===
Ruth Sanger died in Putney in 2001. She had three step-children.

== Selected publications ==
- Sanger, Ruth A. (1946-10). "The Incomplete Antibody : a Quantitative Aspect". Nature. 158 (4014): 487–487. doi:10.1038/158487a0. ISSN 1476-4687.
- Race, R. R.; Mourant, A. E.; Lawler, Sylvia D.; Sanger, Ruth (1948-06-01). "THE Rh CHROMOSOME FREQUENCIES IN ENGLAND". Blood. 3 (6): 689–695. doi:10.1182/blood.V3.6.689.689. ISSN 0006-4971.
- Sanger, Ruth (1955-12). "An Association Between the P And Jay Systems of Blood Groups". Nature. 176 (4494): 1163–1164. doi:10.1038/1761163a0. ISSN 1476-4687.
