= MRC Blood Group Unit =

Research unit of the British Medical Research Council

The MRC Blood Group Unit, originally the Blood Group Research Unit, was a research unit of the British Medical Research Council from 1946 to 1995. Initially established in the Lister Institute, it transferred to the Galton Laboratory (the Genetics department) of University College, London in 1975, the original home of its predecessor.

The unit mainly used serological techniques to discover blood group antigens. Only in the last 15 years of its existence were monoclonal antibodies and molecular approaches adopted. Blood groups were used to study many aspects of human genetics: including those related to blood transfusion, linkage analysis, mosaicism and chimaerism.

== Directors ==
- R.R. Race FRS, 1946–1973
- Ruth Sanger FRS, 1973–1983
- Dr Patricia Tippett, 1983–1995

== Scientific achievements ==
These are listed roughly in chronological order of the start of the research. Research on most topics was on-going with significant publications spanning several decades: for instance Xg was discovered in the early 1960s, but the unit contributed to the identification of the underlying gene, PBDX, in 1994.

- Elucidating the genetics of the Rhesus blood group. Director R.R. Race with R.A. Fisher had proposed the most widely accepted genetic nomenclature for the Rhesus system. Much of the early work of the unit was concerned with identifying genetic variants of this system which became possible after the initial discovery by Karl Landsteiner and the development of the Coombs test.
- Human Blood Groups in Man. A technical reference work written by the unit's first two directors. It was first published in 1950; its final, and 6th, edition appearing in 1975. For much of this period this was a standard reference work for Clinical Haematologists and Blood Transfusion centres.
- Refinement of the genetics of the MNS antigen system.
- Xg antigen system. This was the first X-linked blood group to be discovered in 1962, and led to extensive work over the following decades, usually with collaborators, to map genes on the human X chromosome.
- WHO Collaborative Centre for Human Blood Groups.
