= Asifa Akhtar =

German-Pakistani geneticist and cell biologist

- Born: Asifa Akhtar; Karachi, Pakistan
- Education: University College London (BSc) Imperial Cancer Research Fund (now part of The Francis Crick Institute) (PhD)
- Known for: Study of Chromatin Regulation, Basilicata-Akhtar Syndrome
- Awards: Leibniz Prize
- Scientific career
- Fields: Chromatin Regulation
- Workplaces: Max Planck Institute of Immunology and Epigenetics
- Doctoral advisor: Richard Treisman

Asifa Akhtar is a Germany-based biologist born in Pakistan, who has made significant contributions to the field of epigenetics, particularly chromatin regulation. She is Senior Group Leader and Director of the Department of Chromatin Regulation at the Max Planck Institute of Immunobiology and Epigenetics and Vice President of the Max Planck Society. Akhtar was awarded EMBO membership in 2013, membership in the German National Academy of Sciences Leopoldina in 2019, and the Royal Society foreign membership in 2025. She has also received the Leibniz Prize in 2021, the International Ellis Island Medal of Honor in 2023, and the Baden-Württemberg Order of Merit in 2026. Akhtar became the first international and female vice president of the Max Planck Society's Biology and Medicine Section in July 2020 and was re-elected for a second term in 2023. In 2022, Asifa Akhtar was appointed Honorary Professor of the Medical Faculty of the University of Freiburg.

== Academic career ==
Asifa Akhtar was born in Karachi, Pakistan, and studied biology at University College London. She graduated with a BSc in 1993 and took up doctoral studies at the Imperial Cancer Research Fund (now part of the Francis Crick Institute), investigating transcriptional regulation in the lab of Richard Treisman. She completed her PhD in 1997. Akhtar's postdoctoral studies in chromatin regulation were carried out in Peter Becker's lab at European Molecular Biology Laboratory (EMBL), Heidelberg and the Adolf Butenandt Institute, Munich. Akhtar became a Group Leader at EMBL in 2001, moving to the Max Planck Institute of Immunobiology and Epigenetics, Freiburg in 2009, where she heads her own lab in Chromatin Regulation. On July 1, 2020, she was elected Vice President of the Max Planck Society's Biology and Medicine Section as the first international woman to ever hold this position. In June 2023, Akhtar was re-elected as Vice President for a term of six years.

== Research interests ==
Asifa Akhtar's research focuses on the study of chromatin and epigenetic mechanisms. Akhtar's work has advanced our understanding of how gene expression is regulated through histone post-translational modifications and non-coding RNAs. Asifa Akhtar's research focuses on the lysine acetyltransferase MOF (also known as KAT8) and its two major protein assemblies, the male-specific lethal (MSL) complex and the non-specific lethal (NSL) complex, to uncover how epigenetic enzymes regulate gene expression through both chromatin-based and non-chromatin mechanisms.

Asifa Akhtar's laboratory focuses on the concept of gene dosage. Among her most influential contributions are her studies on the Drosophila melanogaster dosage compensation system, which balances X-linked gene expression between male and female fruit flies. Dosage compensation serves as a model for how targeted histone modifications can translate to large-scale transcriptional upregulation. Asifa Akhtar has made multiple discoveries into how the MSL complex is able to specifically localize to and subsequently hyperactivate the single male X chromosome to achieve transcriptional parity with the two X chromosomes in females. In order to understand this, a major effort in her lab has been to study the contribution of the long non-coding roX RNAs (roX1 and roX2) in male X-chromosome targeting.

Extending these concepts to mammals, Asifa Akhtar also showed that the MSL complex component MSL2 finetunes transcription of dosage-sensitive genes in mammals. MSL2 loss perturbs expression of several disease-associated haploinsufficient genes, preventing them from being able to achieve biallelic expression.

In collaboration with clinicians, Asifa Akhtar's team have furthermore uncovered that mutations in MSL complex members lead to human disease. They showed that mutations in MSL3 lead to Basilicata-Akhtar Syndrome and mutations in MSL2 lead to Karayol-Borroto-Haghshenas neurodevelopmental syndrome, both of which are classified as neurodevelopmental disorders.

Beyond transcriptional regulation, Asifa Akhtar's research has also uncovered diverse non-canonical roles for the MOF-containing complexes. Her group was able to show that MOF as part of the NSL complex acetylates prelamin-A/C to maintain nuclear lamina integrity as well as the mitochondrial protein COX17 to facilitate oxidative respiration.

In a separate line of research, Asifa Akhtar also studies the RNA helicase DHX9. Her work revealed a novel UV-induced RNA damage stress response, in which damaged RNAs are sequestered into cytoplasmic stress granules where the RNA helicase DHX9 is able to resolve double-stranded Alu elements to preserve the viability of daughter cells.

== Awards and honors ==
- 2008 Akhtar was the recipient of the early career European Life Science Organization Award.
- 2013 Akhtar was awarded EMBO membership.
- 2017 Akhtar was awarded the Feldberg Prize.
- 2019 Akhtar became a member of the German Academy of Sciences Leopoldina.
- 2021 Akhtar was awarded the Leibniz Prize.
- 2022 Akhtar received the Christa Šerić-Geiger Prize.
- 2023 Akhtar received the Ellis Island Medal of Honor.
- 2025 Akhtar received the EMBO|FEBS Women in Science Prize.
- 2025 Akhtar was elected Foreign Member of the British Royal Society.
- 2026 Akhtar received the Baden-Württemberg Order of Merit.
