= Xg antigen system =

Blood group system

Xg blood group
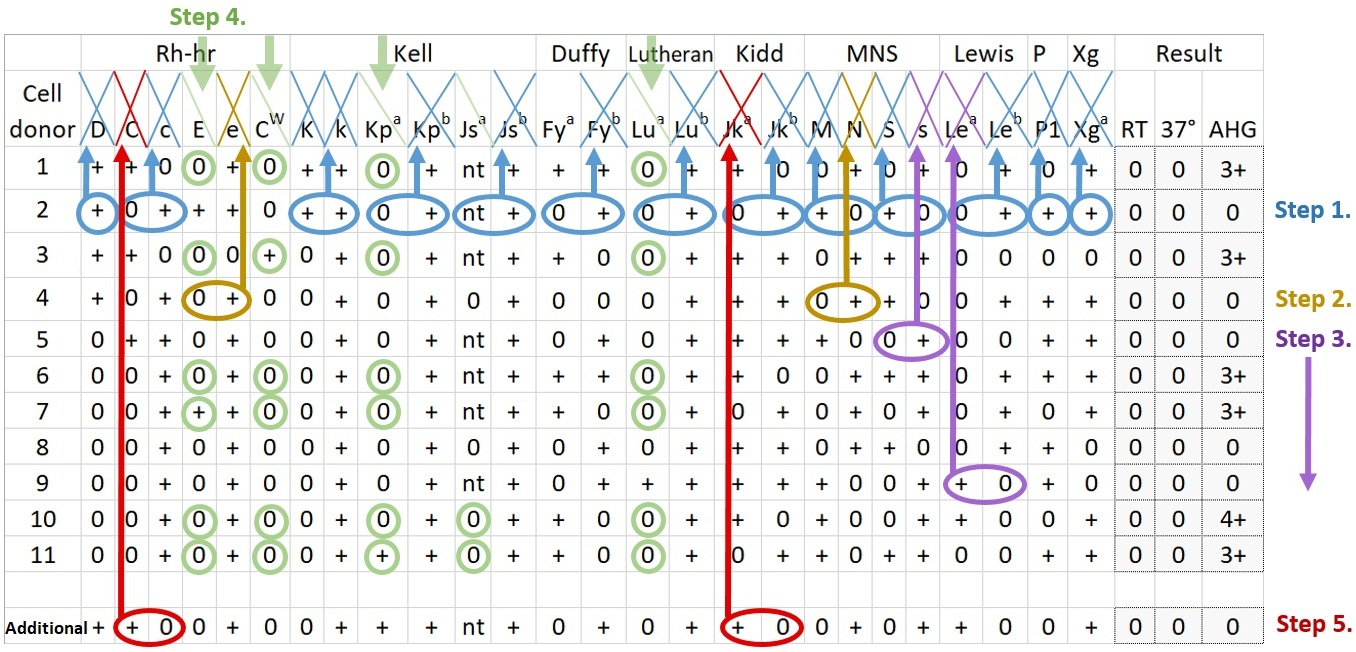
- Interpretation of antibody panel to detect patient antibodies towards the most relevant human blood group systems, including Xg.

Identifiers
- Symbol: XG
- Alt. symbols: PBDX
- NCBI gene: 7499
- HGNC: 12806
- RefSeq: NM_175569

Other data
- Locus: Chr. X p22.32

XG

Identifiers
- Aliases: XG, PBDX, Xg blood group, Xg glycoprotein (Xg blood group)
- External IDs: OMIM: 300879; GeneCards: XG

Gene location (Human)
Chr.	X chromosome (human)
Band	Xp22.33	Start	2,752,040 bp
Band	Xp22.33	End	2,816,500 bp
RNA expression pattern
Bgee	Human / Mouse (ortholog); Top expressed in: Achilles tendon; skin of hip; skin of leg; skin of abdomen; skin of thigh; tendon of biceps brachii; gingival epithelium; synovial membrane; secondary oocyte; synovial joint / n/a; More reference expression data
BioGPS	n/a
Gene ontology
Molecular function	molecular function
Cellular component	integral component of membrane; plasma membrane; integral component of plasma membrane; membrane
Biological process	biological process; homotypic cell-cell adhesion; T cell extravasation; positive regulation of neutrophil extravasation
Sources:Amigo / QuickGO
Orthologs
Databases	NCBI: entry; OMA: entry
Species	Human	Mouse
Entrez	7499	n/a
Ensembl	ENSG00000124343	n/a
UniProt	P55808	n/a
RefSeq (mRNA)	NM_001141919; NM_001141920; NM_175569	n/a
RefSeq (protein)	NP_001135391; NP_001135392; NP_780778	n/a
Location (UCSC)	Chr X: 2.75 – 2.82 Mb	n/a
PubMed search		n/a
- Wikidata
View/Edit Human

The XG antigen is a red blood cell surface antigen discovered in 1962 by researchers at the MRC Blood Group Unit.

The PBDX gene that encodes the antigen is located on the short arm of the X chromosome. Since males normally have one X chromosome they are considered hemizygotes. Since women have two copies of the gene and could be heterozygotic for the presence or absence of the functioning gene they could (through the process of lyonisation) express the functioning protein on just some of their red blood cells.

== Clinical diagnostic ==
Clinical testing in patient care for Xg antigens follows published minimum quality and operational requirements, similar to red cell genotyping for any of the other recognized blood group systems. Molecular analysis can identify gene variants (alleles) that may affect Xg antigens expression on the red cell membrane.

== Frequency ==
Population frequencies of X^{a}
Population	Sample; N	Xg _{%}
Australian Aborigines	352	79
Chinese, mainland	171	60
North Europeans	5,388	66
Indians, Bombay	100	65
Israelis	201	66
American Indians	308	77
New-Guineans	263	85
New York's Afro-Americans	219	55
Sardinians	322	76
Taiwan Chinese	178	53
Taiwan Aborigines	164	38
