= Anthony Mahowald =

Antony Mahowald is a molecular genetics and cellular biologist

Anthony Mahowald (born November 24, 1932) is a molecular genetics and cellular biologist who served as the department chair of the molecular genetics and cellular biology department at the University of Chicago. His lab focused on the fruit fly Drosophila melanogaster, specifically focusing on controlling the genetic aspects of major developmental events. His major research breakthroughs included the study of the stem cell niche, endocycles, and various types of actin.

== Personal life ==
Anthony Mahowald is married and has three children.

== Educational career ==
Anthony Mahowald was born in Albany, Minnesota, on November 24, 1932. Mahowald received a bachelor's degree from Spring Hill College in Mobile, Alabama. Following his undergraduate studies, Mahowald earned his Ph.D. from Johns Hopkins University in 1962. At Johns Hopkins, Mahowald studied the structure of pole cells and polar granules in Drosophila melanogaster. Both his undergraduate and doctoral degrees were in the field of biology.

== Professional career ==
Mahowald has worked in many universities in his academic career. From 1972 to 1982, he started his career at Marquette University, while also working for the Institute of Cancer Research in Philadelphia, Pennsylvania. Then, he accepted a position at Indiana University from 1972 to 1982. He then moved on to Case Western Reserve University from 1982 to 1990. Finally, from 1990 to 2002, Mahowald was employed at the University of Chicago as the department chair for molecular genetics and cellular biology. In 2002, he retired from academia and currently works as an emeritus at the University of Chicago.

=== Awards and associations ===
Mahowald is a member of a wide range of prestigious organizations. He is a part of the American Association for the Advancement of Science, Society of Scholars at Johns Hopkins University, American Academy of Arts and Sciences, the Woodrow Wilson Foundation, the Genetics Society of America, the American Society of Cell Biology, the Society of Developmental Biology, and the National Academy of Science.

=== Research and scientific contributions ===
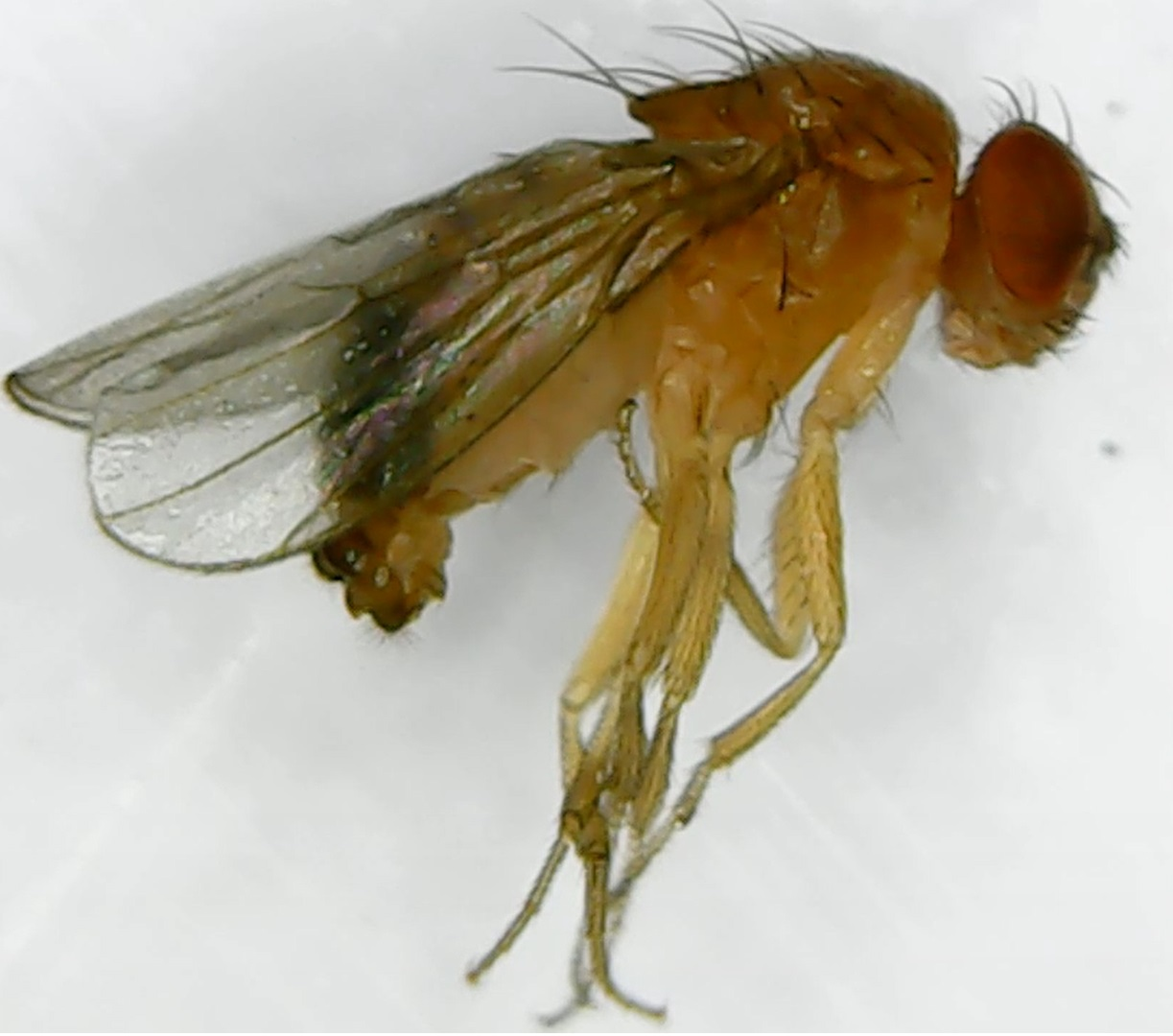
Drosophila melanogaster under microscope

The majority of his research centered around the common fruit fly and other insects for developmental and genetic studies.

One of Malhowald's groundbreaking articles involve the study of the stem cell niche, which is a specialized environment where adult stem cells reside in some insects and amphibians. This area helps to keep stem cells in an undifferentiated state through short-range signaling. Mahowald discovered that this area, and specifically the e-cadherin-based stem cell adhesion, is vital in maintaining the Drosophila germline stem cells. These stem cells are important to the reproduction of Drosophila as they turn into sperm cells. In Drosophila testicles, the Leukocyte-antigen-related (LAR) receptor tyrosine phosphatase targets selection and synapse formation with nerve cells. After testing, it was discovered that the receptor expression is increased in the analysis of testicles containing higher numbers of early germ cells and cyst cells. After analysis of this data and further testing of his own, Mahowald discovered that the LAR expressed in the testicles retains germline stem cells at the niche through the increased E-cadherin-based adhesion.

Some of Mahowald's most recent work centers around the study of endocycles. These are cell cycles that do not have a mitotic phase. In other words, cells continuously duplicate their genetic information without division into two cells. This creates very large cells, but their genetic information cannot be organized and separated into chromosomes due to inhibition of cyclin-dependent kinase activity. Mahowald discovered pre-mitotic endocycles in rectal non-cancerous polyploid cells in Drosophila. The endocycling creates a polyploid cell, and these polyploid have high error-rates, suggesting that there will be an accumulation of cells with incorrect number of chromosomes. He argues that pre-mitotic endocycling is essential for non-cancerous polyploid development, specifically in papillary development. While organisms would die from the accumulation of aneuploid, Mahowald found that, in this instance, significant changes in survival rates were not observed. Thus, he and his team directly disproved previous thoughts that aneuploidy decreases survivability in various insects, especially flies.

Mahowald also studied the actin and the various genes that code for very similar types of actin in an organism. Mahowald was concerned as to why organisms have multiple, very similar, genes that encode for the same proteins with only a few amino acids different. To attempt to answer this question, Mahowald and team isolated two actin genes, Act42A and Act5C, with only two amino acids being different between the two genes, and both are present in all cells in the Drosophila during development.

Other researchers had established that multiple isoforms are crucial for development. It was determined that the small differences make actin filaments that do have different functions, such as cytoplasmic functions and muscular functions. Indeed, Mahowald established that there is a need for multiple forms of actin due to the large quantity of actin needed in a cell, along with the fact that some cells have different microfilament-based needs. However, he set out to determine if these actin filaments could be interchanged due to their similarity in structure.

Mahowald focused on cytoplasmic actin genes instead of muscular actin due to the multifunctional nature of cytoplasmic actin when compared to muscular actin. Using genomic DNA and Reverse Transcription PCR Sequences, Mahowald determined that these amino acid substitutions in Act5C and Act42A did not occur in regions of the actin molecule where actin binding proteins interact. By using the Drosophila as an easily controlled genetic system, Mahowald and his team discovered that mutations in the Act5C gene caused organism death, indicating that Act5C did have an important and isolated function. However, a hybrid gene containing Act42A prevented organism death, indicating that the amino acid differences between the two isoforms are not significant. Despite all of this, Mahowald concluded that tissues rich in Act5C gene expression cannot adequately function with only the Act42A isoform. In other words, while very similar in genetic sequencing, the various isoforms of actin are important to the survivability and functionality of the Drosophila.
