= John R. Riordan =

Canadian biochemist

John Richard Riordan, OC (Also known as Jack) (born September 2, 1943, in St. Stephen, New Brunswick) is a Canadian biochemist, noted for his research into cystic fibrosis.

After acquiring his bachelor's degree in 1966 from the University of Toronto, he studied and received a doctorate in biochemistry from the same university in 1970. His next three years were spent at the Max Planck Institute for Biophysics in Frankfurt. He then returned to the University of Toronto, where he worked as a professor in the Biochemistry department from 1974. Prior to retiring in 2018, Riordan was a professor at the University of North Carolina at Chapel Hill where he was a member of the Biochemistry and Biophysics Department studying the structure and function of CFTR. He is also a visiting scientist at the Academy Salhgrenska (where he holds an honorary doctorate ) and University of Gothenburg.

He is mostly recognized for the first ever discovery of a mutated gene, ΔF508, that can cause cystic fibrosis. This research was undertaken alongside fellow biologists, Francis Collins and Lap-Chee Tsui and since then, other research has found over 1000 different mutations that can cause cystic fibrosis.

In 1990 he received the Gairdner Foundation International Award, 'for contributions to the identification of the gene for cystic fibrosis'.
