= Georges J. F. Köhler =

German biologist (1946–1995)

Georges Jean Franz Köhler
- Georges Jean Franz Köhler (right) with César Milstein
- Born: 17 April 1946; Munich, Allied-occupied Germany
- Died: 1 March 1995 (aged 48); Freiburg im Breisgau, Germany
- Known for: Monoclonal antibodies
- Spouse: Claudia Reintjes
- Awards: Nobel Prize in Physiology or Medicine (1984)
- Scientific career
- Fields: Biology; immunology
- Workplaces: Max Planck Institute of Immunobiology; MRC Laboratory of Molecular Biology
- Doctoral advisor: Fritz Melchers

Georges Jean Franz Köhler (German pronunciation: [ˈʒɔʁʃ ˈkøːlɐ]; 17 April 1946 – 1 March 1995) was a German biologist and immunologist who shared the 1984 Nobel Prize in Physiology or Medicine with César Milstein and Niels Kaj Jerne "for theories concerning the specificity in development and control of the immune system and the discovery of the principle for production of monoclonal antibodies". Köhler and Milstein developed the hybridoma technique, a method for producing monoclonal antibodies of predefined specificity by fusing antibody-producing B cells with immortal myeloma cells.

The technique became a foundational tool in immunology, cell biology, biotechnology, medical diagnostics and antibody-based therapeutics. Köhler later worked at the Basel Institute for Immunology and became director of the Max Planck Institute of Immunobiology in Freiburg im Breisgau, where he remained until his death in 1995.

== Early life and education ==
Köhler was born in Munich, Allied-occupied Germany, on 17 April 1946. His father, Karl Köhler, was German, while his mother, Raymonde, came from a French family. He studied biology at the University of Freiburg, where he worked under Fritz Melchers. His doctoral research concerned the immune response and antibody production, interests that led to his later work on the generation of antibody diversity.

== Work with César Milstein ==
From April 1974 to March 1976 Köhler carried out postdoctoral research at the MRC Laboratory of Molecular Biology in Cambridge, working in the laboratory of César Milstein. His fellowship was supported by the EMBO. Milstein's laboratory was investigating the mechanisms underlying antibody diversity, including how immune cells generate antibodies with different specificities.

Köhler and Milstein sought a way to obtain continuous cultures of cells that secreted antibodies of a single defined specificity. Their solution was to fuse antibody-producing lymphocytes from immunized animals with immortal myeloma cells, producing hybrid cells—later known as hybridomas—that combined antibody secretion with the capacity for continuous growth in culture. In 1975 they published "Continuous cultures of fused cells secreting antibody of predefined specificity" in Nature.

The hybridoma method provided a reproducible way to generate monoclonal antibodies, in contrast to conventional antisera, which contain mixtures of antibodies produced by many different immune-cell clones. Monoclonal antibodies could be made with uniform specificity, allowing researchers to identify, purify and measure particular molecules with high precision.

== Basel Institute for Immunology ==
In April 1976 Köhler returned to Switzerland as a member of the Basel Institute for Immunology, where he continued molecular and cellular work on lymphocyte hybrids. The institute, directed by Niels Kaj Jerne, was a major center for theoretical and experimental immunology. Köhler remained at Basel for approximately a decade, continuing to investigate antibody diversity and the behavior of lymphocyte hybrid cells.

During the early 1980s he also became interested in the use of transgenic mice to study immunological mechanisms, including self-tolerance.

== Nobel Prize ==
Köhler, Milstein and Jerne received the 1984 Nobel Prize in Physiology or Medicine. Jerne was recognized for theoretical work on the specificity, development and regulation of the immune system, while Köhler and Milstein were recognized for the discovery of the principle for producing monoclonal antibodies.

In his Nobel lecture, Köhler discussed the derivation and diversification of monoclonal antibodies and the scientific implications of the hybridoma technique. The discovery was also recognized by other awards, including the Albert Lasker Award for Basic Medical Research, which Köhler and Milstein received in 1984.

== Max Planck Institute of Immunobiology ==
In 1984 Köhler became director of the Max Planck Institute of Immunobiology in Freiburg im Breisgau. He also held an association with the University of Freiburg. At Freiburg he continued work in immunology, including studies of antibody formation, lymphocyte biology and experimental models for immune regulation.

Köhler remained director of the institute until his death.

== Personal life ==
Köhler married Claudia Reintjes in 1968. They had three children: Katharina, Lucia and Fabian. Biographical accounts describe him as devoted to his family as well as to scientific work; during his studies he reportedly worked as a taxi driver to support his family.

== Death ==
Köhler died in Freiburg im Breisgau on 1 March 1995 at the age of 48. Contemporary accounts attributed his death to a heart condition.

== Legacy ==
Köhler's collaboration with Milstein transformed experimental immunology by making it possible to produce antibodies of defined and reproducible specificity. Monoclonal antibodies became essential reagents in biomedical research and clinical diagnostics and later became a major class of therapeutic agents.

The hybridoma technique also helped shift immunology toward cell-based and molecular approaches, linking antibody specificity to individual lymphocyte clones and making antibodies practical tools for identifying biological molecules. The Max Planck Society has described Köhler as a pioneering immunologist whose work on monoclonal antibodies had enduring consequences for science and medicine.

== Selected publications ==
- Köhler, G.; Milstein, C. "Continuous cultures of fused cells secreting antibody of predefined specificity." Nature. 1975.
- Köhler, G. "The Nobel Lectures in Immunology. The Nobel Prize for Physiology or Medicine, 1984. Derivation and diversification of monoclonal antibodies." Scandinavian Journal of Immunology. 1992.

== See also ==
- Monoclonal antibody
- Hybridoma technology
- César Milstein
- Niels Kaj Jerne
- Basel Institute for Immunology
- Max Planck Institute of Immunobiology and Epigenetics
