= Ibrahim Cissé (academic) =

Nigerien-American biophysicist

Ibrahim I. Cissé
- Born: Niamey, Niger
- Education: North Carolina Central University; University of Illinois at Urbana–Champaign
- Known for: super-resolution imaging
- Awards: MacArthur Fellow
- Scientific career
- Workplaces: Caltech; MIT; École normale supérieure (Paris); Max Planck Institute
- Website: Cissé Laboratory

Ibrahim I. Cissé is a Nigerien-American biophysicist. He is currently director of the Max Planck Institute of Immunobiology and Epigenetics. Previously, Cissé was at the California Institute of Technology as Professor of Physics and the Massachusetts Institute of Technology as Professor of Physics and Biology. He has won several awards for his work, including in 2021 the MacArthur Fellowship.

Cissé's research focuses on live cell super-resolution imaging and single molecule characterisation.

== Early life and education ==
Cissé was born in Niamey, Niger. As a child he assumed that he would work in his father's law firm. He became interested in science through Hollywood films. In Niamey there were few opportunities to practise science as his school did not have a laboratory. He was keen to move to America to study, and completed high school two years early. He moved to the United States at the age of 17 to attend college. Cissé studied physics at the North Carolina Central University and graduated in 2004. During his undergraduate degree he was encouraged by Carl Wieman to apply for a fellowship, and spent a summer at Princeton University working in condensed matter physics. During this summer project he looked at jammed disordered packings, investigating how M&M's arrange in a small volume with Paul Chaikin. Cissé used various techniques to study jammed packings, including magnetic resonance imaging, but in the end used a much simpler approach - painting M&M's and analysing how many times they knocked into each other. The result was published in Science. He moved to Urbana for his graduate studies, and earned his PhD under the supervision of single molecule biophysicist Taekjip Ha at the University of Illinois at Urbana–Champaign in 2009. After completing his doctorate, Cissé joined the École Normale Supérieure in Paris. He worked as a Pierre Gilles de Gennes Fellow in the joint labs of a physicist, Maxime Dahan, and a biologist, Xavier Darzacq. He also held a long-term fellowship with the European Molecular Biology Organization. In Paris, Cissé developed the single-cell microscopy technique time-correlated photoactivated localization microscopy (tcPALM), allowing for time resolved measurements in vitro. Cissé used transient-PALM to demonstrated that RNA polymerase II forms clusters that deconstruct after their work is done. Until Cissé made this discovery it was assumed that RNA polymerases were stable.

== Research and career ==
Cissé moved back to America in 2013 and was appointed as a research specialist at the Howard Hughes Medical Institute. He worked in the Janelia Research Campus. Cissé was appointed to the physics department at Massachusetts Institute of Technology in 2014. He uses super-resolution microscopy to understand how genes are turned on and off. Gene activation involves that transcription of DNA information into molecules of RNA. This transcription involves the enzyme RNA polymerase.

Cissé used transient-PALM to demonstrate that the lifetime of a RNA polymerase cluster impacts how many RNA messages are sent from a gene. He showed that clusters of almost 100 RNA polymerases form for around 10 seconds close to the sites of activating genes. He has studied molecules of proteins in mouse embryonic stem cells. To do this, Cissé tagged the proteins with fluorescent emitters and then studied them with the microscope. His innovation demonstrated that the proteins involved in turning on genes join into a phase-separated droplet before they start to copy DNA into RNA.

On September 8, 2020, the Vilcek Foundation announced that Cissé was the recipient of a 2021 Vilcek Prize for Creative Promise in Biomedical Science for using super-resolution biological imaging to directly visualize the dynamic nature of gene expression in living cells.

Cissé was awarded tenure at Massachusetts Institute of Technology in 2020.

In early 2021, Cissé was appointed Professor of Physics at the California Institute of Technology. Later in the same year, he joined the Max Planck Institute of Immunobiology and Epigenetics as director. At Max Planck, he has started his own lab, Laboratory Ibrahim Cissé, whose main goal is to study the molecular events that occur when genes are switched on inside living cells. Cissé and his team does this using quantitative live cell imaging using state of the art equipment.

== Awards and honours ==
- 2021 MacArthur Fellowship
- 2021 Vilcek Prize for Creative Promise in Biomedical Science
- 2018 Science News SN10: Scientists to Watch.
- 2017 Biophysical Society Horiba Young Fluorescence Investigator Award
- 2017 Pew Scholar in Biomedical Sciences
- 2014 National Institutes of Health New Innovator Award
- 2022 Honoree by the Carnegie Corporation of New York's Great Immigrant Award.
- 2024 EMBO Member
