= Thomas Jenuwein =

German scientist

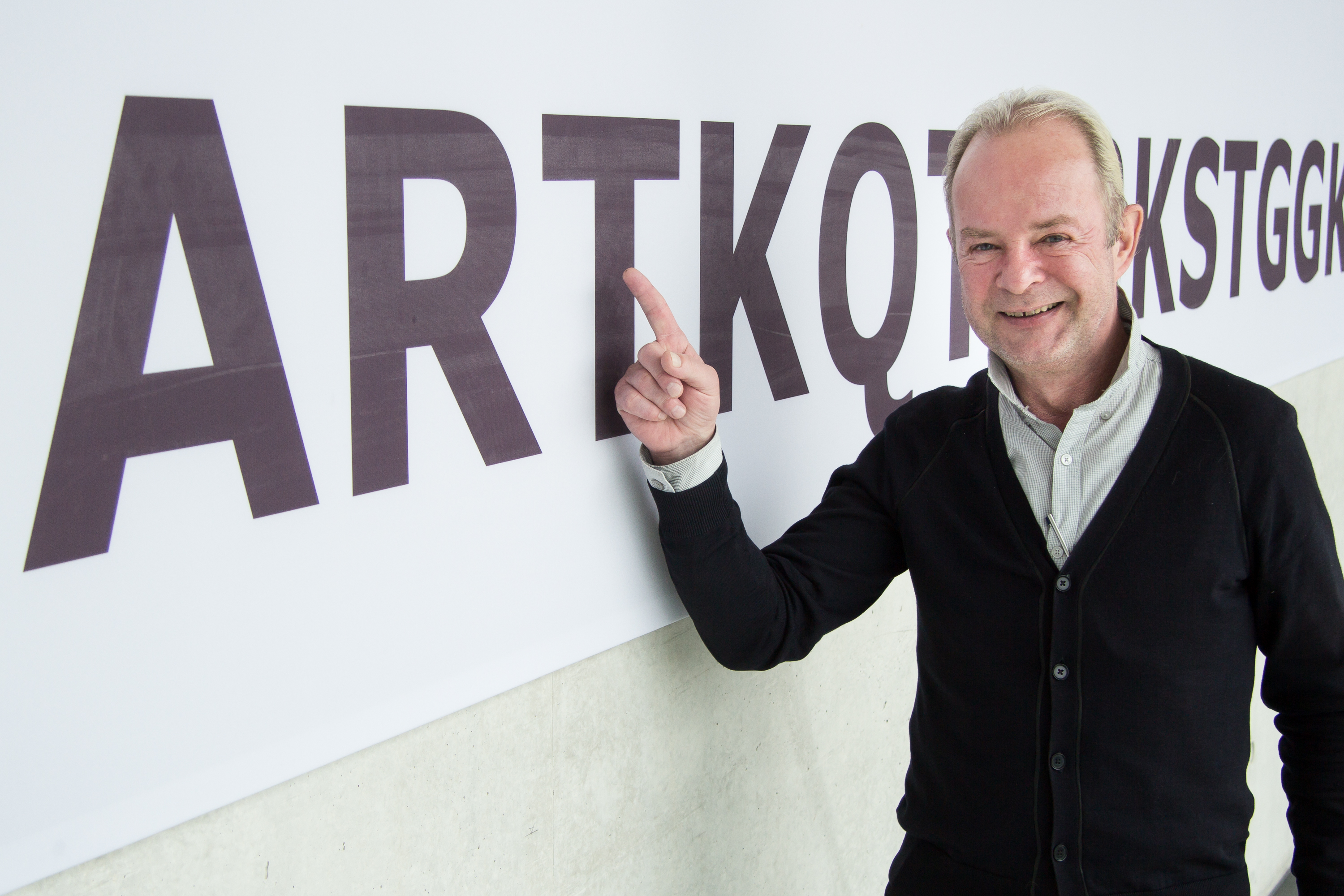
- April 2019
- Born: 10 December 1956 (age 69); Lohr am Main, Germany
- Education: EMBL, Heidelberg
- Scientific career
- Fields: Epigenetics
- Workplaces: UCSF, Research Institute of Molecular Pathology, Max Planck Institute of Immunobiology and Epigenetics
- Website: www.ie-freiburg.mpg.de/jenuwein

Thomas Jenuwein (born 1956) is a German scientist working in the fields of epigenetics, chromatin biology, gene regulation and genome function.

== Biography ==
Thomas Jenuwein received his Ph.D. in molecular biology in 1987 from the EMBL, working on fos oncogenes in the laboratory of Rolf Müller and the University of Heidelberg and performed postdoctoral studies (1987-1993) on the immunoglobulin heavy chain (IgH) enhancer with Rudolf Grosschedl at the University of California San Francisco (UCSF). As an independent group leader (1993-2002) and then as a senior scientist (2002-2008) at the Research Institute of Molecular Pathology (IMP) in Vienna, he focused his research to chromatin regulation. Through this work, he and his team discovered the first histone lysine methyltransferase (KMT) that was published in 2000. He is currently director at the Max Planck Institute of Immunobiology and Epigenetics in Freiburg, Germany where he heads the Department of Epigenetics. From 2004 to 2009, he coordinated the EU-funded network of excellence 'The Epigenome' , which connected more than 80 laboratories in Europe. Jenuwein is also co-editor of the first textbook on 'Epigenetics' that was published by Cold Spring Harbor Laboratory Press in 2007 and 2015. He is an ambassador for the dissemination of Science and is actively engaged with public lectures and radio and TV documentations to inform lay audiences about 'Epigenetics'.

== Career and research ==
Chromatin is the physiological template of our genetic information, the DNA double helix. The basic subunits of chromatin, the histone proteins, function in the packaging of the DNA double helix and in controlling gene expression through a variety of histone modifications. When Jenuwein started his chromatin work in late 1993, no enzymes for histone modifications were known. He and his team cloned and characterized mammalian orthologs of dominant Drosophila PEV modifier factors containing the evolutionarily conserved SET domain, originally identified by the laboratory of Gunter Reuter. The SET domain is present in Su(var)3–9, Enhancer of zeste and Trithorax proteins, all of which had been implicated in epigenetic regulation without evidence of enzymatic activity. Overexpression of human SUV39H1 modulated the distribution of histone H3 phosphorylation during the cell cycle in a SET domain dependent manner. This insight, together with refined bioinformatic interrogation revealing a distant relationship of the SET domain with plant methyltransferases, suggested the critical experiment: to test recombinant SUV39H1 for KMT activity on histone substrates. This experiment revealed robust catalytic activity of the SET domain of recombinant SUV39H1 to methylate histone H3 in vitro and was shown to be selective for the histone H3 lysine 9 position (H3K9me3). This seminal discovery identified the first histone lysine methyltransferase for eukaryotic chromatin. An important follow-up discovery was to show that SUV39H1-mediated H3K9 methylation generates a binding site for the chromodomain of heterochromatin protein 1 (HP1). Together, these landmark findings established a biochemical pathway for the definition of heterochromatin and characterized Suv39h-dependent H3K9me3 as a central epigenetic modification for the repression of transcriptional activity. The in vivo function of the Suv39h KMT was demonstrated by the analysis of Suv39h double-null mice, which display chromosome segregation defects and develop leukemia. Together with Boehringer Ingelheim, he identified the first small molecule inhibitor for KMT enzymes via screening of a chemical library. During the following years, Jenuwein then addressed the function of heterochromatin towards transcriptional regulation and genomic organization, with a particular focus on the analysis of the non-coding genome. An initial map of the mouse epigenome was established by a cluster analysis of repressive histone modifications across repeat sequences and provided an important framework well ahead of the deep-sequencing advances in the profiling of epigenomes. Genome-wide maps for Suv39h-dependent H3K9me3 marks and Hiseq RNA sequencing revealed a novel role for the Suv39h KMT in the silencing of repeat elements (e.g. LINE and ERV retrotransposons) in mouse embryonic stem cells. The demonstration that the pericentric major satellite repeats have embedded transcription factor (TF) binding sites that are relevant for TF-mediated recruitment of Suv39h enzymes has provided a general targeting mechanism for the formation of heterochromatin. Most recent work has identified that repeat RNA transcripts from the major satellite repeats largely remain chromatin associated and form an RNA-nucleosome scaffold that is supported by RNA:DNA hybrids.

== Significance and impact ==
The impact of the discovery of the first KMT and its associated functions has been so broad that it stimulated novel lines of research spanning nearly all aspects of chromatin biology and epigenetic control for both basic and applied questions. The definition of heterochromatin by the SUV39H1-H3K9me3-HP1 system has proven to be valid across nearly all model organisms. It allowed the functional dissection between histone and DNA methylation and integrated the RNAi silencing pathway with H3K9 methylation. Histone lysine methylation has opened molecular insights for the organization of the inactive X chromosome, telomeres and the rDNA cluster and is a crucial mechanism for Polycomb- and Trithorax-mediated gene regulation. Histone lysine methylation marks also defined bivalent chromatin in embryonic stem cells and are instructive chromatin modifications that are used for epigenomic profiling in normal vs. diseased cells. They were also a crucial prerequisite for the later discoveries of histone demethylases (KDM). With all of these mechanistic insights, novel approaches in cancer biology, complex human disorders, cell senescence and reprogramming have become possible. Since histone lysine methylation marks (as well as the other histone modifications) are reversible, their enzymatic systems represent ideal targets for novel drug discovery programs that have greatly advanced epigenetic therapy. The response of chromatin to environmental signals and its possible epigenetic inheritance via the germ line is most likely also regulated, at least in part, by histone lysine methylation.

== Honors and awards ==
Jenuwein is a member of several learned societies, such as the European Molecular Biology Organization, Academia Europaea, the Austrian Academy of Sciences and the American Academy of Arts and Sciences. He was awarded an Honorary Professorship at the University of Vienna (2003) and a co-opting professorship with appointment at the Medical Faculty of the University of Freiburg (2010). In 2005, he obtained the Sir Hans Krebs Medal of the FEBS Society and in 2007 the Erwin Schrödinger Prize of the Austrian Academy of Sciences.

- 1990–1993 Special fellow of the Leukemia Society of America
- 2002 Elected member of EMBO
- 2002–2007 Member Faculty of 1000 (Nuclear Structure and Function)
- 2003 Honorary Professorship in Epigenetics at Vienna University
- 2005 Sir Hans Krebs Medal of FEBS Society
- 2007 Erwin Schrödinger Prize, Austrian Academy of Sciences
- 2010 Co-opting Professorship, Medical Faculty, University of Freiburg
- 2013 Member of Academia Europaea
- 2017 Elected corresponding member of the Austrian Academy of Sciences
- 2019 International Member of the American Academy of Arts and Sciences
