= Jack Fishman =

Polish-born Jewish-American pharmaceutical researcher (1930–2013)

Jack Fishman (September 27, 1930 – December 7, 2013), born Jacob Fiszman, was a Jewish-American pharmaceutical researcher from Kraków, Poland. In 1961, along with Mozes J. Lewenstein, he developed the medication naloxone, which can reverse an opioid overdose, and the Centers for Disease Control and Prevention has described as a "a life-saving medication that can reverse an overdose from opioids—including heroin, fentanyl, and prescription opioid medications."

== Personal life ==
He fled the Nazi occupation of Poland with his parents when he was eight and spent much of his youth in Shanghai, where he attended a Jewish school. He immigrated to the United States at age 18.

He was married four times, with three marriages ending in divorce. He married Joy Stampler, whose son from a previous relationship died of an opioid overdose in 2003. Joy Stampler Fishman had no idea that naloxone existed or that carrying it would have saved her son, let alone that her current husband had helped invent the medication. Ms. Stampler Fishman described the incident as "the irony of my life."

== Career ==
Fishman studied chemistry at Yeshiva University, graduating in 1950. He received a master’s degree from Columbia University two years later and a doctorate in chemistry in 1955 from Wayne State University in Detroit, Michigan.

He later worked at the Sloan-Kettering Institute for Cancer Research, as it was known then, but also worked part time at a private pharmaceutical lab run by Mozes J. Lewenstein. Together, they developed and patented naloxone in 1961, which was approved by the Food and Drug Administration in 1971.

Fishman is also known for his research on steroids and estrogen, including the role it can play in breast cancer development.

He taught at the Albert Einstein College of Medicine of Yeshiva University and served as director of the Institute for Steroid Research at Montefiore Medical Center in the Bronx. He became director of the biochemical endocrinology lab at Rockefeller University and served as director of research at the Strang-Cornell Institute for Cancer Research until relatively recent to his death.

He became president of the Miami, Florida pharmaceutical firm Ivax Corporation and was a consultant to the World Health Organization and the National Science Foundation.
