= Gary Struhl =

American research scientist

Gary Struhl is an American research scientist whose primary areas of research are developmental biology and genetics and genomics. He works as a professor at Columbia University Medical Center, teaching neuroscience within the Department of Genetics and Development.

== Personal life and education ==
Struhl obtained his undergraduate degree from the Massachusetts Institute of Technology. He received his doctorate from the University of Cambridge in the United Kingdom, and then he completed his postdoctoral fellowships both at the University of Cambridge and at Harvard University. He serves as a professor at Columbia University Medical Center in the Department of Genetics and Development in neuroscience. He is married to Iva Greenwald.

Gary Struhl has a brother, Kevin Struhl, who was also recognized as a member of the National Academy of Sciences. Both Gary and Kevin studied at MIT for their undergraduate degrees, but Gary attended Cambridge for his doctorate degree while Kevin completed his studies at Stanford University. Both did postdoctoral research at Cambridge, but their research differs, as Kevin works on eukaryotic gene regulation.

== Research ==
Struhl has his own lab at Columbia University, the Struhl Lab at Columbia's Mortimer B. Zuckerman Mind Brain Behavior Institute. A large portion of Struhl's research centers around the common fruit fly, or Drosophila, and the developmental genetics surrounding this type of insect. He was accepted into the American Academy of Arts and Sciences in 2005 and into the National Academy of Sciences for cellular and developmental biology in 2008.

In 1999, Struhl published a paper looking at the frizzled and frizzed2 proteins of Drosophila. For this paper, the amber mutation of fz2 was isolated to look at its effects on signal transduction. It was concluded that fz2 is a primary receptor of Wg in Drosophila and that without f2 or fz2, signal transduction was not able to occur. Struhl also published a paper relating to frizzled function that analyzed the planar cell polarity of epithelial cells. In this paper, it was concluded that each of the cells has a mechanism that allows it to estimate the amount of asymmetric bridges, occurring between Stan and Stan plus Fz, that act as the link with neighboring cells. This mechanism was thought to be the method of reading the local slope of tissue-wide gradients of Fz activity, and that through this, all of the cells come to point in one direction.

Further research by Struhl and his associates was done into the control of Drosophila wing growth and its unified mechanism. This paper concluded that Decapentaplegic (Dpp, a BMP) and Wingless (Wg, a Wnt) act together through a common mechanism in order to control wing growth as a function of morphogen range.

Struhl's work with Epsin can be seen in a two decade span of several papers. His first major paper regarding Epsin was written in 2004, titled "Drosophila Epsin mediates a select endocytic pathway that DSL ligands must enter to activate Notch". This paper proposed that Epsin was essential for cell signaling because it "targets mono-ubiquitinated DSL proteins to an endocytic recycling compartment that they must enter to be converted into active ligands". Additionally, he proposed that Epsin "may be required to target mono-ubiquitinated DSL proteins to a particular subclass of coated pits that have special properties essential for Notch activation". These two parts of the hypotheses were further tested and developed in some of Struhl's more recent work and publications. He co-authored a paper that discussed Notch Activation by ligand endocytosis, and looked at the force exerted by the ligand on the notch. In this paper, he stated that there were two models, the recycling models and the pulling models, that could help explain the requirement that the ligand must be endocytosed by Epsin in signal-sending cells.

Another of Struhl's papers investigated the requirement of the ligands to be endocytosed so that the Notch in signal-receiving cells could be activated. The experiments and research of this paper supported and further extended their hypothesis from an earlier paper, showing that the mono-ubiquitination of the DSL proteins was essential for gaining access to the pathway that allows them to activate Notch.

Struhl co-authored a paper in which he discussed the three roles for notch in Drosophila R7 photoreceptor specification. In this paper, he wrote that the three distinct roles were to block photoreceptor differentiation, to enable the R7 cell to receive R8's RTK signal to override the block from the first role, and to specify that the cell is an R7 and not an R1/6.

A research article published by Struhl in the American Academy of Arts and Sciences journal looked at the relationship between epigenetic states and inheritance of cis-acting chromatin modifications. The key nucleosome in question was the H3K27me nucleosome. The paper concluded that H3K27me was a determinant of epigenetic memory, and that PRE-associated PRC2 propagates the mark as a requirement for perpetuating the memory. In further research looking into the controls of Drosophila wing size, Struhl explored the mechanisms that limit growth as a function of time. Two constraints were identified that prevent the wing from further growth once it meets its intended size goal at the end of larval growth. These two factors were an intrinsic limit on the spread of morphogen and the capacity of ecdysone, a steroid hormone, to gate the ability of these wing cells to grow as a response to morphogen.

Struhl along with research associates looked at the activation thresholds of C. elegans Notch proteins LIN-12 and GLP-1. This article discussed the fact that Epsin is not required for Notch signaling in the species C. elegans, which means that greater force is now necessary to expose the cleavage site, and that the NRRs of these proteins are tuned to a lower force threshold.

== Controversy ==
In 2004, Struhl was involved in a controversy regarding research on Wnt signaling, which is a major pathway in human cancer and embryonic development. A postdoc named Siu-Kwong Chan performed experiments that came to the conclusion that the beta-catenin or Armadillo could transduce Wnt signals without entering the nucleus. Struhl attempted to replicate this experiment, but received opposite results for important aspects of the experiment. When he reached out to Chan, Chan admitted that large portions of the data had either been fabricated or was not performed. Because of this, Struhl had the paper retracted and Chan lost his position at Albert Einstein College of Medicine. Many came to Struhl's defense, arguing that he was put in a very challenging position, but had no knowledge of this fraud, and that it was an unfortunate lesson for him to learn.
