= Iva Greenwald =

American biologist

Iva Susan Greenwald
- Education: MIT
- Scientific career
- Workplaces: MRC Laboratory of Molecular Biology; Princeton University; Columbia University
- Thesis: Genetic studies of muscle structure and cell lineage in Caenorhabditis elegans (1982)

Iva Susan Greenwald is an American biologist who is Professor of Cell and Molecular Biology at Columbia University. She studies cell-cell interactions and cell fate specification in C. elegans. She is particularly interested in LIN-12/Notch proteins, which are the receptor of one of the major signalling systems that determine the fate of cells.

== Early life and education ==
Greenwald joined MIT as a graduate student in 1977. She was trained in the classics of molecular biology and developmental genetics. That year, H. Robert Horvitz joined the faculty at MIT, and convinced her to investigate C. elegans. She started working on genetics, and functional redundancy cell-lineage mutants. She moved to the MRC Laboratory of Molecular Biology in 1983 where she worked alongside Jonathan Hodgkin, Gary Ruvkun and Victor Ambros, who encouraged her to try to clone LIN-12. It took her two years to develop a strategy to clone LIN-12 (Tc1 transposon tagging), and she identified that that genetic sequence contained epidermal growth factor (EGF) motifs. These investigations were amongst the first to show that worm developmental genes could be cloned, and that aspects of these genes were homologous to human proteins.

== Research and career ==
In 1986, Greenwald joined the faculty at Princeton University. She moved to Columbia University in 1993 and became a professor two years later. Greenwald dedicated her career to understanding the mechanisms that underpin the LIN-12/Notch signalling system. LIN-12/Notch proteins mediate cell-cell interactions. Amongst these processes, Greenwald studies the role of LIN-12/Notich in binary regulation, feedback mechanisms and signal transduction. She has identified new genes that are involved with the modulation of LIN-12/Notch in development and disease.

== Awards and honors ==
- 1983 Jane Coffin Childs Memorial Fund Postdoctoral Fellow
- 1986 NIH Postdoctoral Fellow
- 1987 Searle Scholar
- 1988 DuPont Young Faculty Award
- 1994 Howard Hughes Medical Institute Investigator
- 1998 Metropolitan Life Foundation Promising Investigator Award
- 2005 Elected to the American Academy of Arts and Sciences
- 2005 Elected to the U.S. National Academy of Sciences
- 2012 Ellison Medical Research Foundation Senior Scholar Award
- 2025 Wiley Prize in Biomedical Sciences.

== Selected publications ==
- G Struhl; I Greenwald (8 April 1999). "Presenilin is required for activity and nuclear access of Notch in Drosophila". Nature. 398 (6727): 522–5. doi:10.1038/19091. ISSN 1476-4687. PMID 10206646. Wikidata Q28141718.
- Levitan D; Greenwald I (1 September 1995). "Facilitation of lin-12-mediated signalling by sel-12, a Caenorhabditis elegans S182 Alzheimer's disease gene". Nature. 377 (6547): 351–354. doi:10.1038/377351a0. ISSN 1476-4687. PMID 7566091. Wikidata Q34296093.
- Greenwald IS; Sternberg PW; Horvitz HR (1 September 1983). "The lin-12 locus specifies cell fates in Caenorhabditis elegans". Cell. 34 (2): 435–444. doi:10.1016/0092-8674(83)90377-x. ISSN 0092-8674. PMID 6616618. Wikidata Q34264575.

== Personal life ==
Greenwald is married to Gary Struhl.
