= Thomas Boehm (biologist) =

German immunologist

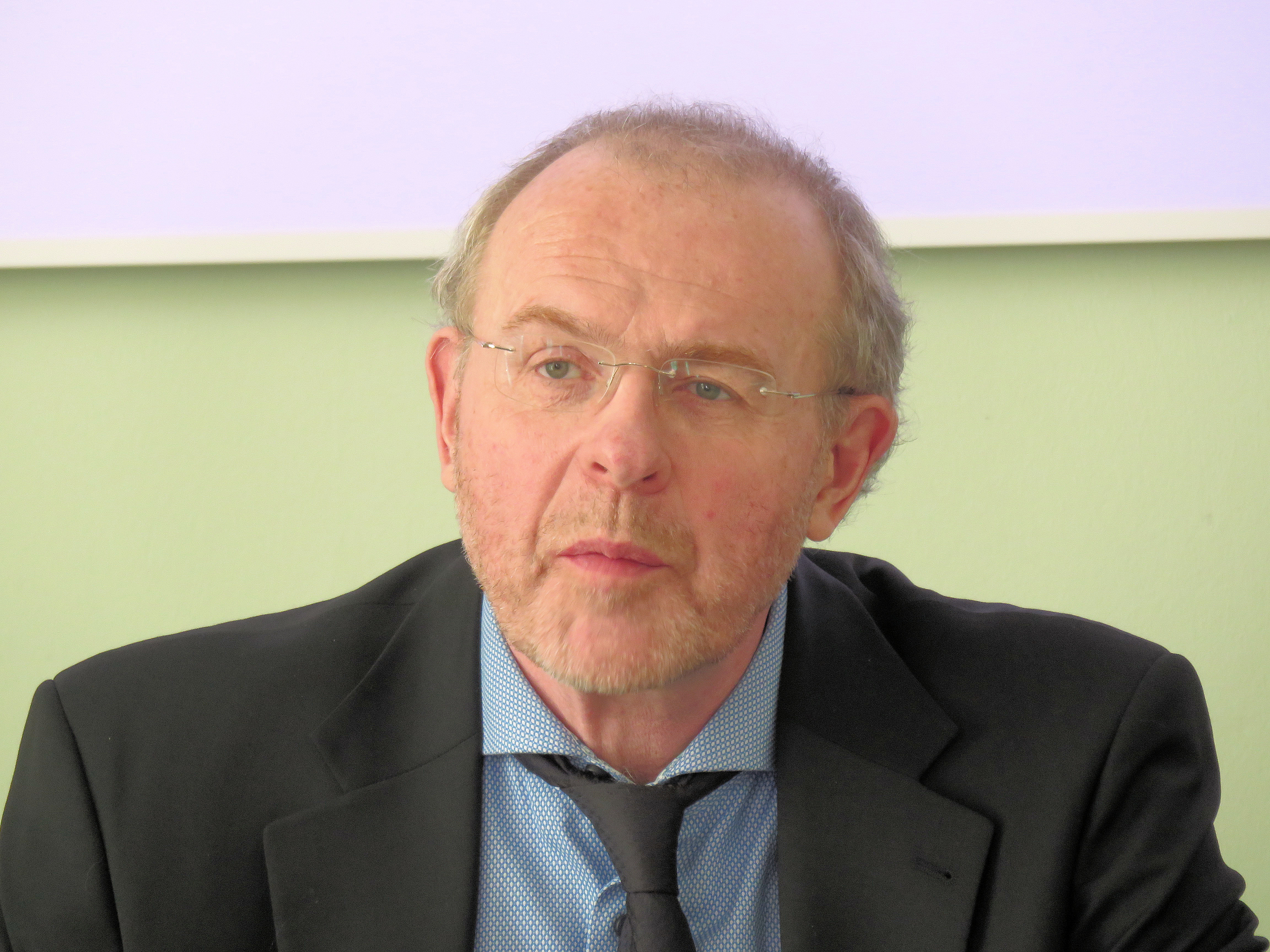
Boehm in 2018

Thomas Boehm (born 21 July 1956 in Gelnhausen) is a German immunologist. He is a Director of the Max Planck Institute for Immunobiology and Epigenetics in Freiburg im Breisgau. He has won a variety of prizes for his research work.

== Life ==
Boehm completed his medical studies at the Goethe University Frankfurt. He received his doctorate in 1982 and then worked as a research assistant in paediatrics and biochemistry at Frankfurt University Hospital. In 1988 he qualified as a professor of biochemistry. From 1987 to 1991 he was a visiting researcher and then a research associate at the Laboratory of Molecular Biology of Cambridge University. In 1991 he received a professorship at the Albert Ludwigs University of Freiburg and in 1994 a joint professorship at Heidelberg University and the German Cancer Research Center in Heidelberg. Since 1998 he has been a director at the Max Planck Institute for Immunobiology and Epigenetics in Freiburg im Breisgau.

== Research ==
Boehm deals with the evolution of the immune system, the development of the thymus and the relationships between lymphocytes and the interstitium. He was able to achieve groundbreaking advances in the study of the thymus. With the help of comparative studies of different animal species, essential properties of the immune systems of all vertebrates could be identified – in particular the structure of the immune system and the basis of its adaptability. Control mechanisms that cause the maturation and differentiation of immune cells were elucidated in his laboratory. Experiments with the production of artificial thymus glands have also been successful. More recent work deals with the development and function of genetic networks that are required for immune tolerance in antigen detection in vertebrates and invertebrates.

Boehm has been Chairman of the Board of Trustees of the Paul Ehrlich Foundation since 2018.

== Selected works ==
=== Books ===
- Boehm, Thomas (2008). "Thymus development and function". Current Opinion in Immunology. 20 (2). Elsevier BV: 178–184. doi:10.1016/j.coi.2008.03.001. ISSN 0952-7915. PMID 18403191.

=== Articles ===
- Bajoghli, Baubak; Aghaallaei, Narges; Hess, Isabell; Rode, Immanuel; Netuschil, Nikolai; Tay, Boon-Hui; Venkatesh, Byrappa; Yu, Jr-Kai; Kaltenbach, Stacy L.; Holland, Nicholas D.; Diekhoff, Dagmar; Happe, Christiane; Schorpp, Michael; Boehm, Thomas (2009). "Evolution of Genetic Networks Underlying the Emergence of Thymopoiesis in Vertebrates". Cell. 138 (1). Elsevier BV: 186–197. doi:10.1016/j.cell.2009.04.017. ISSN 0092-8674. PMID 19559469. S2CID 1803223.
- Boehm, Thomas; Hess, Isabell; Swann, Jeremy B. (2012). "Evolution of lymphoid tissues". Trends in Immunology. 33 (6). Elsevier BV: 315–321. doi:10.1016/j.it.2012.02.005. ISSN 1471-4906. PMID 22483556.
- Boehm, Thomas; McCurley, Nathanael; Sutoh, Yoichi; Schorpp, Michael; Kasahara, Masanori; Cooper, Max D. (23 April 2012). "VLR-Based Adaptive Immunity". Annual Review of Immunology. 30 (1). Annual Reviews: 203–220. doi:10.1146/annurev-immunol-020711-075038. ISSN 0732-0582. PMC 3526378. PMID 22224775.

== Awards and distinctions ==
- 1987 Research Prize of the Kind Phillips Foundation for Leukemia Research (with Dusan Drahovsky) for Investigations into the genetic heterogeneity of human leukemia by analyzing the DNA arrangements of immunoglobulin genes, T cell receptor genes and cellular oncogenes
- 1997 Gottfried Wilhelm Leibniz Prize
- 2002 member of the European Molecular Biology Organization
- 2002 member of the German National Academy of Sciences Leopoldina
- 2012 member of the Heidelberg Academy of Sciences and Humanities
- 2014 Ernst Jung Prize for Medicine
- 2020 German Immunology Prize
- 2021 Member of the American Academy of Arts and Sciences
- 2021 Heinrich Wieland Prize
