= Irene Li =

Boston based chef and restaurateur

Irene Shiang Li is a Boston-based chef and restaurateur and a winner of a 2022 James Beard Leadership Award. The youngest person to win the award (32), Li is also a six time finalist in the Rising Star Chef category.

A self taught chef, Li founded Mei Mei as a food truck, Mei Mei Street Kitchen, with brother Andrew and sister Margaret in 2012. Mei Mei means little sister in Mandarin. They opened Mei Mei Restaurant a year later in 2013, and Mei Mei now operates as a dumpling company, teaching virtual classes and selling packaged dumplings at farmers markets with their headquarters in South Boston. In 2020 at the start of the COVID-19 pandemic, Li co-founded Project Restore Us with Marena Lin, Lily Huang and Tracy Chang, which is a nonprofit that sought to use the restaurant supply chain to help feed immigrant and working-class families.

In 2022, Irene co-founded Prepshift, a coaching, consulting, and workforce training business with Dylan Gully and Carla Cornejo. Originally created as an online tool to help restaurant owners run their businesses, Prepshift is also a technical assistance partner to the City of Boston, City of Cambridge, and other entities.

Irene Li is the daughter of medical scientist Frederick Pei Li and granddaughter of Li Hanhun, a military general, and Wu Chu-Fang, a restaurateur. Along with her sister Margaret, she is the co-author of Perfectly Good Food from W.W. Norton.
