= Ming Tsai =

American chef

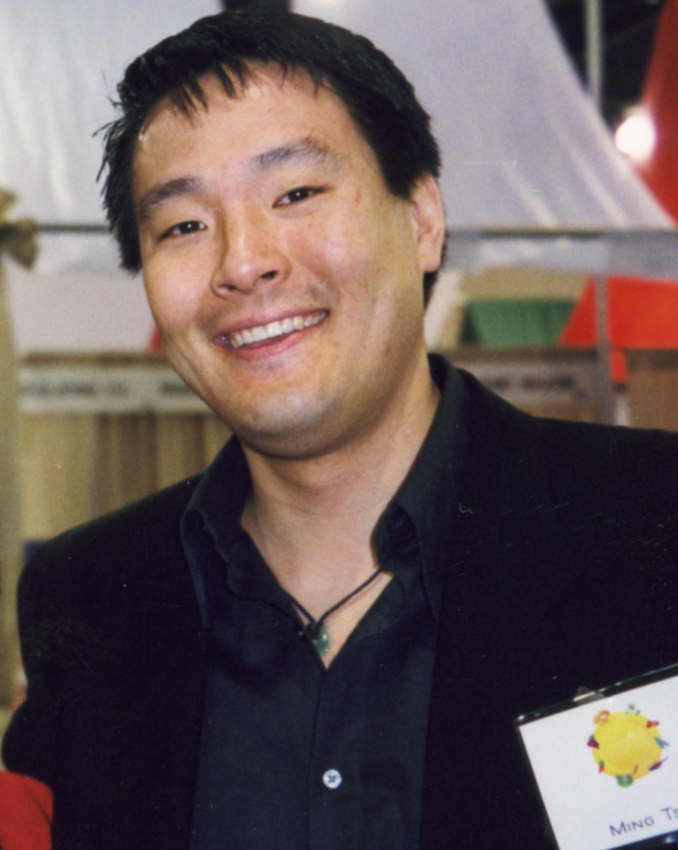
- Tsai in 1990
- Born: 1964 (age 61–62); Newport Beach, California, U.S.
- Education: Yale University; Cornell University; Le Cordon Bleu
- Spouse: Polly Talbott-Tsai
- Children: 2
- Culinary career
- Cooking style: Fusion
- Previous restaurants
- Blue Ginger, Wellesley, Massachusetts (1998 – June 2017); Blue Dragon, Boston, Massachusetts (2013 - May 2020)
- Television shows
- East Meets West (1998–2003); Ming's Quest; Simply Ming

Ming Hao Tsai (Chinese: 蔡明昊; pinyin: Cài Mínghào; born 1964) is an American chef, restaurateur, television personality, and former squash player. His restaurants have focused on east–west fusion cuisine, and have included major stakes in Blue Ginger in Wellesley, Massachusetts (a Zagat- and James Beard-recognized establishment) from 1998 to 2017, and Blue Dragon in the Fort Point Channel area of Boston (a Zagat-recognized tapas-style gastropub named in Esquire Magazine "Best New Restaurants 2013").

Tsai hosts Simply Ming, a cooking show featured on American Public Television, in its seventeenth season. Past shows Tsai hosted include Ming's Quest, a cooking show featured on the Fine Living Network, and East Meets West. Tsai appeared in the Food Network cooking competition The Next Iron Chef (2010).

== Early life and education ==
Tsai was born to Iris (née Lee), who owned a Chinese restaurant, and Stephen Tsai, an engineer who co-developed the Tsai-Wu failure criterion, and was raised in Dayton, Ohio, where he attended The Miami Valley School. He assisted with the cooking as he was growing up in the restaurant, Mandarin Kitchen. Tsai's maternal grandparents emigrated to Dayton from Taiwan after escaping China during the Cultural Revolution.

Tsai later attended Phillips Academy in Andover, Massachusetts, and then proceeded to study engineering and play varsity squash at Yale University. There, he was a member of the Phi chapter of the Delta Kappa Epsilon fraternity, and graduated with a degree in mechanical engineering in 1986. He received a master's degree in hotel administration and hospitality marketing from Cornell University in 1989. Either the summer after his sophomore or junior year at Yale, he attended culinary school at Le Cordon Bleu in Paris. Tsai speaks four languages: English, Mandarin, French, and Spanish.

Tsai is a grandson of Chinese composer Lee Pao-Chen. He is a 116th great grandson of Huang Di.

== Career ==
=== Television ===
Tsai began his television career on chef Sara Moulton's cooking show Cooking Live while she had him fill in for one week for her in 1997. He hosted East Meets West on the Food Network from 1998 to 2003. He hosts Simply Ming, a food show on PBS.

In 2005, he was a judge on the PBS show Cooking Under Fire. Tsai challenged Iron Chef Bobby Flay in the third episode of season one of Iron Chef America in 2005; Tsai defeated Flay. Tsai was a contestant in The Next Iron Chef in 2010, where he was eliminated in the seventh week. Tsai appeared on an episode of Top Chef in 2014. Tsai later became one of the five Iron Chefs in Netflix’s Iron Chef: Quest for an Iron Legend in 2022.

His other television appearances include participation in a Zoom Out on Zoom, a show distributed by PBS, in 2005 and on an episode of the PBS children's television show Arthur in 2006.

=== Restaurants ===
In 1998, Tsai and Polly Talbott opened his first restaurant, Blue Ginger, in Wellesley, Massachusetts. Blue Ginger, an Asian Fusion restaurant, has become a Zagat and James Beard-recognized establishment, winning many other regional awards as well. The year that the restaurant opened, Tsai was named "Chef of the Year" by Esquire Magazine. On March 30, 2010, Tsai opened Blue Ginger Noodle Bar, a mini-restaurant, inside Blue Ginger. In June 2017, Tsai closed Blue Ginger after 19 years of business. The reason was due to the end of a lease and Tsai's focus on a new fast-casual stir-fry concept restaurant, ChowStirs, scheduled to open in Boston during the early part of 2018.

Tsai opened Blue Dragon in 2013 in the Fort Point Channel area of Boston, an east–west tapas-style gastropub that has become a Zagat's recognized restaurant, which was named an Esquire Magazine "Best New Restaurant" in its opening year. Blue Dragon closed in March 2020 at the beginning of the pandemic.

In 2020, Tsai opened BāBā at the Yellowstone Club in Big Sky, Montana as chef and partner.

=== Cookbook author ===
Tsai is the author of five cookbooks: Blue Ginger, Simply Ming, Ming's Master Recipes, Simply Ming: One-Pot Meals, and Simply Ming in Your Kitchen.

=== Awards and recognition ===
Tsai won the Daytime Emmy award in 1999, in the category Outstanding Service Show Host. Tsai's Blue Ginger Restaurant was inducted into the Culinary Hall of Fame in 2012. In 2000, Ming was on the 50 Most Beautiful People list published by People magazine.

=== Controversies ===
In 2023, Tsai issued an apology after making a joke about a roofie, a slang reference to date rape drugs, during an interview with Irene Li for WBUR radio station's Curated Cuisine series.

== Personal life ==
Tsai and Polly Talbott have been married since April 1996. They have two sons, David and Henry. David Talbott, Tsai's squash coach at Yale, and Mark Talbott, a former World No. 1 hardball squash player, are Tsai's brothers-in-law. Lauren Tsai, the American actress, is his niece. According to Henry Louis Gates' PBS program Finding Your Roots, Tsai is a 116th-generation descendant of the Yellow Emperor (27th century BCE).

=== Sports ===
Tsai was a squash player at Yale, playing number two for the team, and he was named as an All-Ivy League player in 1986. While attending culinary school in France, Tsai played professionally on the European circuit. In 2004, Tsai played a celebrity squash match against professional golfer Brad Faxon at a Boston squash club. In 2005, he played against Mark Talbott in a charity match at a squash club in San Francisco.

=== Philanthropy ===
One of Tsai's sons has food allergies, and Tsai has become a food allergy advocate who promotes awareness of food allergens. Since 2005, he has been a national spokesman for the Food Allergy & Anaphylaxis Network (FAAN) and in December 2012 was awarded a lifetime achievement award for his advocacy work from the organization, including his work on the state of Massachusetts food safety bill. Tsai was heavily featured on Season 1, Episode 5 of Netflix's "Rotten" discussing his thoughts and observations on the restaurant industry; specifically about food-allergic individuals being able to dine out safely. Tsai is currently the President of the National Advisory Board for Family Reach, an organization that provides a financial lifeline to families fighting cancer.
