= Rosenstiel Award =

Award in medical research from Brandeis University

The Lewis S. Rosenstiel Award for Distinguished Work in Basic Medical Research is awarded by Brandeis University. It was established in 1971 "as an expression of the conviction that educational institutions have an important role to play in the encouragement and development of basic science as it applies to medicine".

Medals are presented annually at Brandeis University on the basis of recommendations of a panel of scientists selected by the Rosenstiel Basic Medical Sciences Research Center. Awards are given to scientists for recent discoveries of "particular originality" and "importance to basic medical research". A $30,000 prize and a medallion accompanies each award.

The Rosenstiel Basic Medical Sciences Research Center, named after Lewis Solon Rosenstiel, was established in 1968, carrying out research in basic medical science.

== Recipients ==
Source: Brandeis University

- 2025 Steven Henikoff, for his transformative research on genome organization and gene expression.
- 2024 Winrich Freiwald, Nancy Kanwisher, Margaret Livingstone, Doris Tsao for discovering how and where in the brain face recognition occurs.
- 2023 Wolfgang Baumeister, for his pioneering work in the development of cryo-electron tomography and his insights into the structures and functions of the protein quality control machinery
- 2022 Christine Holt and Erin Schuman, for their pioneering work that shed light on the role of local protein synthesis in neuronal development and function.
- 2021 Robert H. Singer, for his key role in revealing the dynamics of gene expression using high-resolution imaging.
- 2020 Katalin Karikó and Drew Weissman, for their pioneering work in the modification of nucleic acids to develop RNA therapeutics and vaccines.
- 2019 David Julius and Ardem Patapoutian, for their remarkable contributions to our understanding of the sensations of temperature, pain and touch.
- 2018 Stephen C. Harrison, for his fundamental and far-reaching studies of protein structure using X-ray crystallography
- 2017 Titia de Lange, for her elucidation of the protection of telomeres and the maintenance of genome stability
- 2016 Susan Lindquist (posthum), in recognition of her pioneering work on the mechanisms of protein folding and the severe consequences of protein misfolding that are manifest in disease
- 2015 Yoshinori Ohsumi, in recognition of his pioneering discoveries of molecular pathways and biological functions of protein degradation by autophagy
- 2014 Frederick Alt, in recognition of his pioneering work in elucidating the mechanisms of genome rearrangements in immune and cancer cells
- 2013 Winfried Denk, David Tank and Watt W. Webb, in recognition of their invention of multiphoton fluorescence microscopy and its application to illuminating the function of brain microcircuits
- 2012 Stephen J. Elledge, for elucidating how eukaryotic cells sense and respond to DNA damage
- 2011 Nahum Sonenberg, for his transformative studies of the control of protein synthesis in mammalian cells
- 2010 C. David Allis and Michael Grunstein, for their discovery that histones and histone acetylation directly regulate transcription
- 2009 Jules Hoffman and Ruslan Medzhitov, for elucidating the mechanisms of innate immunity
- 2008 John Gurdon, Irving Weissman and Shinya Yamanaka, for their pioneering work in the field of stem cell research
- 2007 F.-Ulrich Hartl and Arthur L. Horwich, for their pioneering work in the field of protein-mediated protein folding
- 2006 Mary F. Lyon, Davor Solter and Azim Surani, for their pioneering work on epigenetic gene regulation in mammalian embryos
- 2005 Martin Chalfie and Roger Y. Tsien, for their pioneering development of powerful new tools that allow the direct visualization of molecules in living cells
- 2004 Andrew Z. Fire, Craig C. Mello, Victor Ambros and Gary Ruvkun, for their pioneering achievements in the discovery of gene silencing by double-stranded RNA
- 2003 Masakazu Konishi, Peter Marler and Fernando Nottebohm, for their pioneering achievements in the ethology and neurology of birdsong
- 2002 Ira Herskowitz, for his pioneering achievements in yeast genetics and cell biology
- 2001 Joan A. Steitz, for her work in establishing a sub-field of molecular biology concerning small nuclear ribonucleoproteins
- 2000 Peter B. Moore, Harry F. Noller, Jr. and Thomas A. Steitz, for their discovery that peptide bond formation on the ribosome is catalyzed exclusively by ribosomal RNA
- 1999 Roderick MacKinnon, for his research into the molecular foundations of electrical signal generation in neurons and other types of cells
- 1998 Elizabeth Blackburn and Carol Greider, for their outstanding work on the maintenance of telomeres
- 1997 H. Robert Horvitz and John E. Sulston, for their pioneering studies of cell lineage in the nematode worm
- 1996 Richard Axel, Linda B. Buck and A. James Hudspeth, for establishing the molecular basis of the senses of smell and hearing
- 1995 Thomas D. Pollard and James A. Spudich, for their fundamental contributions to our understanding of molecular motors
- 1994 Robert G. Roeder and Robert Tjian, for their outstanding work on eukaryotic transcription regulation
- 1993 James E. Rothman and Randy Schekman, for determining the components of the secretory pathway
- 1992 Paul Nurse and Leland H. Hartwell, for establishing the details of the control of eukaryotic cell cycle
- 1991 David Botstein, Raymond L. White and Ronald W. Davis, for creating the methods by which variations in the human genome can be detected and analyzed
- 1990 Richard Henderson and Peter Nigel Tripp Unwin, for determining the first structure of an integral membrane protein
- 1989 Christiane Nüsslein-Volhard and Edward B. Lewis, for pioneering studies of eukaryotic development
- 1988 Sidney Altman and Thomas R. Cech, for discovering RNA catalysis
- 1987 Shinya Inoué, for his innovations in light microscopy
- 1986 Harland G. Wood, for his outstanding work on enzyme function
- 1985 Seymour Benzer and Sydney Brenner, for founding modern eukaryotic genetics
- 1984 Donald D. Brown and Robert L. Letsinger, for their seminal work on development
- 1983 Eric R. Kandel and Daniel E. Koshland, Jr., for pioneering contributions to sensory transduction
- 1982 Keith R. Porter and Alexander Rich
- 1981 Stanley Cohen, Rita Levi-Montalcini and Gordon H. Sato
- 1980 Elias J. Corey, Bengt I. Samuelsson and Frank H. Westheimer
- 1979 Howard Green and Beatrice Mintz
- 1978 César Milstein
- 1977 Barbara McClintock
- 1976 Peter D. Mitchell
- 1975 Bruce Ames, James A. Miller and Elizabeth C. Miller
- 1974 Arthur B. Pardee and H. Edwin Umbarger
- 1973 H. Ronald Kaback and Saul Roseman
- 1972 Boris Ephrussi
- 1971 David H. Hubel and Torsten N. Wiesel

== See also ==
- Rosenstiel School of Marine, Atmospheric, and Earth Science
- History of the Jews in Cincinnati
- Frederick A. Johnson
- Roy Cohn
- List of medicine awards
