= Victor Hao Li =

American professor and administrator

Victor Hao Li (Chinese: 李浩; September 17, 1941 – September 18, 2013) was an American law professor and academic administrator who served as President of the East–West Center from 1981 to 1989.

== Biography ==
Li was born in Hong Kong on September 17, 1941. His father, General Li Hanhun, was governor of Guangdong Province from 1938 to 1945 and was a Cabinet minister in the Nationalist government of Chiang Kai-shek.

Li came to the United States in 1947 and graduated from White Plains High School in White Plains, New York in 1957. His family operated a restaurant, China Gardens, in the town. In 1957, he became a naturalized American citizen.

In 1961, Li received his bachelor's degree in mathematics from Columbia College. He then received a J.D. from Columbia Law School, a LL.M. in 1965, and a S.J.D. in 1972, both from Harvard Law School.

From 1964 to 1969, Li was visiting professor at the University of Michigan Law School, and assistant professor at Columbia Law School from 1969 to 1972 before he was made associate professor from 1972 to 1974.

From 1974 to 1981, Li was the Lewis Talbot and Nadine Hearn Shelton Professor of International Legal Studies at Stanford Law School and was known as the Boy Professor because he was younger than some of the students he taught. He was also the first ethnic Chinese law professor in America. Internationally he became known for his research and writing on China's legal system and has been a consultant to the U.S. Senate Foreign Relations Committee.

From 1981 to 1990, Li was President of the East-West Center in Honolulu, dedicated to promoting understanding between the United States and Asia-Pacific nations through cooperative study, training, and research. In 1983, he was invited as the commencement speaker of California State University, Dominguez Hills.

In 1984, Chinese Premier Zhao Ziyang made Hawaii his first stop on his official visit to the United States after Li flew to China and extended him a personal invitation. When asked why Hawaii should be the first stop on his state visit, Li replied that "China always has made it a very important point to deal not only with the American government, but also the American people. Come to Hawaii. We are the American people." He also secured visits to the center by Prime Minister Kakuei Tanaka, Akihito, then the Crown Prince of Japan, and Prime Minister Prem Tinsulanonda of Thailand. As president of the research center, Li was instrumental in shaping the United States's relations with China.

After stepping down from the center, he co-founded Asia Pacific Consulting Group of the law firm Watanabe Ing & Kawashima with former Hawaii governor George Ariyoshi, helping American companies set up operations in China while Ariyoshi did so in Japan.

Li also served as a director of Hawaiian Electric Industries, Grumman Corporation, American Savings Bank, and AEL China Generating Company.

Li was married to Arlene Lum, former publisher of the Honolulu Star-Bulletin and had three children with Lum. He died on September 18, 2013, in Oakland, California at the age of 72. Li also has a brother, Harvard professor Frederick Pei Li, famous for the discovery of the Li–Fraumeni syndrome.
