= Bruce Ames =

American biochemist (1928–2024)

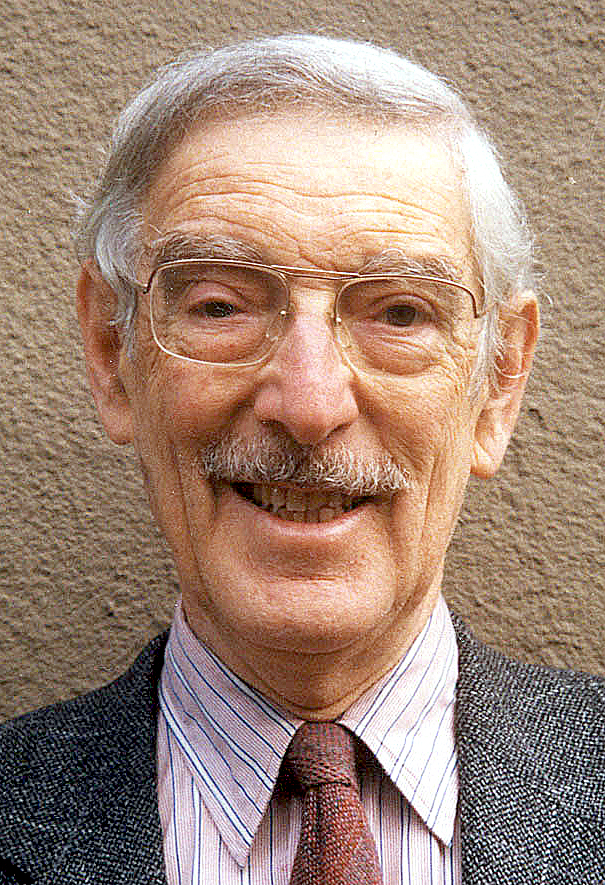
- Ames in 2009
- Born: Bruce Nathan Ames; December 16, 1928; New York City, U.S
- Died: October 5, 2024 (aged 95); Berkeley, California, U.S.
- Education: California Institute of Technology, Cornell University
- Known for: Ames test
- Spouse: Giovanna Ferro-Luzzi Ames
- Awards: Charles S. Mott Prize (1983); Tyler Prize for Environmental Achievement (1985); AIC Gold Medal (1981); Japan Prize (1997); National Medal of Science (1998); Thomas Hunt Morgan Medal (2004)
- Scientific career
- Fields: Molecular Biology, Biochemistry
- Workplaces: University of California, Berkeley; Children's Hospital Oakland Research Institute; National Institutes of Health
- Thesis: The biosynthesis of histidine in Neurospora crassa (1953)
- Doctoral advisor: Herschel K. Mitchell and Mary B. Mitchell

Bruce Nathan Ames (December 16, 1928 – October 5, 2024) was an American biochemist who was a professor of biochemistry and Molecular Biology Emeritus at the University of California, Berkeley, and was a senior scientist at Children's Hospital Oakland Research Institute (CHORI). Ames made contributions to understanding the mechanisms of mutagenesis and DNA repair. He invented the Ames test, a widely used assay for easily and cheaply evaluating the mutagenicity of compounds. The test revolutionized the field of toxicology and has played a crucial role in identifying numerous environmental and industrial carcinogens.

== Biography ==
Ames, raised in New York City, was a graduate of the Bronx High School of Science. His undergraduate studies were at Cornell University in Ithaca, New York, and his graduate studies were completed at the California Institute of Technology.

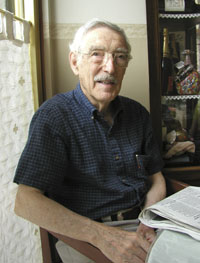
Ames in 2003

Ames was elected a Fellow of the American Academy of Arts and Sciences in 1970. He is a recipient of the Bolton S. Corson Medal in 1980, Tyler Prize for Environmental Achievement in 1985, the Japan Prize in 1997, the National Medal of Science in 1998 and the Thomas Hunt Morgan Medal in 2004, among many others.

Ames' research focused on cancer and aging and he authored over 550 scientific publications. He is among the few hundred most-cited scientists in all fields.

Ames' later research included identifying agents that delay the mitochondrial decay of aging, understanding the role of mitochondrial decay in aging, particularly in the brain, optimizing micronutrient intakes in the population to prevent disease, malnutrition, and obesity. He was also interested in mutagens as they relate to cancer prevention and aging.

Ames received more than $650,000 in support from the National Foundation for Cancer Research between 1998 and 2007.

He was married to Giovanna Ferro-Luzzi Ames, who was also a professor of biochemistry at the University of California, Berkeley.

Ames died on October 5, 2024 at a hospital in Berkeley, California at the age of 95.

== Ames on synthetic carcinogens ==
In the 1970s, Ames developed the Ames test which is a cheap and convenient assay for mutagens and therefore potential carcinogens. Previous carcinogenic testing used live animals, and the procedures are expensive and time-consuming. This made animal testing impractical for use in screening on a wide scale, and reduced the number of compounds that could be tested. The Ames test on the other hand uses the bacteria Salmonella typhimurium to test for mutagens, and is considerably cheaper and faster. The Ames test became widely used as an initial screen for possible carcinogens and has been used to identify potential carcinogens previously used in commercial products. Their identification led to some of those formulations, such as chemicals used in hair dye, being withdrawn from commercial use. The ease with which Ames test allows widely used chemicals to be identified as possible carcinogens made him an early hero of environmentalism.

Subsequent work in Ames' lab involved looking at an overview of what was mutagenic or carcinogenic, and to what degree. Previously, scientists tended to only look for positive or negative results without considering the magnitude of the effect, which meant that as more and more items were shown to be potentially mutagenic, there was no system for evaluating the relative dangers. He also continued to test various natural and man-made compounds, and discovered that, despite what he and others had assumed, naturally occurring compounds were not turning out to be benign as compared to man-made ones. His continued work eventually led to his falling out of favor with many environmentalists. As natural chemicals turned out to also be frequently mutagenic, he argued that environmental exposure to manufactured chemicals may be of limited relevance to human cancer, even when such chemicals are mutagenic in an Ames test and carcinogenic in rodent assays. He contended that most human genetic damage arises from essential micronutrients lacking in poor diets and the oxidation of DNA during normal metabolism, and that the most important environmental carcinogens may include some whose chief effect is to cause the chronic division of stem cells whereby the normal protective mechanisms of a cell become less effective.

He argued against the banning of synthetic pesticides and other chemicals such as Alar which have been shown to be carcinogenic. Ames published results showing that many ordinary food products would be found carcinogenic according to the same criteria. Ames was concerned that overzealous attention to the relatively minor health effects of trace quantities of carcinogens may divert scarce financial resources away from major health risks, and cause public confusion about the relative importance of different hazards. Ames considered himself a leading "contrarian in the hysteria over tiny traces of chemicals that may or may not cause cancer", and said that "if you have thousands of hypothetical risks that you are supposed to pay attention to, that completely drives out the major risks you should be aware of."

== Awards and honors ==
- Eli Lilly Award of the American Chemical Society 1964
- Elected to American Academy of Arts and Sciences 1970
- Elected to National Academy of Sciences 1972
- Rosenstiel Award 1975
- Fellow of the American Association for the Advancement of Science 1980
- Wadsworth Award 1981
- Charles S. Mott Prize, GM Cancer Research Foundation 1983
- Gairdner Foundation Award 1983
- IBM-Princess Takamatsu Cancer Res Fund Lectureship 1984
- Tyler Prize for Environmental Achievement 1985
- Elected Foreign Member, The Royal Swedish Academy of Sciences 1989
- Gold Medal Award of the American Institute of Chemists 1991
- Elected Fellow, Academy of Toxicological Sciences 1992
- Elected Fellow, American Academy of Microbiology 1992
- Glenn Foundation Award of the Gerontological Society of America 1992
- Röntgen Prize of the Accademia Nazionale de Lincei (Italy) 1993
- Messel Medal, British Society of Chemical Industry 1996
- Society of Toxicology Public Communications Award 1996
- Honda Prize 1996
- Japan Prize 1997
- Kehoe Award, American College of Occup. and Environ. Med 1997
- Medal of the City of Paris 1998
- U.S. National Medal of Science 1998
- American Society for Microbiology Lifetime Achievement Award 2001
- Linus Pauling Institute Prize for Health Research 2001
- Thomas Hunt Morgan Medal, Genetics Society Am 2004
- American Society for Nutrition/CRN M.S. Rose Award 2008
- Orthomolecular Medicine Hall of Fame 2010
- Society Of Toxicology Lifetime Achievement Award 2012
- American Society of Nutrition Class of 2018 Fellows 2018
