= Rebecca Aft =

American surgical oncologist and breast cancer researcher

- Born: St. Louis, Missouri
- Education: University of Wisconsin Madison; Washington University School of Medicine
- Known for: Disseminated cancer cells, bisphosphonates, breast cancer
- Awards: Jeffrey F. Moley Professor of Endocrine and Oncologic Surgery
- Scientific career
- Fields: Breast oncology, general surgery
- Workplaces: Washington University in St. Louis

Rebecca Aft is an American surgical oncologist and breast cancer researcher. Holds the inaugural title of Moley Professor of Endocrine and Oncologic Surgery at Washington University School of Medicine in St. Louis. Aft studies the mechanisms of breast cancer metastasis and explores potential targets for treatment. Her work has identified the anti-metastatic effects of bisphosphonates in patients with breast cancer.

== Early life and education ==
Aft was born in St. Louis, Missouri. She left St. Louis to pursue a PhD in biochemistry at the University of Wisconsin–Madison. During her graduate education, she conducted oncology research at the McArdle Laboratory for Cancer Research. Following the completion of her PhD in 1983, Aft completed post-doctoral studies at the Weizmann Institute of Science in Israel. She returned to her hometown of St. Louis in 1987 for a professorship position at Saint Louis University. Shortly after returning to St. Louis, Aft began medical school at Washington University in St. Louis as she wanted experience caring for and treating patients with cancer. She graduated medical school in 1992 and pursued a general surgery residency at Washington University in St. Louis. From 1995 to 1996, Aft held a position of senior registrar at the University of Sydney in Australia, after which she returned to Washington University School of Medicine to complete her chief year as a surgical resident.

== Career and research ==
In 1997, Aft accepted a faculty position as a breast surgeon and cancer researcher at Washington University School of Medicine in St. Louis. Aft is a full Professor of Surgery in the Division of General Surgery and Section of Surgical Oncology at Washington University School of Medicine in St. Louis. Aft also operates at the John Cochran Veterans Administration Hospital in St. Louis. She also holds a position on a committee of faculty involved in medical student admissions at Washington University School of Medicine.

Bisphosphonates and breast cancer metastasis

In addition to her roles as a surgeon who operates on patients with breast cancer, Aft leads a laboratory at Washington University School of Medicine with a focus on identifying mechanisms of breast cancer metastasis. Her group has focused on the potential of targeting bone turnover in breast cancer patients to prevent metastasis. In a randomized controlled trial published in the Lancet in 2010 that women who take bisphosphonates during chemotherapy treatment have less disseminated tumor cells (DCTs) in their bone marrow. In women with triple negative breast cancer, patients who took bisphosphopnates after treatment were less likely to have metastasis (cite, cite).

Robotic-assisted nipple-sparing mastectomies

Aft is also part of a multi-institutional research effort to explore the possibility of minimally invasive and nipple sparing breast surgery on patients with breast cancer. Along with 8 other institutions, Aft leads the Washington University School of Medicine effort to conduct a randomized controlled trial of mastectomies with and without a robot.

== Honors and awards ==
- 2023 - Jeffrey F. Moley Professor of Endocrine and Oncologic Surgery
- 2011 - Jewish Light Unsung Hero Award
- 2002 - Association of Women Surgeons Fellowship Grant

== Select publications ==
- Watson, Mark A.; Ylagan, Lourdes R.; Trinkaus, Kathryn M.; Gillanders, William E.; Naughton, Michael J.; Weilbaecher, Katherine N.; Fleming, Timothy P.; Aft, Rebecca L. (2007-09-01). "Isolation and molecular profiling of bone marrow micrometastases identifies TWIST1 as a marker of early tumor relapse in breast cancer patients". Clinical Cancer Research. 13 (17): 5001–5009. doi:10.1158/1078-0432.CCR-07-0024. ISSN 1078-0432. PMC 2680916. PMID 17785550.
- Aft, R; Naughton, M; Trinkaus, K; Watson, M; Ylagan, L; Chavez-MacGregor, M; Zhai, J; Kuo, S; Shannon, W; Diemer, K; Herrmann, V; Dietz, J; Ali, A; Ellis, M; Weiss, P; Eberlein, T; Ma, C; Fracasso, PM; Zoberi, I; Taylor, M; Gillanders, W; Pluard, T; Mortimer, J; Weilbaecher, K (2010). "Effect of zoledronic acid on disseminated tumour cells in women with locally advanced breast cancer: an open label, randomised, phase 2 trial". Lancet Oncol. 11: 421–8. doi:10.1016/S1470-2045(10)70054-1. PMC 3792651. PMID 20362507.
- Aft, R. L.; Naughton, M.; Trinkaus, K.; Weilbaecher, K. (June 2012). "Effect of (Neo)adjuvant zoledronic acid on disease-free and overall survival in clinical stage II/III breast cancer". British Journal of Cancer. 107 (1): 7–11. doi:10.1038/bjc.2012.210. ISSN 1532-1827. PMC 3389411. PMID 22617128.
- Jallouk, Andrew P.; Paravastu, Sriram; Weilbaecher, Katherine; Aft, Rebecca L. (May 2021). "Long-term outcome of (neo)adjuvant zoledronic acid therapy in locally advanced breast cancer". Breast Cancer Research and Treatment. 187 (1): 135–144. doi:10.1007/s10549-021-06100-2. ISSN 1573-7217. PMC 8068643. PMID 33591469.
