= Saul Roseman =

American biochemist

- Born: March 9, 1921; Brooklyn, New York
- Died: July 2, 2011 (aged 90); Pikesville, Maryland
- Education: City College of New York; University of Wisconsin (Ph.D, 1948)
- Known for: Glycobiology; Published the first correct structure of Sialic acid
- Spouse: Martha Roseman
- Children: 3
- Scientific career
- Fields: Biochemistry; Organic Chemistry
- Workplaces: University of Michigan; Johns Hopkins University
- Doctoral advisor: Karl Paul Link
- Other academic advisors: Albert Dorfman
- Notable students: Donald Comb

Saul Roseman (March 9, 1921 - July 2, 2011) was an American biochemist at Johns Hopkins University in Baltimore, Maryland. Among many discoveries related to carbohydrate biochemistry, he discovered the phosphotransferase system in bacteria.

== Awards ==
- 1971 Member of the American Academy of Arts and Sciences
- 1972 Member of the National Academy of Sciences
- 1974 Rosenstiel Award (together with H. Ronald Kaback)
- 1981 Gairdner Foundation International Award
- 1984 Honorary Doctorate of the University of Lund
- 1993 Karl Meyer Award of the Society for Glycobiology
