= Raymond L. White =

American geneticist

- Born: October 23, 1943; Orlando, Florida
- Died: October 4, 2018 (aged 74)
- Education: University of Oregon, Massachusetts Institute of Technology
- Known for: Insights into the structures and functions of the protein quality control machinery
- Awards: William Allan Award, Charles S. Mott Prize, Rosenstiel Award, Utah Governor's Medal for Science and Technology
- Scientific career
- Fields: Genetics
- Workplaces: University of Utah School of Medicine, University of California, San Francisco

Raymond Leslie White (October 23, 1943 – October 4, 2018) was an American geneticist.

== Biography ==
Born in Orlando, Florida in 1943, White earned a bachelor's degree in microbiology from the University of Oregon and obtained a doctorate, also in microbiology, from the Massachusetts Institute of Technology in 1971. He taught at the University of Utah School of Medicine and later moved to the University of California, San Francisco as Rudi Schmid Distinguished Professor in Neurology and was a Howard Hughes Medical Investigator from 1980 to 1994.

== Honors and awards ==
In 1989, White received the William Allan Award, followed by the Charles S. Mott Prize in 1990, which he shared with Webster Cavenee. White was one of three recipients of the Rosenstiel Award in 1991, alongside David Botstein and Ronald W. Davis. In 1993, White was one of five in the field of academia to be honored with a Utah Governor's Medal for Science and Technology. White was granted membership to the National Academy of Sciences and the American Academy of Arts and Sciences in 1992 and 2005, respectively.
