= Tim Stearns =

American researcher (born 1961)

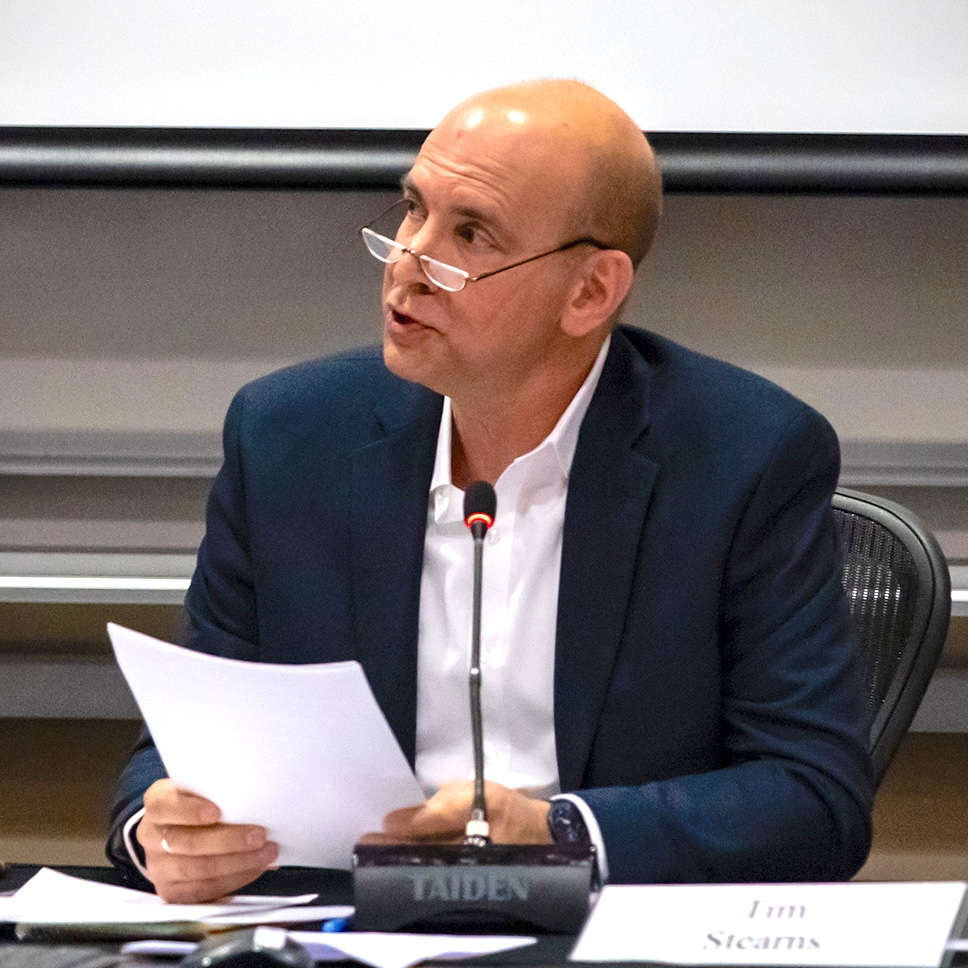
- Stearns in 2020
- Born: August 8, 1961 (age 65); Manhasset, New York
- Education: Cornell University (BS); Massachusetts Institute of Technology (PhD); University of California, San Francisco (Postdoc)
- Awards: HHMI Professor, Searle Scholar
- Scientific career
- Fields: Genetics; Cell Biology; Developmental Biology
- Workplaces: Rockefeller University; Stanford University
- Thesis: Genetic analysis of the yeast microtubule cytoskeleton (1988)
- Doctoral advisor: David Botstein
- Other academic advisors: Marc Kirschner
- Website: Rockefeller University; Google Scholar; ORCID

Tim Stearns (born 1961 in Manhasset, New York) is an American scientist and educator. He is a Professor and Dean of the graduate school at The Rockefeller University, where he is Head of the Laboratory of Cellular Dynamics. Stearns was formerly the Frank Lee and Carol Hall Professor in the Department of Biology at Stanford University, with appointments in the Department of Genetics and the Cancer Center in the Stanford Medical School. Stearns served as chair of the Department of Biology at Stanford, 2014-2020, as well as Acting Dean of Research and Senior Associate Vice Provost of Research. He also chaired the 52nd Faculty Senate, 2019-2020. Stearns was an HHMI Professor 2002-2024, and is a member of JASON, a scientific advisory group. He has served on the editorial boards of The Journal of Cell Biology, Genetics and Molecular Biology of the Cell.

== Education ==
Stearns received his B.S. in genetics from Cornell University and did his undergraduate thesis work in the lab of Tom Fox on nuclear control of mitochondrial function in yeast. He received his Ph.D. in biology from the Massachusetts Institute of Technology. His Ph.D. advisor at MIT was David Botstein, and the title of his thesis was "Genetic analysis of the yeast microtubule cytoskeleton." Stearns' thesis work identified exceptions to the genetic complementation test that were useful for defining genetic interactions and for the first time used the term synthetic lethality in the modern sense of two non-lethal mutations resulting in lethality in the double mutant. Stearns credits Botstein with instilling in him a commitment to teaching, and the belief that teaching and research go hand-in-hand.

== Professional career ==
Stearns is known for his work on problems in cell biology and developmental biology, with a focus on the structure and function of the centrosome and cilium of eukaryotic cells. He was a Helen Hay Whitney postdoctoral fellow with Marc Kirschner at UCSF, where he published work on gamma-tubulin and in vitro reconstitution of the centrosome. Stearns was a faculty member in the Department of Biology at Stanford University 1993-2022, before moving to Rockefeller University. His major research accomplishments include the identification and characterization of new members of the tubulin superfamily of proteins, elucidation of mechanisms of centrosome duplication, and identification of properties of the primary cilium. Stearns served on the NIH NCSD review panel, chairing the panel 2019-21.

Stearns has also been active in undergraduate and graduate education, being named an HHMI Professor in 2002, and has chaired the Education committees of the American Society for Cell Biology and the Genetics Society of America. He created a pre-grad program at Stanford to train the next generation of leaders in biology research through close interaction with faculty members in course work, research and advising. Stearns taught the Yeast Genetics course at Cold Spring Harbor Laboratory, and has also taught laboratory workshops in South Africa, Chile, Ghana, and Tanzania.

Stearns is an advisor to the US government on science and technology matters. He was a member of the Defense Science Study Group, and is a current member of JASON, an independent scientific advisory group to the US that provides expertise on problems related to national security. He served on the Science and Technology Committees of Lawrence Livermore National Laboratory and SLAC and been a member of working groups for PCAST and the Defense Science Board.
