= Ronald W. Davis =

American biochemist

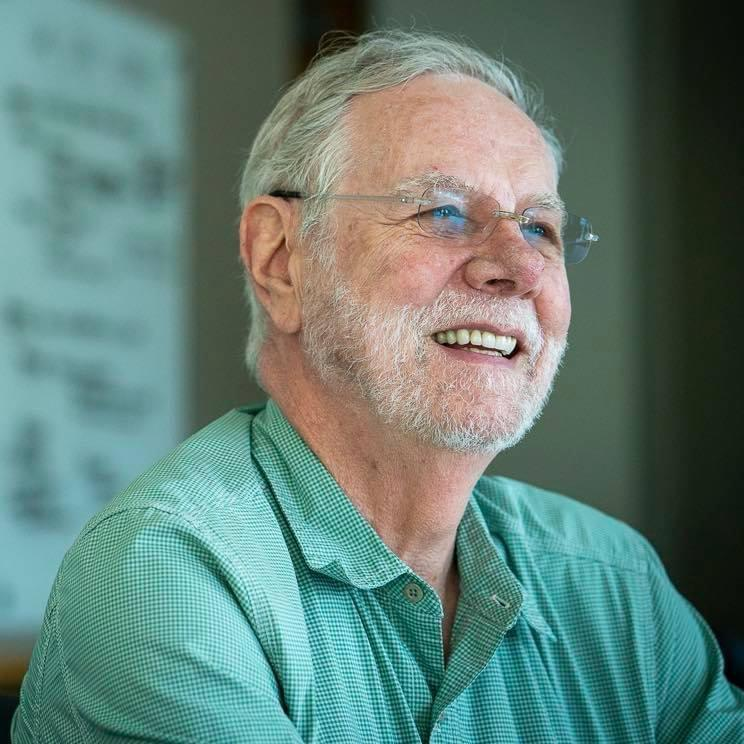
- Ron Davis in 2021
- Born: July 17, 1941 (age 85); Charleston, Illinois
- Education: California Institute of Technology, Eastern Illinois University
- Known for: Human Genome Project patents in biotechnology ME/CFS research
- Spouse: Janet Dafoe (m. 1969)
- Children: 2
- Awards: Precision Medicine World Conference Luminary Award (2015); Warren Alpert Foundation Prize (2013); Gruber Prize in Genetics (2011); Distinguished Alumni Award, California Institute of Technology (2007); Dickson Prize in Medicine (2005); Lifetime Achievement Award, Genetics Society of America (2004); Rosenstiel Award (1991) NAS Award in Molecular Biology (1981); Eli Lilly Award in Microbiology and Immunology (1976)
- Scientific career
- Fields: Biochemistry; Molecular Genetics; Genomics; Myalgic encephalomyelitis/chronic fatigue syndrome
- Institutions: Stanford University, Harvard University, Cold Spring Harbor Laboratory
- Thesis: A Study of the Base Sequence Arrangement in DNA by Electron Microscopy (1970)

Ronald Wayne "Ron" Davis (born July 17, 1941) is professor of biochemistry and genetics, and director of the Stanford Genome Technology Center at Stanford University. Davis is a researcher in biotechnology and molecular genetics, particularly active in human and yeast genomics and the development of new technologies in genomics, with over 64 biotechnology patents. In 2013, it was said of Davis that "A substantial number of the major genetic advances of the past 20 years can be traced back to Davis in some way." Since his son fell severely ill with myalgic encephalomyelitis/chronic fatigue syndrome Davis has focused his research efforts into the illness.

== Scientific career ==
After completing his PhD at Caltech and a postdoctoral fellowship at Harvard University working with Jim Watson, Davis joined the faculty of Stanford's department of biochemistry in 1972. He became an associate professor in 1980, full professor in 1980, and joined the department of genetics as a professor in 1990. He became director of the Stanford Genome Technology Center in 1994. He was elected a member of the National Academy of Sciences in 1983.

Davis developed the R-loop technique of electron microscopy for mapping coding RNAs which led to the discovery of RNA splicing. With Janet E. Mertz, Davis was the first to demonstrate the use of restriction endonucleases for joining DNA fragments. Davis collaborated in the development of the first DNA microarray for gene expression profiling with Patrick O. Brown, and the gene expression profile of the first complete eukaryotic genome (Saccharomyces cerevisiae). Davis, with David Botstein, Mark Skolnick, and Ray White developed the method for constructing a genetic linkage map using restriction fragment length polymorphisms that enabled and led to the Human Genome Project.

He and his colleagues submitted a proposal to NIH to map the human genome in 1979; that proposal was turned down as being too ambitious. The Stanford Genome Technology Center was included in the Human Genome Project that began in 1990 and was completed in 2003.

In 2013, Davis founded the Stanford Chronic Fatigue Syndrome Research Center (now called ME/CFS Collaborative Research Center).

== Recognition and awards ==
In 2013 Davis was named, alongside Elon Musk and Jeff Bezos, as one of today's nine greatest innovators by The Atlantic: "A substantial number of the major genetic advances of the past 20 years can be traced back to Davis in some way."

He has won recognition for his contributions to genetic research from many groups, as early as 1976 and as recently as 2015, from one of his alumni colleges and from the National Academy of Sciences. In 2015, he received the Precision Medicine World Conference Luminary Award for his development of “R-loop Technique of Electron Microscopy”. In 2013, he received the Warren Alpert Foundation Prize.

He received the Gruber Prize in Genetics in 2011, which noted among other achievements, two landmark papers, one in 1977 concerning genome editing and another in 1980 which "helped launch the field of genomics." In 2007, California Institute of Technology gave him its Distinguished Alumni Award. In 2005, Davis received the Dickson Prize in Medicine. In 2004, he received the Lifetime Achievement Award from the Genetics Society of America. The National Academy of Sciences (NAS) gave him the 1982 NAS Award in Molecular Biology. In 1976, he received the Eli Lilly Award in Microbiology and Immunology.

== Open Medicine Foundation ==
Dr. Davis is the director of the Scientific Advisory Board at the Open Medicine Foundation, a non-profit organization, whose goal is to fund and initiate research into chronic complex diseases. Presently the foundation is invested in The End ME/CFS Project, which aims to fast-track research for a cure for myalgic encephalomyelitis/chronic fatigue syndrome (ME/CFS).

In April 2019, a notable result was reported; a test of blood without red cells (white cells in plasma), identified ME/CFS patients from healthy people with 100% accuracy in a small sample, 20 patients and 20 healthy people. The test used a biotechnological device designed by Davis and his team, which is called the "nanoneedle".

“The small device that Davis and his colleagues created was originally developed to detect changes in electrical signals when cancer cells were exposed to different treatments.”, as described in Stat News. it was used to test cells of ME/CFS patients, and in their first hypothesis, found it to be useful in distinguishing patients from healthy people. People with this disease are described as not using energy well and taking a long time to recover from energy expenditure; “the researchers decided to mimic this by stressing cells from 20 healthy controls and 20 ME/CFS patients by exposing them to increased levels of salt.” Rahim Esfandyarpour, lead author of the paper, said “When they [cells from ME/CFS patients] face this new environment, their reaction is different than the reaction of healthy cells.”

Davis's research became more urgent and important after Dr. Anthony Fauci warned that some COVID-19 survivors showed symptoms in line with those of ME/CFS. According to Fauci, "a considerable number" of COVID-19 survivors struggle with extreme exhaustion, memory lapses, and cognitive difficulties many months after they have been officially cleared as recovered. Davis is part of a high-level interagency work and research group with the Centers for Disease Control and Prevention (CDC), National Institutes of Health, the Veterans Administration, and the Department of Defense looking at the long-term consequences of COVID-19 and Long COVID.

== Family ==
Davis married Janet Dafoe in July 1969. Their son, Whitney Dafoe was born in 1983, followed by their daughter Ashley Davis.

Whitney Dafoe became ill with severe ME/CFS around 2009, declining from active and healthy in his career as a photographer to housebound, and by 2015 bed bound from this disease, unable to tolerate sounds and light, unable to do much at all, and eventually unable to eat, drink or speak. Finally, even ordinary visual input (faces moving, light, colour, motion) started to provoke the same physiologic crash that heavy exercise provokes in milder patients. When that happens every stimulus—voice, touch, light—feels like being hit with a stun-gun. Whitney Dafoe has reached that extreme; only his parents have learned the rituals (dimmed light, fixed position, no sudden movement) that keep his nervous system from going into free-fall. As his endurance decreased, Dafoe moved back home in May 2011. His mother cut her work as a clinical psychologist to five hours a week to spend full time on his daily care as he continued declining in function, while Davis continues his research career and helps with his son's daily care. Dafoe's need for treatment is the motivation for Davis to direct his medical and scientific research efforts toward this disease; he dropped all other projects in hand before his son became so ill.

== See also ==
- The Puzzle Solver
