= Frederick Pei Li =

Chinese-American physician (1940–2015)

- Li in 1991
- Born: May 7, 1940; Canton, China
- Died: June 12, 2015 (aged 75); Brookline, Massachusetts, USA
- Education: New York University; University of Rochester; Georgetown University
- Known for: Li-Fraumeni syndrome
- Scientific career
- Workplaces: National Cancer Institute; Dana–Farber Cancer Institute

Frederick Pei Li (Chinese: 李沛; May 7, 1940 – June 12, 2015) was a Chinese-American physician. He is most famous for his discovery, together with his colleague Joseph Fraumeni, of Li–Fraumeni syndrome, which is caused by germline mutations of the p53 tumor suppressor gene and genetically predisposes families to high rates of cancer.

Li was born in China and raised in the United States, where he worked at the National Cancer Institute as a pioneer in cancer research and later as a professor at Harvard Medical School. He died in 2015 of Alzheimer's disease.

== Life ==
Li was born in Canton, China, and raised in New York City, where his parents, Li Hanhun and Wu Chu-Fang, operated a Chinese restaurant after World War II. His father, Li Hanhun, was a general in World War II (Second Sino-Japanese War) and the chair of Guangdong provincial government during later years of the war. Li also had a brother, Victor Hao Li, professor at Stanford Law School and past president of the East–West Center.

He received a B.A. in physics from New York University, an M.D. from the University of Rochester, and M.A. in demography from Georgetown University. In 1967 he joined the Epidemiology Branch of the National Cancer Institute (NCI). He served for 24 years, mostly at the NCI's field station at the Dana–Farber Cancer Institute in Boston. In 1991, he became head of Dana-Farber's Division of Cancer Epidemiology and Control, and retired in 2008.

Later in life, Li was Professor of Clinical Cancer Epidemiology at the Harvard T.H. Chan School of Public Health, Professor of Medicine at the Harvard Medical School, and the Harry and Elsa Jiler American Cancer Society Clinical Research Professor. In 1996, Li was appointed by President Bill Clinton to NCI's National Cancer Advisory Board. He died in 2015 of Alzheimer's disease.

== Discovery of Li-Fraumeni Syndrome ==
In 1969, Li with Joseph Fraumeni identified 24 families with a high risk of cancer throughout generations of family members. Their research and discovery in the abstract of Li and Fraumeni's paper described their method and results as, "A search of the Cancer Family Registry of the National Cancer Institute revealed 24 kindreds with the syndrome of sarcoma, breast carcinoma, and other neoplasms in young patients. Cancer developed in an autosomal dominant pattern in 151 blood relatives, 119 (79%) of whom were affected before 45 years of age. These young patients had a total of 50 bone and soft tissue sarcomas of diverse histological subtypes and 28 breast cancers. Additional features of the syndrome included an excess of brain tumors (14 cases), leukemia (9 cases), and adrenocortical carcinoma (4 cases) before age 45 years. These neoplasms also accounted for 73% of the multiple primary cancers occurring in 15 family members. Six of these patients had second cancers linked to radiotherapy. The diversity of tumor types in this syndrome suggests pathogenetic mechanisms which differ from hereditary cancers arising in single organs or tissues. The syndrome is presently diagnosed on clinical grounds; laboratory markers are needed to identify high-risk individuals and families and to provide insights into susceptibility mechanisms that may be shared by a wide variety of cancers."

Following these families for twenty years along with the 1990 discovery of inherited (germline) p53 gene mutations led to these mutations as being linked to causing Li–Fraumeni Syndrome. The p53 gene is known as the tumor suppressor gene.

== Awards ==
- 1999 Medal of Honor for Clinical Research, American Cancer Society
- 1998 Harry and Elsa Jiler Clinical Research Professorship, American Cancer Society
- 1995 Award for Research Excellence in Cancer Epidemiology and Prevention, American Association for Cancer Research/American Cancer Society
- 1995 Charles S. Mott Prize, General Motors Cancer Research Foundation
