= Charles J. Sherr =

- Born: 1944 (age 81–82); New York City
- Education: New York University; Oberlin College
- Spouse: Martine Roussel
- Scientific career
- Workplaces: St. Jude Children's Research Hospital; National Cancer Institute

Charles J. Sherr (born 1944) is the chair of the Tumor Cell Biology Department at St. Jude Children's Research Hospital. He studies tumor suppressor genes and cell division.

Sherr received his AB from Oberlin College and his MD/PhD from New York University in 1972. He did a residency in pathology at Bellevue Hospital. After one year, he joined the US Public Health Service and the National Cancer Institute in 1973, and was hired as staff in 1975. In 1977, he became head of the viral pathology section of the Division of Cancer Cause and Prevention. He relocated to St Jude in 1983, and became an HHMI Investigator in 1988. He has received several awards for his research in cyclin-dependent kinases and their role in cell cycle and cancer growth.

He is married to Martine Roussel, a biologist, and has 3 children.

== Awards and honors ==
- 1986 Elected member of the American Society for Clinical Investigation
- 1995 Elected member of the National Academy of Sciences
- 1995 Elected member of the American Society for Cell Biology
- 2000 Pezcoller Foundation-AACR International Award in Cancer Research
- 2000 Ernst W. Bertner Award for Cancer Research, MD Anderson Cancer Center
- 2000 Bristol-Myers Squibb Award for Basic Cancer Research
- 2003 Landon Prize, American Association for Cancer Research
- 2004 Charles S. Mott Prize
- 2004 Elected Member of the Institute of Medicine now National Academy of Medicine
- 2010 Elected fellow of the American Association for the Advancement of Science
- 2013 Elected member of the American Academy of Arts and Sciences
- 2013 Elected to the AACR Academy
- 2013 Prize for Scientific Excellence in Medicine by the American-Italian Cancer Foundation
