= David Botstein =

American biologist (1942–2026)

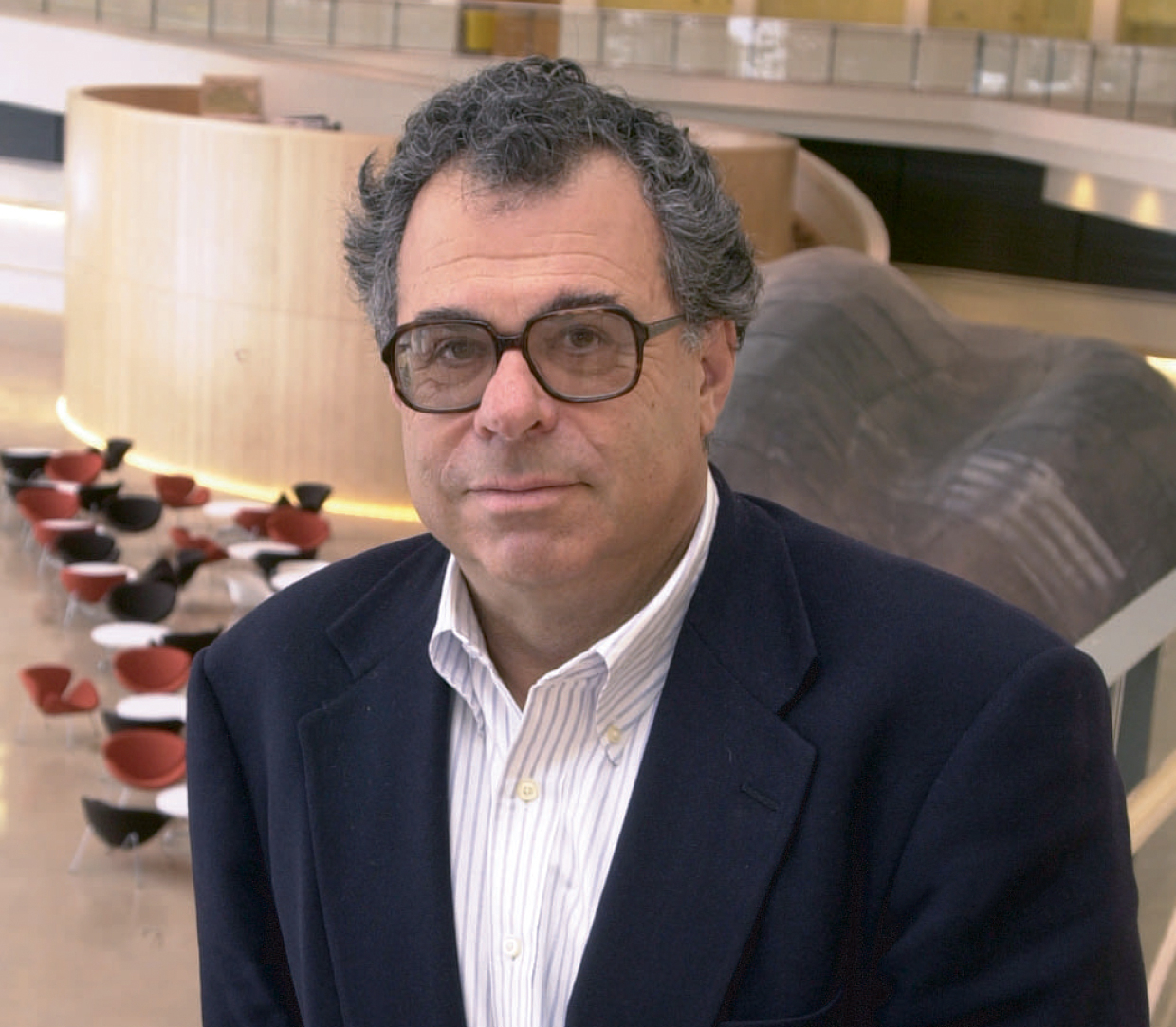
- Born: David Botsztejn; September 8, 1942; Zurich, Switzerland
- Died: February 27, 2026 (aged 83); Palo Alto, California, U.S.
- Education: Harvard University; University of Michigan
- Known for: Genetic linkage map using restriction fragment length polymorphisms
- Relatives: Leon Botstein (brother)
- Awards: Eli Lilly and Company Award in Microbiology (1978); Genetics Society of America Medal (1988); Allan Award of the American Society of Human Genetics (1989); Rosenstiel Award (1991); Novartis-Drew Award (2003); Gruber Prize in Genetics (2003); Albany Medical Center Prize (2010); Dan David Prize (2012); Breakthrough Prize in Life Sciences (2013); Warren Alpert Foundation Prize (2013); Double Helix Medal (2015); Thomas Hunt Morgan Medal (2020)
- Scientific career
- Fields: Genetics
- Workplaces: MIT; Stanford University; Genentech; Princeton University
- Thesis: The Synthesis and Maturation of Phage-P22 DNA (1967)
- Doctoral students: Olga Troyanskaya; Fred Winston; Douglas Koshland; Tim Stearns
- Other notable students: Michael Eisen (postdoc)
- Website: lsi.princeton.edu/people/david-botstein molbio.princeton.edu/people/david-botstein

David Botstein (September 8, 1942 – February 27, 2026) was an American biologist. He was the director of the Lewis-Sigler Institute for Integrative Genomics at Princeton University from 2003 to 2013 and was the Anthony B. Evnin Professor of Genomics. From 2013 to 2023, he was the founding Chief Science Officer of Calico, a biotechnology company with a focus on the biology of aging to devise interventions to enable people to lead longer and healthier lives.

== Early life and education ==
David Botsztejn was born in Zurich, Switzerland on September 8, 1942. His parents, Chaim and Anna Botsztejn (later Charles and Anne Botstein), were Jewish research physicians from Poland, his father a radiation oncologist and his mother a pediatrician. In 1949, the family emigrated to the United States, where their surname was changed to Botstein.

Botstein graduated from the Bronx High School of Science in 1959, and Harvard University in 1963. He started his Ph.D. work under Maurice Sanford Fox at the Massachusetts Institute of Technology, then moved and received a Ph.D. from the University of Michigan in 1967 for work on P22 phage.

== Career ==
Botstein taught at the Massachusetts Institute of Technology, where he became a professor of genetics. Botstein joined Genentech, Inc. in 1987 as vice president – science. In 1990, he became chairman of the Department of Genetics at Stanford University. Botstein was elected to the U.S. National Academy of Sciences in 1981 and to the Institute of Medicine in 1993.

He was the director of the Integrated Science Program at Princeton University.

In 1980, Botstein and his colleagues Ray White, Mark Skolnick, and Ronald W. Davis proposed a method for constructing a genetic linkage map using restriction fragment length polymorphisms that was used in subsequent years to identify several human disease genes including Huntington's and BRCA1. Variations of this method were used in the mapping efforts that predated and enabled the sequencing phase of the Human Genome Project.

In 1998, Botstein and his postdoctoral fellow Michael Eisen, together with graduate student Paul Spellman and colleague Patrick Brown, developed a statistical method and graphical interface that is widely used to interpret genomic data including microarray data. This approach was refined and applied for diverse applications, including for a molecular classification of heterogenous tumors using gene expression. These efforts included work on discovery of tumor subtypes with Lou Staudt, Ash Alizadeh and Ronald Levy, yielding a refined classification of diffuse large B cell lymphomas, and in painting the molecular portraits for refined classification of breast cancers with Anne-Lise Børresen-Dale and Charles Perou. He has subsequently worked on the creation of the influential Gene Ontology with Michael Ashburner and Suzanna Lewis. He was one of the founding editors of the journal Molecular Biology of the Cell, along with Erkki Ruoslahti and Keith Yamamoto.

In 2013, Botstein was named chief scientific officer of Google's anti-aging health startup Calico.

== Personal life and death ==
Botstein was an alumnus of Camp Rising Sun. He was the brother of the conductor Leon Botstein and of the pediatric cardiologist Eva Botstein Griepp.

Botstein died in Palo Alto, California, on February 27, 2026, at the age of 83.

His cause of death was Parkinson's disease at an assisted living facility.

== Awards ==
Botstein has won the Eli Lilly and Company Award in Microbiology (1978), the Genetics Society of America Medal (1988, with Ira Herskowitz), the Allan Award of the American Society of Human Genetics (1989, with Ray White), the Gruber Prize in Genetics (2003), the Albany Medical Center Prize (2010, with Eric Lander and Francis Collins), and the Dan David Prize in 2012. In 2013, he was awarded the $3 million Breakthrough Prize in Life Sciences for his work and in 2020 the Thomas Hunt Morgan Medal of the Genetics Society of America. In 2016, Semantic Scholar AI program included Botstein on its list of most top ten most influential biomedical researchers.

Academic offices
Preceded by Shirley Tilghman	Director; Lewis-Sigler Institute for Integrative Genomics; Princeton University; 2003–2015	Succeeded by Michael Levine
