= Simply Ming =

- Genre: Cooking
- Presented by: Ming Tsai
- Country of origin: United States
- Original language: English
- No. of seasons: 18
- No. of episodes: 379

Production
- Executive producers: Ming Tsai; Laurie Donnelly; Julia Harrison (2003–2015)
- Production location: Milford, Massachusetts
- Running time: 27 minutes
- Production companies: WGBH-TV; Ming East-West, LLC

Original release
- Network: WGBH-TV
- Release: October 4, 2003 – present

Simply Ming is a television cooking show hosted by chef Ming Tsai that is produced by WGBH Boston and Ming East-West, LLC. The show is distributed by American Public Television.

== Overview ==
The initial premise of the show consisted of Ming presenting a master recipe, which he would use in all of the dishes prepared during the episode. Occasionally, Ming would go on location to spotlight a particular component used in or related to that episode's recipes. Later episodes also featured guest chefs whom Ming invited to the show; these special guests then use the master recipe in a dish of their own. Sometimes one of Ming's family would be featured on some episodes.

Another season followed the same format, except that the master recipe gave way to what Ming had called a master pair: two ingredients, one typically regarded as Western (i.e. black pepper, truffle oil, avocado, cranberries) and one typically regarded as Eastern (i.e. soybeans, sake, ponzu, Thai basil), are used in all the dishes prepared in each episode.

The 2014 season followed another format. Ming would travel around the world and sometimes would be in his studio, where he would cook improvised recipes with renowned chefs from ingredients that would be kept secret beforehand. The guest would go first, and Ming would go last.

== Broadcast ==
The series is available on public television stations (mostly PBS stations), and the Create network. It's also shown on the LifeStyle Food channel in Australia. Select episodes are available for viewing on the official Ming Tsai website via the Episodes page.

== Home media ==
In 2005, WGBH Boston Video released a DVD set called "Simply Ming - The Complete Collection", it contains 3 discs containing several episodes of the series, It is based on Season 2, which was broadcast in 2004. The most recent release is "Simply Ming: Cooking with Friends & Family", released by PBS Distribution in 2012.
