= James A. Miller (biochemist) =

American biochemist

James Alexander Miller (de) (May 27, 1915 – December 24, 2000) was an American biochemist who, working alongside his wife Elizabeth C. Miller, was Professor Emeritus of Oncology at the University of Wisconsin-Madison McArdle Laboratory for Cancer Research. Together, they "made seminal discoveries related to the metabolism of synthetic and naturally occurring chemicals to toxic and/or carcinogenic electrophilic metabolites, and to the enzymology and regulation of xenobiotic metabolism." They won the Charles S. Mott Prize in 1980 and were the only husband/wife team jointly elected to membership in the National Academy of Sciences.

== Biography ==
Miller graduated high school in 1933 and due to the Depression, financing a college education would be difficult. For two years, he worked in the welding shop of a steel mill. He used the money to pay for his first year of classes at the University of Pittsburgh.

The Millers research showed that carcinogens "had to be metabolized and undergo enzymatic transformation in order to cause cancer. The first evidence that metabolized carcinogens can modify tissue components, such as nucleic acids and proteins, came from this work."

== Awards and honors ==
In 1978, he won the Canada Gairdner International Award and in 1975, the Rosenstiel Award.
