= The Puzzle Solver =

Nonfiction book about ME/CFS

The Puzzle Solver: A Scientist's Desperate Quest to Cure the Illness that Stole His Son
- Author: Tracie White with Ronald W. Davis
- Language: English
- Genre: Nonfiction; Science writing
- Publisher: Hachette Books
- Publication date: January 5, 2021
- Media type: Hardcover book
- Pages: 240
- ISBN: 978-0-316-49250-8

The Puzzle Solver: A Scientist's Desperate Quest to Cure the Illness that Stole His Son is a book by Tracie White with scientist Ronald W. Davis about Davis's efforts to cure his son Whitney, who has very severe myalgic encephalomyelitis, also called chronic fatigue syndrome (ME/CFS). The book was published on January 5, 2021.

== Publication history ==
The Puzzle Solver began as a work of journalism that Tracie White wrote for Stanford Medicine. She expanded the work into a book (her first) in collaboration with Ronald W. Davis, a renowned scientist and one of the book's subjects. It was published by Hachette on January 5, 2021.

== Content ==
Whitney Dafoe was a photographer and world traveler when at age 23, he was hospitalized on a trip to India, suffering from a stomach ailment. When he returned home, he weighed only 115 pounds and instead of recovering his health steadily declined. He was diagnosed with ME/CFS in 2011 but continued to slip until he was confined to a back room at his parents' home, unable to speak or eat without the assistance of a feeding tube. His one source of hope was his father, world renown scientist Ronald W. Davis (Dafoe shares his last name with his mother, psychologist Janet Dafoe.) Davis is a pioneer of the Human Genome Project, but soon turned all of his research to the study of ME/CFS in a race to cure Whitney and the millions of other patients like him (an estimated 2.8 million in the US have the disease and a quarter are home- or bedbound, like Dafoe, for at least part of their illness).

In 2011, Davis won the Gruber Prize for his "pioneering work in genetic engineering". He spent the $500,000 award seeding his ME/CFS research, hiring other scientists into his lab and eventually launching a foundation dedicated to the project. Through it, Davis began seeding more scientists' work on ME/CFS, developing a worldwide network to work on the disease, historically abandoned by the medical community and its major grant makers like the National Institutes of Health.

== Reception ==
Reviews praised White's writing as well as the book's scientific content. The Publishers Weekly review said, "The author's keen commitment to capturing Dafoe's illness and Davis's work makes for a story of heartbreak balanced with unexpected beauty. White succeeds in casting chronic fatigue syndrome in a new light in this inspirational account." In Al Jazeera, Michaela Haas wrote that the book "paints an intimate portrait of Whitney's journey to diagnosis and his father's fight to find a cure." In the Library Journal, Kelsy Peterson wrote, "Both tragic and uplifting, this title will be of particular interest to readers seeking more information about ME/CFS and anyone curious about medical mysteries." In Booklist, Kathleen McBroom said, "White writes with compassion and empathy, capably handling the technical aspects of current virus genome research. She underlines the crucial need for continuing exploration, especially in light of the possible connection between CFS and COVID-19, which have similar symptoms. This moving account should increase awareness and pressure for an expedited cure."
