= Charles S. Mott Prize =

Scientific prize for cancer research

The Charles S. Mott Prize was awarded annually by the General Motors Cancer Research Foundation as one of a trio of scientific prizes entirely devoted to cancer research, the other two being the Charles F. Kettering Prize and the Alfred P. Sloan, Jr. Prize. The prizes, worth US$250,000, were awarded annually between 1979 and 2005. The awards were generally considered the most prestigious in the field.

The Mott Prize was awarded for "the most outstanding recent contribution related to the cause or prevention of cancer". In 2006, due to financial pressures on the corporation supporting the Foundation, the three awards were consolidated into a single $250,000 General Motors Cancer Research Award.. In 2006, the first and only winner of the General Motors Cancer Research Award was Napoleone Ferrara.

Since 2006 no further prizes have been awarded.

== Laureates ==
- 2005 Gerald Wogan
- 2004 Charles J. Sherr
- 2003 Yuan Chang, Patrick S. Moore
- 2002 Richard Peto
- 2001 Frank E. Speizer, Walter Willett
- 2000 Bert Vogelstein
- 1999 Arnold J. Levine
- 1998 Suzanne Cory, Stanley J. Korsmeyer
- 1997 M. Judah Folkman
- 1996 Paul L. Modrich, Richard Kolodner
- 1995 Frederick Pei Li, Joseph F. Fraumeni
- 1994 Tony Hunter
- 1993 Carlo Croce
- 1992 Brian MacMahon
- 1991 Peter K. Vogt
- 1990 Webster K. Cavenee, Raymond L. White
- 1989 Peter C. Nowell, Janet D. Rowley
- 1988 Alfred G. Knudson
- 1987 R. Palmer Beasley, Jesse Summers
- 1986 Harald zur Hausen
- 1985 J. Christopher Wagner
- 1984 Robert C. Gallo
- 1983 Bruce Ames
- 1982 Denis P. Burkitt
- 1981 Takashi Sugimura
- 1980 James A. Miller, Elizabeth C. Miller
- 1979 Richard Doll
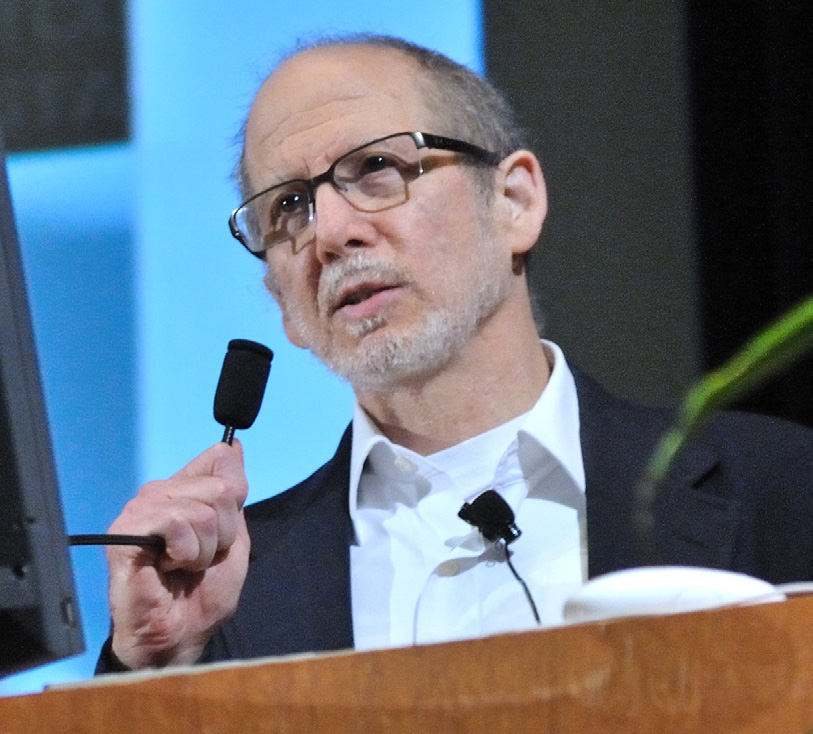
2000: Bert Vogelstein

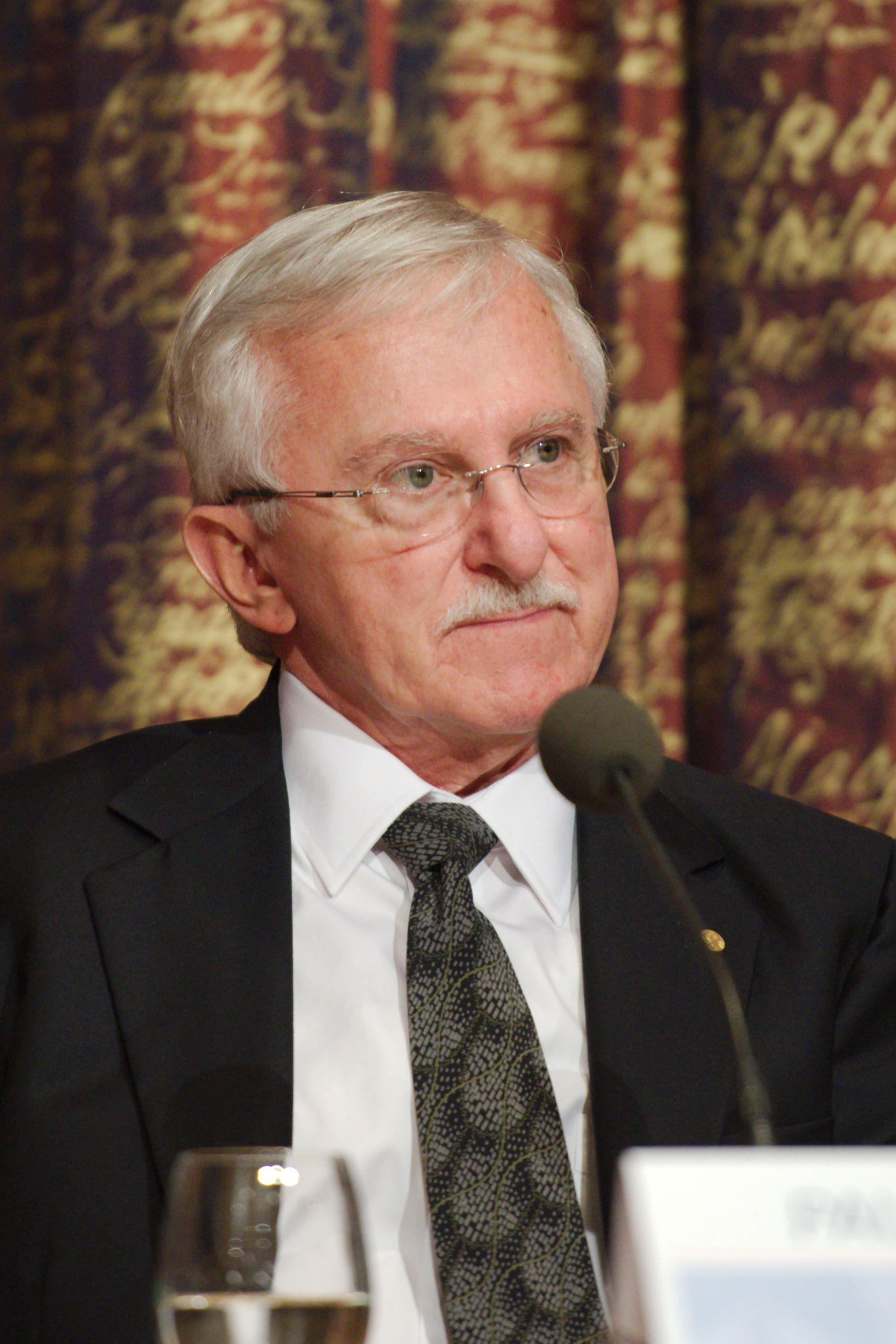
1996: Paul L. Modrich

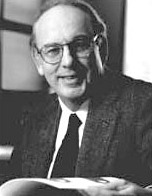
1995: J. F. Fraumeni

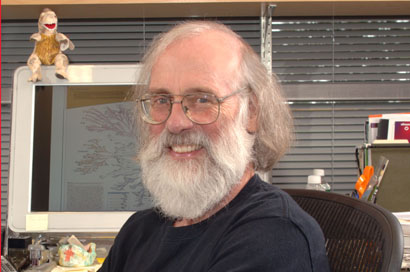
1994:Tony Hunter

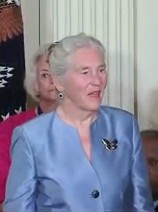
1989: J. D. Rowley

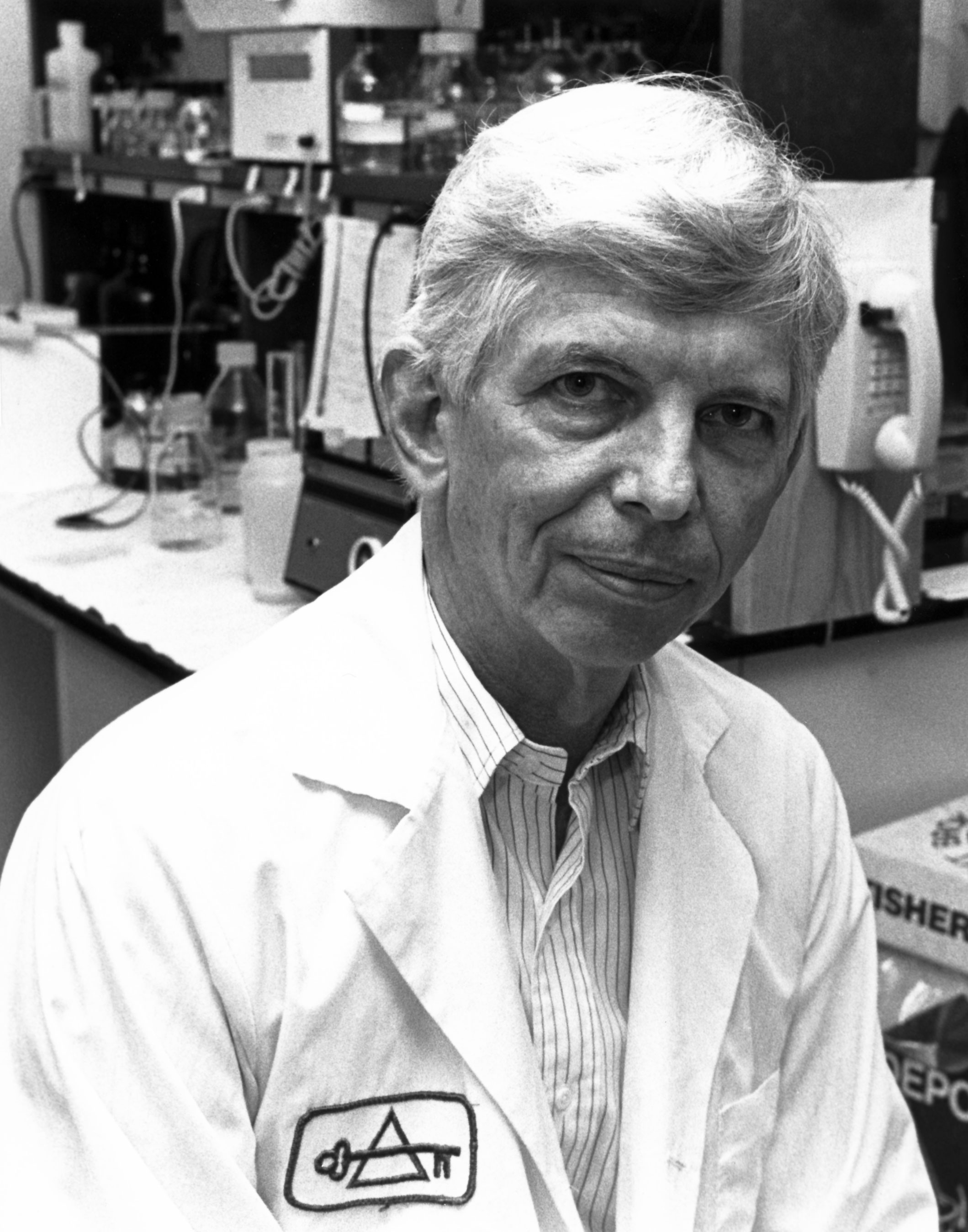
1988: A. G. Knudson

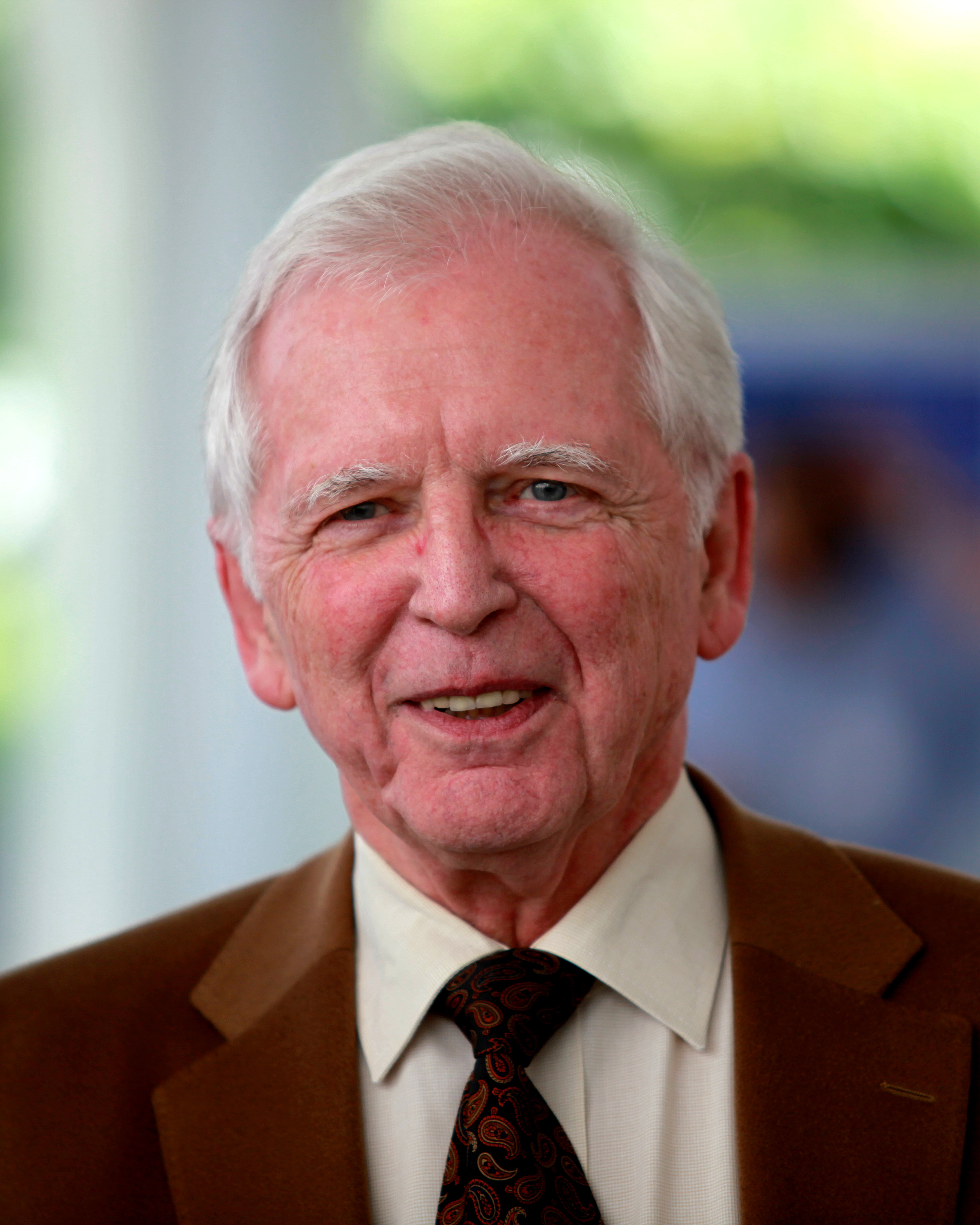
1986: H. zur Hausen

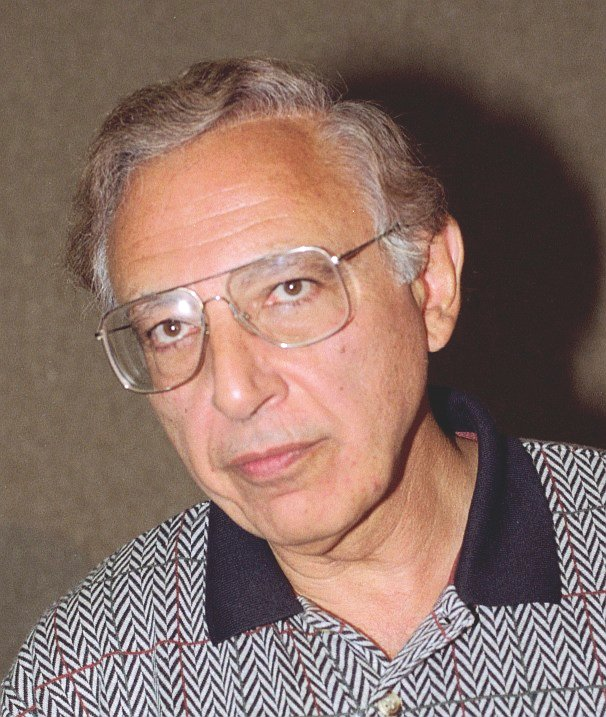
1984: R. C. Gallo

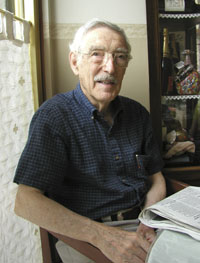
1983: B. N. Ames

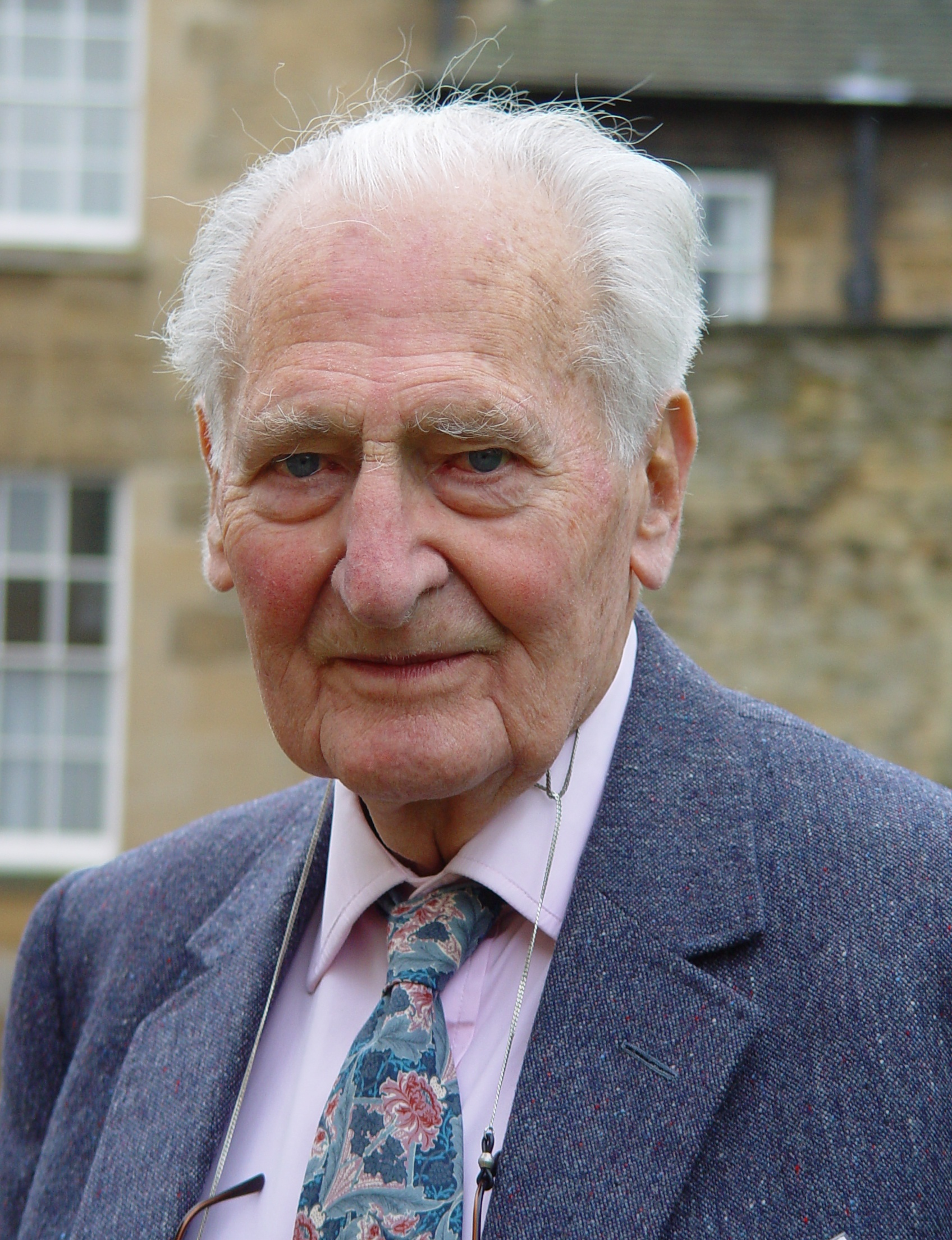
1979: R. Doll

== See also ==
- List of medicine awards
