= Joseph F. Fraumeni Jr. =

American cancer researcher (1933–2026)

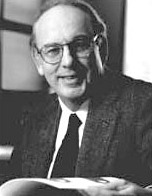
- Born: April 1, 1933; Boston, Massachusetts, U.S.
- Died: June 22, 2026 (aged 93); McLean, Virginia, U.S.
- Education: Harvard College; Duke University; Harvard School of Public Health
- Known for: Co-discovering genetic link to cancer
- Awards: Charles S. Mott Prize
- Scientific career
- Workplaces: National Cancer Institute

Joseph Francis Fraumeni Jr. (April 1, 1933 – June 22, 2026) was an American physician and cancer researcher.

== Early life and career ==
Born in Boston, Fraumeni received an A.B. from Harvard College, an M.D. from Duke University, and an M.Sc. in epidemiology from the Harvard School of Public Health. He completed his medical residency at Johns Hopkins Hospital and Memorial Sloan Kettering Cancer Center. He then joined the National Cancer Institute at the National Institutes of Health in 1962 as a commissioned officer of the U.S. Public Health Service, becoming the founding Director of the Division of Cancer Epidemiology and Genetics in 1995. He stepped down from this position in 2012 to become a senior investigator and advisor to the National Cancer Institute.

Fraumeni was born on April 1, 1933. One of Fraumeni's research accomplishments was the identification in 1969 with Frederick Pei Li of four families with an increased susceptibility to multiple forms of cancer in children and young adults. Tracing these families and 20 others for twenty years led to the characterization of what became known as Li–Fraumeni syndrome and the discovery in 1990 of inherited mutations of the tumor suppressor gene, p53, as the underlying mechanism in most affected families.

Fraumeni died in McLean, Virginia on June 22, 2026, at the age of 93.

== Awards ==
Fraumeni has been recognized with numerous honors and awards for his research into the genetic and environmental determinants of cancer. Among them are the Abraham Lilienfeld Award from the American College of Epidemiology, John Snow Award from the American Public Health Association, James D. Bruce Award from the American College of Physicians, Nathan Davis Award from the American Medical Association, Charles S. Mott Prize (with F.P. Li) from the General Motors Cancer Research Foundation, Medal of Honor from the International Agency for Research on Cancer and the American Cancer Society, and Lifetime Achievement Award from the American Association for Cancer Research. Fraumeni was an elected member of the National Academy of Sciences, National Academy of Medicine, Association of American Physicians, and American Academy of Arts and Sciences. He has over 900 scientific publications, including several books on the causes and prevention of cancer.

- 2013 Fellow of the AACR Academy
- 2011 Fellow, American Academy of Arts and Sciences
- 2009 AACR Award for Lifetime Achievement in Cancer Research
- 2002 Member, National Academy of Sciences
- 1997 James D. Bruce Memorial Award, American College of Physicians
- 1995 Charles S. Mott Prize, General Motors Cancer Research Foundation
- 1995 John Snow Award, American Public Health Association
- 1994 Member, Association of American Physicians
- 1993 Abraham M. Lilienfeld Award, American College of Epidemiology
- 1993 AACR-American Cancer Society Award for Research Excellence in Epidemiology and Prevention
- 1992 Member, Institute of Medicine
- 1992 Fellow, American Association for the Advancement of Science
- 1983–1986 Board of Directors, American Association for Cancer Research
- 1967 Fellow, American College of Physicians

== Sources ==
- Biography of Joseph F. Fraumeni Jr., M.D., M.Sc. at DCEG
- DCEG Publications Database Search for Dr. Fraumeni
