= Children's Hospital Oakland Research Institute =

US research institute

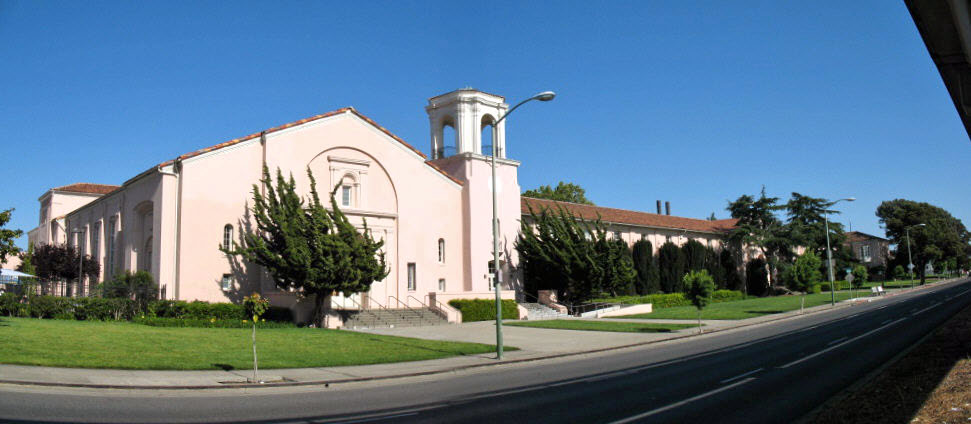
- CHORI North Campus
- Established: 1959
- Faculty: 55
- Staff: 280
- Formerly called: Bruce Lyon Memorial Research Laboratory (BLMRL)
- Address: 5700 Martin Luther King Jr. Way
- Location: Oakland, California, United States
- Coordinates: 37°50′33″N 122°16′10″W
- Interactive map of Children's Hospital Oakland Research Institute
- Website: chori.org

Children's Hospital Oakland Research Institute (CHORI) was a biomedical research institute affiliated with California’s pediatric medical center, UCSF Benioff Children's Hospital Oakland. UCSF assumed building operations in 2020 and it is now called the Martin Luther King Research Building.

CHORI was based in Oakland, California, and housed a 100,000-square-foot (9,300 m^{2}) biomedical research facility. It included eight research centers that focused on research on cancer, critical care medicine, genetics, immunobiology and vaccine development, blood and marrow transplantation and cellular therapies, nutrition and metabolism, prevention of obesity, cardiovascular disease and diabetes, sickle cell disease and thalassemia.

The National Institutes of Health was CHORI's primary funding source.

== Research centers ==
- Center for Cancer
- Center for Critical Care Medicine
- Center for Genetics
- Center for Immunobiology & Vaccine Development
- The Jordan Family Center for Blood and Marrow Transplantation and Cellular Therapies Research
- Center for Nutrition & Metabolism
- Center for Prevention of Obesity, Cardiovascular Disease & Diabetes
- Center for Sickle Cell Disease & Thalassemia

== Research services ==
- BACPAC Resource Center
- Cell Sorting
- Elemental Analysis
- Genetic Testing
- Mass Spectrometry
- Microscope Imaging
- Molecular Diagnostics
- Sibling Donor Cord Blood

== Research applications ==
CHORI’s translational research applications included providing cures for blood diseases, developing new vaccines for infectious diseases, and discovering new treatment protocols for previously fatal or debilitating conditions such as cancers, sickle cell disease and thalassemia, diabetes, asthma, HIV/AIDS, pediatric obesity, nutritional deficiencies, birth defects, hemophilia and cystic fibrosis. CHORI was also a teaching institute with educational programs for high school, college, doctoral and post-doctoral students.

== Research achievements ==
CHORI was a leading center for the use of cord blood and bone marrow transplantation in children with sickle cell anemia and thalassemia, and offered the only not-for-profit Sibling Donor Cord Blood Program in the world.
