= Li Hanhun =

Chinese general (1895–1987)

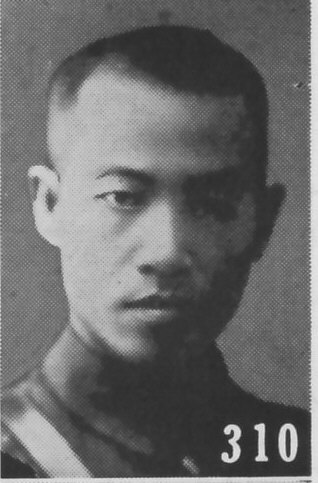
Li Hanhun as pictured in The Most Recent Biographies of Chinese Dignitaries

Li Hanhun (traditional Chinese: 李漢魂; simplified Chinese: 李汉魂; pinyin: Lǐ Hànhún; 7 October 1895 – 30 June 1987), courtesy name Bohao (伯豪) and assumed name Nanhua (南華) was a Chinese (National Revolutionary Army during the Second Sino-Japanese War. A portrayal of his conduct as a frontline commander in 1938 can be found in chapter 3 of Freda Utley's China at War. He served as years 1939–1945, he served as chairman of the Guangdong provincial government. His last role in public life was as Interior Minister during the acting-presidency of Li Zongren, the last Kuomintang administration in mainland China.

== Biography ==
Li was born in Wuchuan, Guangdong. At age 17 Li joined the anti-Qing Tongmenghui. He became a career military officer after graduating from the Baoding Military Academy in the academy's sixth graduating class in 1919. He was a division commander in the Fourth Army of the National Revolutionary Army during the Northern Expedition.

As tensions with Japan were brewing in 1936 and factions within the Kuomintang were in power struggles verging on civil war, Li gave up his commission with the leader of one faction Chen Jitang, while issuing a request to all Chinese forces to unite under the leadership of Chiang Kai-shek in resisting Japan aggression. In 1938, as commander of the 64th Army in the Battle of Lanfeng, he defeated General Kenji Doihara in Luowangzhai (羅王砦), a depot town on the Longhai Railway where Doihara headquartered his main forces; Doihara had been the principal commander of Japanese forces in China and had been engaging in efforts to control China's major railroad systems.

From 1939 to 1945, Li served as Governor of war-torn and partially occupied Guangdong Province, during which he devoted himself to good governance and war relief efforts. As part of the latter efforts, he collaborated with and supported his wife Wu Chu-Fang in a range of enterprises to mitigate the problems of war-displaced refugees.

In 1947 after the war had ended, Li was granted permission for two years of medical leave to the United States, and a study tour to the Americas and Europe to observe post war reconstruction. His wife and children accompanied him to the US. Li returned to China in 1949, participated in the national election in which he was elected to the National Assembly, and also served as Minister of Interior during the brief acting-presidency of Li Zongren. When the Communists took over the mainland at the end of 1949, Li emigrated to the United States to rejoin his family there.

Though his career in public life in China had mainly been in military service and War zone governance, General Li Hanhun was self-described as a reluctant warrior in his own writings and in his life-long devotion to Buddhism and Chinese classical learning. He was the principal facilitator in the 1934 restoration, under the abbot Xuyun, of the sixth century Nanhua Temple in Shaoguang, Guangdong; Li's calligraphy on pillars and doorways of that Temple are still displayed today. His collected writings of essays, poetry, history, diaries and autobiography have now all been published.

From 1949 onward, Li lived in the New York City area for the remainder of his life. Together with his wife Wu Chu-Fang, they operated a series of three Chinese restaurants, the one in White Plains, the China Garden, being particularly successful and famous in its time. The family history, against a backdrop of world events, is recounted in the book by his daughter Virginia Li: From One Root Many Flowers: A Century of Family Life in China and America. In 1987, he died in New York City. Former Harvard Professor Frederick Pei Li and Victor Hao Li, Stanford Law School professor and former president of the East–West Center, were his sons.
