= Li–Fraumeni syndrome =

Autosomal dominant cancer syndrome

- Other names: Sarcoma family syndrome of Li and Fraumeni, SBLA
- Li–Fraumeni syndrome is inherited via an autosomal dominant manner
- Specialty: Oncology, medical genetics, neurology
- Frequency: 0.02214%

Li–Fraumeni syndrome (LFS) is a rare, autosomal dominant, hereditary disorder that predisposes carriers to cancer development. It was named after two American physicians, Frederick Pei Li and Joseph F. Fraumeni Jr., who first recognized the syndrome after reviewing the medical records and death certificates of childhood rhabdomyosarcoma patients. The disease is also known as SBLA, for the Sarcoma, Breast, Leukemia, and Adrenal Gland cancers that it is known to cause.

== Etiology ==
LFS is caused by germline mutations (also called genetic variants) in the TP53 tumor suppressor gene, which encodes a transcription factor (p53) that normally regulates the cell cycle and prevents genomic mutations. The variants can be inherited, or can arise from mutations early in embryogenesis, or in one of the parent's germ cells.

LFS is thought to occur in about 1 in 5,000 individuals in the general population. In Southern and Southeastern Brazil, there is a common founder mutation, p.R337H, that occurs in about 1 in every 375 people. LFS is inherited in an autosomal dominant fashion which means that a person with LFS has a 50% chance to pass the syndrome on in each pregnancy (and a 50% chance to not pass on the syndrome).

In 2025, a sperm donor from Copenhagen was discovered to have a germ line mutation causing LFS, having fathered at least 197 children in 14 countries. A presenter at a May 2025 genetics conference discovered that out of 67 children conceived from this donor, 23 had the mutation and 10 had developed cancer.

== Clinical presentation ==
Li–Fraumeni syndrome is characterized by early onset of cancer, a wide variety of types of cancers, and development of multiple cancers throughout one's life.

=== LFS: mutations in TP53 ===
TP53 is a tumor suppressor gene on chromosome 17 that codes for the protein p53. It normally assists in the control of cell division and growth through action on the normal cell cycle. TP53 typically becomes expressed due to cellular stressors, such as DNA damage, and can halt the cell cycle to assist with either the repair of repairable DNA damage, or can induce apoptosis of a cell with irreparable damage. The repair of "bad" DNA, or the apoptosis of a cell, prevents the proliferation of damaged cells and the development of cancer.

Pathogenic and likely pathogenic variants in the TP53 gene can inhibit its normal function and allow cells with damaged DNA to continue to divide. If these DNA mutations are left unchecked, some cells can divide uncontrollably, forming tumors (cancers). Many individuals with Li–Fraumeni syndrome have been shown to be heterozygous for a TP53 variant. Recent studies have shown that 60% to 80% of classic LFS families harbor detectable germ-line TP53 mutations, the majority of which are missense mutations in the DNA-binding domain. These missense mutations cause a decrease in the ability of p53 to bind to DNA, thus inhibiting the normal TP53 mechanism.

=== LFS-Like (LFS-L) ===
Families who do not conform to the criteria of classical Li–Fraumeni syndrome have been termed "LFS-Like". LFS-L individuals generally do not have any detectable TP53 variants, and tend to meet either the Birch or Eeles criteria.

=== Clinical ===
The classical LFS malignancies—sarcoma, cancers of the breast, brain, and adrenal glands—comprise about 80% of all cancers that occur in Li-Fraumeni syndrome.

The risk of developing any invasive cancer (excluding skin cancer) is about 50% by age 30 (1% in the general population) and is 90% by age 70. Early-onset breast cancer accounts for 25% of all the cancers in this syndrome. This is followed by soft-tissue sarcomas (20%), bone sarcoma (15%), and brain tumors—especially glioblastomas—(13%). Other tumours seen in this syndrome include leukemia, lymphoma, and adrenocortical carcinoma.

The table below depicts tumor site distribution of variants for families followed in the LFS Study at the National Cancer Institute's (NCI) Division of Cancer Epidemiology and Genetics (DCEG): About 95% of females with LFS develop breast cancer by age 60 years; the majority of these occur before age 45 years lending females with this syndrome to have almost a 100% lifetime risk of developing cancer.

Cancer risks by sex and age
Age	20 years old	40 years old	60 years old
Men	25%	40%	88%
Women	18%	75%	>95%

== Diagnosis ==
Germline variants in the TP53 tumor suppressor gene were discovered to be the primary cause of Li–Fraumeni syndrome in 1990.

Li–Fraumeni syndrome is diagnosed if a person has a pathogenic or likely pathogenic TP53 variant and/or if these three Classic Criteria are met:

- The patient has been diagnosed with a sarcoma at a young age (below 45).
- A first-degree relative has been diagnosed with any cancer at a young age (below 45).
- Another first- or a second-degree relative has been diagnosed with any cancer at a young age (below 45) or with a sarcoma at any age.

LFS should also be suspected in individuals who meet other published criteria.

2015 Revised Chompret Criteria:

- A proband with a tumor belonging to the LFS tumor spectrum (premenopausal breast cancer, soft tissue sarcoma, osteosarcoma, central nervous system (CNS) tumor, adrenocortical carcinoma) before age 46 years AND at least one first- or second-degree relative with an LFS tumor (except breast cancer if the proband has breast cancer) before age 56 years or with multiple tumors; OR
- A proband with multiple tumors (except multiple breast tumors), two of which belong to the LFS tumor spectrum and the first of which occurred before age 46 years; OR
- A proband with adrenocortical carcinoma, choroid plexus tumor, or rhabdomyosarcoma of embryonal anaplastic subtype, irrespective of family history; OR
- Breast cancer before age 31 years

Birch Criteria for Li Fraumeni-like syndrome:

- A proband with any childhood cancer, sarcoma, brain tumor, or adrenal cortical carcinoma diagnosed before age 45, AND
- A first- or second-degree relative with a typical LFS malignancy (sarcoma, leukemia, or cancers of the breast, brain or adrenal cortex) regardless of age at diagnosis, AND
- A first- or second-degree relative with any cancer diagnosed before age 60

Eeles Criteria for Li Fraumeni-like Syndrome:

- Two different tumors that are part of extended LFS in first- or second-degree relatives at any age (sarcoma, breast cancer, brain tumor, leukemia, adrenocortical carcinoma, melanoma, prostate cancer, and pancreatic cancer).

If an individual has a personal or family history concerning for LFS, they should discuss the risks, benefits, and limitations of genetic testing with their healthcare provider or a genetic counselor.

== Management ==
Genetic counseling and genetic testing for the TP53 gene can confirm a diagnosis of LFS. People with LFS require early and regular cancer screening following the "Toronto Protocol":

- Children and adults undergo comprehensive annual physical examinations every 6 to 12 months
- All patients consult a physician promptly for evaluation of lingering symptoms and illnesses
- Ultrasound of abdomen and pelvis every 3 to 4 months from birth to age 18 years
- Colonoscopy and upper endoscopy every 2 to 5 years beginning at age 25 or 5 years before the earliest known GI cancer in the family
- Annual dermatological exam starting at age 18 years
- Annual whole-body MRI
- Annual brain MRI and neurological exam
- Annual prostate-specific antigen (PA) starting at age 40
- Breast awareness beginning at age 18
- Clinical breast exam every 6 to 12 months starting at age 20
- Annual breast MRI age 20 to 29; annual breast MRI alternating with mammogram age 30 to 75
- Consideration of risk-reducing mastectomy (surgery to remove the breast tissue)
- Families and individuals should consider participating in a peer-support group
