= Elizabeth C. Miller =

American biochemist (1920–1987)

Elizabeth Cavert Miller
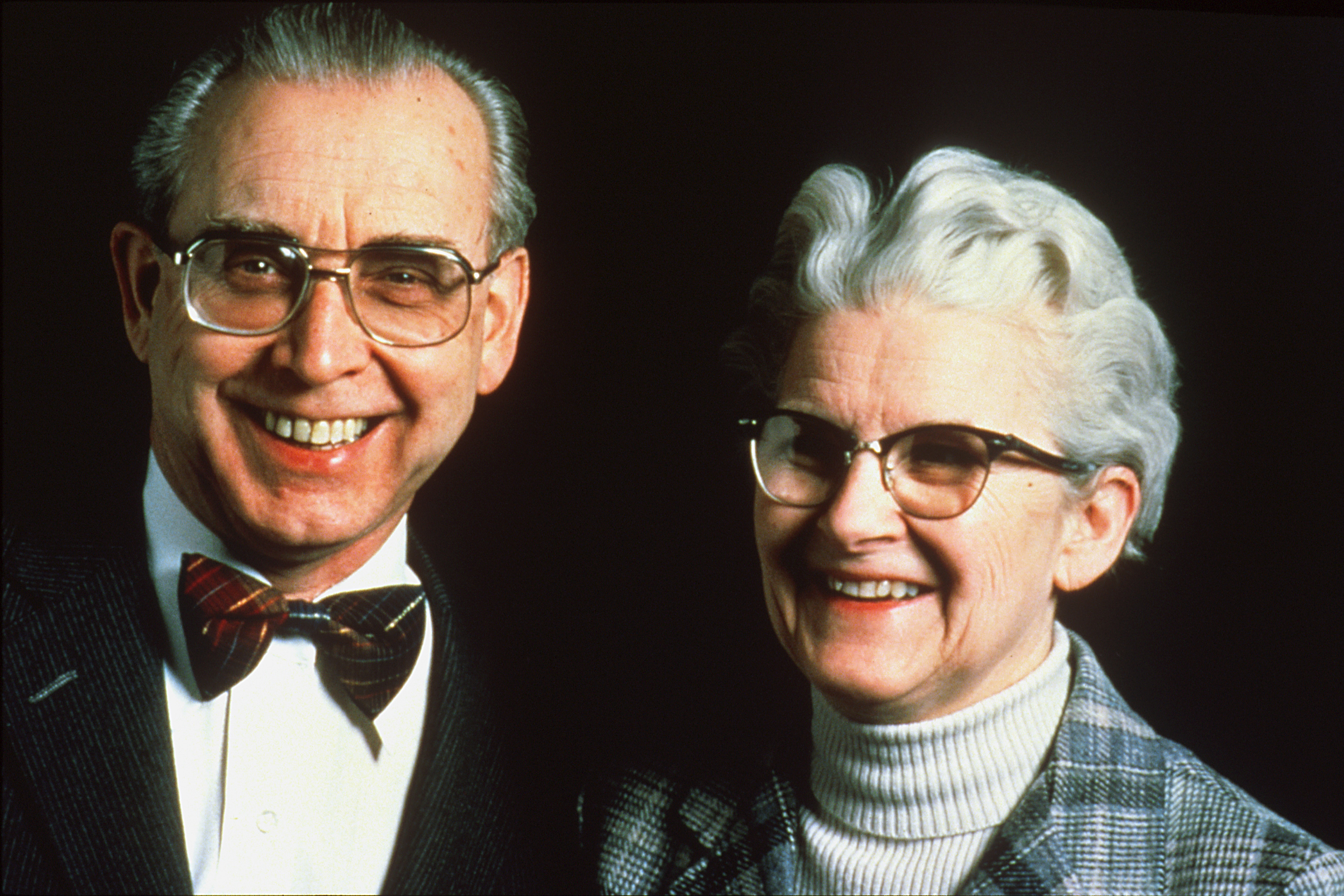
- James Miller and Elizabeth Miller (right)
- Born: May 2, 1920; Minneapolis, Minnesota, United States
- Died: October 14, 1987 (aged 67)
- Education: University of Minnesota
- Spouse: James A. Miller
- Scientific career
- Fields: Biochemistry
- Workplaces: University of Wisconsin-Madison
- Doctoral advisor: Carl Baumann

Elizabeth Cavert Miller (May 2, 1920 – October 14, 1987) was an American biochemist, known for fundamental research into the chemical mechanism of cancer carcinogenesis, working closely with her husband James A. Miller.

== Biography ==
Miller was born on May 2, 1920, in Minneapolis, Minnesota, United States. She was the daughter William Lane Cavert, an economist at the Federal Land Bank in Minneapolis, and Mary Elizabeth Cavert (née Mead).

Miller studied biochemistry at the University of Minnesota (Bachelor's degree 1941, Master's degree 1943). In 1945 she received her doctorate under Carl Baumann as a Wisconsin Alumni Research Foundation scholar. As a postgraduate, she worked at the McArdle Laboratory for Cancer Research at the University of Wisconsin-Madison, where she and her husband (since 1942) James A. Miller studied chemical carcinogenesis. From 1973 to 1987, she was deputy director (associate director) of the McArdle Laboratory. She was also a professor of oncology at the University of Wisconsin-Madison. She died of kidney cancer.

In 1947, the Millers discovered that an azo dye could cause cancer by binding to proteins in the livers of rats. In 1949, they showed that the ability of one substance to affect cancer by the action of another chemical influences the processing in the metabolism, and in 1960 they showed the existence of metabolites that were stronger carcinogens than the starting material. These discoveries also had significance for other areas of toxicology. After the discovery of the exact genetic role of DNA around 1953, the Millers were able to detect the carcinogenic effects of many chemicals as a result of their interaction with DNA. After demonstrating in the 1960s that chemical carcinogens could be detected by increased mutation rates, they examined the carcinogenicity of a wide range of substances found in the environment, industrial chemicals, and food.

Elizabeth Miller was editor of the Cancer Research journal of the American Association for Cancer Research from 1954 to 1964. In 1957, she became the first woman elected to the association's board of directors. From 1976 to 1977 she was President of the association. From 1978 to 1980 she was on the council (Cancer Panel) of the National Cancer Institute. In 1978 she became a member of the National Academy of Sciences and in 1981 she was admitted to the American Academy of Arts and Sciences.

In 1980 she was awarded the Charles S. Mott Prize for Cancer Research with James A. Miller and both received numerous other awards, including the 1975 Papanicolaou Prize and the 1978 Founders Award from the Chemical Institute of Toxicology and the Gairdner Foundation International Award.

In January 2017, Cambridge University Press published volume 61 of the Medical History Journal which contained an issue highlighting the work of Elizabeth Miller and James Miller to ensure that their contributions to the field of cancer-causing chemicals is recognized.

Elizabeth Miller had two daughters with James A. Miller.
