= McArdle Laboratory =

Coordinates: 43.0781°N 89.4316°W

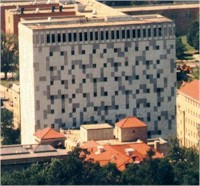
McArdle Laboratory for Cancer Research

The McArdle Laboratory for Cancer Research is a basic cancer research facility located on the University of Wisconsin–Madison campus in Madison, Wisconsin. It houses the university's Department of Oncology . The staff of the McArdle Laboratory numbers approximately 200. Twenty-eight faculty members lead research groups focused on various fields such as cancer virology, signal transduction, cell cycle, cancer genetics, and carcinogenesis.

Peer-reviewed grants awarded on a competitive basis by agencies such as the National Cancer Institute, Department of Defense, American Cancer Society, and Susan G. Komen for the Cure provide the major source of research funds for the McArdle Laboratory. A small percentage of McArdle's operating budget is provided by the State of Wisconsin. Private donations and bequests made directly to the McArdle Laboratory play a vital role in the support of the research carried out at the Laboratory.

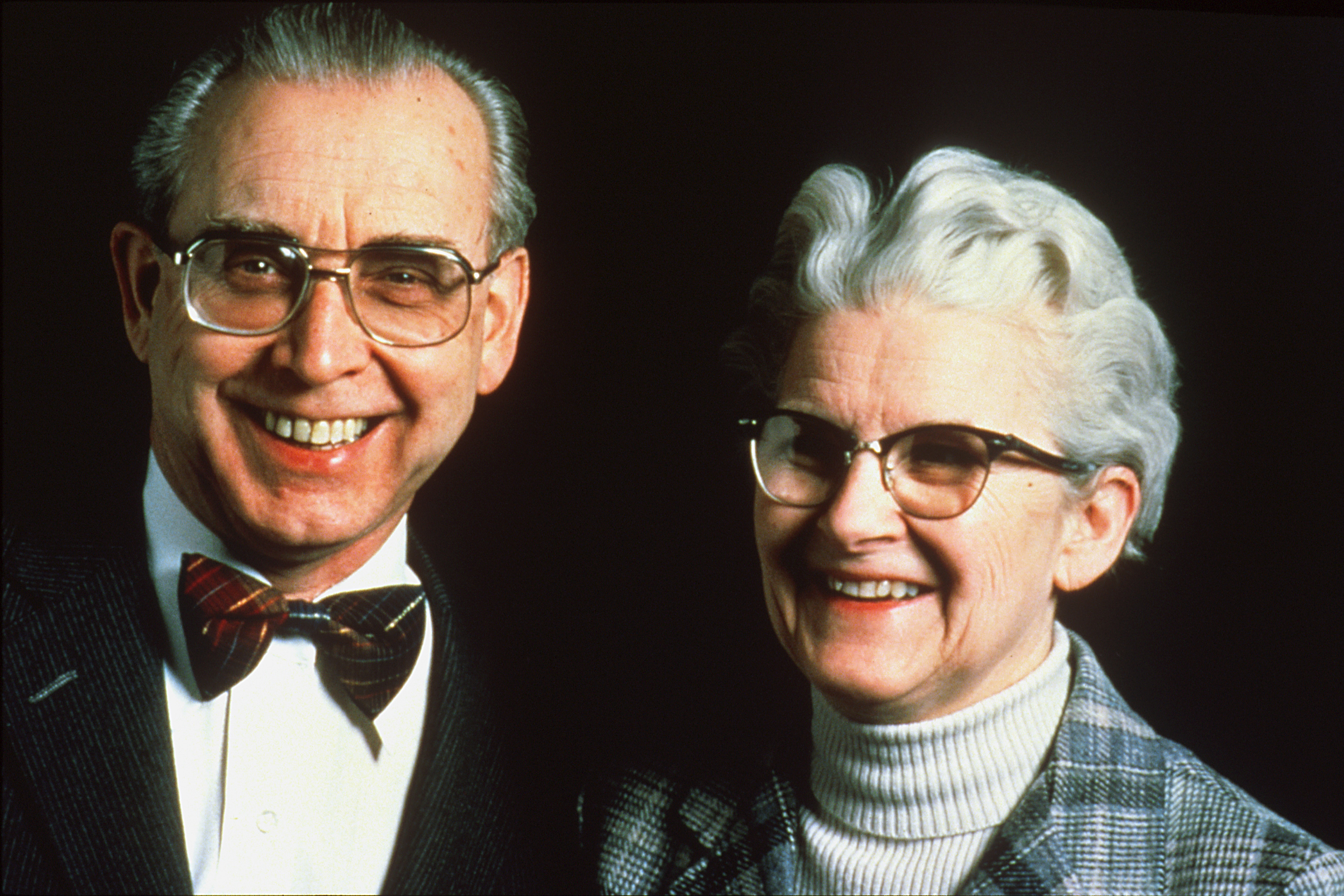
James and Elizabeth Miller, members of the founding faculty

Founding faculty Harold P. Rusch, Roswell Boutwell, Charles Heidelberger, Elizabeth and James Miller, Gerald C. Mueller, and Van Rensselaer Potter helped to establish the international reputation of the McArdle Laboratory and to build the strong foundation of basic cancer research on the University of Wisconsin campus. The former and current staff include recipients of the Bristol Myers Award in Cancer Research; members of the National Academy of Sciences; past presidents of the American Association for Cancer Research; recipients of the American Cancer Society Research Professor and Junior Faculty Research Awards; and members of the National Cancer Advisory Board and the President's Cancer Panel. Howard M. Temin (1934–1994) received the Nobel Prize in Physiology or Medicine (shared with David Baltimore and Renato Dulbecco) in 1975 while a member of the faculty at the McArdle Laboratory.

The training of young scientists for careers in cancer research has been an important aspect of the McArdle Laboratory since its beginning. The McArdle Laboratory was the first cancer research institution in the country to grant a Ph.D. degree in Oncology. The graduate program, now called Cancer Biology, is one of the few programs in the world devoted specifically to cancer research. Over 1400 men and women have received training at the pre- and postdoctoral level at the McArdle Laboratory. Alumni hold research and teaching positions at universities, research institutes, governmental agencies, and in industry around the world. McArdle alum Günter Blobel received the Nobel Prize in Physiology or Medicine in 1999 for "the discovery that proteins have intrinsic signals that govern their transport and localization in the cell".

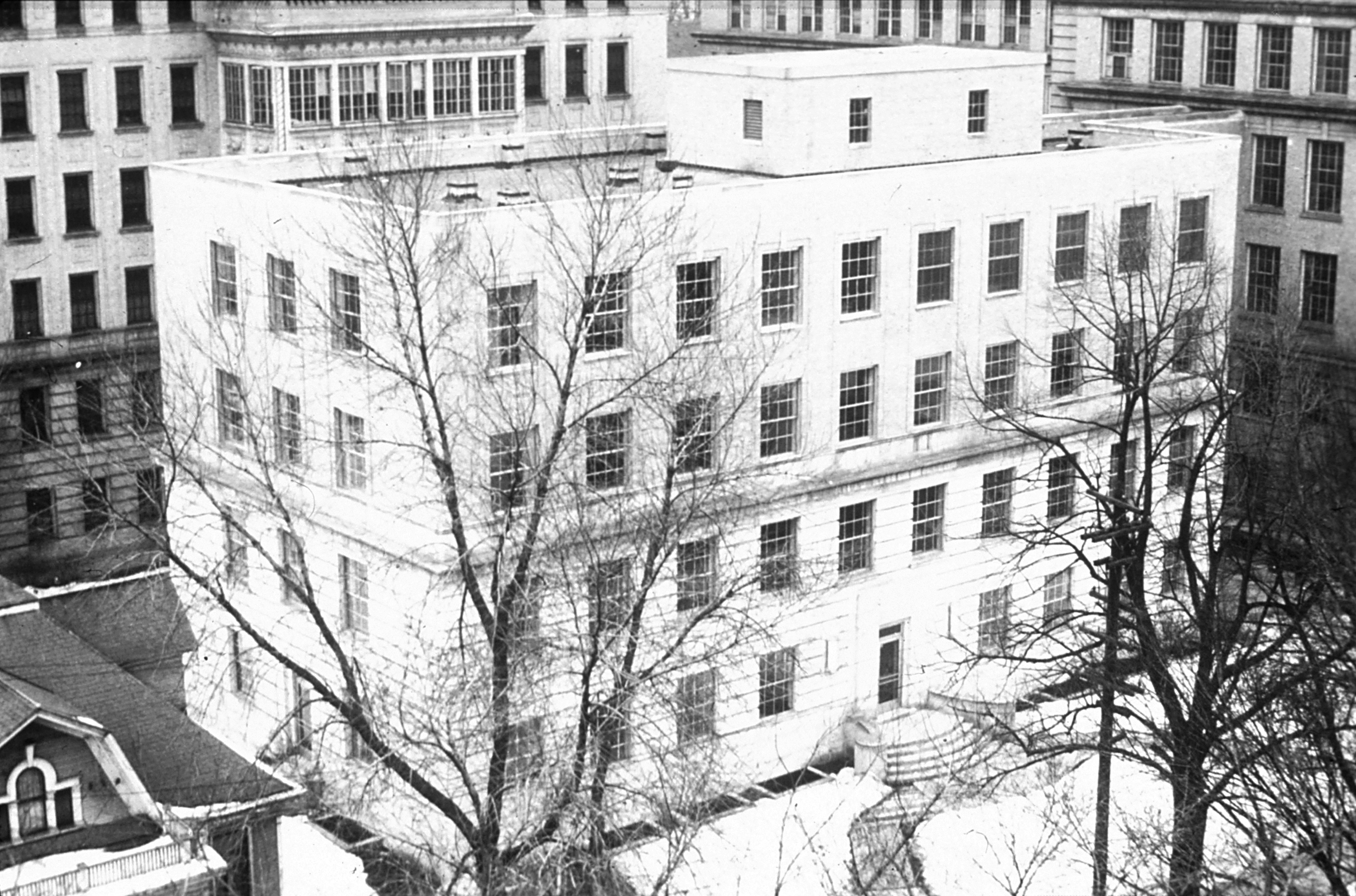
Original McArdle Laboratory

== History ==
The McArdle Laboratory for Cancer Research was established in 1940 as one of the first basic cancer research facilities in the world. The foundation for the development of the Laboratory and the University of Wisconsin's program in experimental cancer research was made possible by the generous donations of private citizens.

In the 1930s, a bequest in the will of Jennie Bowman established the Jonathan Bowman Memorial fund in memory of her father, a prominent state senator. This fund provided the seed money for the initiation of a cancer research program at the University of Wisconsin in Madison. The Bowman funds initially were allocated for fellowships to promising young investigators interested in studying cancer. One of the Bowman Fellows, Harold P. Rusch, became the first Director of the McArdle Laboratory and established the cancer research program at the University of Wisconsin.

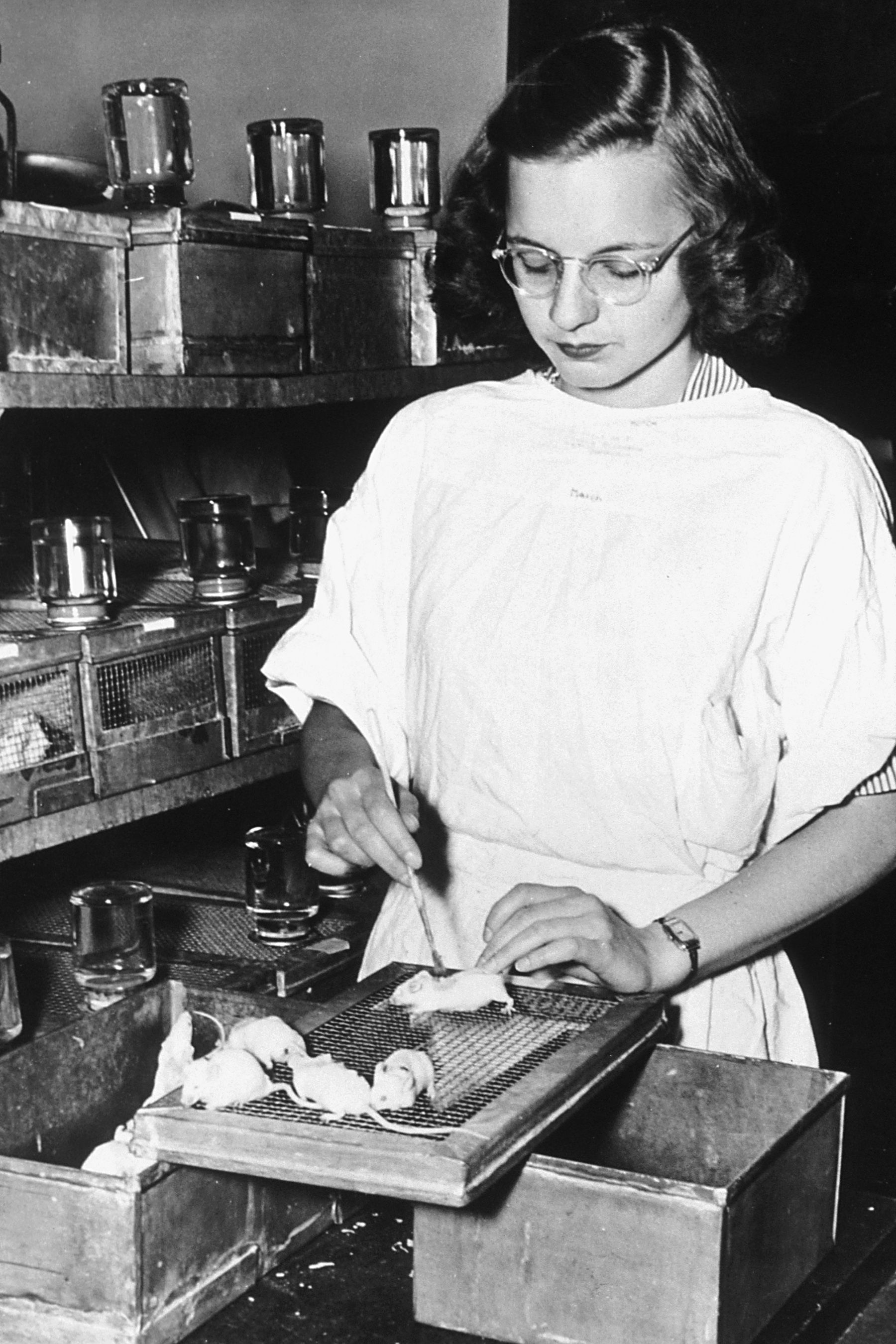
Lab member working with mice

The construction of the first McArdle building resulted from a bequest by Michael W. McArdle, a prominent Chicago industrialist and attorney from Door County, Wisconsin. Expanded facilities, funded by the National Cancer Institute, were provided by the construction in 1964 of the McArdle Laboratory building in the center of the UW-Madison campus. In 2014 most of the labs of the McArdle Laboratory moved into the new state-of-the-art Wisconsin Institutes for Medical Research (WIMR).

Serving as the Director until 1972, Dr. Rusch (with help from Associate Director Dr. Van R. Potter) charted the course for the Laboratory's scientific future by recruiting a staff of talented young scientists, whose creativity and productivity soon earned the McArdle Laboratory an international reputation for excellence in cancer research. From 1972 to 1991, Dr. Henry C. Pitot, a prominent pathologist and oncologist, provided the leadership as the center expanded its program. Dr. Elizabeth C. Miller, who with her husband and scientific partner, Dr. James A. Miller, laid the groundwork for the field of chemical carcinogenesis, also played a key leadership role in the administration of the center, serving as the associate director of the Laboratory from 1973 until her death in 1987. In 1992 Dr. Norman R. Drinkwater assumed the directorship, and Dr. Bill Sugden became the associate director of the McArdle Laboratory. Dr. F. Michael Hoffmann took over as associate director in 2006 and Dr. James D. Shull became the Director in September 2009. The current director of the McArdle Laboratory, Dr. Paul F. Lambert, took over the reins in the fall of 2014.

In its early years, a major focus of McArdle's research program centered on studies of chemical carcinogenesis. McArdle scientists established the basis of the chemical induction of various cancers and discovered how known carcinogens initiate the genetic changes in cells that result in tumor formation. Early studies also focused on the biochemistry of cancer cells and how they differ from normal cells. Gradually the focus of the research program was expanded to other areas of cancer research including the role of viruses in the causation of cancer and, more recently, the roles of oncogenes and developmental processes in cancer.
