= Howard Ronald Kaback =

American biochemist (1936–2019)

H. Ronald Kaback
- Born: June 5, 1936; Philadelphia, Pennsylvania, U.S.
- Died: December 20, 2019 (aged 83); Los Angeles, California, U.S.
- Other name: Ron Kaback
- Occupations: Molecular Biologist, Biochemist
- Years active: 1960–2019
- Spouse: Mollie Kaback
- Awards: Rosenstiel Award (1973); Member of the American Academy of Arts and Sciences (1986); Member of the National Academy of Sciences (1987); Anatrace Membrane Protein Award (2007); Distinguished Alumni Achievement Award (2009); Peter Mitchell Memorial Medal (2012)
- Website: http://149.142.237.181/H.R._Kaback.html

Howard Ronald Kaback (June 5, 1936 – December 20, 2019) was an American biochemist, known for Kabackosomes, the cell-free membrane transport vesicles. He was the brother of Michael M. Kaback, pediatrician and human geneticist, who developed a screening program to detect and prevent Tay–Sachs disease, a rare and fatal genetic disorder most common in Ashkenazi Jews.

== Biography ==
Kaback was born in Philadelphia, Pennsylvania. He earned his BS at Haverford College in 1958 and his MD at The Einstein College of Medicine in 1962. He interned at the Bronx Municipal Hospital Center in Pediatrics and did pre- and postdoctoral research at Einstein College in the laboratory of Adele B. Kostellow. In 1964 he moved to National Heart Institute to the laboratory of Earl R. Stadtman.

In 1970, he joined the Roche Institute of Molecular biology in Nutley, NJ where he later became Head of Biochemistry. In 1989 he became an Investigator of the Howard Hughes Medical Institute and Professor of Physiology and Microbiology, Immunology & Molecular Genetics, as well as a member of the Molecular Biology Institute at the University of California Los Angeles.

Kaback died on December 20, 2019, at the age of 83.

== Career ==
Ronald Kaback became interested in membrane transport at a time when studies on biological membranes were in their infancy, and in the early phase of his career, he developed a cell-free membrane system to study active transport. The system consisted of osmotically sealed membrane vesicles of defined orientation (right-side-out) that catalyze active transport essentially as well as intact cells, but lack subsequent metabolism of the solutes accumulated. These vesicles were dubbed Kabackosomes by the Dutch scientist Wilhelmus N. Konings, Kaback's close friend and early collaborator. In addition to transforming the field of transport from phenomenology to biochemistry, this seminal development caused him to forego the practice of pediatrics for a career in basic science. The use of membrane vesicles from various sources has become a standard tool for testing models and performing hypothesis-driven research.

Kaback demonstrated quantitatively that an electrochemical H^{+} gradient is the immediate driving force for accumulation of many different solutes. Peter Mitchell who conceived and formulated the Chemiosmotic Hypothesis considered these findings to be the most conclusive experimental support for the Hypothesis with respect to membrane transport. Kaback extended his interest to the molecular mechanism of membrane transport by focusing on the lactose permease of Escherichia coli (LacY; aka the lactose/H^{+} symporter), which is now a paradigm for the Major Facilitator Superfamily, arguably the largest group of membrane transport proteins. With the emergence of molecular biology, he and his colleagues pioneered Cysteine-Scanning Mutagenesis in combination with chemical modification, as well as a battery of site-directed biophysical/biochemical techniques to demonstrate almost incontrovertibly that LacY functions by a mechanism involving alternating access of sugar- and proton-binding sites to either side of the membrane. This general experimental approach is recognized today and has become a standard tool for membrane protein research. Without a crystal structure, Kaback and colleagues succeeded in using the approach to obtain essential information about helix packing, the organization of the sugar-binding site, and the residues involved in H^{+} translocation and coupling.

He and his colleagues then obtained an X-ray crystal structure of LacY, an essential step towards understanding the molecular mechanism, which has had important impact on the field of membrane transport. Until his death in 2019, Ronald Kaback gave lectures regularly at international meetings. In the last period of his career, his laboratory continued to extend studies on the evolution and mechanism of LacY and other symport proteins.

== Awards and recognitions ==
- Lewis S. Rosenstiel Award (1973)
- Member of the American Academy of Arts and Sciences (1986)
- Member of the National Academy of Sciences (1987)
- Anatrace Membrane Protein Award (2007)
- Distinguished Alumni Achievement Award (2009)
- Peter Mitchell Memorial Medal (2012)

== Selected publications ==
The results of Kaback's studies are described in over 450 publications in peer-reviewed scientific journals. His research is also chronicled in textbooks, reference books and teaching materials in many languages for both undergraduate and graduate teaching.

- Kaback, H. R. (1968). "The role of the phosphoenolpyruvate-phosphotransferase system in the transport of sugars by isolated membrane preparations of Escherichia coli". J. Biol. Chem. 243 (13): 3711–24. doi:10.1016/S0021-9258(19)34196-1. PMID 4872728.
- Kaback, H. R. (1971). Bacterial membranes. Methods Enzymol. Vol. 22. pp. 99–120. doi:10.1016/0076-6879(71)22015-2. ISBN 978-0-12-181885-2.
- Ramos, S.; Schuldiner, S.; Kaback, H. R. (1976). "The electrochemical gradient of protons and its relationship to active transport in Escherichia coli membrane vesicles". Proc. Natl. Acad. Sci. USA. 73 (6): 1892–1896. Bibcode:1976PNAS...73.1892R. doi:10.1073/pnas.73.6.1892. PMC 430413. PMID 6961.
- Newman, M. J.; Foster, D.; Wilson, T. H.; Kaback, H. R. (1981). "Purification and reconstitution of functional lactose carrier from Escherichia coli". J. Biol. Chem. 256 (22): 11804–11808. doi:10.1016/S0021-9258(19)68477-2. PMID 7028742.
- Foster, D. L.; Boublik, M.; Kaback, H. R. (1983). "Structure of the lac carrier protein of Escherichia coli". J. Biol. Chem. 258 (1): 31–34. doi:10.1016/S0021-9258(18)33213-7. PMID 6336750.
- Frillingos, S; Sahin-Tóth, M; Wu, J; Kaback, HR (October 1998). "Cys-scanning mutagenesis: a novel approach to structure function relationships in polytopic membrane proteins". FASEB J. 12 (13): 1281–99. doi:10.1096/fasebj.12.13.1281. PMID 9761772. S2CID 19339881.
- Abramson, J.; Smirnova, I.; Kasho, V.; Verner, G.; Kaback, H.R.; Iwata, S. (2003). "Structure and Mechanism of the Lactose Permease of Escherichia coli". Science. 301 (5633): 610–615. Bibcode:2003Sci...301..610A. doi:10.1126/science.1088196. PMID 12893935. S2CID 36908983.
- Kaback, H.R.; Dunten, R.; Frillingos, S.; Venkatesan, P.; Kwaw, I.; Zhang, W.; Ermolova, N. (2007). "Site-directed alkylation and the alternating access model for LacY". Proc Natl Acad Sci USA. 104 (2): 491–494. Bibcode:2007PNAS..104..491K. doi:10.1073/pnas.0609968104. PMC 1766412. PMID 17172438.
- Guan, L.; Mirza, O.; Verner, G.; Iwata, S.; Kaback, H.R. (2007). "Structural determination of wild-type lactose permease". Proc Natl Acad Sci USA. 104 (39): 15294–15298. Bibcode:2007PNAS..10415294G. doi:10.1073/pnas.0707688104. PMC 2000551. PMID 17881559.
- Smirnova, I.; Kasho, V.; Choe, J.-Y.; Altenbach, C.; Hubbell, W. L.; Kaback, H.R. (2007). "Sugar binding induces an outward facing conformation of LacY". Proc Natl Acad Sci USA. 104 (42): 16504–16509. Bibcode:2007PNAS..10416504S. doi:10.1073/pnas.0708258104. PMC 2034228. PMID 17925435.
- Smirnova, I.; Kasho, V.; Sugihara, J.; Kaback, HR. (2011). "Opening the periplasmic cavity in lactose permease is the limiting step for sugar binding". PNAS. 108 (37): 15147–15151. Bibcode:2011PNAS..10815147S. doi:10.1073/pnas.1112157108. PMC 3174601. PMID 21896727.
