= Wu Chu-Fang =

Chinese organizer and restaurant owner

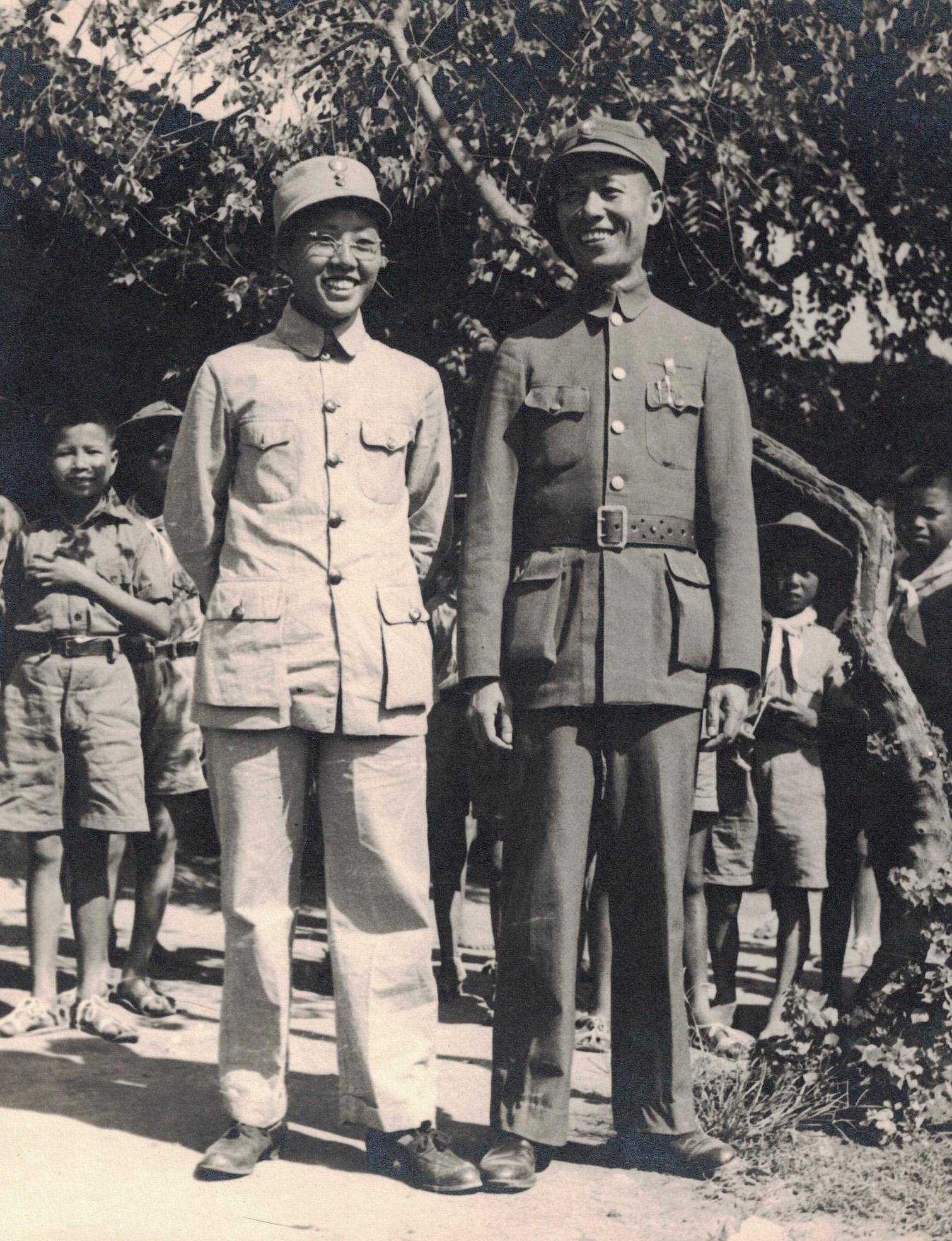
Wu Chu-Fang with husband, General Li Hanhun, visiting refugee children during the Sino-Japanese War, circa 1940.

Wu Chu-Fang (吴菊芳) was known for educating children during the Sino-Japanese war, and running a restaurant in Tarrytown, New York. Her husband, Li Hanhun, was a general in China.

== Early life ==
Chu-Fang was born on September 10, 1911 in China where her father was mayor of Beijing. She graduated from Sun Yat-sen University in 1941; she was the first woman to be a student in the agricultural college.

== Sino-Japanese War ==
During the Sino-Japanese War, she organized literacy and home economics classes for other officers' wives. When her husband, General Li, was recalled to active duty, she worked to raise funds for medical supplies and winter wear for frontline soldiers, Her efforts were recognized in Freda Utley's book China at War, where she was cited for organizing aid for frontline soldiers.

From 1939 until 1945, Chu-Fang directed the rescue of thousands of children from occupied territories and war zones. She established schools and served as the head of Ly Hun Middle School. She also helped women whose husbands had died in the war by providing resources and training.

Chu-Fang was an elected member of the first National Assembly of the Republic of China.

== United States ==
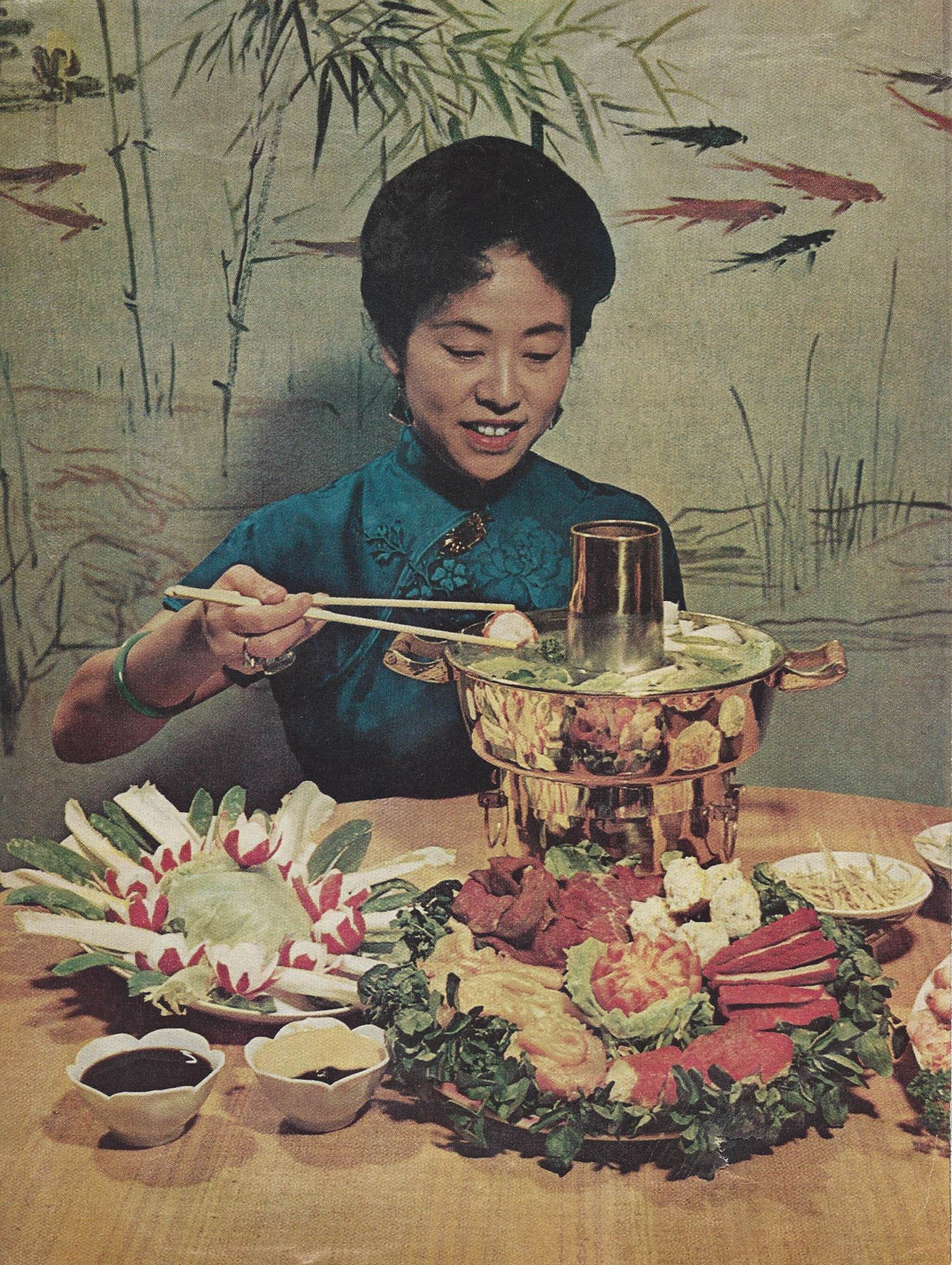
Chu-Fang at her restaurant, China Garden

After the Communist takeover of China in 1949, she moved to New York City with her family. She acquired the skills to operate a restaurant, and in 1955 opened her own restaurant in White Plains NY, the China Garden, It was described in a New York newspaper as "a temple of excellent dining".

In 2012, the couple's joint autobiography, titled Dreams on a Pillow, was published by Guangdong People's Publishing House.

Chu-Fang Wu died on December 10, 1999, in New York City.

== Personal life ==
In 1929 she met Republic of China General Li Hanhun, a commander of the famed Fourth Army, while he was stationed in Yichang, Hubei.
