= Peter K. Vogt =

American geneticist

- Born: March 10, 1932 (age 94); Broumov, Czechoslovakia
- Education: University of Würzburg; University of Tübingen
- Awards: Louisa Gross Horwitz Prize (2019)
- Scientific career
- Workplaces: Scripps Research

Peter K. Vogt (born March 10, 1932) is an American molecular biologist, virologist and geneticist. His research focuses on retroviruses and viral and cellular oncogenes.

== Life ==
Peter K. Vogt was born on March 10, 1932 in Broumov, Czechoslovakia.

== Education and academic appointments ==
Vogt received his undergraduate education in biology at the University of Würzburg and in 1959 was awarded his Ph.D. at the University of Tübingen for work done at the Max Planck Institute for Virology in Tübingen. From 1959 to 1962 he was Damon Runyon Cancer Research Fellow in the laboratory of Harry Rubin at the University of California, Berkeley and started to work on Rous sarcoma virus. He taught microbiology and molecular biology to medical and graduate students at the University of Colorado Denver (1962–1967) and the University of Washington (1967–1971). In 1971, he joined the University of Southern California as Hastings Professor of Microbiology and in 1980 assumed the chairmanship of the Department of Microbiology at the School of Medicine. Since 1993, he has been a professor at Scripps Research. He served as senior vice president for scientific affairs at Scripps from 2012 to 2015.

== Research ==
At the beginning of his scientific career, Vogt studied mechanisms of retroviral cell entry and the role of viral surface proteins in determining host range. He defined related groups of viral surface proteins and their corresponding receptors on the cell surface. During his time in Seattle, his focus shifted to the genetics of retroviruses. Together with his associate Kumao Toyoshima, he isolated the first temperature sensitive mutants of a retrovirus and in collaboration with the biochemist Peter Duesberg discovered the first retroviral oncogene, src. His work on mutants of the Rous sarcoma virus enabled Michael Bishop and Harold Varmus to isolate DNA sequences that represent the src oncogene and to demonstrate the cellular origin of oncogenes. In his extensive studies on avian retroviruses, Vogt discovered oncogenes that play important roles in human cancers, e.g. myc (in collaboration with Bister and Duesberg), jun (with Maki and Bos) and pi3k (with Chang).

== Honors and awards ==
Vogt has received numerous awards, including the Irene Vogeler Prize (1976), the Alexander von Humboldt Award (1984), the Ernst Jung Prize for Medicine (1985), the Robert J. and Claire Pasarow Foundation Medical Research Award (1987), the Paul Ehrlich and Ludwig Darmstaedter Prize (1988), the Bristol-Myers Squibb Award (1989), the Charles S. Mott Prize (1991), the Szent-Györgyi Prize for Progress in Cancer Research (2010), the Pezcoller Foundation-AACR International Award for Cancer Research (2013), the IHV Lifetime Achievement Award for Scientific Contributions (2016), and the AICF Prize for Scientific Excellence in Medicine (2017). In 2019 he was awarded the Louisa Gross Horwitz Prize(Columbia University).

Vogt holds an honorary doctorate from the University of Würzburg (since 1995) and has been elected to several academies, including the National Academy of Sciences USA, the American Philosophical Society, the American Academy of Microbiology, the German National Academy of Sciences Leopoldina, the National Academy of Medicine, the American Academy of Arts and Sciences and the AACR Academy.

== Service ==
Vogt has served on several scientific advisory and editorial boards, e.g. the National Foundation for Cancer Research and the Proceedings of the National Academy of Sciences, USA (2000–2019).

== Painting ==
Vogt is also an avid painter. During his time in Würzburg, he studied with the artist Josef Versl.
