= Frederick Alt =

American geneticist

- Other name: Fred Alt
- Education: Brandeis University; Stanford University
- Children: J. Kenji López-Alt
- Scientific career
- Workplaces: Harvard Medical School; Columbia University; Boston Children's Hospital
- Doctoral advisor: Robert Schimke
- Other academic advisors: David Baltimore
- Doctoral students: Karen M. Frank

Frederick W. Alt is an American geneticist. He is a member of the immunology section of the National Academy of Sciences and a Charles A. Janeway Professor of Pediatrics, and Professor of Genetics at Harvard Medical School. He is the Director of the Program in Cellular and Molecular Medicine at the Boston Children's Hospital. He has been a Howard Hughes Medical Institute investigator since 1987.

== Career ==
Alt completed his undergraduate studies at Brandeis University, graduating in 1971. He then went on to earn a Ph.D. in Biology from Stanford University in 1977 while under the research direction of Robert Schimke. He performed his postdoctoral work in David Baltimore's laboratory at Massachusetts Institute of Technology (MIT). From 1982 to 1991 he was on the faculty at Columbia University and then moved to Harvard Medical School.

Alt's research interest is in maintenance of genome stability in cells of the mammalian immunological system, particularly antigen receptor variable region gene assembly in developing B and T lymphocytes, immunoglobulin heavy chain class switch recombination (CSR), and somatic hypermutation in activated mature B lymphocytes.

== Personal life ==
Alt is the son-in-law of organic chemist Koji Nakanishi, former Centennial Professor of Chemistry and chair of the Chemistry Department at Columbia University.

Alt is also the father of the chef and food writer J. Kenji López-Alt.

== Awards, memberships and honors ==
He has received many awards, this is a select list:

- Clowes Memorial Award from the American Association for Cancer Research
- Rabbi Shai Shacknai Prize from The Hebrew University
- Leukemia & Lymphoma Society de Villiers International Achievement Award
- Irvington Institute Immunology Award
- National Cancer Institute Alfred K. Knudson Award for pioneering contributions that have revolutionized the field of Cancer Genetics
- AAI-Huang Meritorious Career Award, American Association of Immunologists
- Excellence in Mentoring Award, American Association of Immunologists.
- 2004 – Pasarow Foundation Prize for Extraordinary Achievement in Cancer Research
- 2007 – Novartis Prize for Basic Immunology for his discoveries on B cell development and antigen responses
- 2009 – William B. Coley Award for New Discoveries in Immunology from the Cancer Research Institute
- 2014 – 44th annual Lewis S. Rosenstiel Award for Distinguished Work in Basic Medical Research
- 2015 – Szent-Györgyi Prize for Progress in Cancer Research, from the National Foundation for Cancer Research (NFCR)
- 2019 – BioLegend Herzenberg Award, for "exemplary research contributions to the field of B cell biology", American Association of Immunologists.
- 2023 – Paul Ehrlich and Ludwig Darmstaedter Prize

The Cancer Research Institute of New York gives an annual prize in his honor, the Frederick W. Alt Award for New Discoveries in Immunology.

Alt is a member of:

- U.S. National Academy of Sciences
- American Academy of Arts and Sciences
- American Academy of Microbiology
