= Beatrice Mintz =

American biologist (1921–2022)

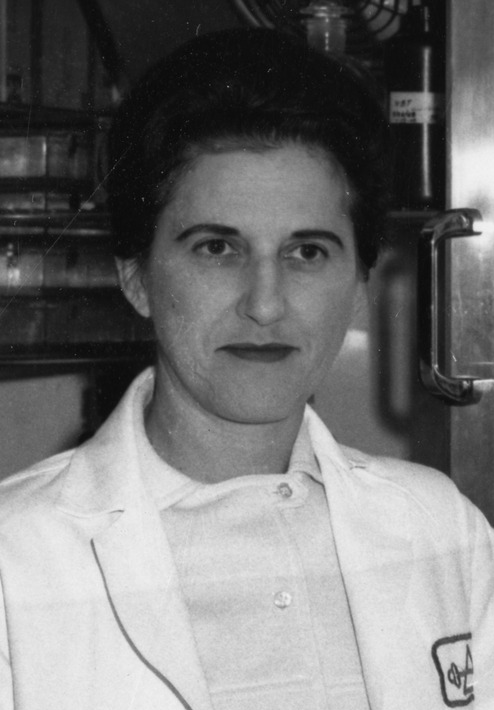
- Born: January 24, 1921; New York City, U.S.
- Died: January 3, 2022 (aged 100); Elkins Park, Pennsylvania, U.S.
- Education: Hunter College and University of Iowa
- Known for: Mammalian transgenesis
- Awards: Rosenstiel Award (1979); Genetics Society of America Medal (1981); Ernst Jung Gold Medal for Medicine (1990); March of Dimes Prize in Developmental Biology (1996); Pearl Meister Greengard Prize (2007); Szent-Györgyi Prize for Progress in Cancer Research (2011)
- Scientific career
- Fields: Embryology, Developmental biology
- Workplaces: University of Chicago; Fox Chase Cancer Center
- Doctoral advisor: Emil Witschi

Beatrice Mintz (January 24, 1921 – January 3, 2022) was an American embryologist who contributed to the understanding of genetic modification, cellular differentiation, and cancer, particularly melanoma. Mintz was a pioneer of genetic engineering techniques and was among the first scientists to generate both chimeric and transgenic mammals.

In 1996, she shared the inaugural March of Dimes Prize in Developmental Biology with Ralph L. Brinster for their work in developing transgenic mice. Much of her career was spent at Fox Chase Cancer Center in Philadelphia where, in 2002, she was appointed to the Jack Schultz Chair in Basic Science. Mintz was a member of both the United States National Academy of Sciences and the Pontifical Academy of Sciences.

== Early life and education ==
Beatrice Mintz was born in New York City on January 24, 1921, to Samuel and Janie Stein Mintz, a Jewish couple from Mikulintsy, then in Austrian Galicia, now in Ukraine. She was graduated magna cum laude from Hunter College in 1941 and then took graduate studies at New York University for a year. Because of anti-Semitic quotas for admission to colleges on the east coast, she attended the University of Iowa, where she received a master's degree in 1944 and her Ph.D. in 1946, studying amphibians under Emil Witschi.

== Research ==
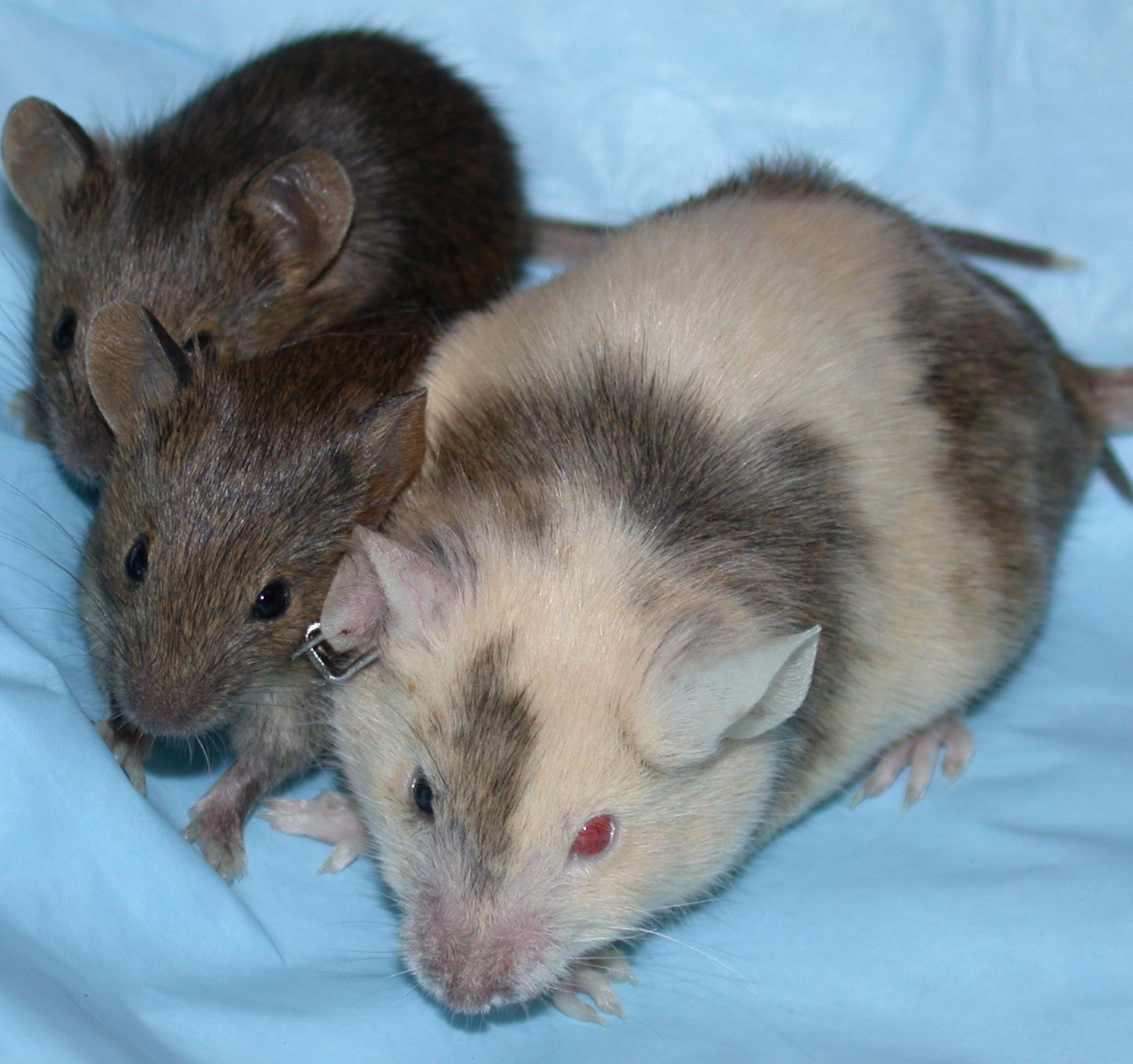
A chimeric mouse (right) and her pups, demonstrating how cells from different donor strains result in a mosaic coat color in the chimera; note her one pink eye

After graduation, Mintz accepted a professorship in biological science at the University of Chicago (1946–60; interrupted by studies abroad: Mintz was awarded a Fulbright research fellowship at the universities of Paris and Strasbourg in 1951). In 1960 she moved to the Institute for Cancer Research of the Lankenau Hospital Research Institute, which became the Fox Chase Cancer Center in 1974, where she remained on faculty. In the mid-1950s, Mintz switched her research focus from amphibians to mammals and became a pioneer in mammalian transgenesis. In 1965, she became an adjunct professor at the University of Pennsylvania.

Mintz and Andrzej K. Tarkowski independently made the first mouse embryonic chimeras in the 1960s by aggregating two embryos at the eight-cell stage. The resultant mice developed normally and their tissues were a mixture of cells derived from the two donor embryos. Mintz went on to create viable chimeric embryos containing blastomeres from up to fifteen different laboratory mice. She developed a technique that involved mixing cells from a black mouse strain into the blastocysts of white or brown mice in vitro. She then surgically transferred these early embryos into surrogate mothers and, after birth, traced the tissue contribution of each cell type made by studying the coat color. Her cell fusion technique was successful where others had failed due to the choice to remove the zona pellucida with pronase treatment, rather than physically. Since 1967 Mintz has created more than 25,000 offspring using this technique.

Mintz demonstrated that teratocarcinoma tumor cells could be reprogrammed to contribute to a healthy mouse when combined with normal mouse embryo cells through eight years of experiments using some of the first pluripotent stem cell cultures ever made.

Mintz and Rudolf Jaenisch published a technological breakthrough in 1974. Jaenisch was a post-doctoral researcher at Princeton University at the time. He was interested in why only certain types of cancer occurred when he injected adult mice with viruses. Inspired by Mintz's earlier work, he wanted to know whether injecting virus into early-stage embryos would result in the DNA being incorporated, and what types of cancer would occur. Mintz agreed to work with Jaenisch, who joined her lab as a visiting fellow for nine months. They showed that DNA from a virus, SV40, could be integrated into the DNA of developing mice and persist into adulthood without apparent tumor formation.

Although only somatic cells were affected, meaning the DNA would not be passed on to future generations, these were the first mice ever made with foreign DNA and this experiment proved healthy genetically modified mammals could be created by viral infection. Using these techniques Mintz was able to establish the genetic basis of certain kinds of cancer and, in 1993, she produced the first mouse model of human melanoma.

== Honors ==
Mintz received numerous awards and honors including the first Genetics Society of America Medal (1981), and the first March of Dimes Prize in Developmental Biology shared with Ralph L. Brinster (1996). She was elected a fellow of the American Academy of Arts and Sciences (1982), American Association for the Advancement of Science (1973), the American Philosophical Society (1982), and won an honorary fellow of the American Gynecological and Obstetrical Society since 1980. She won the Papanicolaou Award for Scientific Achievement (1979), the Amory Prize (1988), the Ernst Jung Gold Medal for Medicine (1990), the John Scott Medal (1994), the American Cancer Society National Medal of Honor for Basic Research (1997), a citation for Outstanding Woman in Science (1993) from the New York Academy of Sciences, and, in 2007, was a recipient of the Pearl Meister Greengard Prize. She received the Quantrell Award.

On March 8, 2011, the U.S. National Foundation for Cancer Research awarded Beatrice Mintz its Sixth Annual Szent-Gyorgyi Prize for Progress in Cancer Research.

In 2012, Mintz was awarded the Ninth Annual AACR Award for Lifetime Achievement in Cancer Research.

She received honorary doctorate degrees from five universities. She delivered dozens of special lectures, including the Ninetieth Anniversary Lecture at the Woods Hole Marine Biological Laboratory (1978) and the first Frontiers in Biomedical Sciences Lecture at the New York Academy of Sciences (1980). She was a member of the National Academy of Sciences, a senior member of the Institute for Cancer Research, Fox Chase Cancer Center in Philadelphia, and served on the editorial boards of various scientific journals.

== Personal life and death ==
Mintz died on January 3, 2022, from heart failure, at age 100. She had dementia in her later years.
