= Sylvie Trottier =

Canadian infectious diseases physician

- Born: May 20, 1952 (age 74); Quebec City, Canada
- Education: Laval University (BSc & MSc) McGill University (MDCM) University of Göteborg (Fellow, Infectious Diseases)
- Known for: Clinical research in infectious diseases, HIV/AIDS and comorbidities, HPV, vaccines, Infection prevention and control in healthcare settings.
- Scientific career
- Fields: Infectious Diseases
- Workplaces: Laval University CHU de Quebec Research Center Quebec Heart and Lung Institute

Sylvie Trottier is a Canadian physician and a medical researcher in the field of infectious diseases, with a focus on HIV/AIDS.

== Career ==
In 1986, Trottier began her career as an infectious disease specialist, just a few years after HIV was first identified, and becomes involved in the care of people living with HIV and in clinical research on HIV and other infectious diseases at the CHU de Québec – Université Laval (CHUL). She also serves as Director of the Clinical Laboratories at Québec Heart and Lung Institute (IUCPQ) and as Director of the Department of Microbiology, Infectious Diseases and Immunology (Département de microbiologie‑infectiologie et immunologie) in the Faculty of Medicine at Université Laval.

In 1995, she was appointed Chief of Clinical Research at the Infectious Disease Research Centre (Centre de recherche en infectiologie, CRI) of Laval University. The same year, she became director of the "Unité hospitalière de recherche, d'enseignement et de soins sur le sida" (UHRESS) at CHUL, a multidisciplinary HIV/AIDS unit providing specialized care, research and teaching for patients from Eastern Quebec.

== Research ==
Trottier has participated as a clinical investigator in national and international clinical trials in HIV, influenza, herpesvirus infections, Clostridioides difficile infection, and other communicable diseases. Her co‑authored work includes randomized trials on influenza antivirals, herpes antivirals and HIV antiretroviral strategies, as well as studies on C. difficile diagnosis and infection control. She contributed to large international HIV studies such as the SMART trial on antiretroviral therapy strategies.

From 2009 to 2015, Trottier contributed to national influenza vaccine research through the PHAC/CIHR Influenza Research Network (PCIRN), serving as an investigator in the Serious Outcomes Surveillance (SOS) Network, which conducted hospital-based surveillance and vaccine effectiveness studies across Canada.

In 2016, she participated in the first clinical study of a Zika virus vaccine in Canada, leading the extensive clinical trial at the Université Laval site in Quebec City under Professor Gary Kobinger's guidance.

During the COVID-19 pandemic, Trottier and collaborators examined SARS‑CoV‑2 infection and immune response in at‑risk essential workers in Quebec, including retail workers. Their work addressed infection rates and risk factors at the onset of the pandemic.

== Awards and honors ==
- 2008 - Farha Foundation Award « Hommage aux Héros » in recognition of 20 years of fighting HIV/AIDS and caring for patients.
- 2018 - Isabel and Michèle Beauchemin-Perreault Prize — Excellence Award from the Health and Social Services Network in the "Safety of Care and Services" category awarded to the IUCPQ infection prevention team.
- 2019 - Laureate of the Council of physicians, dentists and pharmacists (CMDP of IUCPQ) category « Qualité de l'acte » (Best in Patients' Safety).
- 2023 - CHU de Quebec Research Center Awards "Prix Découverte" - Best Collaborative Group.
- 2025 - CHU de Québec Research Center Awards "Prix Recherche-Carrière".

== See also ==
- HIV/AIDS in Canada
- Women in medicine
