= Robert J. and Claire Pasarow Foundation Medical Research Award =

Annual medical research award

The Robert J. And Claire Pasarow Foundation Medical Research Awards were awarded annually for distinguished accomplishment in areas of investigation that included neuropsychiatry, cardiovascular disease, and cancer research. The program ran from 1987 to 2013. Each area of research was allocated US$50,000 to award to its winners.

== History of the award ==
The Pasarow Foundation was created in 1987 by Mr. and Mrs. Pasarow of Beverly Hills, California, to stimulate medical and scientific research. Robert Pasarow was the founder and former president/CEO/chairman of the board of CHB Foods, Inc. The Pasarows established the Claire and Robert J. Pasarow Cancer Laboratory at the Kenneth Norris Jr. Cancer Hospital and Research Institute at the University of Southern California as well as the Pasarow Mass Spectrometry Laboratory at the University of California, Los Angeles. Robert J. Pasarow, now deceased, was the founding president and chairman of the foundation and Claire Pasarow, also deceased, was the chief financial officer.

== Nomination criteria ==
The principal criterion for nomination was evidence of extraordinary accomplishment in medical science.

Nominators provided a one-page letter of intent stating the rationale for the nomination and a copy of the nominee's curriculum vitae and bibliography in two-page NIH format. Applications were reviewed by the board of directors in consultation with various medical scholars.

== Past winners ==
Year	Cancer Award	Cardiovascular Award	Neuropsychiatry Award
1987	Peter K. Vogt, Ph.D. University Of Southern California	Burton E. Sobel M.D., Washington University School of Medicine	Nancy S. Wexler
1988	Irving Weissman, M.D., Stanford University	Harvey Feigenbaum, M.D., Indiana University	Eric Kandel
1989	George F. Vande Woude, Ph.D., National Cancer Institute	Bernardo Nadal-Ginard, M.D., Ph.D., Harvard University	Floyd Bloom
1990	Erkki Ruoslahti, M.D., La Jolla Cancer Research Foundation	Mordecai P. Blaustein, M.D., University of Maryland	Solomon H. Snyder
1991	Harold M. Weintraub, M.D., Ph.D., Fred Hutchinson Research Center	Jonathan G. Seidman, Ph.D. & Christine E. Seidman, M.D., Harvard Medical School	Michael E. Phelps
1992	Ronald M. Evans, Ph.D., Salk Institute for Biological Studies	Glenn A. Langer, M.D., UCLA School of Medicine	Patricia Goldman-Rakic
1993	Stanley J. Korsmeyer, M.D., Washington University in St. Louis	Philip Majerus, M.D., Washington University School of Medicine	Huda Akil and Stanley Watson
1994	Carlo M. Croce, M.D., Jefferson Cancer Center	Jan L. Breslow, M.D., Rockefeller University	Arvid Carlsson, Philip Seeman
1995	Alfred G. Knudson, Jr., M.D., Ph.D., Fox Chase Cancer Center	Kenneth R. Chien, M.D., Ph.D., University of California, San Diego	Stanley Prusiner
1996	Robert A. Weinberg, M.D., Whitehead Institute	Michael Anthony Gimbrone, Jr., M.D., Harvard University	Joseph T. Coyle
1997	Eric S. Lander, DPhil, MIT	Masashi Yanagisawa, M.D., Ph.D., UT Southwestern Medical Center	Eric J. Nestler
1998	Paul L. Modrich, Ph.D., Duke University	Mark T. Keating, M.D., University of Utah	Fred Gage
1999	Anthony Fauci, M.D., National Institutes of Health	Eric N. Olson, Ph.D., UT Southwestern Medical Center	Michael I. Posner and Marcus Raichle
2000	Alexander J. Varshavsky, Ph.D., California Institute of Technology	Richard P. Lifton, M.D., Ph.D., Yale School of Medicine	Pasko Rakic
2001	Tom Maniatis, Ph.D., Harvard University	Robert Lefkowitz, M.D., Duke University Hospital	Seymour Benzer
2002	Roger D. Kornberg, Ph.D., Stanford University	Shaun Coughlin, M.D., Ph.D., University of California, San Francisco	Tomas Hökfelt
2003	Elizabeth Blackburn, Ph.D., University of California, San Francisco	Judah Folkman, M.D. Harvard Medical School and Boston Children's Hospital	Thomas Jessell
2004	Frederick Alt, Ph.D., Harvard Medical School and Children's Hospital	Barry S. Coller, M.D, Rockefeller University	Judith L. Rapoport
2005	Bert W. O'Malley, M.D., Baylor College of Medicine	Douglas C. Wallace, Ph.D., University of California, Irvine	Bruce McEwen
2006	Tony Hunter, Ph.D., Salk Institute for Biological Studies	Daniel Steinberg, M.D., Ph.D., University of California, San Diego	Huda Zoghbi
2007	Bert Vogelstein, M.D., Johns Hopkins University	Richard O. Hynes, Ph.D., Massachusetts Institute of Technology	Aaron T. Beck
2008	Not awarded		
2009	Not awarded		
2010	Inder M. Verma, Ph.D., Salk Institute, Brian J. Druker, M.D., Oregon Health & Science University	David Ginsburg, M.D.,University of Michigan Medical School	Jean-Pierre Changeux
2011	Angela H. Brodie, Lewis C. Cantley, Joan A. Steitz	Jeffrey M. Friedman, Andrew Marks. Gerald Reaven	Robert Malenka, Roger Nicoll, Charles F. Stevens
2012	David M. Livingston, Joan Massagué, Michael G. Rosenfeld	Antonio M. Gotto, Robert W. Mahley, Peter J Ratcliffe FRS, Nuffield Department of Medicine, University of Oxford	Virginia M.-Y. Lee, Ph.D., University of Pennsylvania; Christine Petit, John Q. Trojanowski
2013	Elaine Fuchs, Ph.D., Rockefeller University; Richard Peto, University of Oxford; Matthew P. Scott, Ph.D., Stanford University	Harry C. Dietz, M.D., Johns Hopkins University; Charles T. Esmon, Ph.D., University of Oklahoma; Helen Hobbs, M.D., University of Texas Southwestern	Karl Deisseroth, M.D., Ph.D., Stanford University; Helen S. Mayberg, M.D., Emory University; Carla Shatz, Ph.D., Stanford University

== See also ==
- List of medicine awards
