= Webster Cavenee =

- Born: 1951 (age 74–75)
- Education: Kansas State University, BS 1973; University of Kansas, PhD 1977
- Scientific career
- Institutions: Ludwig Institute for Cancer Research; UC San Diego

Webster K. "Web" Cavenee (born 1951) is the Director of Strategic Alliances in Central Nervous System Cancers at the Ludwig Institute for Cancer Research and Distinguished Professor at the University of California, San Diego. He was the Director of the Ludwig Institute for Cancer Research until 2015 when it was taken over by Richard Kolodner. His laboratory studies gene mutations in cancer, most notably in EGFR and glioblastoma multiforme.

He joined Ludwig in 1985 after doing postdoctoral fellowships at Jackson Laboratory, MIT, and University of Utah. He became the director in 1991.

== Awards ==
- 2014 AACR-Margaret Foti Award for Leadership and Extraordinary Achievements in Cancer Research
- 2013 Elected Fellow of the American Association for Cancer Research Academy
- 2012 Elected to the Leopoldina German Academy of Science
- 2008 Elected Fellow, American Association for the Advancement of Science
- 2007 Elected to the Institute of Medicine
- 2007 AACR-Princess Takamatsu Award
- 2007 Albert Szent-Gyorgyi Prize, National Foundation for Cancer Research
- 2003 Elected Fellow, National Foundation for Cancer Research
- 1998 President, AACR
- 1997 Elected Fellow, American Academy of Microbiology
- 1997 Elected Member of the National Academy of Sciences
- 1994 Farber Prize, American Association of Neurological Surgeons
- 1994-1997 Board of Directors, AACR
- 1990 Charles S. Mott Prize, General Motors Cancer Research Foundation
- 1988 Award for Outstanding Achievement in Cancer Research (Rhoads Prize), AACR
