= Harry Rubin (virologist) =

American virologist (1926–2020)

Harry Rubin (June 23, 1926 – February 2, 2020) was an American cell biologist and virologist. He is known for his experimental research on oncoviruses and how cellular microenvironment and cellular aging affect the regulation of cancerous tumors.

== Biography ==
His parents were Jewish immigrants and his father had a grocery store and delicatessen in Manhattan. Harry Rubin graduated in 1947 as a Doctor of Veterinary Medicine (D.V.M.) from the New York State College of Veterinary Medicine at Cornell University. From 1947 to 1948 he served in the joint U.S.-Mexican Aftosa Commission dealing with an outbreak of hoof-and-mouth disease (fiebre aftosa in Spanish) among cattle in Mexico. From 1948 to 1952 he was stationed in Montgomery, Alabama as a commissioned officer of the United States Public Health Service. In January 1952 he married Dorothy Margaret Shuster, who was being trained as a flight evacuation nurse in the U.S. Air Force when he met her.

In 1952 he was briefly enrolled as a graduate student at New York University, but Wendell Stanley recruited him to work at UC Berkeley's Virus Laboratory. From 1952 to 1953 Rubin was a research fellow at UC Berkeley. From 1953 to 1958 he was a research fellow at Caltech. There he worked in Renato Dulbecco's laboratory and discovered in 1955 that, in a tumor infected with Rous sarcoma virus (RSV), every cell in the tumor is capable of releasing RSV. In 1958 Temin and Rubin published an important paper Characteristics of an assay for Rous sarcoma virus and Rous sarcoma cells in tissue culture on their breakthrough in developing a tissue culture assay for RSV. At UC Berkeley, Rubin was an associate professor from 1958 to 1960 and a full professor from 1960 to 2001, when he retired as professor emeritus.

At UC Berkeley's Virus Laboratory, Rubin, working with postdoctoral fellows, Peter K. Vogt and Hidesaburo Hanafusa, demonstrated that avian sarcoma leukosis virus (ASLV) can act as a "helper virus" for RSV. This research earned Rubin the 1964 Albert Lasker Award for Basic Medical Research (shared with Renato Dulbecco).

Rubin received in 1961 the Eli Lilly Award in Bacteriology and Immunology and in 1963 the Merck Research Award. He was elected in 1978 a member of the United States National Academy of Sciences.

He was "a singer and guitar player much in demand at parties." During the 1960s he was active in Berkeley's anti-Vietnam war movement. In the 1970s he became interested in Jewish ethics and the ideas of some Jewish philosophers such as Emmanuel Levinas, Franz Rosenzweig, Joseph B. Soloveitchik, and Eliezer Berkovits. Rubin and his wife joined the Congregation Beth Israel in Berkeley, and he met regularly with a philosophy discussion group of congregation members.

His doctoral students include Howard M. Temin and Gail R. Martin.

Harry and Dorothy Rubin had two sons and two daughters. He died on February 2, 2020. His grave is in Gan Shalom Cemetery, Contra Costa County, California.

== Selected publications ==
- Rubin, Harry (1955). "Quantitative relations between causative virus and cell in the Rous No. 1 chicken sarcoma". Virology. 1 (5): 445–473. doi:10.1016/0042-6822(55)90037-4. PMID 13274745.
- Temin, Howard M.; Rubin, Harry (1958). "Characteristics of an assay for Rous sarcoma virus and Rous sarcoma cells in tissue culture". Virology. 6 (3): 669–688. doi:10.1016/0042-6822(58)90114-4. PMID 13616179.
- Rubin, H.; Temin, H.M. (1959). "A radiological study of cell-virus interaction in the rous sarcoma". Virology. 7 (1): 75–91. doi:10.1016/0042-6822(59)90178-3. PMID 13636057.
- Rubin, H.; Fanshier, L.; Cornelius, A.; Hughes, W.F. (1962). "Tolerance and immunity in chickens after congenital and contact infection with an avian leukosis virus". Virology. 17: 143–156. doi:10.1016/0042-6822(62)90091-0. PMID 14494904.
- Rubin, H. (1965). "Genetic control of cellular susceptibility to pseudotypes of rous sarcoma virus". Virology. 26 (2): 270–276. doi:10.1016/0042-6822(65)90274-6. PMID 14323995.
- Chow, Ming; Rubin, Harry (1999). "Clonal dynamics of progressive neoplastic transformation". Proceedings of the National Academy of Sciences. 96 (12): 6976–6981. Bibcode:1999PNAS...96.6976C. doi:10.1073/pnas.96.12.6976. PMC 22027. PMID 10359824.
- Rubin, Harry (2003). "Cancer cachexia: Its correlations and causes". Proceedings of the National Academy of Sciences. 100 (9): 5384–5389. Bibcode:2003PNAS..100.5384R. doi:10.1073/pnas.0931260100. PMC 154354. PMID 12702753.
- Rubin, Harry (2008). "Cell–cell contact interactions conditionally determine suppression and selection of the neoplastic phenotype". Proceedings of the National Academy of Sciences. 105 (17): 6215–6221. Bibcode:2008PNAS..105.6215R. doi:10.1073/pnas.0800747105. PMC 2359782. PMID 18434545.
- Rubin, Harry (2011). "The early history of tumor virology: Rous, RIF, and RAV". Proceedings of the National Academy of Sciences. 108 (35): 14389–14396. Bibcode:2011PNAS..10814389R. doi:10.1073/pnas.1108655108. PMC 3167550. PMID 21813762.
- Rubin, Harry (2017). "Dynamics of cell transformation in culture and its significance for tumor development in animals". Proceedings of the National Academy of Sciences. 114 (46): 12237–12242. Bibcode:2017PNAS..11412237R. doi:10.1073/pnas.1715236114. PMC 5699091. PMID 29087347.
