= Karen M. Frank =

American clinical pathologist and microbiologist

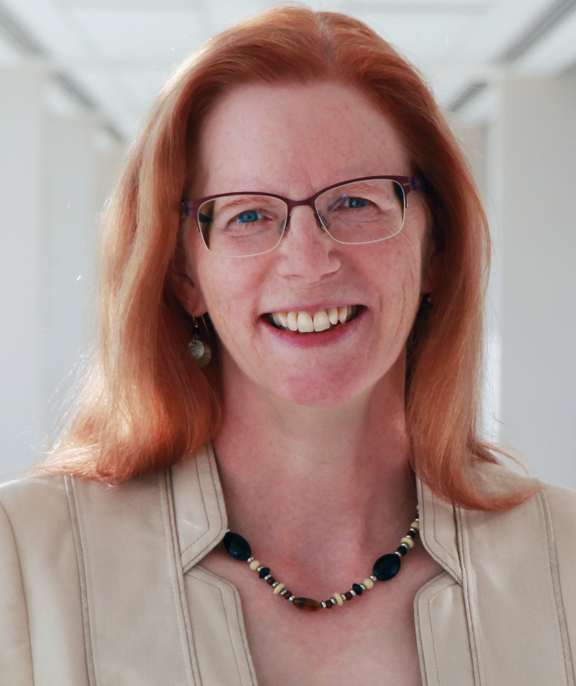
- Education: University of Pennsylvania (MD, PhD)
- Scientific career
- Fields: Clinical pathology, microbiology
- Workplaces: National Institutes of Health Clinical Center
- Doctoral advisor: Frederick Alt

Karen M. Frank is an American clinical pathologist and microbiologist researching the pathogenesis of Staphylococcus aureus pneumonia and resistant gram-negative bacteria. She is a senior clinician, principal investigator, and chief of laboratory medicine at the National Institutes of Health Clinical Center.

== Education ==
Frank completed her M.D. and Ph.D. in biochemistry at the University of Pennsylvania. She completed a clinical pathology residency at the Brigham and Women's Hospital. During her postdoctoral research fellowship in immunology, she focused on V(D)J recombination in developing lymphocytes in the Howard Hughes Medical Institute laboratory of Frederick Alt at the Boston Children's Hospital. As a faculty member, her studies included DNA repair mechanisms relevant to both cancer and immunology, followed by microbiological investigations of Staphylococcus aureus and enterobacteriaceae.

== Career ==
Frank served as director of the lab service center and phlebotomy, and as an associate director of a pathology residency program. She has served as a consultant for medical student education and clinical algorithms for bacterial antibiotic resistance testing in the laboratories of two hospitals in China as part of the Wuhan Medical Education Reform Project. Frank is a board-certified clinical pathologist, with 14 years experience as a clinical microbiologist and seven years of experience as director of clinical microbiology and immunology laboratories. In 2012, Frank joined the department of laboratory medicine at the National Institutes of Health Clinical Center. She is a senior clinician, principal investigator, and chief of laboratory medicine at the Clinical Center. Frank chairs the resident in-service exam committee of the American Society of Clinical Pathology, she is president-elect of the Academy of Clinical Laboratory Physicians and Scientists, and has been the director of an Accreditation Council for Graduate Medical Education-accredited clinical microbiology fellowship.

== Research ==
Frank's laboratory projects include an evaluation of MALDI-TOF identification of microorganisms and molecular methods for microbial identification.

Frank's research collaboration with Juliane Bubeck Wardenburg in the departments of pediatrics and microbiology at the University of Chicago focused on the pathogenesis of Staphylococcus aureus pneumonia. Using microarray analysis of murine lung RNA, we examined the response of the host to a virulent Staphylococcal strain compared to a strain deficient in the alpha-toxin. We determined that the cellular immune response to infection was characterized by a prominent TH17 response to the wild-type pathogen. Investigation of the host-pathogen interaction and the pathogenesis of Staphylococcal lung injury will contribute to programs aimed at the development of novel therapeutic approaches for Staphylococcal disease.

=== Resistant gram negative bacteria ===
Investigators in the National Human Genome Research Institute and the NIH Clinical Center have used advanced DNA sequencing methods to characterize carbapenem-resistant enterobacteriaceae in hospitalized patients. They tracked a cluster of infections in hospitalized patients, then more recently, Frank's laboratory conducted a two-year follow-up study to understand the possible spread of the resistant genes between bacteria on plasmids.

To further investigate the mechanisms used by bacteria to spread resistance, Frank's research program examined the frequency of horizontal gene transfer among species, using bacterial isolates from two hospitals. Most conjugation studies use a lab strain of E. coli, typically under narrow conditions. Given that conjugation is influenced by multiple factors, we sought to perform a systematic analysis of blaKPC encoding plasmids transfer into multiple species. The efficiency of conjugation into enterobacteriaceae patient isolates and a common lab cloning E. coli strain ranged widely from high rates of 10-2 or 10-3 CFU transconjugants/CFU recipients to undetectable, without a clear correlation with the pattern of spread suggested during two hospital outbreaks. In vitro models may not faithfully predict plasmid mobilization until we better understand the most important variables affecting conjugation efficiency.
