= Szent-Györgyi Prize for Progress in Cancer Research =

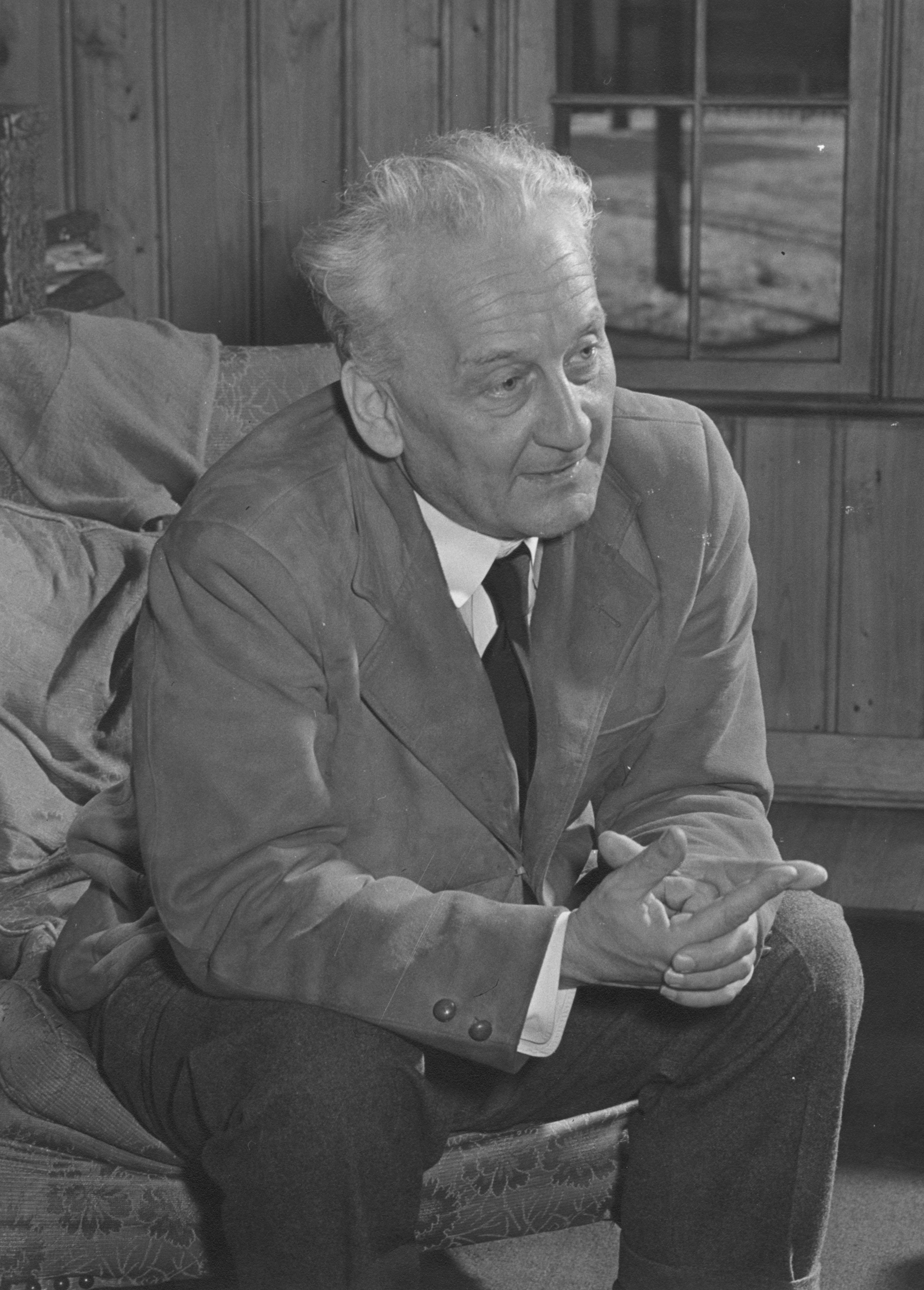
Albert Szent-Györgyi

The Szent-Györgyi Prize for Progress in Cancer Research, established by National Foundation for Cancer Research (NFCR) and named in honor of Albert Szent-Györgyi, Nobel laureate and co-founder of NFCR, has been awarded annually since 2006 to outstanding researchers whose scientific achievements have expanded the understanding of cancer and whose vision has moved cancer research in new directions. The Szent-Györgyi Prize honors researchers whose discoveries have made possible new approaches to preventing, diagnosing and/or treating cancer. The Prize recipient is honored at a formal dinner and award ceremony and receives a $25,000 cash prize. In addition, the recipient leads the next "Szent-Györgyi Prize Committee" as honorary chairman.

The Szent-Györgyi Prize is named in honor of Albert Szent-Györgyi, M.D., Ph.D. was a pioneer who challenged the conventional thinking of the day to pursue his novel ideas. After winning the Nobel Prize for his study on vitamin C and cell respiration, Dr. Szent-Györgyi set his sights on finding a way to defeat cancer. He was a leading advocate for developing resources to provide scientists with the financial support necessary to pursue novel cancer research ideas and in 1973 co-founded NFCR with entrepreneur Franklin C. Salisbury. Since then, NFCR has provided more than $300 million in support of cancer research and prevention education programs.

NFCR established the Szent-Györgyi Prize to honor scientists who have made extraordinary progress in cancer research and to focus attention on the essential role of basic research in finding the answers to the mysteries of cancer. The Prize is also intended to stimulate continued investment in the pioneering research in the hope of producing scientific breakthroughs and lead to a deeper understanding of the scientific concepts behind the genetics and molecular makeup of cancer.

== Szent-Györgyi Prize Recipients ==
Sources: NFCR, NFCR

Year	Recipient	Title/Organization	Notes	Ref(s)
2006	Harold F. Dvorak, M.D.	Mallinckrodt Professor Emeritus of Pathology at Harvard Medical School; Chief of the Department of Pathology at Beth Israel Deaconess Medical Center		
2007	Webster K. Cavenee, Ph.D.	Director of the Ludwig Institute for Cancer Research, San Diego Branch; Distinguished Professor at the University of California, San Diego	Member of the National Academy of Sciences and the Institute of Medicine of the National Academies	
2008	Carlo M. Croce, M.D.	Director of the Human Cancer Genetics Program and Director of the Institute of Genetics at Ohio State University	Member of the National Academy of Sciences and the Institute of Medicine of the National Academies	
2009	Ronald A. DePinho, M.D.	Professor and Director, Belter Institute Department of Medicine and Genetics, Dana-Farber Cancer Institute and Harvard Medical School	Member of the National Academy of Sciences and Institute of Medicine of the National Academies	
2010	Peter K. Vogt, Ph.D.	Professor in the Department of Molecular and Experimental Medicine, The Scripps Research Institute	Member of the American Academy of Arts and Sciences, the National Academy of Sciences, the Institute of Medicine of the National Academies, and the American Academy of Microbiology	
2011	Beatrice Mintz, Ph.D.	Professor and Jack Schultz Chair in Basic Science, Fox Chase Cancer Center.	Member of the National Academy of Sciences and the Pontifical Academy of Sciences	
2012	Zhen-Yi Wang, M.D.	Professor at the School of Medicine of Shanghai Jiao Tong University; Honorary Director of the Shanghai Institute of Haematology	Member of the Chinese Academy of Engineering and the French Academy of Sciences	
2012	Zhu Chen, M.D., Ph.D.	Minister of Health of the People's Republic of China; Professor at the School of Medicine of Shanghai Jiao Tong University	Member of the Chinese Academy of Sciences, the National Academy of Sciences, the Institute of Medicine, the French Academy of Sciences, the Third World Academy of Sciences, and the European Academy of Sciences and Arts	
2013	Alex Matter, M.D.		Awarded for his contributions to the development of the first drug specifically targeting a molecular lesion in cancer	
2014	James P. Allison, Ph.D.	Chairman, Department of Immunology at the University of Texas MD Anderson Cancer Center	Member of the National Academy of Sciences and the Institute of Medicine of the National Academies	
2015	Frederick Alt, Ph.D.	Professor of Genetics at Harvard Medical School; Director of the Program in Cellular and Molecular Medicine at Boston Children’s Hospital	Howard Hughes Medical Institute Investigator	
2016	Mary-Claire King, Ph.D.	Professor of Medicine (Medical Genetics) and Genome Sciences at University of Washington		
2017	Michael N. Hall, Ph.D.	Professor of Biochemistry at Biozentrum University of Basel		
2018	Douglas R. Lowy	Center for Cancer Research at the National Cancer Institute		
2018	John T. Schiller	Center for Cancer Research at the National Cancer Institute		
2019	Steven Rosenberg, M.D., Ph.D.	Chief of the National Cancer Institute Center for Cancer Research’s surgery branch in Bethesda		
2020	Susan Band Horwitz, Ph.D.	Professor and Rose C. Falkenstein Chair in Cancer Research at the Albert Einstein College of Medicine		
2021	Mark M. Davis, Ph.D.	Professor of microbiology and immunology at the Stanford University		
2021	Tak Wah Mak, Ph.D.	Senior scientist at the Princess Margaret Cancer Centre; University professor at the University of Toronto		
2022	Rakesh K. Jain, Ph.D.	Professor of Tumor Biology at Massachusetts General Hospital in the Harvard Medical School		
2023	Isaac Witz, Ph.D.	Professor of immunology and cancer research at Tel Aviv University		
2024	Dennis Slamon	Oncologist and chief of the division of Hematology-Oncology at UCLA		

== See also ==
- List of medicine awards
