= Derrick Rossi =

Canadian stem cell biologist

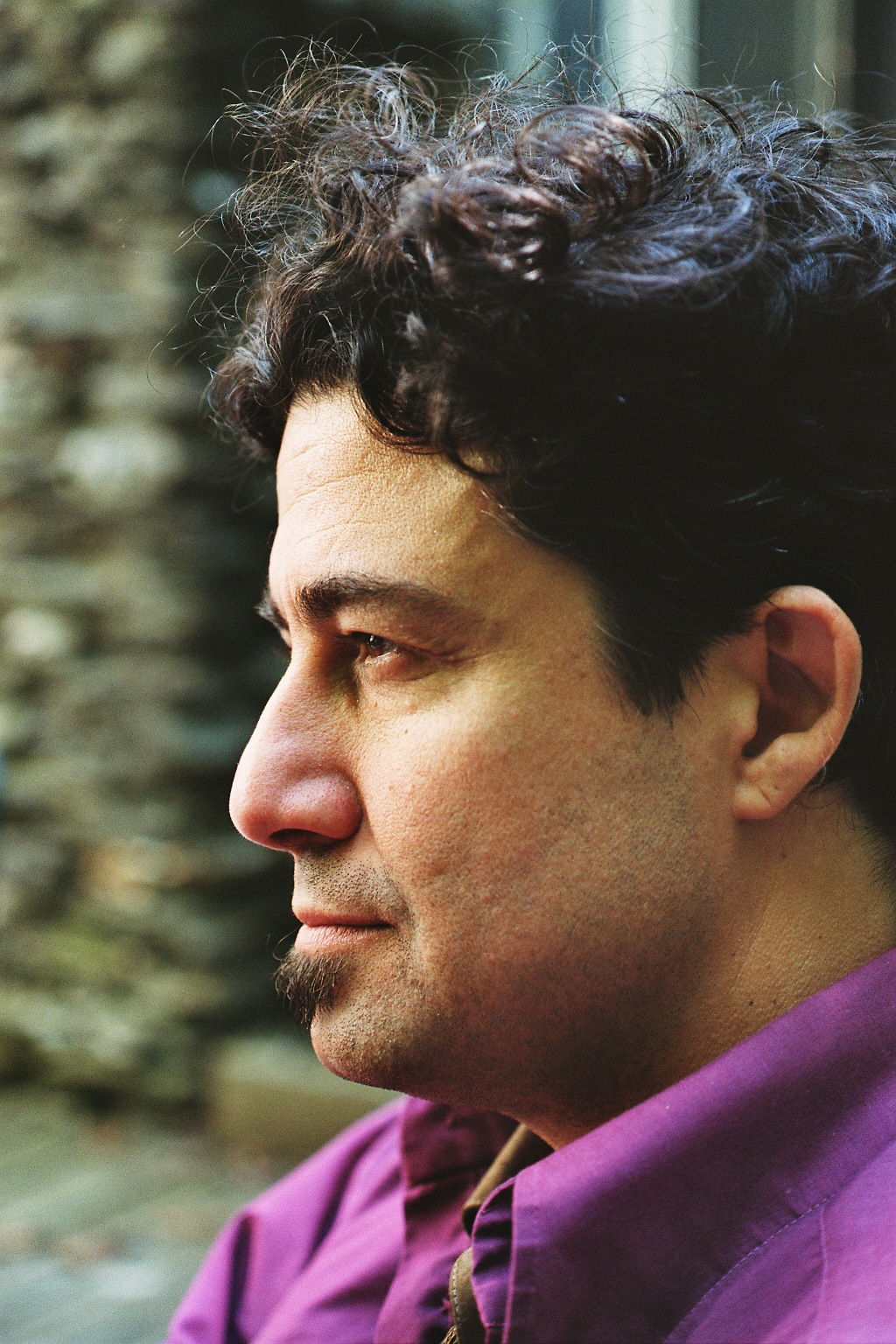
Derrick Rossi, 2008

Derrick J. Rossi (born 5 February 1966), is a Canadian stem cell biologist and entrepreneur. He is a co-founder of the pharmaceutical company Moderna.

== Early life and education ==
Rossi was born in Toronto as the youngest of five children of a Maltese immigrant family. His father Fred worked in auto body shops for 50 years and his mother Agnes co-owned a Maltese bakery.

Rossi attended the Dr. Norman Bethune High School in Scarborough where he early discovered his passion for molecular biology. He then did his undergraduate and master's degrees in molecular genetics at the University of Toronto. He earned his Ph.D. from the University of Helsinki in 2003 and held a post-doc position from 2003 to 2007 at Stanford University in Irving Weissman’s lab.

== Career ==
Rossi in 2007 was appointed Associate Professor at the Stem Cell and Regenerative Biology Department at Harvard Medical School and Harvard University. At the same time he was a principal faculty member of the Harvard Stem Cell Institute and an investigator at the Immune Disease Institute (IDI), as well as in the Program in Cellular and Molecular Medicine at the Children’s Hospital Boston.

Moderna was founded in 2010, based on discovery that pluripotent stem cells can be transformed and reprogrammed. Time magazine cited this pluripotent discovery as one of the top ten medical breakthroughs of the year.

In 2013 Rossi, Chien and their team reported that they "were able to improve heart function in mice and enhance their long-term survival with a "redirection of their [stem cell] differentiation toward cardiovascular cell types" in a significant step towards regenerative therapeutics for Moderna. In the same year and on the strength of the same paper Moderna was able to partner with AstraZeneca in exchange for $240 million "in upfront cash (plus much more in potential milestone payments)", and then received from other investors $110 million.

In 2014 Rossi retired from his functions at the board and as a scientific advisor at Moderna.

In 2015 Rossi was scientific co-founder of Intellia Therapeutics. In 2016 Rossi co-founded Magenta Therapeutics. Rossi was involved in the foundation of Stelexis Therapeutics in 2017, which develops new medication for treating cancerous stem cells.

In 2018 Rossi retired from all of his Harvard positions in order to focus on his activities as an entrepreneur. Rossi served as the interim CEO of the New York Stem Cell Foundation from October 2022 to January 2024. Rossi is also CEO of Convelo Therapeutics.

== Scientific contributions ==
Rossi develops and promotes new therapies using biotechnological methods thus contributing to novel approaches in regenerative medicine. His research focussed on different aspects of stem cell biology. In order to avoid ethical issues related to the use and exploitation of human stem cells, Rossi based his developments on the results of Katalin Karikó and Drew Weissman on mRNA. He succeeded in finding investors for his plans to transfer these findings into new medications and vaccinations by founding Moderna.

Rossi is on record as writing of his synthetic modified mRNA: "because our technology is RNA based, it completely eliminates the risk of genomic integration and insertional mutagenesis inherent to all DNA-based methodologies."

== Awards and honours ==
In 2021 he was awarded the Princess of Asturias Award in the category "Scientific Research".

=== Selected papers ===
- Derrick J Rossi; David Bryder; Jun Seita; Andre Nussenzweig; Jan Hoeijmakers; Irving L Weissman (1 June 2007). "Deficiencies in DNA damage repair limit the function of haematopoietic stem cells with age". Nature. 447 (7145): 725–729. doi:10.1038/NATURE05862. ISSN 1476-4687. PMID 17554309. Wikidata Q28505636.
- Luigi Warren; Philip D Manos; Tim Ahfeldt; et al. (30 September 2010). "Highly efficient reprogramming to pluripotency and directed differentiation of human cells with synthetic modified mRNA". Cell Stem Cell. 7 (5): 618–630. doi:10.1016/J.STEM.2010.08.012. ISSN 1934-5909. PMC 3656821. PMID 20888316. Wikidata Q28131663.
- Athurva Gore; Zhe Li; Ho-Lim Fung; et al. (1 March 2011). "Somatic coding mutations in human induced pluripotent stem cells". Nature. 471 (7336): 63–67. doi:10.1038/NATURE09805. ISSN 1476-4687. PMC 3074107. PMID 21368825. Wikidata Q29616798.

== Family life ==
Rossi is married to Finnish biologist Nina Korsisaari and father of three daughters.
