= Kenneth R. Chien =

American doctor and medical scientist (born 1951)

Kenneth Randall Chien
- Education: Harvard College; Temple University
- Known for: Research in the field of cardiovascular biotechnology and regenerative cardiovascular medicine; Co-founding Moderna
- Parent: Luther Chien (father)
- Awards: Pasarow Award (1996)
- Scientific career
- Fields: Cardiovascular research; Regenerative cardiovascular medicine; Stem cell research; Biotechnology
- Workplaces: Harvard University; Temple University; UC San Diego-Salk Institute; Massachusetts General Hospital; Karolinska Institute (Swedish: Karolinska Institutet)

Kenneth R. Chien (born 1951) is an American doctor and medical scientist who has been a research director at the Karolinska Institute in Stockholm since 2013. Chien has several papers with over 1,000 citations and an H-index of 132. His area of expertise is in cardiovascular science. His research into regenerative cardiovascular medicine, specifically while acting as director of the Cardiovascular Program of the Harvard Stem Cell Institute, led to his co-founding of ModeRNA Therapeutics in 2010. In 2018, the company re-branded as Moderna, Inc. Chien is a recipient of the Walter Bradford Cannon Award of the American Physiology Society and the Pasarow Award. He is a member of the Norwegian Academy of Science and Letters, the Austrian Academy of Sciences, and has received an honorary doctorate from the University of Edinburgh.

== Education ==
Kenneth's father Luther was born in China and escaped the second world war. He became a Harvard and MIT scholar, and DuPont scientist while working for the navy. Luther wanted Kenneth to become a neurologist. Kenneth Chien earned a BA from Harvard College in Biology before earning his PhD and MD from Pennsylvania's Temple University. He continued to study internal medicine and cardiology at the University of Texas Southwestern Medical Center in Dallas. At Temple, Chien's PhD thesis was entitled "Biochemical events in irreversible, ischemic liver cell injury", which was published in 1982 and for which he conducted his dissertation in 1983. He is also a third generation Harvard alumnus, following his father and grandfather.

== Career and research ==
Chien became a member of the faculty at the University of California at San Diego, acting as director of the Institute for Molecular Medicine from 2000 to 2005, with an adjunct appointment as a Professor of the Salk Institute. During that period, Chien was also responsible for co-founding the Institute of Molecular Medicine at Beijing's Peking University. Chien then worked as Scientific Director of the Cardiovascular Research Center at Massachusetts General Hospital from 2005 to 2012, concurrent to directing the Cardiovascular Program of the Harvard Stem Cell Institute from 2007 to 2013. In 2013 Chien took up a position as Professor of Cardiovascular Research and Research Director or the Wallenberg-Cardiovascular Initiative at Karolinska Institute in Stockholm, Sweden. In an interview, Chien discussed the opportunity at KI to work closely with Astrazeneca in Molndal to move forward discoveries in regenerative therapeutics made in his lab towards clinical application, as well as praising Sweden as “a country that has decided to put its faith in science and technology". Dr. Chien has received numerous grants from the National Heart, Lung, And Blood Institute, dating back to 1985. He has also applied for several patents, securing a total of 17.

=== Moderna involvement ===
While working at Harvard, Chien was approached by Derrick Rossi, a colleague at the Harvard Stem Cell Institute, about co-founding a new company, based on the findings of the Rossi lab on reprogramming stem cells with mRNA. This idea eventually formed the medical research company Moderna Therapeutics, co-founded by Rossi, Chien and Bob Langer under the aegis of Flagship VentureLabs in 2011. In 2011, the Chien Lab made the discovery of the high efficiency expression of VEGF mRNA in heart muscle, resulting in a patent on the discovery that triggered mRNA towards therapeutic applications. In 2013, Chien and his associates documented the ability of VEGF mRNA for coronary vascular regeneration and to reverse the onset of heart dysfunction, thereby opening the potential of were researching the possibility of using synthetic messenger RNA (mRNA) to produce therapeutic desired effects in a patient's muscle cells:

“What we have shown is that muscle cells take up this synthetic mRNA and will express almost any protein quickly. The technology will allow an intense, focused, one‐time application to drive a therapeutic effect that might have a long‐lasting effect by affecting, expanding and redirecting the fate of rare native tissue progenitors that are normally mobilized during injury and usually contribute to scar tissue.” At Karolinska, the Chien lab documented the ability to generate large numbers of human islet heart progenitor cells from human embryonic stem cells, which resulted in a partnership with Astrazeneca to move the project toward clinical application.

In February 2019, AstraZeneca and the Chien lab reported the first in human study of an mRNA therapeutic, noting reversal of vascular dysfunction in diabetic patients by VEGF mRNA.

== Awards and honors ==
- American Physiological Society - Walter B. Cannon Award - Annual Award For Outstanding Investigator in Physiological Sciences
- Robert J. and Claire Pasarow Foundation - Pasarow Foundation Award
- Austrian Academy of Sciences - Foreign Member Elect
- Norwegian Academy of Sciences - Foreign Member Elect
- University of Edinburgh - Honorary Doctorate of Science
- UCSD School of Medicine - American Heart Association Chair in Cardiovascular Research
- Harvard University - Sanders Endowed Chair in Medicine and Cell Biology
- Swedish Research Council - Distinguished Professorship
- European Research Council (ERC) - Advanced Research Grant Award
- Knut and Alice Wallenberg - Research Grant Award

== Selected publications ==
- "PPARγ is required for placental, cardiac, and adipose tissue development", Y Barak, MC Nelson, ES Ong, YZ Jones, P Ruiz-Lozano, KR Chien, ..., Molecular cell 4 (4), 585–595, (1999)
- "Postnatal isl1+ cardioblasts enter fully differentiated cardiomyocyte lineages", KL Laugwitz, A Moretti, J Lam, P Gruber, Y Chen, S Woodard, LZ Lin, ..., Nature 433 (7026), 647–653, (2005)
- "Signaling pathways for cardiac hypertrophy and failure", JJ Hunter, KR Chien, New England Journal of Medicine 341 (17), 1276–1283, (1999)
- "Multipotent embryonic isl1+ progenitor cells lead to cardiac, smooth muscle, and endothelial cell diversification", A Moretti, L Caron, A Nakano, JT Lam, A Bernshausen, Y Chen, Y Qyang, ..., Cell 127 (6), 1151–1165, (2006)
- "Cardiac muscle cell hypertrophy and apoptosis induced by distinct members of the p38 mitogen-activated protein kinase family", Y Wang, S Huang, VP Sah, J Ross, JH Brown, J Han, KR Chien, Journal of Biological Chemistry 273 (4), 2161–2168, (1998)
- "Epicardial progenitors contribute to the cardiomyocyte lineage in the developing heart", B Zhou, Q Ma, S Rajagopal, SM Wu, I Domian, J Rivera-Feliciano, ..., Nature 454 (7200), 109–113, (2008)
- "Regulation of cardiac gene expression during myocardial growth and hypertrophy: molecular studies of an adaptive physiologic response", KR Chien, KU Knowlton, S Chien, The FASEB Journal 5 (15), 3037–3064, (1991)
- "ErbB2 is essential in the prevention of dilated cardiomyopathy SA Crone", YY Zhao, L Fan, Y Gu, S Minamisawa, Y Liu, KL Peterson, ..., Nature medicine 8 (5), 459–465, (2002)
- "MLP-deficient mice exhibit a disruption of cardiac cytoarchitectural organization, dilated cardiomyopathy, and heart failure", S Arber, JJ Hunter, J Ross Jr, M Hongo, G Sansig, J Borg, JC Perriard, ..., Cell 88 (3), 393-403 (1997)
- "Enhanced myocardial function in transgenic mice overexpressing the beta 2-adrenergic receptor", CA Milano, LF Allen, HA Rockman, PC Dolber, TR McMinn, KR Chien, ..., Science 264 (5158), 582–586, (1994)
