= Stéphane Bancel =

French businessman (born 1972)

- Bancel in 2026
- Born: 1972 (age 53–54); Marseille, France
- Education: CentraleSupélec (BS); University of Minnesota (MS); Harvard University (MBA)
- Spouse: Brenda Bancel
- Children: 2

Stéphane Bancel (born 1972) is a French billionaire businessman. He is the chief executive officer (CEO) of the American pharmaceutical and biotechnology company Moderna, known for its COVID-19 vaccine. Before joining Moderna, Bancel was the CEO of French diagnostics company BioMérieux. Bancel is a partner at Flagship Pioneering, and has been on the boards of Indigo Agriculture, Boston's Museum of Science, and Qiagen. As of May 2023, his net worth was estimated at US$4.1 billion, owning about 8% of Moderna.

== Early life ==
Bancel was born in Marseille, France. His father and mother were an engineer and doctor, respectively. They divorced when he was eight. He enjoyed computers, math, and science during his childhood.

Bancel studied engineering at CentraleSupélec (former École Centrale Paris) and biological engineering at the University of Minnesota, earning master's degrees at both institutions. He went on to earn an MBA from Harvard Business School.

== Career ==
Bancel was a sales director at Eli Lilly and Company, eventually becoming head of operations for Belgium. In 2007, he became CEO of French diagnostics company BioMérieux, and was credited with improving the company's margins.

In 2011, Bancel joined Moderna as the CEO. Stat reported that Bancel led a highly secretive culture with little outside review of its science or research.

== Personal life ==
He is married to Brenda Bancel. They have two children. In April 2020, with the Moderna share price rising on news of imminent phase 2 human trials for its potential COVID-19 vaccine, Bancel's stake of about 9% became worth over $1 billion. He lives in Boston, Massachusetts.
