= Isaac Witz =

Israeli immunologist and cancer researcher (1934–2026)

Isaac P. Witz
- יִצְחָק וִיץ
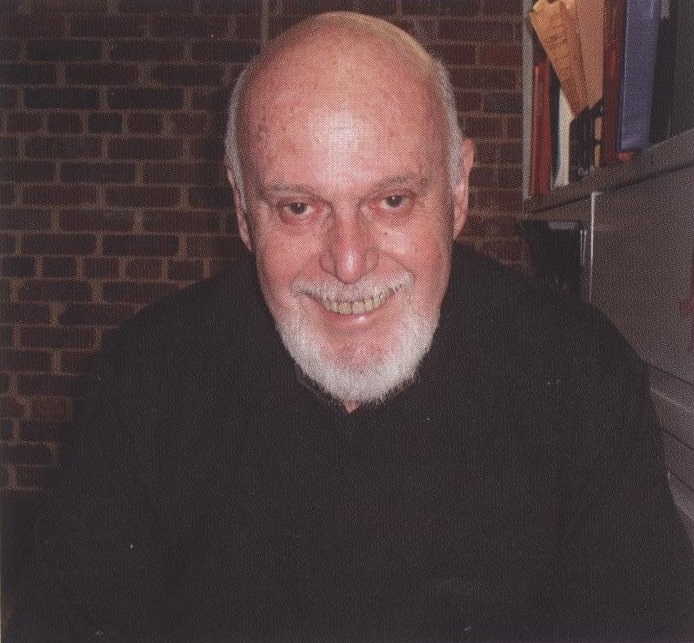
- Born: November 7, 1934; Vienna, Austria
- Died: January 12, 2026 (aged 91)
- Education: Hebrew University of Jerusalem (MSc, 1959); Hebrew University of Jerusalem (PhD, 1965)
- Occupations: Immunologist, cancer researcher
- Employer: Tel Aviv University
- Notable work: Pioneering contributions in the research field of tumor microenvironment (TME)

Isaac P. Witz (Hebrew: יִצְחָק וִיץ; November 7, 1934 – January 12, 2026) was an Israeli immunologist and cancer researcher, who was professor Emeritus at the Shmunis School of Biomedicine and Cancer Research at Tel Aviv University (TAU), where he was once the vice president for Research and Development and the Dean of Faculty of Life Sciences. He was one of the scientists who laid the foundations of the tumor microenvironment (TME) research field.

== Background ==
Witz was born in Vienna on November 7, 1934. In September 1939 he immigrated with his parents to Mandatory Palestine which was administered by a British-held mandate. In 1952, Witz joined the Israel Defense Forces, where he served as an officer in the armored forces. He did his reserve service in the medical corps.

Soon after his discharge, he initiated his Masters studies in Microbiology, Biochemistry and Parasitology which he completed in 1959. He then started his Doctoral studies in various aspects of Cancer Immunology at the Hebrew University of Jerusalem – Hadassah Medical School.

In 1965, upon completion of his PhD studies, Witz moved to the United States, for post-doctoral training at Roswell Park Memorial Institute, Buffalo, New York under the guidance of the world-renowned Immunochemist David Pressman.

In 1968 he returned to Israel and was appointed lecturer of Immunology at TAU where he established his research laboratory. In 1972 he was promoted to Associate Professor and elected to chair the Department of Microbiology, leading the transition of the Department of Microbiology from its temporary residence at Abu Kabir to the Ramat Aviv campus. In 1975, he was promoted to full Professorship.

In 1979, Witz was elected as Dean of the George S. Wise Faculty of Life Sciences. In 1980 he founded the Cancer Biology Research Center of TAU, being its first head. He served in these academic/administrative positions until 1984, when he was elected as the Vice President for Research and Development of TAU and as the chair of Ramot, the technology transfer company of TAU. He held these positions until 1987.

Witz served in several public positions in Israel as well as in international forums. In Israel, he served as the President of the Immunological Society (1986–1989) and as the Founding President of the Israeli Society for Cancer Research (2008–2011). He was also a member of International Committees on scientific cooperation between Israel and Germany, and Israel and France.

Witz retired from teaching and from administrative positions in 2003 but kept heading an active research group.

Witz was a father of two, grandfather of five and great-grandfather of two. He died on January 12, 2026, at the age of 91.

== Research ==
Isaac Witz was a veteran cancer researcher at Tel Aviv University. He authored over 230 papers in leading academic journals, edited 11 books, and wrote many book sections. He was a member of several scientific societies and associations in immunology and cancer research and served as a visiting professor in American and Austrian institutes, as well as at the Karolinska Institute in Stockholm. He was the editor of several journals in cancer research.

In his very beginning as a principal investigator, he headed a team that tried to understand why cancer patients' bodies do not reject their tumors. He then pioneered the research field of the Tumor Microenvironment (TME) being the Founding-President of the International Cancer Microenvironment Society. He organized and presided over seven international conferences focusing on TME: Sea of Galilee (1995), Vienna (2002), Prague (2004), Florence (2007), Versailles (2009), Suzhou (2012), and Tel Aviv (2015).

Witz's scientific career of over fifty years of focusing on the cancer ecosystem was pioneered in the late 1960s and early 1970s by the groundbreaking discovery that humoral immune components (antibodies) localized in the microenvironment of cancer cells and coated these cells. These antibodies affect cancer growth and progression to metastasis by a variety of molecular pathways. These studies coupled with similar findings that cells of the immune system penetrate the microenvironment of solid tumors and interact with cancer cells, formed the basis for the Tumor Immune Microenvironment (TIM) research field. Ways to modify and normalize TIM led to the development of contemporary life-saving immunotherapy modalities.

Aiming to explore the pathobiology of the multifaceted cellular and molecular interactions occurring in the TME, Witz, in the 1980s shifted his attention to the entire spectrum of cells and molecules in the TME. He provided the first conclusive in-vivo evidence that cancer variants originating from a common clonal ancestor and having an identical load of oncogenes, manifested a diverse malignant phenotype depending on their microenvironment.

In the view of the complexity of the interactions of cancer cells with other components of the TME, Witz advocates conceptual changes in the way of analyzing the cancer ecosystem, away from reductionism to a more holistic approach.

As of 2023, aiming to develop novel therapeutic methods Witz's laboratory investigates the cellular and molecular mechanisms behind the progression of disseminating cancer cells to metastasis, the most lethal manifestation of cancer. He studies the bilateral interactions between cancer cells and other cells in the TME being reflected by reprogramming of gene expression of each interaction partner.

These cellular cross talks play a pivotal role in the "junction of decision": cancer progression; cancer regression or cancer dormancy.

== Awards ==
- 1960: Gurevitch Award, Hebrew University, Jerusalem, Israel
- 1961: Anne Frank Fellowship to enable research in Villejuif, France
- 1974: Eleanor Roosevelt International Cancer Scholarship
- 1980–2003: The David Furman Chair of Cancer Immunobiology
- 1990: Fogarty Scholar in Residence, NIH, Bethesda, Md., USA
- 1996: Elected Member of the World Academy of Art and Science
- 2003: The Jacqueline Seroussi Award for Cancer Research (with Judah Folkman)
- 2008: Life Time Achievement Award for Scientific Contributions, University of Maryland
- 2014: The Otto Hertz Memorial Lecture and a symposium in honor of his 80th birthday Tel Aviv University
- 2018: Doctor Honoris Causa – University of Vienna, Austria
- 2019: 14th Annual Marlene and Stewart Greenebaum Lecture, Institute of Human Virology, University of Maryland
- 2022: Honorary Member – The European Academy of Tumor Immunology
- 2022: Lifetime Achievement Award – Israeli Society for Cancer Research
- 2023: Career Achievement Award in Cancer Research – The Shmunis School of Biomedicine and Cancer Research, Tel Aviv University
- 2023: Szent-Györgyi Prize for Progress in Cancer Research
- 2024: Adjunct Professor at the Medical University of Vienna

== Selected papers ==
- Witz IP and Izraely S. Introduction to the Tumor Microenvironment. In: Biomaterials Science Series No. 14; Biomaterial Based Approaches to Study the Tumour Microenvironment. Jessica O. Winter JO, Rao SS Editors. Royal Society of Chemistry. 11–29, 2023.
- Witz IP and Izraely S. The microenvironment of Site-specific Metastasis. In: Cancer Metastasis Through the Lymphovascular System. Leong SP, Nathanson D, Zager JS Editors. Springer Nature Switzerland, 107–115, 2022.
- Witz IP. The cross talk between cancer cells and their microenvironments. Biochem Biophys Res Commun. 633:59–60, 2022.
- Leong SP, Witz IP, Sagi-Assif O, Izraely S, Sleeman J, Piening B, Fox BA, Bifulco CB, Martini R, Newman L, Davis M, Sanders LM, Haussler D, Vaske OM, Witte M. Cancer microenvironment and genomics: evolution in process. Clin Exp Metastasis. 39:85–99, 2022.
- De Las Rivas J, Brozovic A, Izraely S, Casas-Pais A, Witz IP, Figueroa A. Cancer drug resistance induced by EMT: novel therapeutic strategies. Arch Toxicol. 95:2279–2297, 2021.
- Izraely S, Witz IP. Site-specific metastasis: A cooperation between cancer cells and the metastatic microenvironment. Int J Cancer.148:1308–1322, 2021.
- Maman S, Witz IP. A history of exploring cancer in context. Nat Rev Cancer. 18:359–376, 2018.
- Klein-Goldberg A, Maman S, Witz IP. The role played by the microenvironment in site-specific metastasis. Cancer Lett. 352:54-58, 2014.
- Witz IP. Tumor-microenvironment interactions: dangerous liaisons. Adv Cancer Res. 100:203-29, 2008.
- Witz IP. The selectin-selectin ligand axis in tumor progression. Cancer Metastasis Rev, 27:19–30. 2008.
- Witz IP. Yin-yang activities and vicious cycles in the tumor microenvironment. Cancer Res, 68:9–13. 2008.
- Witz IP, Levy-Nissenbaum O. The tumor microenvironment in the post-PAGET era. Cancer Lett. 8. 242:1–10, 2006.
- Eshel R, Neumark E, Sagi-Assif O, Witz IP. Receptors involved in microenvironment-driven molecular evolution of cancer cells. Semin Cancer Biol. 12:139-47. 2002.
- Witz IP. Presence and functions of immune components in the tumor microenvironment. Adv Exp Med Biol. 495:317-24. 2001.
- Sagi-Assif O, Douer D, Witz IP. Cytokine network imbalances in plasmacytoma – regressor mice. Curr Top Microbiol Immunol. 246:395–401. 1999.
- Ran M, Langer AB, Eliassi I, Gohar O, Gonen B, Gradsztajn S, Fridman WH, Teillaud JL, Witz IP. Possibilities of interference with the immune system of tumor bearers by non-lymphoid Fc gamma RII expressing tumor cells. Immunobiology. 185:415-25, 1992.
- Witz IP, Ran M. FcR may function as a progression factor of nonlymphoid tumors. Immunol Res. 11:283-95, 1992.
- Witz IP, Agassy-Cahalon L. Do naturally occurring antibodies play a role in the progression and proliferation of tumor cells? Int Rev Immunol. 3:133-45, 1988.
- Ran M, Witz IP. FcR derived from without the immune system—a potential escape mechanism for cells propagating in a hostile immunological environment. Contrib Gynecol Obstet. 14:83-89, 1985.
- Witz IP, Meyer G. Membrane antigens associated with infection, transformation, and tumorigenesis by polyoma virus. Cancer Immunol Immunother. 17:147-153, 1984.
- Witz IP. Tumor-bound immunoglobulins: in situ expressions of humoral immunity. Adv Cancer Res. 25:95–148, 1977.
- Witz IP. The biological significance of tumor-bound immunoglobulins. Curr Top Microbiol Immunol. 61:151-71,1973.
