= Susan Band Horwitz =

American biochemist

- Born: 1937 (age 88–89); Cambridge, Massachusetts
- Education: Bryn Mawr College, Brandeis University
- Known for: Anti-tumor drugs
- Scientific career
- Fields: Biochemistry
- Workplaces: Tufts University Medical School, Emory University Medical School, Albert Einstein College of Medicine
- Doctoral advisor: Nathan O. Kaplan

Susan Band Horwitz is an American biochemist and professor at the Albert Einstein College of Medicine where she holds the Falkenstein chair in Cancer Research as well as co-chair of the department of Molecular Pharmacology.

Horwitz is a pioneer in dissecting the mechanisms of action of chemotherapeutic drugs including camptothecin, epipodophyllotoxins, and bleomycin, and taxol. Horwitz's work on taxol in particular has brought her international recognition. Horwitz discovered that taxol binds to microtubules, resulting in arrest of the cell cycle in metaphase. Her work paved the way to using taxol and other microtubule binding agents as chemotherapeutics. Taxol remains widely used today, as a means to treat ovarian, breast, and lung cancer. However, since taxol is in short supply, Horwitz is directing studies in her lab to identify similar therapies in natural products.

== Personal life and education ==
Susan Band Horwitz was born in Cambridge, Massachusetts in 1937. She spent her childhood in the Boston area and attended a Boston public high school. She went to Bryn Mawr College for her undergraduate studies and graduated with a degree in biology in 1958. Subsequently, Susan moved on to obtain her PhD in biochemistry at Brandeis University. It was here that she studied the activity of enzymes and enzyme kinetics under Nathan O. Kaplan. More specifically, she focused on hexitol dehydrogenases from several bacteria, including Bacillus subtilis and Aerobacta aerogenes. Following the completion of her PhD program, her next venture was in the Pharmacology department as a postdoctoral fellow at Tufts University Medical School under Roy Kisliuk. Here, she looked at bacterial assays to explore anti folate qualities present in novel compounds. She began teaching pharmacology to the dental students at Tufts. In 1965, Susan and her family moved down to Georgia where she accepted a position in the pharmacology department at Emory University Medical School. In 1967, she migrated back north again, this time to New York where she took a job as a research assistant under Arthur Grollman at the Albert Einstein College of Medicine. She has worked for the Albert Einstein College of Medicine ever since. In 1970, she moved to a full-time job as an assistant professor in the department of pharmacology. From 2002 to 2003, she was the president of the American Association for Cancer Research. She has a membership in several different organizations including, The National Academy of Sciences, the Institute of Medicine of the National Academies, the American Academy of Arts and Sciences and the American Philosophical Society. Throughout the course of Susan's career, she has been published over 250 times.

== Taxol mechanism discovery ==
Horwitz had been working on several anti tumor drugs in her lab that inhibited the cell cycle by binding to DNA. The National Cancer Institute (NCI) contacted her one day in 1977, and inquired whether she would be interested in working on a drug for them, called Taxol. This was a drug that had been obtained from the yew plant Taxus brevifolia. At the time there was only one published article about the drug from 1971. Horwitz happily complied to the offer and received 10 milligrams of the drug from the NCI. She planned to examine the drug with her graduate student, Peter Schiff, for a month. After the month was up, they planned to decide whether or not the project displayed enough promise to continue. By the end of the month, they were heavily invested in the drug due to its outstanding uniqueness. They had discovered that the molecule acted by interacting with microtubules. They performed assays with the molecule to determine what cell cycle phase was arrested by its mechanism of action. The stoppage of the cycle turned out to clearly occur during mitosis, meaning that Taxol stopped the cells from dividing normally.With this realization, they quickly discovered that there was a binding site for the molecule located on the tubulin, which led them to their next discovery that the microtubules were frozen in place when the molecule was bound in this site. The cytoskeleton was essentially stuck in place, which served to inhibit any depolymerization. Their next step in the process was to identify where the binding site was and how the molecule managed to bind effectively. At this point, Horwitz enlisted another colleague, George Orr, to aid in the work. They used photo-affinity analogues to identify putative regions of interaction between the molecule and tubulin. Obtaining these analogues was an arduous task for the team; however, after some time, suitable analogues were synthesized and successfully used in their studies to identify regions of interaction between Taxol and ß-tubulin. Electron crystallography studies from other scientists including Eva Nogales and Ken Downing at the Lawrence Berkeley lab in California, confirmed their initial findings, and following a period of extensive investigation, the binding site for Taxol on ß-tubulin was officially delineated. This revolutionary discovery initiated the search for similar molecules. Even though Taxol® is now a very widely accepted treatment for cancer patients, it is a very hydrophobic molecule and cannot be dissolved in saline for administration to patients. Instead, it must be given to patients in a different solubilizing substance, called cremophor. This is not an ideal substance for bodily injection and because of this, new therapies involving the combination of Taxol with various parts of other molecules are becoming a bigger frontier for research.

== Further research ==
With the search for similar microtubulin binding molecules, scientists explored many natural products in the ocean, specifically sponges. It took around 15 years until another molecule with a similar mechanism was found. In more recent years, the molecules that have been discovered have differing structures from Taxol, however the mechanisms still remain to be similar. One in particular is called, discodermolide. Dr. Horwitz and her team were interested in not only the binding site for the molecule on the microtubule, but also the possible allosteric effects that the molecule may have on other parts of the microtubule. In order to test for these effects, the team used a hydrogen-deuterium exchange process. The results showed that there was in fact several changes that occurred along the microtubule separate from the binding site when the molecule was bound. They found that normal microtubule-associated proteins, or MAPs, were not able to bind to the microtubules in the normal way. When discodermolide and Taxol® were both tested together, the results displayed that they do bind in the same location on the microtubules, however they bind in unique ways from each other. This opened a new door for the team as they decided to attempt making hybrid molecules that would put together the active parts of both of these molecules into one super molecule.

== Awards and honors ==
Horwitz has received many awards for her work over the years. These awards and honors include:

- C. Chester Stock Award from Memorial Sloan Kettering Cancer Center
- Warren Alpert Foundation Prize from Harvard Medical School
- Bristol-Myers Squibb Award for Distinguished Achievement in Cancer Research
- American Cancer Society's Medal of Honor
- AACR Award for Lifetime Achievement in Cancer Research
- Canada Gairdner International Award (2019)
- Szent-Györgyi Prize for Progress in Cancer Research (2020)
