= David M. Livingston =

American physician (1941–2021)

- Born: March 29, 1941
- Died: October 17, 2021 (aged 80)
- Education: Harvard University; Tufts University
- Scientific career
- Workplaces: Dana–Farber Cancer Institute

David M. Livingston (29 March 1941 – 17 October 2021) was the Deputy Director of the Dana-Farber/Harvard Cancer Center, Emil Frei Professor of Genetics and Medicine at Harvard Medical School, chairman of the Executive Committee for Research at Dana–Farber Cancer Institute. Livingston joined the Harvard faculty in 1973. His research focused on breast and ovarian cancer.

He received his undergraduate degree from Harvard College in 1961 and his MD from Tufts Medical School in 1965.

== Awards ==
- 2017 Pezcoller Foundation-AACR International Award for Cancer Research
- 2015 Elected Fellow of the American Association for Cancer Research Academy
- 2012 Robert J. and Claire Pasarow Foundation Medical Research Award in Cancer Research
- 2009 Anthony Dipple Carcinogenesis Award, European Association for Cancer Research
- 2005 AACR-G.H.A Clowes Memorial Award
- 2005 Theodor Boveri Award, German Cancer Society
- 2001 Elected Fellow American Academy of Arts and Sciences
- 1997 Association of American Medical College's Award for Distinguished Research in the Biomedical Sciences, Baxter Allegiance Foundation
- 1995 Elected Member National Academy of Sciences, Washington, D.C.
- 1991 Richard P. and Claire W. Morse Scientific Award, Dana–Farber Cancer Institute
- 1990 Elected Member Institute of Medicine

== Laboratory alumni ==
- William Kaelin, Nobel Laureate in Physiology or Medicine
