= Cytomegalovirus vaccine =

Vaccine to prevent cytomegalovirus (CMV) infection

A Cytomegalovirus vaccine is a vaccine to prevent cytomegalovirus (CMV) infection or curb virus reactivation (symptomatic flare-ups) in persons already infected. Challenges in developing a vaccine include the adeptness of CMV in evading the immune system and limited animal models. As of 2018 no such vaccine exists, although several vaccine candidates are under investigation. They include recombinant protein, live attenuated, DNA and other vaccines.

As a member of the TORCH complex, cytomegalovirus can cause congenital infection, which can lead to neurological problems, vision, and hearing loss. Infection/reactivation of CMV in immunocompromised persons, including organ transplantation recipients, causes significant mortality and morbidity. Additionally, CMV is implicated in the pathogenesis of various chronic conditions including atherosclerosis and coronary artery disease with recent studies indicating a potential link to increased risk of Alzheimer's disease. Therefore naturally there has been considerable effort made towards the development of a CMV vaccine, with particular emphasis on protection of pregnant women. Development of such a vaccine has been emphasized as a priority by the National Vaccine Program Office in the United States.

Since vaccination of the immunocompromised persons introduces additional challenges, members of this population are less likely to be candidates for such a vaccine.

== Recombinant gB subunit vaccine ==
A phase 2 study of a recombinant gB protein subunit CMV-vaccine "gB/MF59" was published in 2009 and indicated an efficacy of 50% in seronegative women of childbearing-age thus the protection provided was limited and a number of subjects contracted CMV infection despite the vaccination. In one case congenital CMV was encountered. Another phase 2 study of the same vaccine was done in patients awaiting kidney transplantation. The vaccine significantly boosted the antibody levels and reduced the duration of post-transplantation viremia.

Despite years of investigation into "gB/MF59" important unresolved questions remain. It appears that immunity to one CMV strain does not mean immunity to all strains, to what extent then will "gB/MF59" which is based on the sequence of the ancestrally-African strain "Towne" provide immunity to diverse strains. Furthermore the immunological mechanism underlying gB-vaccine mediated protection is unclear. Initially it was assumed that antiviral immunity was caused via induction of a virus-neutralising antibody response, but followup analyses have disproved this and the true mechanism of protection is currently unclear.

== Further research ==
In 2013, Astellas Pharma has started on individuals who received a hematopoietic stem cell transplant a Phase III trial with its CMV deoxyribonucleic acid DNA cytomegalovirus vaccine ASP0113.

In 2015, Astellas Pharma has commenced on healthy volunteers a Phase I trial with its cytomegalovirus vaccine ASP0113.

In 2016, VBI Vaccines commenced a Phase I preventative cytomegalovirus vaccine study (VBI-1501).

Other cytomegalovirus vaccines candidates are the CMV-MVA Triplex vaccine and the CMVpp65-A*0201 peptide vaccine. Both vaccine candidates are sponsored by the City of Hope National Medical Center. As of 2016, the development is in clinical phase 2 trial stage.

In March 2019, Helocyte and City of Hope National Medical Center announced positive phase two results for Triplex. They are working on finding funding for Phase III research and then FDA approval.

Moderna was working on mRNA-1647, a mRNA CMV vaccine. It was the first mRNA vaccine to enter phase 2 clinical trials. However, it did not meet primary endpoint in preventing CMV infection in women of child-bearing age to prevent congenital CMV. However, Moderna is continuing to test mRNA-1647 for transplant recipients.
