= Mark M. Davis =

American immunologist (born 1952)

Mark M. Davis ForMemRS
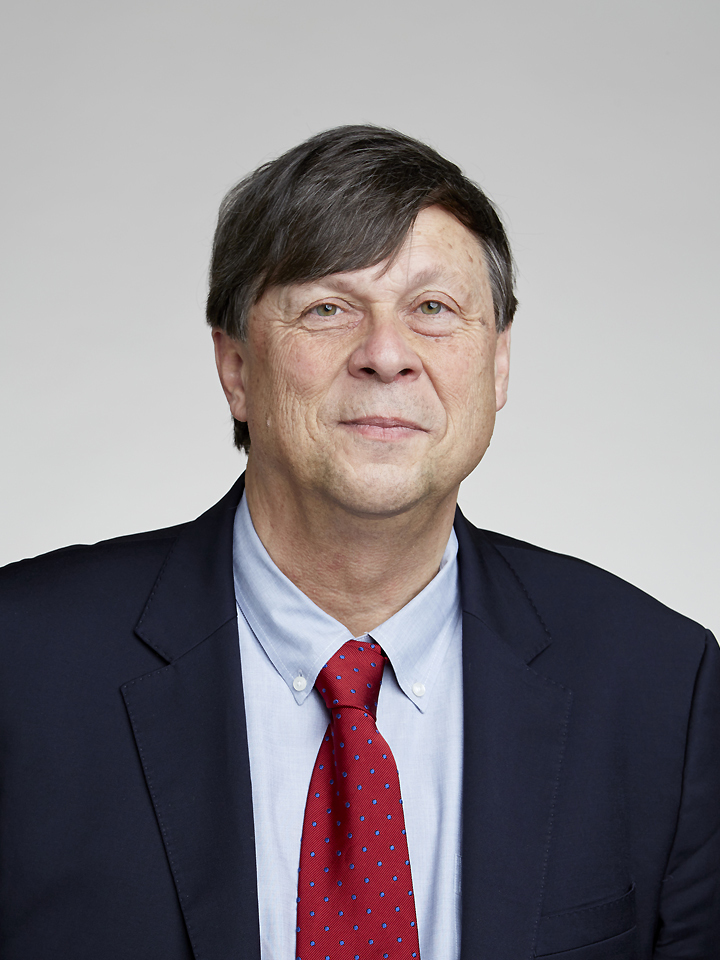
- Davis in 2016
- Born: November 27, 1952 (age 73)
- Education: Johns Hopkins University; California Institute of Technology
- Awards: Gairdner Foundation International Award; William B. Coley Award; Howard Taylor Ricketts Award; King Faisal International Prize; Paul Ehrlich and Ludwig Darmstaedter Prize; Alfred P. Sloan, Jr. Prize; Szent-Györgyi Prize for Progress in Cancer Research
- Scientific career
- Fields: Immunology
- Workplaces: Stanford University
- Thesis: Programmed DNA rearrangements during differentiation : immunoglobulin class switching (1981)
- Doctoral advisor: Leroy E. Hood (advisor); Edward B. Lewis (co-advisor)
- Website: med.stanford.edu/profiles/mark-davis

Mark Morris Davis ForMemRS (born November 27, 1952) is an American immunologist. He is the director of and Avery Family Professor of Immunology at the Institute for Immunity, Transplantation and Infection at Stanford University.

== Education ==
Davis was educated at Johns Hopkins University and the California Institute of Technology (Caltech) where he was awarded a PhD in 1981 for research supervised by Leroy E. Hood.

== Research ==
Davis is well known for identifying the first T-cell receptor genes, which are responsible for T lymphocytes ability to "see" foreign entities, solving a major mystery in immunology at that time. He and his research group have made many subsequent discoveries about this type of molecule, specifically concerning its biochemical properties and other characteristics, including the demonstration that T cells are able to detect and respond to even a single molecule of their ligand-fragments of antigens bound to major histocompatibility complex cell surface molecules. He also developed a novel way of labeling specific T lymphocytes according to the molecules that they recognize, and this procedure is now an important method in many clinical and basic studies of T cell activity, from new vaccines against cancer to identifying "rogue" T cells in autoimmunity. In recent years his research has increasingly focused on understanding the human immune system, from developing broad systems biology approaches to inventing new methods to help unravel the complexities of T cell responses to cancer, autoimmunity and infectious diseases.

== Awards and honors ==
Davis has won numerous awards including:

- Passano Young Scientist Award together with James Edward Rothman in 1985
- Eli Lilly and Company Research Award in 1986
- Howard Taylor Ricketts Award in 1987
- Gairdner Foundation International Award in 1989
- Elected a member of the National Academy of Sciences in 1993
- King Faisal International Prize in 1995
- Alfred P. Sloan, Jr. Prize together with Tak W. Mak in 1996
- Membership in the American Academy of Arts and Sciences in 2000
- William B. Coley Award in 2000
- Paul Ehrlich and Ludwig Darmstaedter Prize together with Tak Wah Mak in 2004
- Elected a Foreign Member of the Royal Society (ForMemRS) in 2016
- Szent-Györgyi Prize for Progress in Cancer Research with Tak Wah Mak in 2021
