= Zika virus vaccine =

Vaccine in development

A Zika virus vaccine is a vaccine designed to prevent the symptoms and complications of Zika virus infection in humans.

== Background ==
As Zika virus infection of pregnant women may result in congenital defects in the newborn, the vaccine will attempt to protect against congenital Zika syndrome during the current or any future outbreak. As of April 2019, no vaccines have been approved for clinical use, however a number of vaccines are currently in clinical trials. The goal of a Zika virus vaccine is to produce specific antibodies against the Zika virus to prevent infection and severe disease. The challenges in developing a safe and effective vaccine include limiting side effects such as Guillain-Barré syndrome, a potential consequence of Zika virus infection. Additionally, as dengue virus is closely related to Zika virus, the vaccine needs to minimize the possibility of antibody-dependent enhancement of dengue virus infection.

== Prospects ==
=== DNA vaccine ===
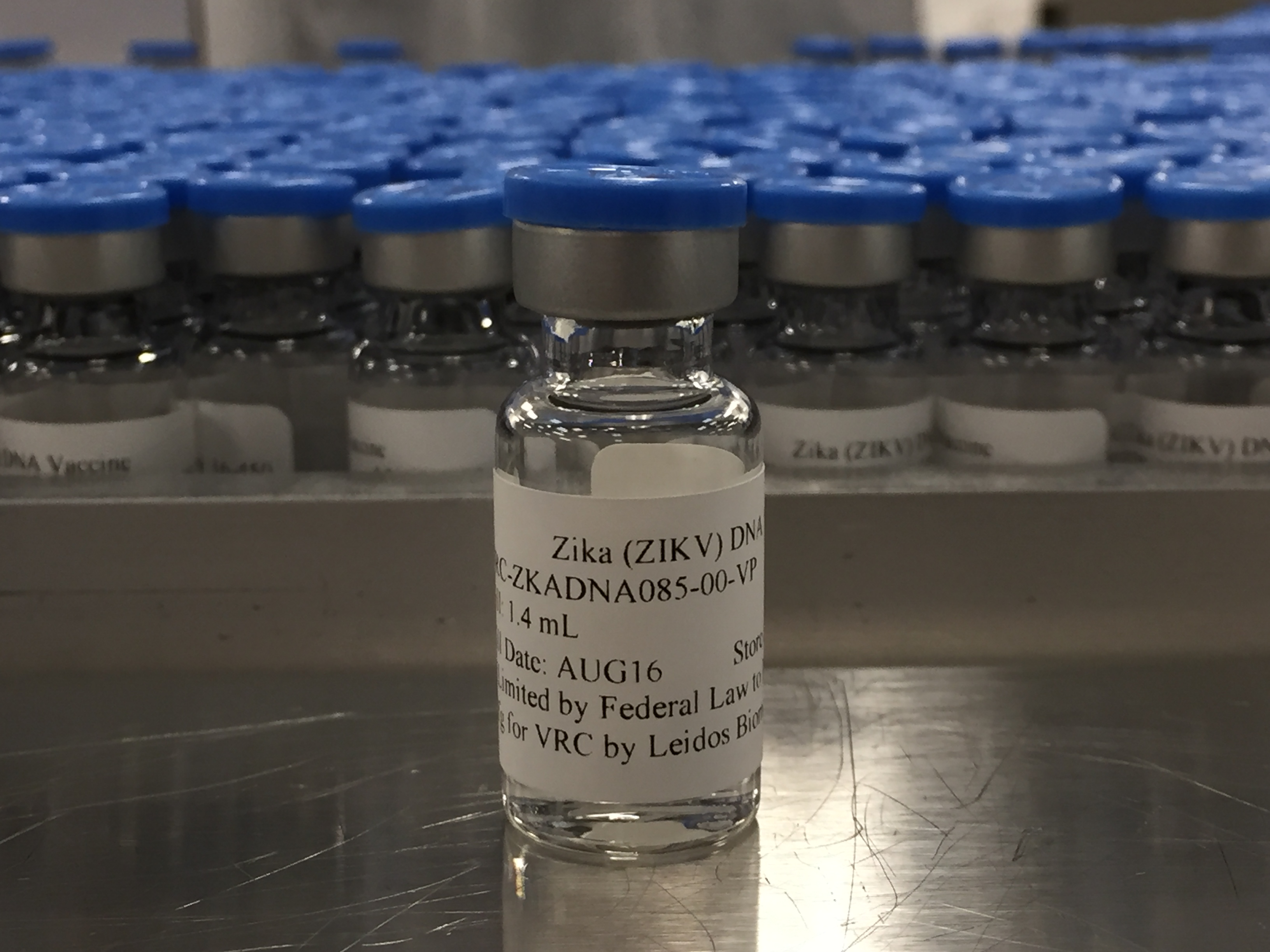
A vial of a DNA vaccine for Zika virus submitted for testing

As of March 31, 2017 a DNA vaccine has been approved for Phase 2 clinical trials in humans. The vaccine consists of a DNA plasmid encoding the E and PrM proteins which make up the outer protein coat of the Zika virus virion. Based on a previous platform used to develop a West Nile virus vaccine, the DNA vaccine is designed to assemble protein particles that mimic Zika virus and trigger the body's immune response.

=== Purified inactivated vaccine (ZPIV) ===
A purified inactivated vaccine is currently under development by the Walter Reed Army Institute of Research. This vaccine is based on the same technology used to develop a vaccine against Japanese Encephalitis Virus. As the ZPIV vaccine contains inactivated Zika particles, the virus cannot replicate and cause disease in humans. U.S. Army researchers agreed to give Sanofi permission to develop the technology, but protest in Congress halted the venture. Initial results at Beth Israel Deaconess Medical Center and at other hospitals involved in the early clinical trials were considered to be promising.

=== Live attenuated vaccine ===
A live attenuated vaccine, in which the virus is genetically altered as to not cause disease in humans, is undergoing phase 1 clinical trials. This vaccine is based on the dengue vaccine Dengvaxia, which has been approved for use in humans.

In November 2026, a Subject Expert Committee of India's Central Drugs Standard Control Organisation recommended Phase I clinical trials for India's first Zika vaccine, a recombinant live attenuated freeze-dried vaccine developed by Indian Immunologicals Limited's Human Biologicals Institute in partnership with Griffith University, Australia.

=== mRNA vaccine ===
A modified mRNA vaccine developed in collaboration with Moderna Therapeutics containing the E and PrM proteins is undergoing concurrent phase 1 and 2 clinical trials.

=== Viral vector-based vaccines ===
Multiple vaccines are also being developed using safe, non-pathogenic, viruses as vectors for immunogenic Zika virus proteins. One phase 1 trial is using the Measles virus as a vector and was completed in April 2018. Another vaccine platform makes use of Adenovirus as a vector and phase 1 studies will be complete in 2019. Adenoviruses have been previously used as a vaccine platform for HIV and elicit a strong immune response. A chimeric Binjari-Zika vaccine is highly effective for immunization in mice.
