= Harvey Feigenbaum =

American cardiologist

- Born: 20 November 1933 (age 92); East Chicago, Indiana, United States of America
- Education: Indiana University (A.B., M.D.)
- Occupations: Physician and professor
- Employer(s): Indiana University (Director of Non-Invasive Diagnostic Cardiac Laboratories); Indiana University Medical Center (resident since 2000) Philadelphia General Hospital (resident since 2000)
- Known for: Father of Echocardiography

Harvey Feigenbaum (born 1933) is an American cardiologist known for his life-long work in the field of echocardiography. He wrote the first textbook on the subject in 1972, which is currently in its 8th edition, and has published over 300 articles. He has trained generations of cardiologists including many of the world's pioneers in the field through his numerous visitors, frequent workshops, annual courses in Indianapolis, Indiana beginning in 1968, the year when he started formal fellowship training He founded the field of cardiac sonography in 1965 and the American Society of Echocardiography in 1975. His seminal article on the diagnosis of pericardial effusions published in 1965 with his technique "brought echocardiography to the attention of thousands of practitioners".

== Personal history ==
Feigenbaum was born on November 20, 1933, in East Chicago, Indiana. He is the youngest of the four children of Tillie and Julius Feigenbaum. His parents were Jewish immigrants from Europe. He graduated from East Chicago Washington High School.

== Indiana University ==
Feigenbaum attended Indiana University in Bloomington and graduated with a degree in anatomy and physiology in 1954. He finished his doctorate in medicine at the same institution four years later. He went on to spend his medical internship at Philadelphia General Hospital from 1958 to 1959. He then returned to the Indiana University Medical Center in Indianapolis for his residency and fellowship in cardiology under the direction of Dr. Charles Fisch. During his fellowship, Feigenbaum completed training in cardiac catheterization at the National Institute of Health in Bethesda, Maryland and then started the catheterization program at the Indiana University Medical Center.

Feigenbaum became interested in studying cardiac hemodynamics. It was difficult to use catheterization to measure volumes which were essential for this endeavor. Along with his former cardiac fellow, Richard Popp, MD, the two were the first to show a clear correlation between left ventricular echo dimensions and angiographic volumes Many consider measuring the size of the left ventricular chamber and estimating its function to be the groundbreaking work that brought echocardiography to the mainstream of echocardiology. Even though pericardial effusions are serious, they are not very common. Information on left ventricular size and function is vital for every patient with known or suspected heart disease.

Since 1965, Feigenbaum and his colleagues have gone on to create multiple advances in echocardiography. They described how echocardiography could detect many abnormalities of the cardiac valves and chambers, developed early strip chart recorders for M-mode echocardiograms, introduced early 2-dimensional echocardiographic transducers and demonstrated digital techniques for recording and displaying echocardiograms, and performed echocardiograms with exercise and pharmacologic stress which were all developed at Indiana University.

== Career ==
Outside of his medical professorship at Indiana University, Feigenbaum founded the American Society of Echocardiography. The organization publishes its own journal, where Feigenbaum serves as editor.

== Awards ==
- 1976 Texas Heart Institute Medal and Ray C. Fish Award for Outstanding Achievement in Cardiovascular Disease
- 1977 Modern Medicine Award for Distinguished Achievement
- 1977 Lewis A. Conner Lecture, American Heart Association
- 1979 Richard and Hinda Rosenthal Award, American Heart Association, Outstanding Achievement in Cardiovascular Research
- 1980 Distinguished Alumnus, IU School of Medicine
- 1986 Distinguished Alumnus, IU College of Arts and Sciences
- 1988 Gifted Teacher Award, American College of Cardiology
- 1989 Robert J. and Claire Pasarow Foundation, Award for Excellence in Cardiovascular Medicine, Los Angeles, CA
- 1992 Eugene Drake Memorial Award, American Heart Association
- 1997 Luminary Award for Scholarly Accomplishment in Science, Pisa, Italy
- 1998 Louis F. Bishop Lecture, American College of Cardiology
- 1998 World of Difference Lifetime Achievement Award from the Indiana Health Industry Forum
- 2000 Feigenbaum Lecture inauguration at the American Society of Echocardiography
- 2002 Cor vitae Award from the Midwest Affiliate of the American Heart Association
- 2004 Primio Mantevergine Award as the "Father of Modern Echocardiography" Naples, Italy
- 2005 Living Legend Award from the Indiana Historical Society
- 2005 American Heart Association Distinguished Scientist
- 2006 International Honorary Member, Japanese College of Cardiology
- 2006 Honorary Member of the Mexican Society of Cardiology
- 2016 Honorary Member of the European Society of Cardiovascular Imaging
- 2020 IU Bicentennial Medal by Indiana University [10]
