= National Foundation for Cancer Research =

American nonprofit organization

National Foundation for Cancer Research (NFCR) is an American nonprofit organization founded in 1973. It provides funds to cancer scientists and researchers, with the ultimate goal of a cure for cancer.

== Awards ==
The Szent-Györgyi Prize for Progress in Cancer Research, established by the NFCR and named in honor of Albert Szent-Györgyi, Nobel Laureate and co-founder of NFCR, has been awarded annually since 2006 to outstanding researchers whose scientific achievements have expanded the understanding of cancer and whose vision has moved cancer research in new directions. The Szent-Györgyi Prize honors researchers whose discoveries have made possible new approaches to preventing, diagnosing and/or treating cancer.
