= CNRS Gold Medal =

French scientific research award

The CNRS Gold Medal is the highest scientific research award in France. It is presented annually by the French National Centre for Scientific Research (CNRS) and was first awarded in 1954. Moreover, the CNRS Silver Medal is given to researchers for originality, quality, and importance, while the CNRS Bronze Medal recognizes initial fruitful results. (Note: The CNRS web pages list gold medal winners since 1954, but silver and bronze medal winners only since 2000. However, bestowals for the latter are reported as early as 1958 and 1969, e.g. to Yvonne Choquet-Bruhat and Évariste Sanchez-Palencia, respectively.)

== Gold medal recipients ==
- 1954 Émile Borel – Mathematics
- 1955 Louis de Broglie – Physics
- 1956 Jacques Hadamard – Mathematics
- 1957 Gaston Dupouy – Physics
- 1958 Gaston Ramon – Immunology
- 1959 André Danjon – Astrophysics
- 1960 Raoul Blanchard – Geography
- 1961 Pol Bouin – Physiology
- 1962 Marcel Delépine – Chemistry
- 1963 Robert Courrier – Biology
- 1964 Alfred Kastler – Physics
- 1965 Louis Néel – Physics
- 1966 Paul Pascal – Chemistry
- 1967 Claude Lévi-Strauss – Ethnology
- 1968 Boris Ephrussi – Genetics
- 1969 Georges Chaudron – Chemistry
- 1970 Jacques Friedel – Physics
- 1971 Bernard Halpern – Immunology
- 1972 Jacques Oudin – Immunology
- 1973 André Leroi-Gourhan – Ethnology
- 1974 Edgar Lederer – Biochemistry
- 1975 Raymond Castaing – Physics, and Christiane Desroches Noblecourt – Egyptology
- 1976 Henri Cartan – Mathematics
- 1977 Charles Fehrenbach – Astronomy
- 1978 Maurice Allais – Economics, and Pierre Jacquinot – Physics
- 1979 Pierre Chambon – Biology
- 1980 Pierre-Gilles De Gennes – Physics
- 1981 Jean-Marie Lehn – Chemistry, and Roland Martin – Archaeology
- 1982 Pierre Joliot – Biochemistry
- 1983 Evry Schatzman – Astrophysics
- 1984 Jean Brossel – Physics, and Jean-Pierre Vernant – History
- 1985 Piotr Slonimski – Genetics
- 1986 Nicole Le Douarin – Embryology
- 1987 Georges Canguilhem – Philosophy, and Jean-Pierre Serre – Mathematics
- 1988 Philippe Nozieres – Physics
- 1989 Michel Jouvet – Biology
- 1990 Marc Julia – Chemistry
- 1991 Jacques Le Goff – History
- 1992 Jean-Pierre Changeux – Neurobiology
- 1993 Pierre Bourdieu – Sociology
- 1994 Claude Allègre – Geophysics
- 1995 Claude Hagège – Linguistics
- 1996 Claude Cohen-Tannoudji – Physics
- 1997 Jean Rouxel – Chemistry
- 1998 Pierre Potier – Chemistry
- 1999 Jean-Claude Risset – Computer-Music
- 2000 Michel Lazdunski – Biochemistry
- 2001 Maurice Godelier – Anthropology
- 2002 Claude Lorius – Climatology, and Jean Jouzel – Climatology
- 2003 Albert Fert – Physics
- 2004 Alain Connes – Mathematics
- 2005 Alain Aspect – Physics
- 2006 Jacques Stern – Computer-Sciences
- 2007 Jean Tirole – Economics
- 2008 Jean Weissenbach – Genetics
- 2009 Serge Haroche – Physics
- 2010 Gérard Férey – Chemistry
- 2011 Jules A. Hoffmann – Biology
- 2012 Philippe Descola – Anthropology
- 2013 Margaret Buckingham – Developmental Biology
- 2014 Gérard Berry – Computer-Sciences
- 2015 Éric Karsenti – Biology
- 2016 Claire Voisin – Mathematics
- 2017 Alain Brillet – Physics, and Thibault Damour – Physics
- 2018 Barbara Cassin – Philosophy
- 2019 Thomas Ebbesen – Physical chemistry
- 2020 Françoise Combes – Astrophysics
- 2021 Jean Dalibard – Physics
- 2022 Jean-Marie Tarascon – Chemistry
- 2023 Sandra Lavorel – Ecology
- 2024 Edith Heard – Biology
- 2025 Stéphane Mallat – Mathematics and Computer Science
- 2026 Jacqueline Bloch – Physics
