= Bernard Dujon =

French geneticist

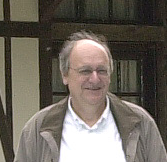
- Born: 8 August 1947 (age 79); Meudon, Seine, French Fourth Republic
- Occupation: Geneticist

Academic background
- Education: UPMC
- Thesis: (1976)
- Doctoral advisor: Piotr Słonimski

Academic work
- Discipline: Natural sciences
- Sub-discipline: Genetics

Bernard Dujon is a French geneticist, born on August 8, 1947, in Meudon (Seine). He is Professor Emeritus at Sorbonne University and the Institut Pasteur since 2015. He is a member of the French Academy of sciences.

== Early life and education ==
Bernard Dujon grew up as a teenager in the Paris suburban area and went to school at Maisons-Laffitte, where his parents settled in 1958. He became interested in biology very early and at the age of eleven started collecting biological material from his natural environment, plants, fossils, insects, shells, etc. He became in 1965 a laureate of the Concours Général, a nation-wide yearly contest, at the same time he was obtaining his baccalauréat. He started a degree of biology at the Faculté des Sciences de Paris the same year. He graduated in the top 1% of students and was offered the opportunity to compete for an oral exam at Ecole Normale Supérieure (ENS rue d'Ulm), was ranked first and admitted there the following year (1966). He therefore became a normalien at the early age of 19, when most of the students attracted by this career are still preparing in specialized schools for this written and oral competition. There, he attended lectures at the Faculté de Sciences for two years, before choosing genetics as a specialization during his third year. After a master's degree in genetics from Pierre and Marie Curie University, Paris (1968), he received a Diploma of Advanced Studies (DEA) in Advanced Genetics (1969). Subsequently, instead of preparing the agrégation, that would have ensured a permanent position in the education system, he decided to follow doctorate studies under the supervision of Piotr Slonimski, a Polish-French geneticist, at the French National Centre for Scientific Research (CNRS) campus of Gif-sur-Yvette, in the southern parisian suburban area. At the same time, he was recruited as a junior scientist by the CNRS (1970), allowing him to complete his PhD thesis, while earning a salary to support his family. He eventually obtained a Doctorate in Natural Sciences, specializing in genetics, in 1976, from the Pierre and Marie Curie University.

== Functions in science and education ==
He was a trainee, then attaché, chargé and research master at the CNRS from 1970 to 1983, then a Professor at the Pierre and Marie Curie University from 1983 to 2015, at the same time part-time assistant professor at the Ecole Polytechnique (1984-1988). From 1989 to 1992 he was Head of Laboratory at the Institut Pasteur, then Professor from 1993 to 2015. He was the head of the Unité de Génétique Moléculaire des Levures from 1989 to his retirement in 2015.

Among the other functions occupied during his career, he has been appointed scientific deputy director general of the Institut Pasteur from 2006 to 2008, by the director general, Alice Dautry, and from 1997 to 2011 he was a senior member of the Institut Universitaire de France. He is Emeritus Professor at the Institut Pasteur.

== Scientific achievements ==
Dujon's scientific work focuses on the genetic material of eukaryotic organisms, its organization, dynamics, functioning and evolution. Most of his work has used the yeast Saccharomyces cerevisiae, as experimental material, but he also got interested in studying other yeasts of biotechnological or medical interest, such as Kluyveromyces lactis and Candida glabrata.

=== The early years : discovery of the first homing endonuclease ===
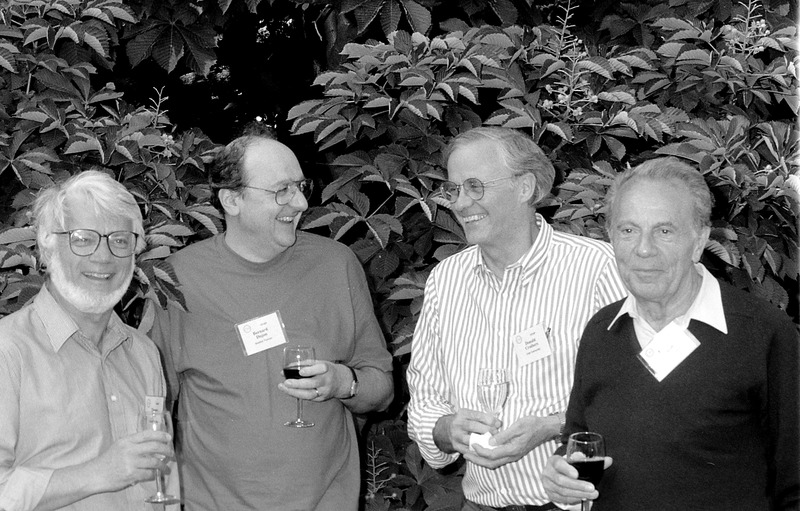
Bernard Dujon (second from the left) and François Jacob (right) attending a Cold Spring Harbor Laboratory meeting in the 1980s.

In Gif-sur-Yvette, Bernard Dujon started to study a strange genetic phenomenon, linked to mitochondrial genetics, whose study was still in infancy. When crossing two haploid yeast species carrying different mitochondrial mutations, conferring the resistance to erythromycin or to chloramphenicol, allele segregation did not follow mendelian rules and recombinants appeared in mysterious proportions. At that time, no one had any idea of the genetic content of mitochondria, except that it contained DNA. Bernard Dujon was studying a particular mitochondrial locus, called omega, that could be present as two different alleles, omega+ or omega-. Genetic crosses between yeast cells carrying different alleles led to highly distorted inheritance in the progeny, since almost all cells ended up carrying the omega+ allele! In 1974, he proposed a model in which gene conversion of the omega- allele to omega+ was achieved by homologous recombination, replacing one allele by the other, copying in the process the flanking erythromycin and chloramphenicol mutations.

At about the same time, recombinant DNA technologies and restriction enzymes were discovered. In 1977, independent researches by Fred Sanger on one side and by Walter Gilbert and Allan Maxam on the other, led to the invention of two different methods to sequence DNA. Later the same year, introns were discovered. Thermal denaturation studies with François Michel, another student of Piotr Slonimski, suggested that omega could be an intron. Bernard Dujon contacted Walter Gilbert at Harvard University about the possibility to come to his lab for a short post-doctoral period, in order to sequence the omega locus. He moved to Harvard the following year and in 1979 achieved the sequence of what would become the first mobile intron to be described. But the most surprising result was not that omega was indeed an intron, but that it contained an open reading frame, putatively encoding a 235 amino acid protein with no homology to any known protein. At that time, no intron was supposed to be coding. Could it be that the encoded protein played a role in the intron mobility between omega- and omega+ strains ?

Back to Gif-sur-Yvette in 1981, Bernard Dujon set up a small team in an old lab space lent by Piotr Slonimski. François Michel rapidly joined him and later on Alain Jacquier, Hugues Blanc, Pierre Dehoux and Laurence Colleaux, as well as sabbatical visitors such as Walt Fangman from the University of Washington. They discovered that the omega intron was present in other yeast species collected in Harvard. Following the sequencing of several other introns, François Michel discovered that these introns could be folded into stem-loops whose structures (if not their sequences) were conserved. This suggested that they could be directly involved in the splicing mechanism by defining exon-intron junctions. In addition, they discovered that two different intronic structures existed, defining what they called group I and group II introns, a nomenclature still in use today. They published their models of intron folding in Biochimie in 1982 and this article quickly became a reference for researchers in the field.

But the precise function of the omega-encoded protein was still unknown. Bernard Dujon decided to adapt the mitochondrial gene to the universal genetic code in order to be able to express it in a heterologous system. At that time, it was a real tour de force, since oligonucleotide synthesis and in vitro mutagenesis were uncommon and not available in Gif-sur-Yvette. Fortunately, Bernard Dujon met Francis Galibert, who was working at the Hôpital Saint Louis in Paris and who just came back from Fred Sanger laboratory to set up his own lab. At that time, he was the only one in France to be able to synthesize oligonucleotides. With the help of Francis Galibert's oligonucleotides, Bernard Dujon modified 26 of the 235 codons of the omega reading frame to adapt it to the universal genetic code. Synthesis of the resulting protein in Escherichia coli, in the presence of a plasmid carrying the omega-sequence showed without any ambiguity, in 1985, that the omega protein was a double-strand DNA endonuclease, as was predicted by the model 12 years ago. This nuclease took afterwards the conventional name of I-SceI, the first intron homing endonuclease discovered, first of its kind but dozens of others would rapidly follow.

In 1987, a call for a yeast geneticist was published by the Institut Pasteur. Bernard Dujon applied and left Gif-sur-Yvette to move to Paris. In this new scientific environment, he used I-SceI to the purpose of making unique double-strand breaks in complex genomes, such as mouse, plants or the human genome, in collaboration with many scientists worldwide. In collaboration with the laboratory of Jean-François Nicolas at the Institut Pasteur, Arnaud Perrin and André Choulika (who would later become two founding members of the biotech company Cellectis) were able to do the first gene replacement in mouse cells using I-SceI, at the same time Maria Jasin in United States was doing similar experiments in human cells.

=== The yeast genome project ===
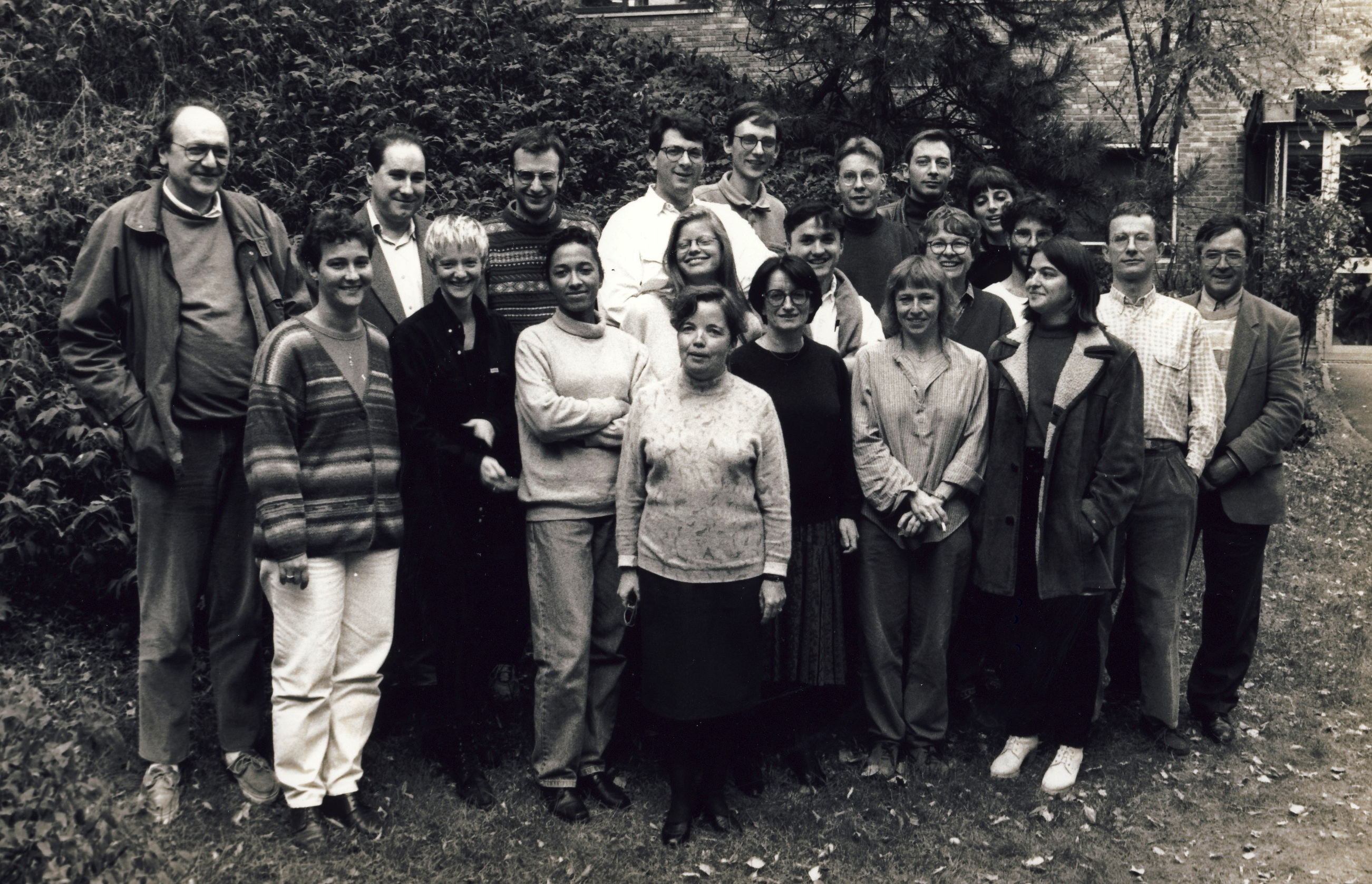
The "yeast teams" of the Institut Pasteur in 1995. Pierre Legrain (second from the right) and Alain Jacquier (not on this picture) set up their own yeast laboratory in 1995, as the first "bud" of Bernard Dujon (left) laboratory. Several young researchers and students on this picture have since set up their own laboratory.

In 1988, André Goffeau, a Belgian yeast geneticist from the University of Louvain-la-Neuve convinced the European Commission to support the complete sequencing of the yeast genome. Under his management, 30 European laboratories collaborated to this endeavor. Their goal was to sequence 10 kb of DNA in two years of time, in order to complete chromosome III sequence, one of the smallest ones. Later on, they were joined by other labs worldwide to help sequencing the 15 other chromosomes. Bernard Dujon took an active part in this project and was one of the leading figures of the yeast program. He coordinated the sequencing of two chromosomes out of sixteen (XI and XV) and the map of a third chromosome (VII) was made by Hervé Tettelin, André Goffeau's student, using the I-SceI chromosome fragmentation technology developed in the meantime. The yeast genome sequence was completed in 1995 and published one year later. During the course of this project, it was discovered that one third of the sequenced genes had no homologue in any database (the so-called "orphans"). The extremely high level of gene redundancy, due -at least in part- to an ancient whole-genome duplication in the ancestor of Saccharomyces species, led to a new era in biology. Genomics, freshly born as a new science, will be studying entire genomes, instead of individual genes, and try to understand genome organization and evolution.

=== The Génolevures program ===
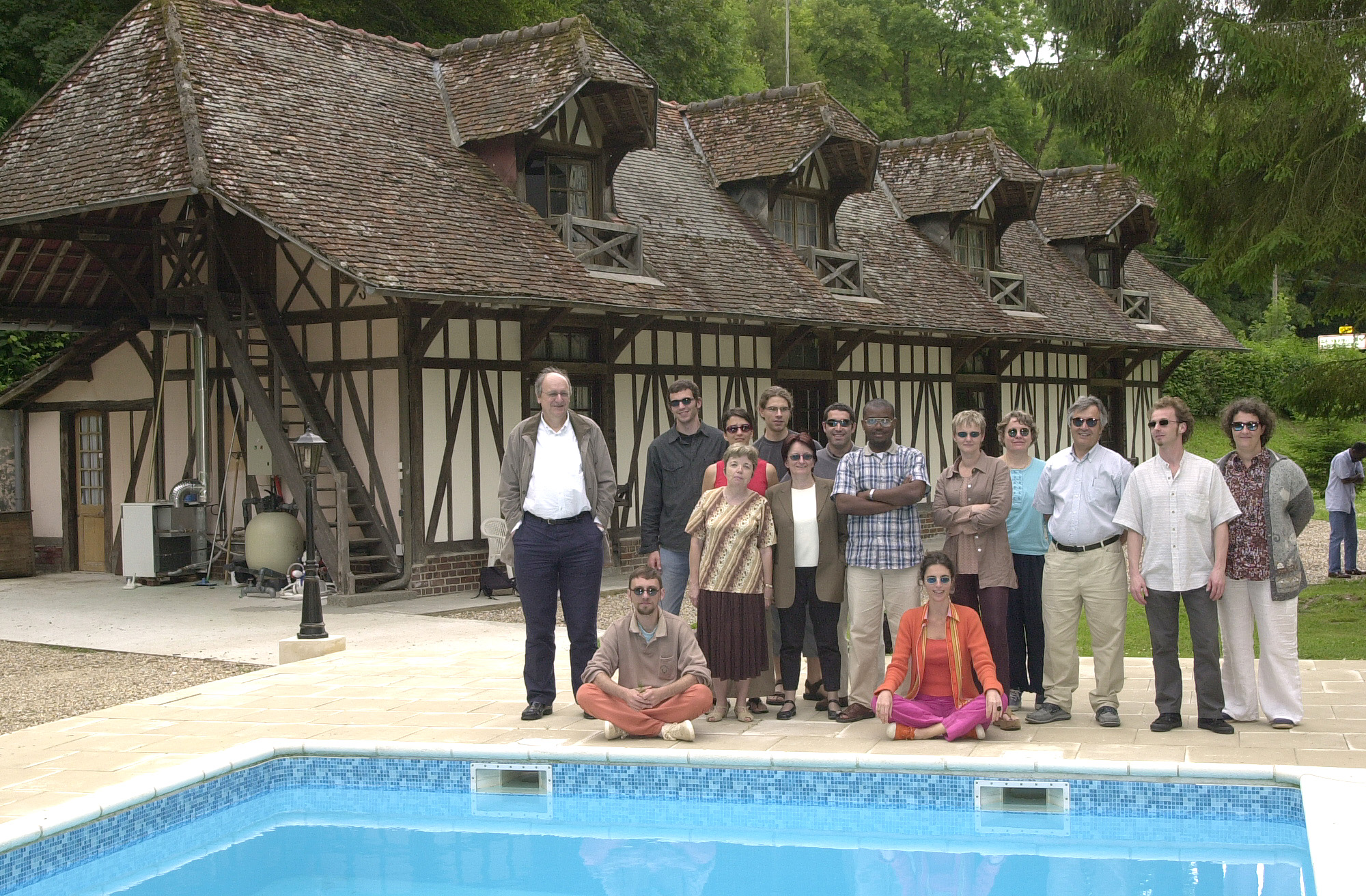
Bernard Dujon laboratory at the departemental retreat in Normandy, in 2002. From left to right (standing): Bernard Dujon, Romain Koszul, Ingrid Lafontaine, Martine Rambaud, Stefan Pellenz, Jeanne Boyer, Christophe Hennequin, Emmanuel Talla, Agnès Thierry, Odile Ozier-Kalogeropoulos, Fredj Tekaia, Gilles Fischer, Cécile Fairhead. From left to right (sat): Guy-Franck Richard, Emmanuelle Fabre.

While Bernard Dujon was participating to the EUROFAN program, aiming at determining the function of all discovered genes, he started a completely different approach, based on yeast comparative genomics. Odile Ozier-Kalogeropoulos and her Master student, Alain Malpertuy, had produced 600 sequence reads of a yeast of biotechnological interest, Kluyveromyces lactis. This allowed them to identify hundreds of new genes by direct comparison with the S. cerevisiae genome. By analogy with Expressed Sequence Tags (EST) that were widely used at that time as a proxy to estimate the number of different human genes and their expression tissues, Alain Malpertuy coined these sequences Random Sequence Tags (RST) and the acronym was subsequently kept for further similar studies.

Following an informal discussion with Jean Weissenbach, head of the Génoscope, the largest sequencing center in France, Bernard Dujon contacted two French geneticists who were known to be interested in non-conventional yeast species: Jean-Luc Souciet at the University of Strasbourg and Claude Gaillardin at the National Center for Agronomy (INRA) in Grignon. Together, with several French laboratories sharing similar scientific interests, they decided to sequence to low coverage 13 yeast species representing the various branches of the Saccharomycotina (formerly known as Hemiascomycetes), some of them of biotechnological or medical interest. At the end of the year 1998, the Génoscope offered 50 000 sequence reads for this project, 40 millions of nucleotides, roughly corresponding to 0.2-0.4 X coverage of each of the 13 genomes. Altogether, 20 000 new genes were discovered and allowed to compare sequence divergence, synteny, gene redundancy and functions among these 13 species and between them and S. cerevisiae. These yeasts revealed at the level of their genomes, large evolutionary distances between them . Their comparison made possible to develop new theories on the molecular mechanisms of evolution of eukaryotic genomes which, thanks to the power of genetics in S. cerevisiae, can be directly subjected to experimentation. Results were published in a special issue of FEBS Letters, edited by Horst Feldman and appeared in press just a few days before the end of the 20th century.

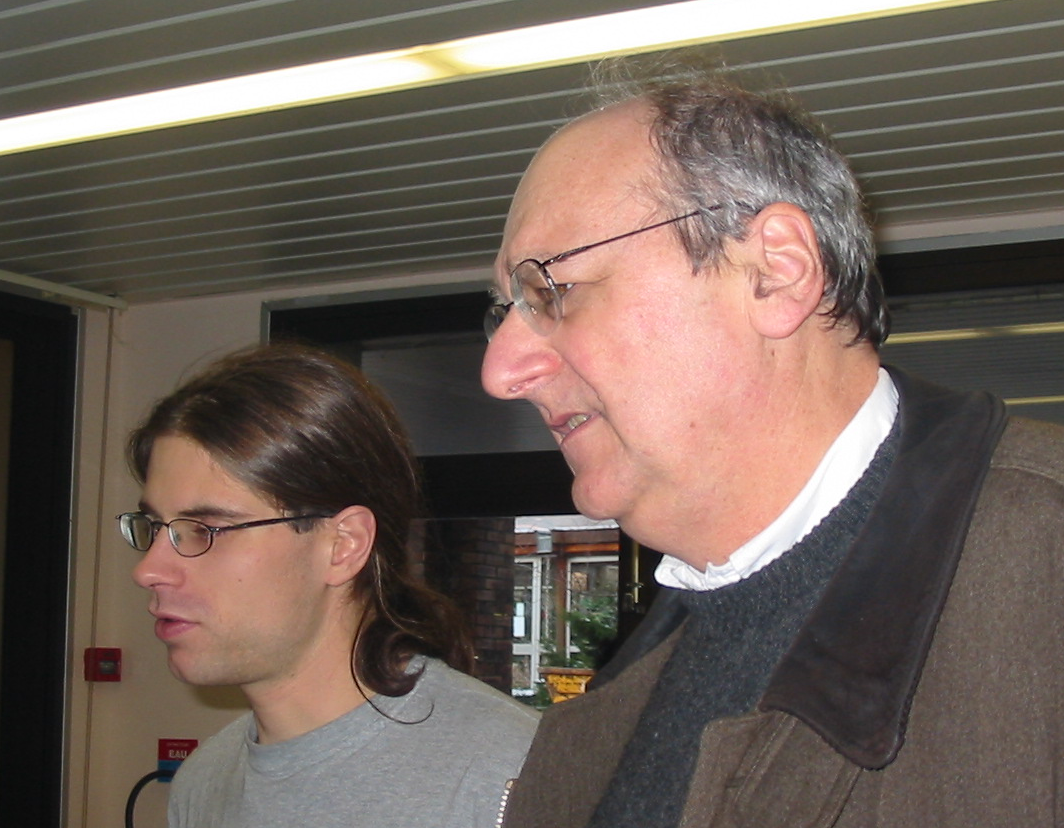
Bernard Dujon and one of his PhD students, Stefan Pellenz, at the Institut Pasteur in 2004.

Following this project, a landmark for subsequent yeast comparative genomics studies, the CNRS offered to support the French consortium, under the name Génolevures (levure being the French word for yeast). Note that the financial support was limited to coordination, but did not cover sequencing nor subsequent data analysis. The Génolevures consortium sequenced to completion four yeast genomes, Candida glabrata, Kluyveromyces lactis, Debaryomyces hansenii and Yarrowia lipolytica. Numerous functional and comparative studies were made from these sequences, including genes involved in replication, recombination and repair, mating and meiosis, short and long tandem repeats, tRNA genes, introns, pseudogenes, telomeres and subtelomeres and evolution of the genetic code. These results were published in Nature, as well as in several other scientific journals.

=== The origin of genes and chromosomal amplifications ===
Sequencing yeast genomes led to the discovery of many new genes of unknown function, phylogenetically unrelated. This led to the question of their very origin. Bernard Dujon tried to tackle this problem by setting up an experimental system to study the evolution of tRNA genes. During the course of these experiments, he discovered that yeast strains in which an essential amino-acyl-tRNA synthetase had been replaced by its homologue from Yarrowia lipolytica, a distantly related yeast, were severely unfit. However, normal growth revertants appeared in the culture at a high frequency. Whole-genome sequencing of these mutants showed that the chromosomal segment containing the foreign tRNA synthetase had been amplified by a rolling circle mechanism, creating a variety of aberrant chromosomal structures under constant evolution. While looking for tRNA duplication, Bernard Dujon discovered the amplification of its cognate tRNA synthetase.

=== Interspecific hybridizations ===
Interested in interspecific hybridizations that spontaneously occurred frequently in nature, Bernard Dujon's last scientific project was to create artificial yeast species, resulted from forced hybridization between two known yeast species, and to study genome evolution of these new hybrids. This was the PhD project of Lucia Morales, last of the many students trained by Bernard Dujon over the course of his career. Making these hybrids at the bench proved to be much more challenging than initially expected, suggesting that laboratory conditions may not favor interspecific hybridizations between distant yeast species.

=== Bernard Dujon legacy ===
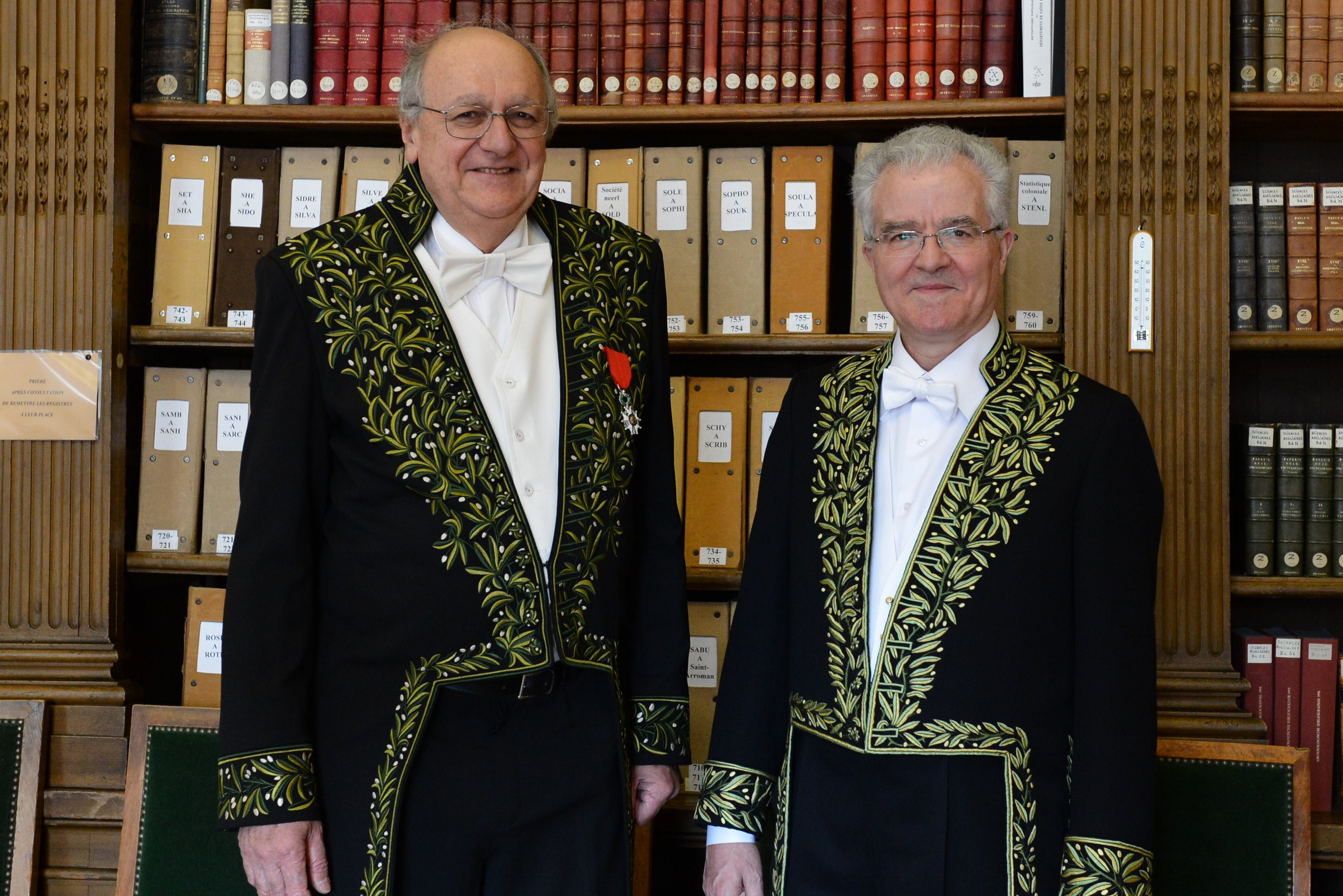
Bernard Dujon (left) and his colleagues (Eric Westhof), wearing the "Habit vert" of the Institut de France.

Bernard Dujon retired in 2015, at the age of 68 and became Emeritus Professor. Over the 26 years during which the Unité de Génétique Moléculaire des Levures was operating, more than 120 people have worked there, 250 scientific publications were produced shared with more than 800 colleagues all over the world and 22 PhD thesis and Habilitations à diriger des recherches were defended. As Bernard Dujon put it at the end of his retirement talk, in March 2016: "Scientific research was a successful globalization."

Many of his former students or post-docs have continued in biological research or related fields, many of them obtaining positions in academic research and starting their own lab in France or abroad (alphabetically): Guillaume Chanfreau (UCLA), Laurence Colleaux (Institut Imagine), Alain Jacquier (Institut Pasteur), Romain Koszul (Institut Pasteur), Emmanuelle Fabre (Hôpital Saint Louis), Cécile Fairhead (Université Paris-Saclay), Gilles Fischer (Sorbonne Université), Bertrand Llorente (Université Aix-Marseille), François Michel (Gif-sur-Yvette), Anne Plessis (Université Paris Diderot), Emmanuel Talla (Université Aix-Marseille), Hervé Tettelin (University of Maryland) and Teresa Teixeira-Fernandes (Sorbonne Université).

=== Scientific books ===
Bernard Dujon is the author of a vulgarization book on genetics, as well as of a textbook entitled Trajectoires de la génétique. He recently published a recollection of his scientific -and personal- life in FEMS Yeast Research.

== Honors and awards ==
He is a member of Academia Europaea (since 2000), a member of the French Academy of sciences (since 2002), and a member of the U.S. National Academy of Inventors since 2017. He has been Vice President of the French Society of Genetics.

He has won the Thérèse Lebrasseur Prize from the Fondation de France (1991) the René and Andrée Duquesne Prize (2009), and been named a Doctor Honoris Causa of the University of Perugia, Italy (2016).

He became a Chevalier of the National Ordre of the Légion d'Honneur in 2000, an Officier of the Ordre national du Mérite in 2014, and a Chevalier of the Palmes Académiques in 2018.
