= Lumír Krejčí =

Czech biochemist (born 1972)

Lumír Krejčí (born 30 March 1972 in Slavičín) is a Czech biochemist. His research is focused on regulatory processes involved in maintaining genome integrity. Currently, as associate professor in biochemistry, he leads the laboratory of recombination and DNA repair (LORD) at the Department of Biology, Faculty of Medicine, at Masaryk University in Brno.

His laboratory has worked on understanding how Rad51 paralogs act during homologous recombination.

At Masaryk University, Lumír Krejčí organizes Mendel Lectures, a series of lectures given by the world's top scientists, and he is the founders of BIOSKOP - Research Education Center.

== Publications ==
His most cited papers are:

- Krejci L, Van Komen S, Li Y, Villemain J, Reddy MS, Klein H, Ellenberger T, Sung P. "DNA helicase Srs2 disrupts the Rad51 presynaptic filament." Nature. 2003 May;423(6937):305. Cited 558 times according to Google Scholar
- Papouli E, Chen S, Davies AA, Huttner D, Krejci L, Sung P, Ulrich HD. Crosstalk between SUMO and ubiquitin on PCNA is mediated by recruitment of the helicase Srs2p. Molecular cell. 2005 Jul 1;19(1):123-33. Cited 486 times according to Google Scholar
- Sung P, Krejci L, Van Komen S, Sehorn MG. Rad51 recombinase and recombination mediators. Journal of Biological Chemistry. 2003 Oct 31;278(44):42729-32. Cited 433 times according to Goggle Scholar

== Early life and education ==
Lumír Krejčí was born in Slavičín in the Zlín Region of the Czech Republic. He received his BSc and MSc degrees in biochemistry from Masaryk University, in 1993 and 1995, respectively. During his PhD studies at Masaryk University, he spent 5 years as a fellow at Aarhus University in Denmark under supervision of Christian Bendixen. Afterwards, Krejčí conducted postdoctoral research work between 2001 and 2005 with Patrick Sung, initially at University of Texas Health Science Center at San Antonio (2001–2003), later at Yale University (2003–2005).

== Research ==
Throughout his career, Lumír Krejčí was mainly interested in understanding the mechanisms living organisms use to cope with genome instability, more precisely homologous recombination. His key finding during this period concerns the role of Srs2 helicase in dismantling Rad51 nucleofilament in homologous recombination. Recently his laboratory focuses also on identification of new anticancer compounds.

=== Laboratory of Recombination of DNA Repair (LORD) ===
In 2005, Krejčí moved back to Brno, where he was appointed Principal Investigator, and later in 2012 Associate Professor. The main objectives of his lab's research are “to decipher the intrinsic functions of homologous recombination (HR) which has a dual role in the maintenance of genome stability. First, it promotes the faithful repair of DNA double-strand breaks (DSBs) belonging among of the most lethal forms of DNA damage. Moreover, HR is responsible for the creation of genetic variability during meiosis by directing the formation of reciprocal crossovers that result in random combinations of alleles and traits.”

His main contributions concerns: (i) the effect of post-translational modification of diverse HR proteins by Sumo protein (examples include: Rad52., Rad59, PCNA); (ii) elucidation of the molecular mechanism of the key step of HR, recombination-associated DNA synthesis; (iii) role of paralogues of RAD51 in promoting RAD51 filament stability

Currently, the laboratory focuses on two main topics, development of novel active compounds targeting diverse nucleases and understanding the regulation of RAD51 nucleofilament.

== Personal life ==
Lumír Krejčí is married to Kateřina Krejčí, with whom he has three children.
