= Genset =

Genset, generating set or generator set may refer to:

- Diesel generator, a combination of diesel engine and electric generator
- Engine-generator, a machine used to generate electricity
- Fuel cell, a machine used to generate electricity
- Genset Corporation, a French biotechnology company
- Genset locomotive, a railway locomotive using multiple engine-generators per vehicle for traction power
- Portaset, as EP Tender, a portable battery set to extend electric vehicle range
