= Arthur Vigan =

French astrophysicist

- Born: 1983 (age 42–43)
- Awards: ERC Starting grant (2017); CNRS Bronze Medal (2021)
- Scientific career
- Fields: Astrophysics
- Institutions: Centre national de la recherche scientifique Laboratoire d'Astrophysique de Marseille; European Southern Observatory; University of Exeter
- Website: astro.vigan.fr

Arthur Vigan is a French astrophysicist known for his work on the study of exoplanets using the direct imaging technique, and on the development of novel instrumentation related to that detection method. He is a full time researcher at Centre National de la Recherche Scientifique (CNRS) and works at Laboratoire d'Astrophysique de Marseille. In 2021 he received the CNRS Bronze Medal for his early career achievements.

== Academic career ==
Arthur Vigan studied optical engineering at Institut d'Optique Graduate School until 2006, before starting a PhD thesis at Aix-Marseille University in 2006. In 2009, he defended his thesis entitled Détection et caractérisation des exoplanètes par imagerie directe avec IRDIS. From 2010 to 2012, he was Associate Research Fellow in the astrophysics group at the University of Exeter. He is then recruited as full-time junior researcher at the French CNRS. In 2015, he spends one year at the European Southern Observatory (ESO) in Chile to follow the installation, commissioning and operations of the SPHERE exoplanet imager at the Very Large Telescope (VLT).

His main research interest is the study of young giant exoplanets with the direct imaging detection technique. He uses large imaging surveys to study the demographic properties of these planets and understand their formation processes. He also works on the development of novel instrumentation for large ground-based telescopes to do imaging and spectroscopy of exoplanets. He is the principal investigator of the HiRISE (High-Resolution Imaging and Spectroscopy of Exoplanets) instrument installed on the VLT, which connects the SPHERE and CRIRES instruments with infrared optical fibers to improve the characterisation of known exoplanets.

== Awards ==
- 2017 : 1.5M€ starting grant from the European Research Council (ERC) for project HiRISE
- 2021 : CNRS Bronze Medal
