= Daniel Ricquier =

French biochemist

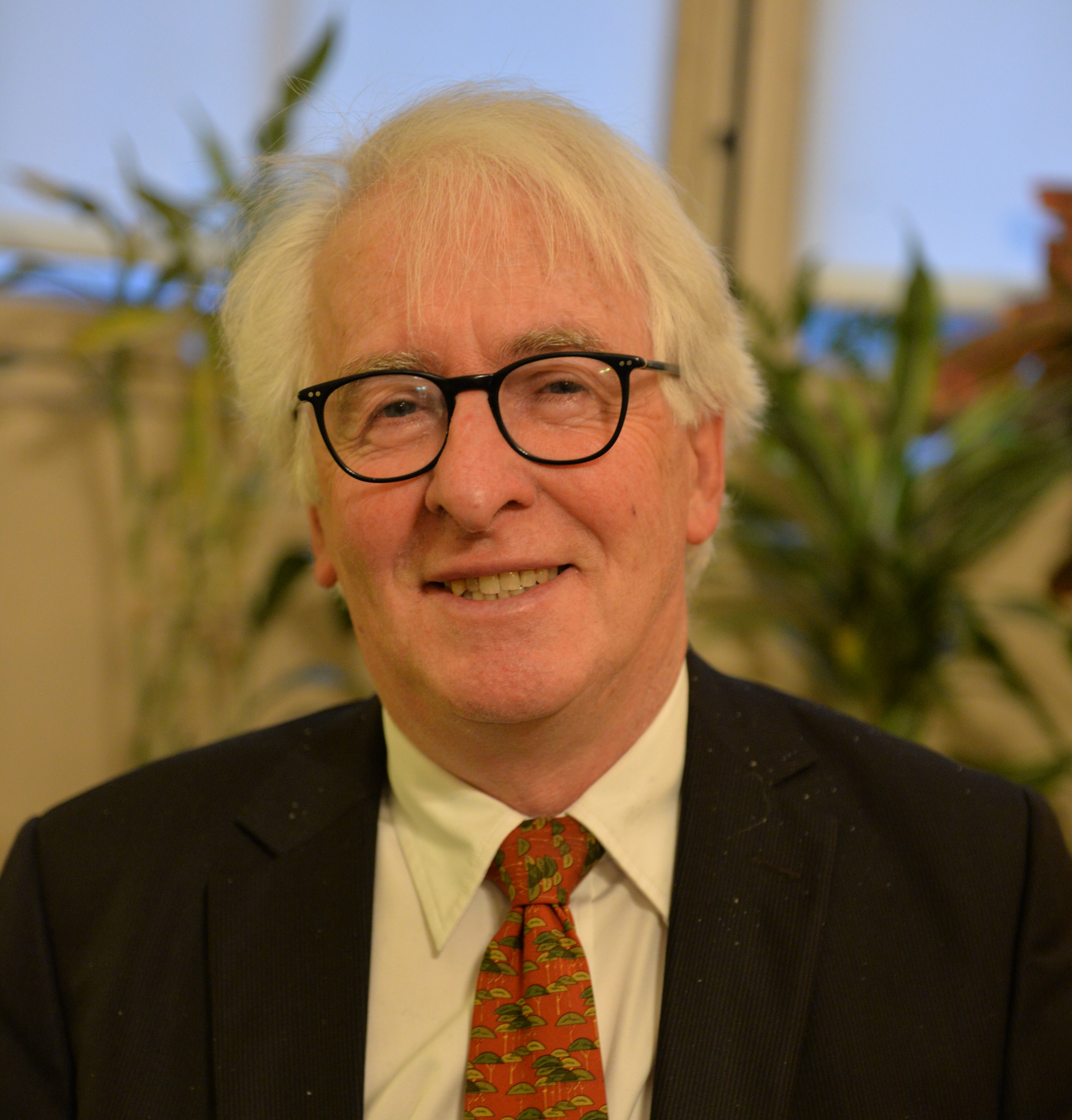
Daniel Ricquier – December 2016

Daniel Ricquier (born 19 May 1949), is a French biochemist known for his work in mitochondria and hereditary metabolic diseases. Ricquier has been a member of the French Academy of Sciences since 2002, and a professor of biochemistry and Molecular Biology at the Faculty of Medicine of the University of Paris Descartes since 2003.

== Biography ==
Ricquier is a university professor and hospital practitioner at faculté of medicine at the University of Paris-Descartes, and at the Necker-Enfants malades Hospital, since 2003.

He directed the "Centre de recherche sur l'endocrinologie moléculaire et le développement" of the CNRS in Meudon from 1997 to 2002, then the CNRS unit "Biologie des Transporteurs mitochondriaux et métabolisme" from 2002 to 2008 at faculté́ de médecine Necker Paris Descartes and at the Institut de recherches Necker-Enfants Malades. He was Head of the Metabolic Biochemistry Department at Necker Enfants Malades Hospital and at AP-HP from 2003 to 2014. He was elected a member of the Academy of Sciences on 19 November 2002.

== Works ==
Ricquier specializes in the physiology and biochemistry of mitochondria, adipose tissue and thermogenic mechanisms. He is an expert on brown adipose tissue. His work has contributed towards identifying a family of proteins involved in mitochondrial respiration, ATP yield, heat production and mitochondrial control of the level of cellular oxygenated free radicals.

Ricquier described in 1976 a mitochondrial membrane protein specific for brown adipocytes, later named UCP (uncoupling protein) and identified by David Nicholls as the protein responsible for heat energy dissipation. Having isolated antibodies specific to this protein, he demonstrated brown adipocytes in neonates and adult patients and demonstrated that the sympathetic nervous system controls the development of brown adipose tissue and the synthesis of DCS in animals and humans. With Fréderic Bouillaud, in 1984 and in collaboration with Jean Weissenbach at the Pasteur Institute, he isolated and sequenced the complementary DNA of the UCP and the UCP gene from rodents and humans. He then analyzed the mechanisms of control of the tissue-specific transcription of the UCP gene. In addition, he studied the functional organization of this membrane protein.

Ricquier identified and characterized in 1997 a second UCP protein called UCP2, the brown adipocyte UCP being renamed UCP1. He also identified a new cerebral mitochondrial transporter, BMCP, an avian UCP and a renal mitochondrial transporter KMCP and contributed to the identification of the first plant UCP protein. He was able to obtain mice without the UCP2 gene, demonstrating the essential role of this gene in innate immunity and the limitation of free radical levels, particularly in macrophages in collaboration with Denis Richard at Laval University. This function of UCP2 has been confirmed by the demonstration of a protective role of UCP2 against atherosclerosis.

Ricquier has demonstrated that mutations in the UCP2 protein induce congenital hyperinsulinism in children at birth. He also described a protective role for UCP2 against autoimmune diabetes. Applications of the work include metabolic diseases (obesity, diabetes), nutrition, degenerative diseases and autoimmune diseases involving oxygenated free radicals in atherosclerosis and neurodegeneration.

== Honours ==
- 1988: Paul Langevin Prize from the French Academy of sciences
- 1989: CNRS silver medal
- 1995: F. Wasserman Medal of the European Association for the Study of Obesity
- 2000: Grand Prix des industries agro-alimentaires from the French Academy of sciences
- 2002: Member of the French Academy of sciences
- 2002: Wertheimer Medal from the International Association of Study on Obesity
- 2013: Chevalier in the Ordre de la Légion d'Honneur
- 2012–2017: Deputy Vice-president for International Relations of the French Academy of sciences
