= Anne Ephrussi =

French biologist (born 1955)

- Born: 15 September 1955 (age 70); Paris
- Education: Harvard, MIT (PhD 1983)
- Known for: Study of post-transcriptional regulation
- Parents: Boris Ephrussi (father); Harriett Ephrussi-Taylor (mother)
- Awards: Chevalier de l’Ordre National du Mérite, France; Chevalier de la Légion d’Honneur, France [20]; Feldberg Prize
- Scientific career
- Fields: Developmental and molecular biology
- Institutions: Harvard, Whitehead Institute, European Molecular Biology Laboratory
- Doctoral advisor: Susumu Tonegawa
- Other academic advisors: Thomas Maniatis, Ruth Lehmann

Anne Ephrussi (born 15 September 1955 in Paris, France) is a French developmental and molecular biologist. Her research is focused on the study of post-transcriptional regulations such as mRNA localization and translation control in molecular biology as well as the establishment of polarity axes in cell and developmental biology. She is director of the EMBL International Centre for Advanced Training (EICAT) program at the European Molecular Biology Laboratory (EMBL) since 2005 and served as head of the Developmental Biology Unit from 2007 to 2021.

== Biography ==
Anne Ephrussi studied biology at Harvard University in the Department of Biochemistry and Molecular Biology from where she graduated in 1979. She continued to do her PhD at the Massachusetts Institute of Technology (MIT) in the group of Susumu Tonegawa where she received her doctoral degree in 1985. Ephrussi performed postdoctoral research at Harvard University in the lab of Thomas Maniatis from 1986 to 1989 and at the Whitehead Institute for Biomedical Research with Ruth Lehmann from 1989 to 1992. Since 1992, Anne Ephrussi has been a group leader at the European Molecular Biology Laboratory (EMBL). She became the head of EMBL International Centre for Advanced Training in 2005. She served as Associate Dean (1999 - 2005) and Dean (2005 - 2008) of Graduate Studies of the EMBL International PhD program and as head of the developmental biology unit (2007-2021). She is part of numerous international Scientific Advisory Boards and Panels, organizes international conferences and scientific meetings and evaluates research grant and fellowship applications for a variety of renowned funding bodies.

== Personal Details ==
Anne Ephrussi has French and American citizenship. She is the daughter of Boris Ephrussi and Harriett Ephrussi-Taylor. She lives in Heidelberg, is married and has one child.

== Research ==
With her research, Anne Ephrussi has contributed to the elucidation of the crucial role that spatial and temporal control of mRNA localization and translation play in oocyte development and cell polarity.

Ephrussi established that oskar RNA is accumulated at and thereby defines the posterior pole of the Drosophila oocyte. Aberrant localization and translation leads to germ cell formation defects and mispatterning during development. Proper localization of oskar mRNA is ensured by concerted actions of the exon junction complex and oskar's 3’ UTR followed by a microtubule-based movement. During transport, translation of oskar is repressed by the RNA-binding protein Bruno, which is in turn released by the binding of activators (e.g. Orb) upon arrival at the posterior pole. After proper localization, oskar RNA is translated and organizes germ plasm by recruiting other proteins such as Vasa.

Her lab's current research continues to focus on spatial and temporal control of translation and which role ribonucleoprotein complexes (RNPs), cytoskeletal polarization and cytoskeletal motors play in RNA localization. Further, the roles of non-canonical RNA binding proteins in development as well as germ plasm assembly and function are investigated. These questions are tackled using a combination of genetics, biochemistry and a broad spectrum of cell biological and imaging approaches using the large Drosophila melanogaster oocyte as a model.

== Honors and awards ==
- 1995 – Elected member of EMBO
- 2000 – IUBMB E.C. Slater Lecture
- 2008 – Elected member of the French Academy of Sciences
- 2010 – Elected member of the Academia Europaea
- 2011 – Chevalier de l’Ordre National du Mérite, France
- 2015 – Chevalier de la Légion d’Honneur, France
- 2022 – Feldberg Prize
- 2022 – Elected Member of the National Academy of Sciences, USA
- 2023 – Society for Developmental Biology Lifetime Achievement Award
- 2024 – FEBS | EMBO Women in Science Award 2024
- 2026 – Chair, Working Group on Women in Science at FEBS Executive Committee

== Editorial Boards ==
- Senior Editor, Editorial Board Trends in Cell Biology (since 1997)
- Editorial Board, Genes to Cells (since 2003)
- Advisory Board, WIREs RNA (since 2009)
- Editorial Board, Cell (since 2009)
- Editorial Board, RNA (2018-2021)
- Editorial Board, Journal of Cell Biology (since 2018)
