= Karsenti =

Karsenti is a surname. Notable people with the surname include:

- Éric Karsenti (born 1948), French biologist
- Sabine Karsenti (born 1974), French Canadian actress
- Valérie Karsenti (born 1968), French actress

== See also ==
- Karsenty
- 13333 Carsenty, main-belt asteroid
