= Russians in Lebanon =

Regions with significant populations
- Beirut (Greater Beirut)

Languages
- Russian, Arabic (Lebanese Arabic)

Religion
- Russian Orthodox Church

Russians in Lebanon are people of Russian origin residing in Lebanon. The Russian community in Lebanon has a church where the community gathers to practice Orthodox mass on Sundays and it is located in Mazraa, Beirut.

The Russian Center for Science and Culture (RCSC) plays a prominent role in the Russian-speaking community of Lebanon.

== Notable people ==
- Andre Choulika, biotechnologist (born in Beirut to a Russian father and a Lebanese mother)

== See also ==
- Lebanon–Russia relations
- Russians
- Russian diaspora
