= Pascal Brandys =

French engineer and entrepreneur

- Born: November 30, 1958 (age 67); Roanne, France
- Occupations: Engineer, entrepreneur
- Notable work: Vaccine development against SARS-CoV-2 and Nipah virus

Pascal Brandys (born 30 November 1958, in Roanne) is a French engineer and entrepreneur. He is a graduate of the École Polytechnique and received his M.S. in Economic Systems from Stanford University in 1982.

== Career ==
He began his career in venture capital first in Tokyo and then in London, where he contributed to the first wave of biotechnology companies in Europe. He was the former president and founder of Genset Corporation, which became the European flagship in the field of genomics and at some point the second largest biotechnology company in Europe. He was also a co-founder and former president of France Biotech, the trade association of biotechnology companies in France. In 2001 he co-founded the biotechnology holding company Biobank in San Diego. In 2020 he co-founded Phylex BioSciences, Inc., a company based in San Diego developing mRNA nanoparticle vaccines against the severe acute respiratory syndrome coronavirus 2 (SARS-CoV-2) and the Nipah virus. In 2022 he published positive results of a protection study with a vaccine against the SARS-CoV-2 delta variant. In 2024 and 2025 he published positive results of immunogenicity studies with a mRNA nanoparticle vaccine against the Nipah virus in collaboration with the CDC.

In 1999, Brandys was awarded Outstanding Service to Biotechnology Award at the Seventh Annual European Life Sciences conference held in Amsterdam.
