= Karsenty =

Karsenty is a surname. Notable people with the surname include:

- Bernard Karsenty (1920–2007), member of the French Resistance during World War II
- Gérard Karsenty, American geneticist
- Philippe Karsenty (born 1966), French media analyst

== See also ==
- Karsenti
- 13333 Carsenty, main-belt asteroid
