= Boris Ephrussi =

Russo-French geneticist (1901–1979)

- Born: May 9, 1901; Moscow, Russian Empire
- Died: May 2, 1979 (aged 77); Paris, France
- Education: Sorbonne University; California Institute of Technology
- Spouse: Harriett Ephrussi-Taylor
- Children: Anne Ephrussi (daughter)
- Awards: Rosenstiel Award (1972) Louisa Gross Horwitz Prize (1974)
- Scientific career
- Workplaces: Johns Hopkins University; Institut de biologie physico-chimique
- Academic advisors: T.H. Morgan
- Doctoral students: Piotr Słonimski

Boris Samoylovich Ephrussi (Russian: Борис Самойлович Эфрусси; 9 May 1901 – 2 May 1979), Professor of Genetics at the University of Paris, was a Russo-French geneticist.

Ephrussi was born on 9 May 1901 into a Jewish family. His father, Samuel Osipovich Ephrussi, was a chemical engineer; his grandfather, Joseph Ephrusi (Efrusi), was the founder of a banking dynasty in Kishinev. He published two papers in November 1966 which represented a key step in a decade of research in his laboratory. This research helped transform mammalian, and especially human, genetics.

Boris started his scientific training as a Russian émigré in 1920. He studied the initiation and regulation of embryological processes by intracellular and extracellular factors. A major strand of his early research concerned the effect of temperature on the development of fertilized sea urchin eggs. In this work he used a micromanipulator, which was developed by Robert Chambers, an American biologist.

During Ephrussi's time, writing a second dissertation was standard practice in France. Ephrussi's involved culturing tissues. Ephrussi ran into difficulties typically associated with early tissue culture techniques, but despite these obstacles Ephrussi managed to conclude from studies of brachyury in mice that intrinsic factors (i.e. genes) play a key role in development.

As the next phase of his career, Ephrussi coupled his embryological concerns with a firm conviction that one must understand the role of genes in order to decipher embryological processes. He moved to Caltech in 1934 and stayed until 1935 to learn genetics within the intellectual empire of T.H. Morgan. This move was supported by the Rockefeller Foundation. During this period he conducted important work with George Beadle, who joined him in Paris in the autumn of 1935. There they produced results from experiments with Drosophila eye transplants. This became integral to the work of Beadle and Tatum, who were working with Neurospora, and from this research developed the 'one gene, one enzyme' hypothesis. During World War II, Ephrussi spent most of his time as a refugee at Johns Hopkins University. Following this he began work in France on yeast and cytoplasmic genetics. He began working at the Institut de biologie physico-chimique (the Rothschild Institute) in Paris, and later worked at the CNRS at Gif-sur-Yvette, where he studied the contribution of cytoplasm to the cell phenotype and pursued the interactions between nuclear and cytoplasmic genetic endowments necessary to the yielding of an intact, functioning (albeit single-celled) organism. Boris Ephrussi was a pioneer in questioning the consensus at the time that heredity could be accounted for exclusively by nuclear genes. Ephrussi famously said, "we cannot determine the truth of a hypothesis by counting the number of people who believe it."

Ephrussi was elected to the American Academy of Arts and Sciences (1958), the United States National Academy of Sciences (1961), and the American Philosophical Society in 1970.

Ephrussi continued to work on the topics he was primarily interested until the late 1970s. Topics covered included

- using hybrids with teratomas to explore determination and differentiation (e.g. Finch and Ephrussi 1967; Kahan and Ephrussi 1970).
- negative regulation of differentiated function (e.g. Davidson, Ephrussi and Yamamoto 1966; Fougbre, Ruiz and Ephrussi 1972).
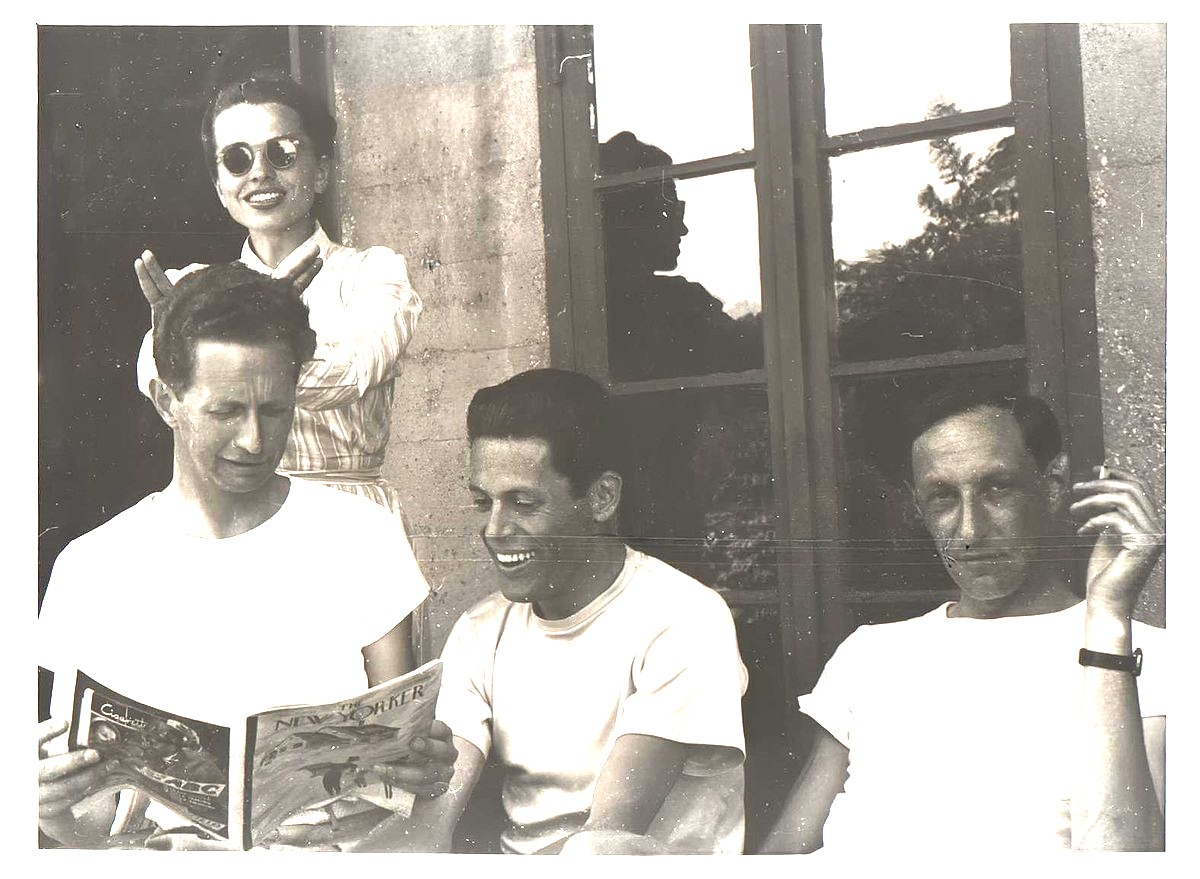
  From left to right- Harriet Taylor, André Lwoff, Jacques Monod, Boris Ephrussi with an issue of the New Yorker at the Cold Spring Harbor Symposium.
- cellular and genetic biological approaches over a direct attack at the molecular level (Ephrussi 1970, p. 12).

In 1974 Ephrussi won a Louisa Gross Horwitz Prize from Columbia University. Ephrussi lived to see that transplantation was transforming into a genetic tool that would take on a new and more powerful aspect in the molecular era. However he died before seeing the genetic advances made by DNA recombination studies which had been set in motion by the studies he had undertaken. It can be said that Ephrussi was a pioneer of embryology and a main contributor to the reconciliation of modern genetics and Embryology.

He was married to Harriett Ephrussi-Taylor (1918–1968), a geneticist. His daughter, Anne Ephrussi, is a geneticist at the European Molecular Biology Laboratory.
