= André Choulika =

Lebanese biotechnologist (born 1965)

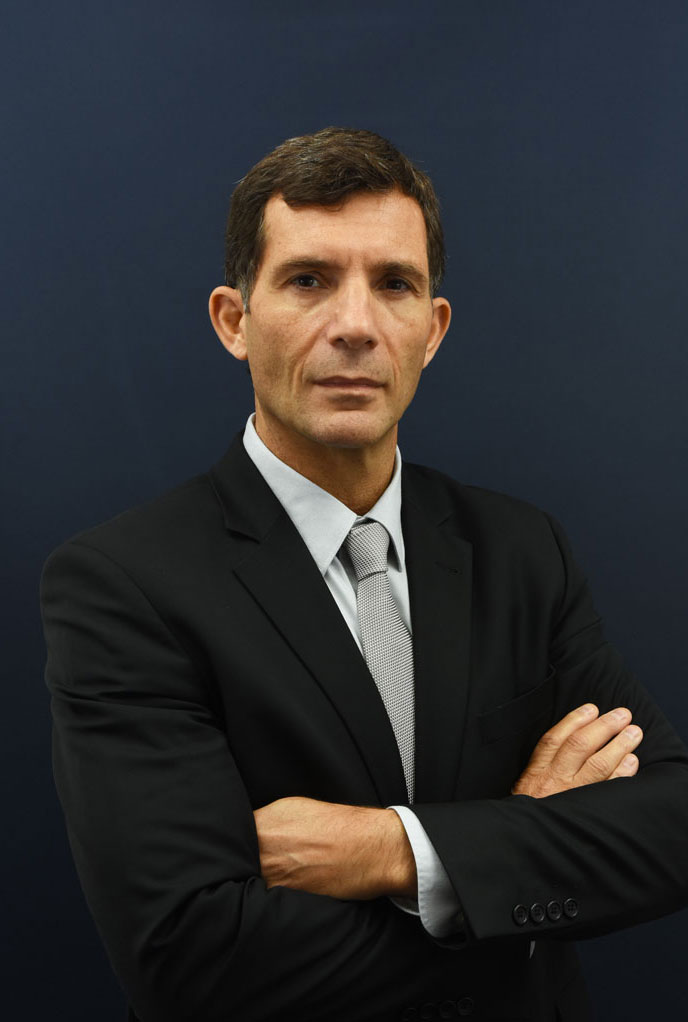
- Born: Beirut, Lebanon
- Education: Pierre and Marie Curie University, Institut Pasteur, Harvard Medical School, Boston Children's Hospital
- Known for: genome editing technologies
- Scientific career
- Fields: Biology and Genetics
- Workplaces: Cellectis
- Academic advisors: Bernard Dujon, Richard C. Mulligan, François Jacob,

André Choulika (born 1965) is a biotechnologist, the inventor of nuclease-based genome editing and a pioneer in the analysis and use of meganucleases to modify complex genomes.

== Early life and education ==
André Choulika was born 1965 in Beirut, Lebanon to a Russian father and a Lebanese mother. He left Lebanon in 1982, arriving in France via Nicosia, Cyprus.

After attending school in Nice, he went on to study biology and virology at Pierre and Marie Curie University (Paris VI), where he joined Professor Bernard Dujon's lab. He earned his DEA degree at the Pasteur Institute in the laboratory of François Jacob, who was awarded the 1965 Nobel Prize in medicine and is considered to be the father of genetic research. While working with Jean-François Nicolas, Bernard Dujon and Arnaud Perrin in the early 1990s, Choulika was the first to use snipping nucleases (meganucleases) to edit genes in mammalian cells, giving rise to the modern field of gene editing.

After receiving his doctorate in molecular virology from Pierre and Marie Curie University-Paris VI, André completed a postdoctoral fellowship with Richard C. Mulligan at Harvard Medical School in the Department of Genetics. This work represented the first use of chimeric nucleases to edit genomes by homologous recombination. Later, while working in the Division of Molecular Medicine at Boston Children's Hospital, he developed the first approaches to meganuclease-based human gene therapy.

== Innovation and entrepreneurship ==
In 1999, Choulika founded the biopharmaceutical company Cellectis as a spin-off from the Pasteur Institute. The Pasteur Institute transferred licensing rights on nine patent families, including several based on his own research. Cellectis' work is focused on developing immunotherapies to target and eradicate cancers. These are based on custom engineered CAR-T-cells (UCART), whose properties can be determined by genetic modification. The company's mission is to develop a new generation of cancer therapies based on these engineered T-cells. Choulika has been a strong proponent of gene editing technologies as a concept that would survive the 21st century.

In 2014, Cellectis entered into 2 strategic partnerships with Pfizer and Servier for collaboration on their cancer immunotherapy products. In 2018, Allogene assumed the global strategic partnership from Pfizer that was originally agreed upon in 2014. Both Servier and Allogene continue to work on UCART19 in patients with acute lymphoblastic leukemia (ALL).

Cellectis also has research alliances with a number of hospitals for their UCART clinical trials – among the first being Weill Cornell Medical College and the MD Anderson Cancer Center at the University of Texas.

An agricultural biotechnology subsidiary, Calyxt, Inc. (formerly Cellectis Plant Sciences, Inc.), was founded in 2010. Its work includes the development of High-Oleic Soybean Oil and High Fiber Wheat with reduced gluten content.

André Choulika was a member of the Supervisory Board of Viroxis SA and was a member of the Investment Committee of G1J Ile-de-France. He was a Council member of ARIIS (the Health Industry Alliance for Research and Innovation), a board member for EuropaBio on emerging businesses, and a member of the scientific advisory program Biofutur. He was also the president of France Biotech (the French association of biotechnology companies) from 2009 to 2014. In 2013, he was appointed project manager of France's "medical biotechnology" program, one of 34 launched by Arnaud Montebourg, Minister of Industrial Renewal of France. In 2019, Dr. Choulika was also appointed to the Board of Directors for the Institut Pasteur for his business expertise.

== Awards and recognition ==
- 1999: Cellectis wins the Emerging Business category in a national competition for the creation of innovative technology companies, launched by Claude Allegre
- 2015: Cellectis named Company of the Year, European MedScience Awards
- 2016: Cellectis wins Most Innovative European Biotech SME in Healthcare, EuropaBio Awards
- 2016: Cellectis named as one of MIT Technology Review's 50 Smartest Companies

== Personal life ==
André Choulika has three children. He cites cycling, skiing and collecting modern art as hobbies.

== Selected publications ==
- "I-SceI meganuclease mediates highly efficient transgenesis in fish.
- LagoZ and LagZ, two genes derived from the LacZ gene to study epigenetics.
- I-SceI-induced gene replacement at a natural locus in embryonic stem cells.
- Induction of homologous recombination in mammalian chromosomes by using the I-SceI system of Saccharomyces cerevisiae.

== Selected patents ==
US Patent Number	Title	Year
8,476,072	Meganuclease recombination system	2013
8,921,332	Chromosomal modification involving the induction of double-stranded DNA cleavage and homologous recombination at the cleavage site	2014
8,206,965	Hybrid and single chain meganucleases and use thereof	2012
9,365,864	Meganuclease recombination system	2016
7,960,525	Gene repair involving in vivo excision of targeting DNA	2011
7,842,489	Use of meganucleases for inducing homologous recombination ex vivo and in toto in vertebrate somatic tissues and application thereof	2010
