= Lenny Trčková =

Czech presenter (born 1978)

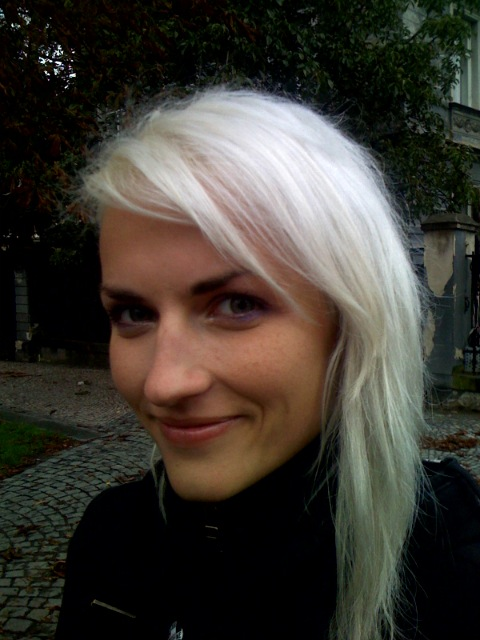
- Born: 5 August 1978 (age 47); Slavičín, Czechoslovakia
- Occupations: Radio presenter; TV presenter

Lenny Trčková (born August 5, 1978) is a Czech radio presenter, TV presenter and model. She lives in Prague.

She hosts Host Óčka ("Ocko's guest") and Inbox TV shows on Czech music channel Óčko. She also hosts I.D. and Ranní kuropění - Wake up call shows on Czech Radio station ČRo 4 Radio Wave.

== Biography ==
Trčková was born in Slavičín, Czechoslovakia (now Czech Republic), where she also studied in and graduated from secondary school, with a major in economics. Trčková worked in many areas of economics until 2001. During that time, she was also interested in cultural and musical events, helping to run a movie theatre and co-founding a local music festival named Festiválek.

In 1999, Trčková moved to Prague and began working as a radio presenter and TV presenter. She worked with radio stations including Frekvence 1 (Na titulní straně), Fajn Radio (Fajn ráno), Express radio (D'rano) and on TV Praha (Maestro) and Czech Television (Styl).

Later, she started to host movie premieres and special events, including Elite Model Look, Hairdresser of the year, Diesel party, and Fashion show of Klára Nademlýnská.

== Personal life ==
Trčková's hobbies are music, singing, books, horse riding, design and fashion.
