= Tomáš Polách =

Czech footballer

Personal information
- Date of birth: 16 January 1977 (age 49)
- Place of birth: Slavičín, Czechoslovakia
- Height: 1.74 m (5 ft 9 in)
- Position: Midfielder

Team information
- Current team: Pardubice (assistant)

Youth career
- 1983–1992: FK Brumov
- 1992–1994: Baník Ostrava
- 1994–1997: FK Brumov

Senior career*
Years	Team	Apps	(Gls)
1997–2000	Dubnica	51	(5)
2000–2006	Slovácko	155	(12)
2006–2010	Brno	113	(11)
2011	→ Dubnica (loan)	15	(2)
2011–2013	Fastav Zlín	19	(1)
2014	→ Opava (loan)		
2014–2015	Slovan Broumov		
2015–2018	Hodonín		
2019	SCU Poysbrunn/Falkenstein		

Managerial career
- 2018: Hodonín (player-manager)
- 2018: Vyškov (assistant)
- 2019–2023: Zbrojovka Brno U19
- 2023: Zbrojovka Brno (assistant)
- 2023–2024: Zbrojovka Brno
- 2025: Slovácko (assistant)
- 2025: FC Strání
- 2025–: Pardubice (assistant)
- * Club domestic league appearances and goals

Tomáš Polách (born 16 January 1977 in Slavičín) is a Czech football midfielder. He retired from professional football in 2014. He played for most of his career in Slovácko and Zbrojovka Brno.

On 14 November 2023, Polách was appointed as the manager of Zbrojovka Brno, signing a two-year contract with option.

On 2 January 2025, Polách was appointed as an assistant coach of Slovácko.

On 4 April 2025, Polách was appointed as the manager of FC Strání.

On 14 October 2025, Polách was appointed as an assistant coach of Pardubice.
