= Robert Courrier =

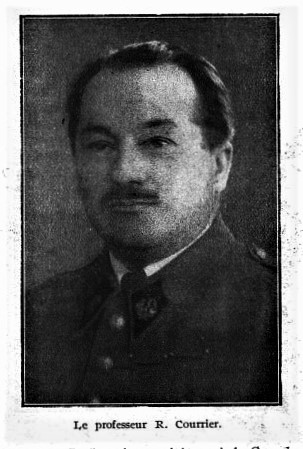
French biologist and Doctor, Robert Courrier

Marie Jules Constant Robert Courrier ForMemRS (6 October 1895 – 13 March 1986) was a French biologist, and doctor. He was a secretary of the French Academy of Sciences from 1948 to 1986. He was the winner of 1963 CNRS Gold medal, the highest scientific research award in France.

== Life ==
He graduated from University of Strasbourg School of Medicine with an MD in 1924, and University of Algiers with a PhD in Natural Sciences in 1927.
