= Harriett Ephrussi-Taylor =

American scientist

- Born: Harriett Elizabeth Taylor; April 10, 1918; Belmar, New Jersey, U.S.
- Died: March 30, 1968 (aged 49); France
- Education: Radcliffe College; University of California, Los Angeles
- Spouse: Boris Ephrussi (m. 1949)
- Children: Anne Ephrussi
- Father: Albert H. Taylor
- Scientific career
- Fields: Genetics, microbiology

Harriett Elizabeth Ephrussi-Taylor (April 10, 1918 – March 30, 1968) was an American geneticist, microbiologist and educator, who initiated and made crucial contributions to the fields of transformation and bacterial recombination.

== Biography ==
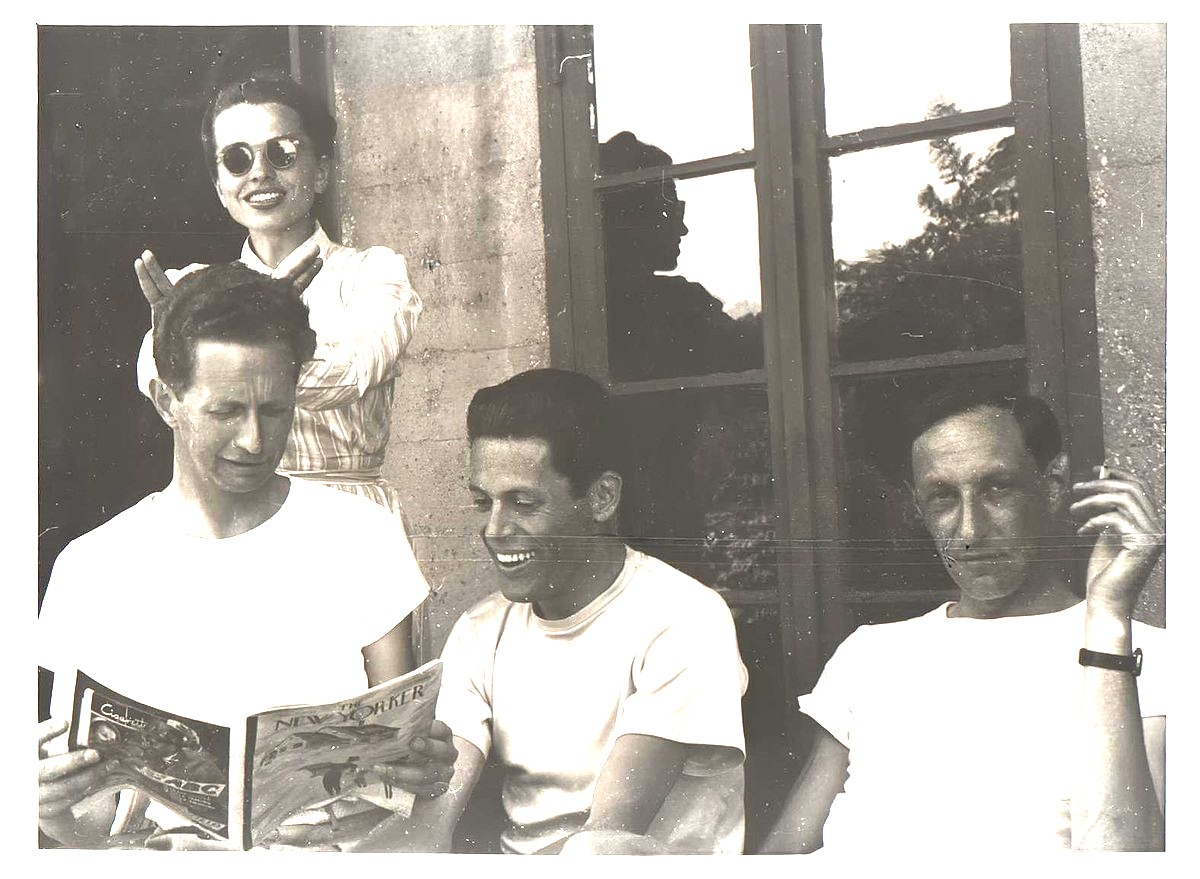
From left to right- Harriet Taylor, Audre Luoff, Jacques Monod, Boris Ephrussi with an issue of the New Yorker at the Cold Spring Harbor Symposium.

Born in Belmar, New Jersey, Harriett Taylor grew up and attended secondary school in Washington, D.C. Following her interest in the natural sciences, she pursued her undergraduate studies at Radcliffe College in Cambridge, Massachusetts, which she completed cum laude in 1938. She then moved to the University of California, Los Angeles, where she studied zoology and obtained her master's degree in 1942. During her doctoral studies in the laboratory of L. C. Dunn at Columbia University in New York, she investigated genetic mechanisms underlying the growth kinetics of yeast cultures and earned her PhD in 1945.

In 1945 she joined the laboratory of Oswald Avery at the Rockefeller Institute for Medical Research, where she began building a collection of mutant bacteria Streptococcus pneumoniae (pneumococcus) deficient in their ability to synthesize the cell wall. In her later studies, she identified that bacterial phenotypes are due to independent factors in the bacterial genome and factors in transforming DNA.

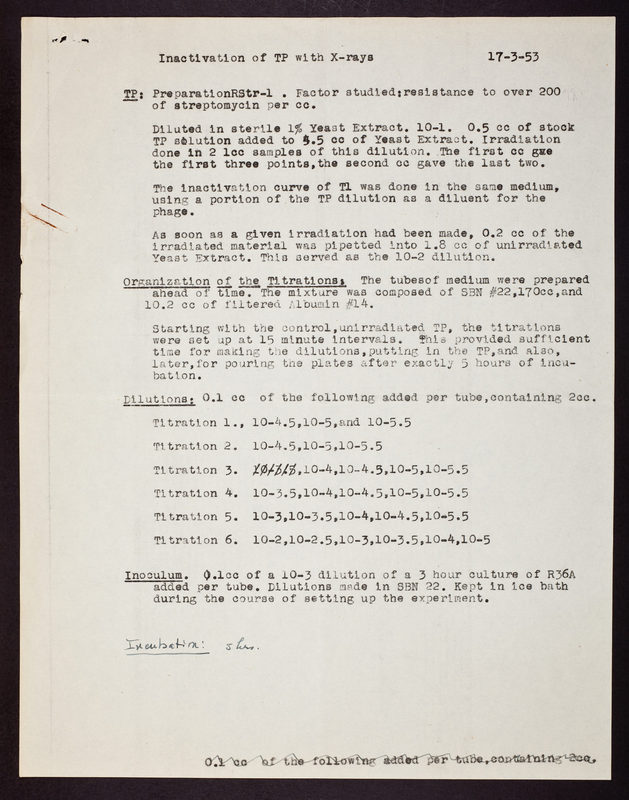
Experimental protocol to "Inactivate TP with X-Rays" shared by Harriett Ephrussi Taylor with James Watson

In 1947 Harriett started working with Boris Ephrussi, her future husband, in Paris before they moved to the French National Centre for Scientific Research in Gif-sur-Yvette in 1952. Between 1962 and 1967, the Ephrussis moved for a research stay to Cleveland.

In 1968, shortly after her return to France, Ephrussi-Taylor died after a short but serious illness at the peak of her scientific career.

== Research ==
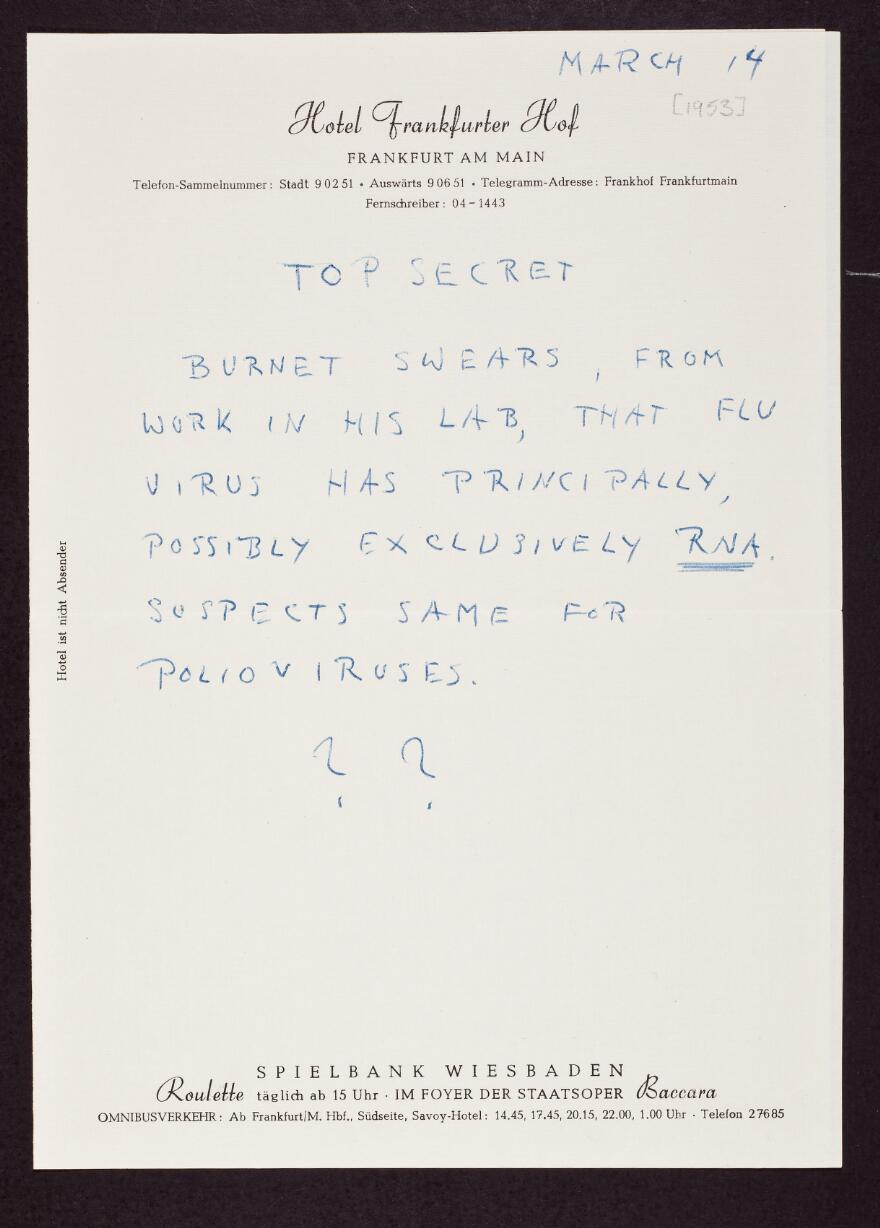
Sharing the latest findings from Macfarlane Burnet - the flu virus might contain exclusively RNA

Ephrussi-Taylor investigated bacterial transformation at the stage of DNA recombination during which donor DNA inserts into the genome of the recipient bacterium. She established quantitative methods and contributed seminal work for the understanding of the genetic and molecular basis of transformation. They demonstrated the dependence of transformation on the size of transforming DNA and that mutations could be chemically induced in DNA in vitro.

Ephrussi-Taylor collaborated and corresponded frequently with James Watson and Maurice Wilkins generating scientific hypothesis, sharing experimental protocols, discussing data interpretation and exchanging the latest findings from other researchers such as Macfarlane Burnet.

== Personal life ==
Her father was Albert H. Taylor. In 1949, Harriett married Boris Ephrussi. Her daughter, Anne Ephrussi, was born in 1955.

== Honors and awards ==
In 1964, Ephrussi-Taylor was elected member of American Academy of Arts and Sciences.
