= Margaret Buckingham =

French-British biologist

Margaret Buckingham ForMemRS
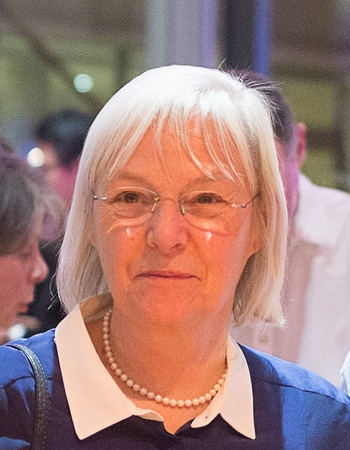
- Born: 2 March 1945 (age 81); UK
- Citizenship: dual French-British
- Education: Lady Margaret Hall, Oxford
- Website: https://www.pasteur.fr/en/developmental-and-stem-cell-biology

Margaret Buckingham, ForMemRS (born 2 March 1945) is a French-British developmental biologist working in the fields of myogenesis and cardiogenesis. She is an honorary professor at the Pasteur Institute in Paris and emeritus director in the Centre national de la recherche scientifique (CNRS). She is a member of the European Molecular Biology Organization, the Academia Europaea and the French Academy of Sciences.

== Biography ==
Margaret Buckingham was educated in Scotland and at Oxford University where she obtained B.A., M.A. and D.Phil. degrees in Biochemistry. As a postdoc, she then joined François Gros at the Pasteur Institute in Paris where she subsequently pursued her scientific career. She is an honorary professor at the Pasteur Institute and emeritus director in the Centre national de la recherche scientifique (CNRS). She is a member of the scientific council of the ERC and chairs the prize committee of the Lefoulon-Delalande Foundation for cardiovascular research. In 2013, she was awarded the gold medal of the CNRS. She is a member of the French Academy of sciences, a Fellow of the Royal Society of London/Edinburgh and an International member of the National Academy of Sciences USA. She is also a member of EMBO and of the Academia Europaea. She was a member of the scientific council of the ERC from 2016–2022. In addition to chairing the prize committee of the Lefoulon-Delalande Foundation, she also chairs the Pasteur Institute Ethics committee. She is currently a member of the scientific commission of the Institut Curie in Paris and of the scientific advisory board of the Human Developmental Biology Initiative in the UK.

She has French and British nationality, and is married to Richard Buckingham (Editor-in-Chief of Biochimie, until December 2020), with three children.

== Scientific research ==
Margaret Buckingham is a developmental biologist who is interested in how naïve multipotent cells acquire tissue specificity during embryogenesis. She has studied both the formation of skeletal muscle and of the heart, using the tools of mouse molecular genetics to characterise cell behaviour and to identify the genes that govern cell fate choices.

From pioneering research on the in vivo expression, structure and regulation of muscle genes, she and her lab went on to study the myogenic regulatory factors, showing that Myf5 is present before MyoD in the embryo and that in the absence of Myf5 and Mrf4, cells fail to form skeletal muscle and acquire other mesodermal cell fates. Characterisation of Myf5 enhancers revealed a direct role for Pax3 in their transcriptional activation at different sites of myogenesis. From genetic screens, they identified other Pax3 targets, demonstrating the central role of Pax3 in the gene regulatory network that leads to the onset of myogenesis in the embryo. They discovered a population of Pax3/Pax7-positive progenitors that are essential for foetal muscle development and showed that Pax-positive satellite cells associated with adult fibres constitute stem cells for muscle regeneration. They identified genes, including Pitx2/3, that affect the behaviour of these cells and showed that Myf5 mRNA, present in quiescent satellite cells is sequestered until these cells are activated after injury.

Her main contribution to cardiogenesis is the identification of the second heart field (SHF) as a major source of cardiac progenitor cells that form specific regions of the heart. The behaviour of these cells is controlled by gene regulatory networks and signalling pathways, exemplified by the FGF10 gene. Retrospective clonal analysis complemented their work on the SHF and established a lineage tree for the myocardium, where the second lineage defines the SHF contribution whereas the first lineage contributes all the left ventricular myocardium. This analysis revealed the clonal relationships between different sublineages that contribute to both cardiac muscle at the poles of the heart and anterior skeletal muscles which are not under Pax3-control. In addition to its conceptual importance for cardiogenesis, this work also has biomedical implications for congenital heart malformations.

== Awards and honours ==
- Member of the European Molecular Biology Organisation (EMBO), 1979
- Prix Jaffé of the Académie des sciences, 1990
- Member of the Academia Europaea, 1998
- CNRS Silver Medal, 1999
- Chevalier de la Légion d'Honneur, 2002
- Officier de l'Ordre National du Mérite, 2008
- Lifetime Achievement Award of the American Society for Developmental Biology, 2010
- Officier de la Légion d'honneur, 2011
- International member of the National Academy of Sciences USA, 2011
- Fellow of the Royal Society, 2013
- CNRS Gold Medal, 2013
- Commandeur de Ordre National du Mérite, 2013
- Honorary Fellow of the Royal Society of Edinburgh, 2014
- Commandeure de la Légion d'Honneur, 2018
- Grand Officier of the Légion d’Honneur, 2023
