= Patrick Sung =

American professor of structural biology

Patrick Sung is an American professor of structural biology and biochemistry at the University of Texas Health Science Center at San Antonio. He is known for his work on DNA repair.

== Biography ==
Sung was born on May 24, 1959, in Hong Kong. In 1981, he got his Bachelor of Science degree from the University of Liverpool and four years later got his Ph.D. from Oxford University. From 1993 to 1997 he was an assistant professor at the University of Texas Medical Branch and from that year till 2001 served as an associate professor of the University of Texas Health Science Center at San Antonio where he also became chairman of its graduate program and even became a professor of its Department of Molecular Medicine. In 2000 Sung became an editor of the Molecular and Cellular Biology and in 2003 was an associate editor of the Genes to Cells journal. The same year he became professor at both Therapeutic Radiology and Molecular Biophysics and Biochemistry departments of Yale University and from that year till 2005 served at the Genes & Developments' editorial board. From 2003 till 2004 he was Special Emphasis Panels' member.

== Personal life ==
In 1984 he was married to Ines Cuadrado.
