= Slavičín =

- Town
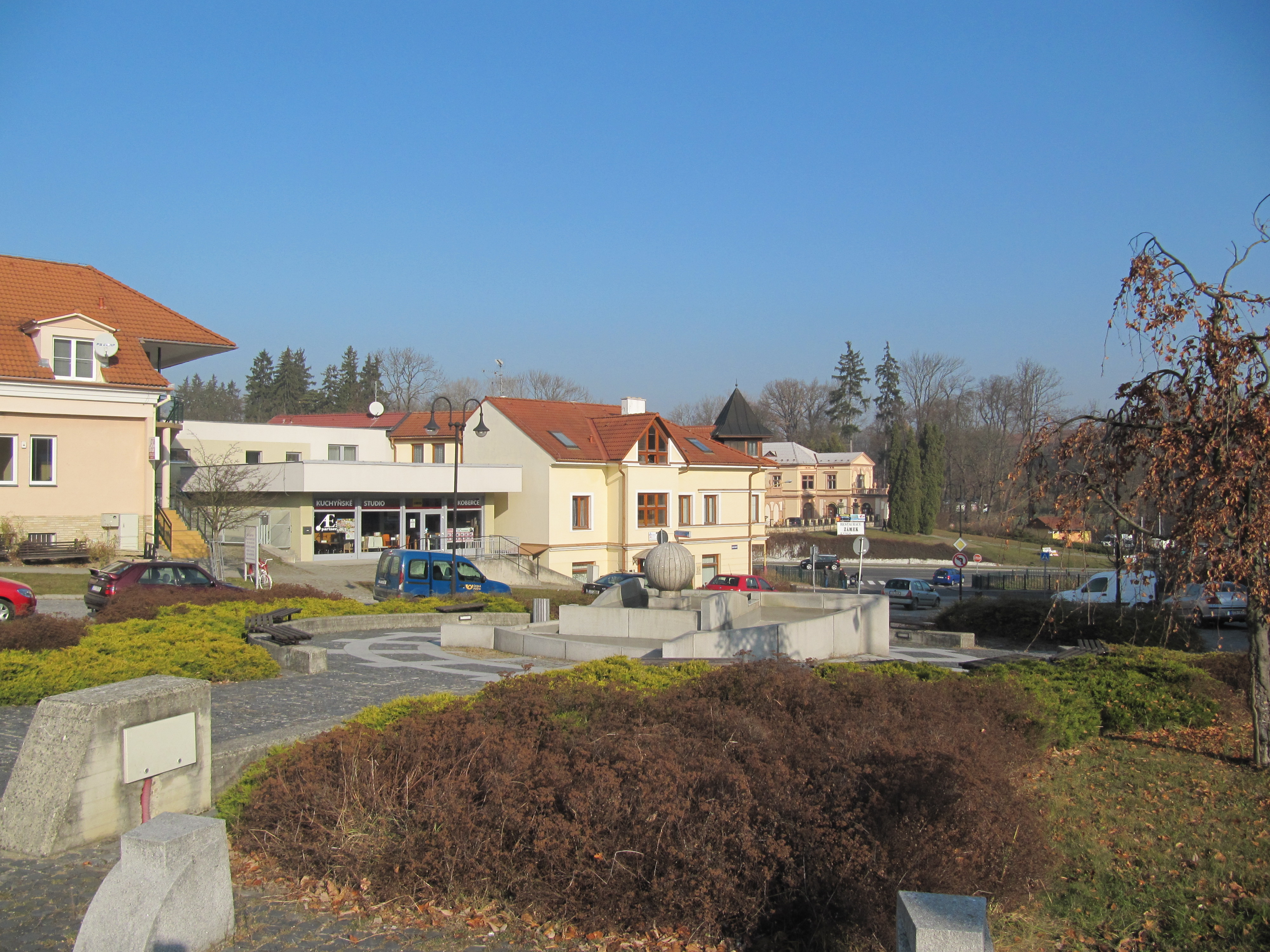
- The square Horní náměstí

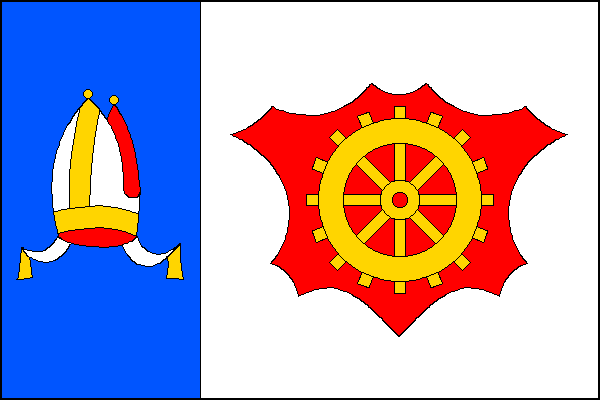
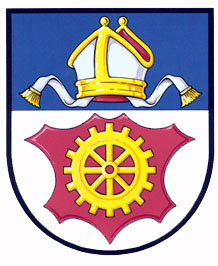
- Flag Coat of arms

- Location in the Czech Republic
- Coordinates: 49°5′17″N 17°52′25″E
- Country: Czech Republic
- Region: Zlín
- District: Zlín
- First mentioned: 1141

Government
  - Mayor: Jan Jordán

Area
  - Total: 33.61 km^{2} (12.98 sq mi)
- Elevation: 350 m (1,150 ft)

Population (2026-01-01)
  - Total: 6,168
  - Density: 183.5/km^{2} (475.3/sq mi)
- Time zone: UTC+1 (CET)
  - Summer (DST): UTC+2 (CEST)
- Postal code: 763 21
- Website: www.mesto-slavicin.cz

Slavičín (Czech pronunciation: [ˈslavɪtʃiːn]) is a town in Zlín District in the Zlín Region of the Czech Republic. It has about 6,200 inhabitants. The town is located on the Říka Stream in the Vizovice Highlands. For centuries, it was an agricultural village, which only became a town in 1964.

== Administrative division ==
Slavičín consists of four municipal parts (in brackets population according to the 2021 census):

- Slavičín (4,560)
- Divnice (287)
- Hrádek na Vlárské dráze (729)
- Nevšová (460)

== Etymology ==
There are several theories about the origin of the name. The name could be derived from the Czech word slavík (i.e. 'nightingale'), or there may be a connection with the Slavník dynasty. According to local legend, the name is derived from slavný čin (meaning 'glorious deed').

== Geography ==
Slavičín is located about 24 kilometres (15 mi) southeast of Zlín. It lies in the Vizovice Highlands. The highest point is at 532 m (1,745 ft) above sea level. The Říka Stream flows through the town. The entire municipal territory lies within the Bílé Karpaty Protected Landscape Area.

== History ==
The first written mention of Slavičín is in a deed of Bishop Jindřich Zdík from 1141. For centuries, it was mostly an agricultural village where the craft did not flourish much. In 1860, a tannery was founded here, which was later expanded by a shoe factory. In 1936, an engineering company was established and Slavičín became an industrial village. After World War II Slavičín further expanded, and in 1964 it became a town.

== Demographics ==
Historical population

Year	Pop.	±%
1869	2,365	—
1880	2,378	+0.5%
1890	2,450	+3.0%
1900	2,606	+6.4%
1910	2,797	+7.3%

Year	Pop.	±%
1921	2,608	−6.8%
1930	2,837	+8.8%
1950	3,033	+6.9%
1961	4,503	+48.5%
1970	5,478	+21.7%

Year	Pop.	±%
1980	7,016	+28.1%
1991	7,197	+2.6%
2001	7,159	−0.5%
2011	6,611	−7.7%
2021	6,036	−8.7%

Source: Censuses

== Transport ==
Slavičín is located on the railway line Bylnice–Bojkovice.

== Sights ==
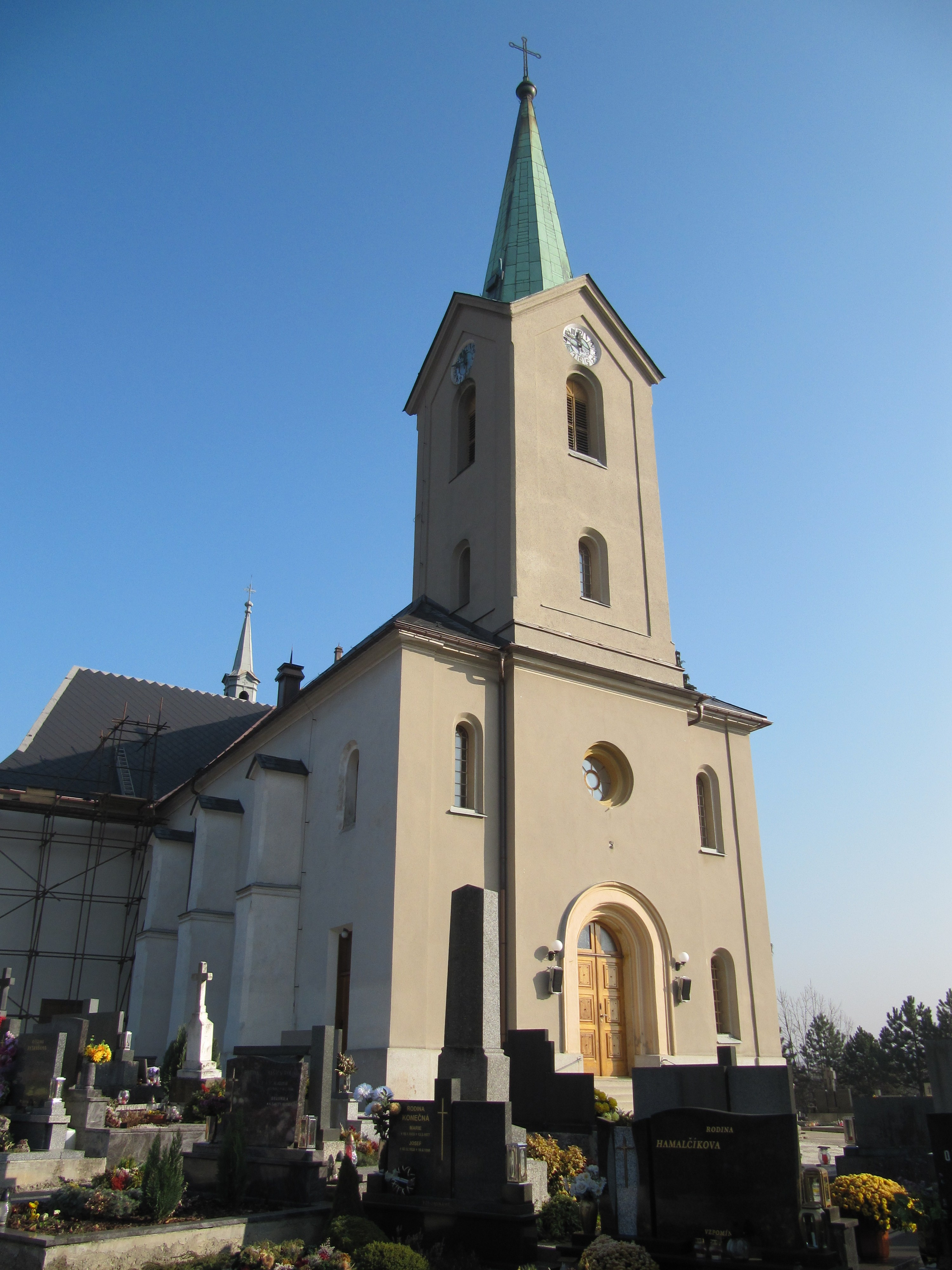
Church of Saint Adalbert

The Church of Saint Adalbert is the oldest building in the town. The original church was from the 13th century. After it was destroyed by a fire, this cemetery church completely rebuilt in the Baroque style in 1897.

The Slavičín Castle was built in the Baroque style in 1750. Today it serves as a restaurant.

== Notable people ==
- Lumír Krejčí (born 1972), biochemist
- Tomáš Řepka (born 1974), footballer
- Tomáš Polách (born 1977), footballer
- Lenny Trčková (born 1978), presenter and model
- Petra Polášková (born 1979), footballer
- Stanislav Polčák (born 1980), politician
- Aleš Urbánek (born 1980), footballer
- Zdeněk Hřib (born 1981), politician, Mayor of Prague

== Twin towns – sister cities ==
Slavičín is twinned with:

- Horná Súča, Slovakia
- Horné Srnie, Slovakia
- Nová Dubnica, Slovakia
- Uhrovec, Slovakia
