= France Biotech =

Trade association of biotechnology companies in France

France Biotech is the French trade association of biotechnology companies. It was created in 1997 by a group of French biotechnology entrepreneurs, among whom was its first president Pascal Brandys.

France Biotech’s primary mission is to support the development of this industry in France, by improving the tax, legal, regulatory and managerial environment in which these companies operate and by advocating for their recognition as a leading-edge industry. France Biotech also aims to turn French innovative health technologies into world leaders. The organization, which championed the creation of the French Young Innovative Company (JEI) status in 2004, develops a wide range of actions intended to set the innovative health sector on an independent and high-performance course.

France Biotech is today chaired by Frédéric Girard.
