= Éric Karsenti =

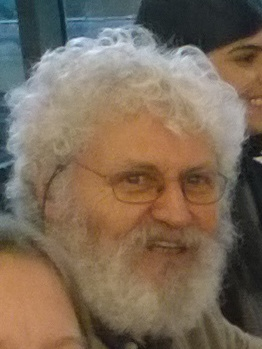
- Born: 10 September 1948 (age 77); Paris, France
- Education: Pasteur Institute
- Known for: Tara Oceans expedition Cell cycle research
- Awards: CNRS Gold Medal (2015); Member of the French Academy of Sciences (2017)
- Scientific career
- Fields: Cell biology, biophysics, oceanography
- Workplaces: CNRS; EMBL; Pasteur Institute

Éric Karsenti (pronounced [eʁik kaʁsɑ̃ti]; born 10 September 1948 in Paris) is a French biologist. Research Director at the CNRS, he was the scientific director of the Tara Oceans expedition.

== Biography ==
After a thesis at the Pasteur Institute (1979), he worked as a researcher on the molecular mechanisms that govern the cell cycle. He created the Department of Cellular Biology and Biophysics of the European Molecular Biology Laboratory (EMBL).

As the main scientist on the Tara Oceans expedition, he collected plankton samples from many parts of the oceans to conduct an important genomic analysis of plankton diversity.

He is a recipient of the CNRS gold medal and was elected a member of the Académie des Sciences in 2017 (after having been a correspondent since 1999).
