= Genoscope =

French biological research institute

Coordinates: 48°37′24″N 2°26′22″E

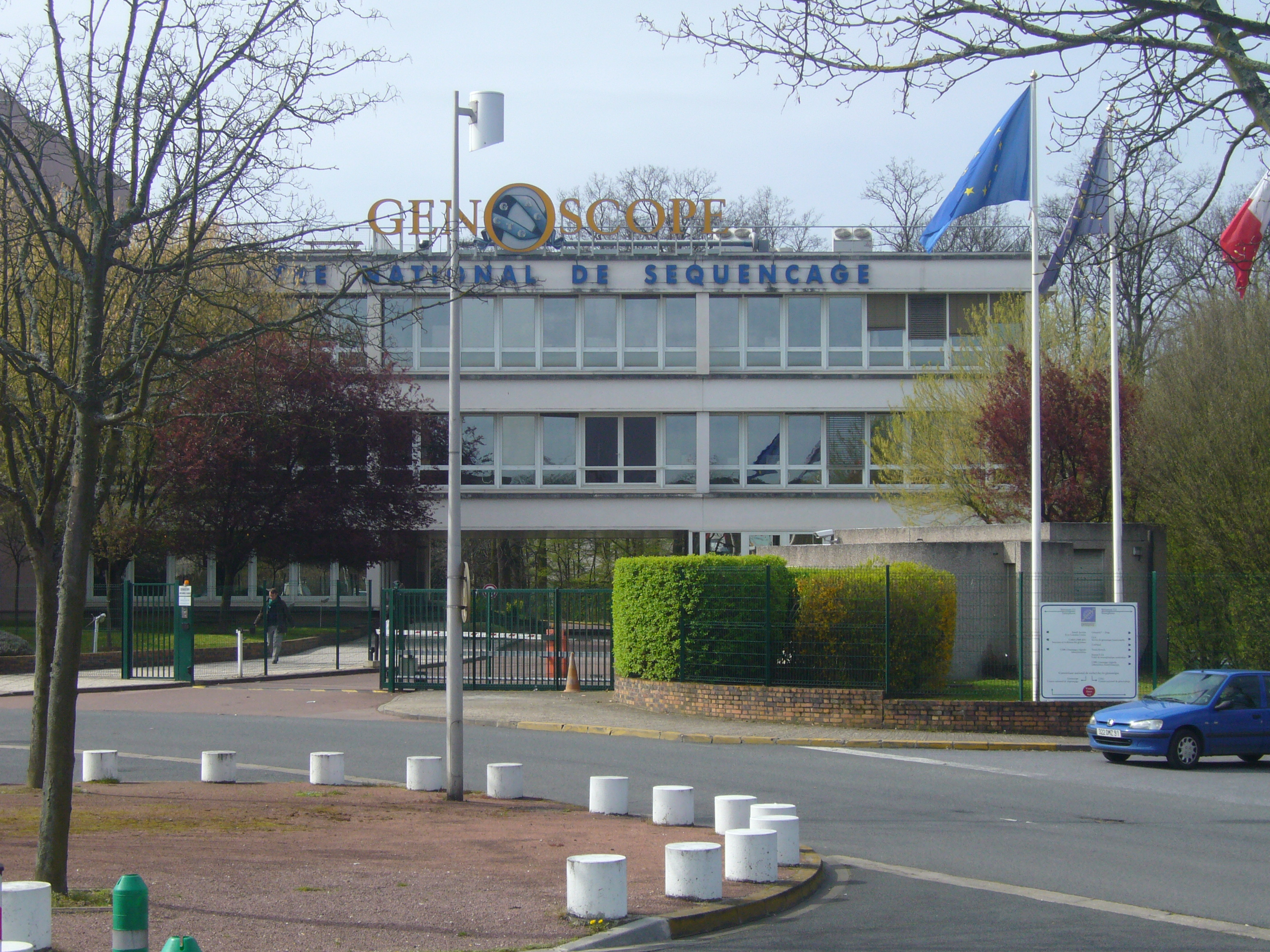
- Established: 1996
- Field of research: Genomics
- Director: Jean Weissenbach
- Location: Évry, France
- Website: www.genoscope.cns.fr

The French National Sequencing Center (Genoscope) was created in 1996 in Évry, France. It has been involved in the sequencing of the human genome.

== Details ==
The Genoscope is a part of the Commissariat à l'énergie atomique et aux énergies alternatives (CEA); more specifically the CEA Paris-Saclay center. The site employs around 130 people.

== See also ==
- CEA Paris-Saclay
