= Robert Chambers (biologist) =

American biologist

Robert Chambers (23 October 1881 in Erzerum– 22 July 1957) was an American biologist, inventor of instruments to dissect living cells. Chambers was president of the American Society of Zoologists, president of Harvey Society, and president of the Union of American Biological Sciences. He was also chief of Laboratory of Experimental Cell Research at the Marine Biological Laboratory. Chambers received his Ph.D. from the Ludwig-Maximilians-Universität München in Germany.
