= Évariste Sanchez-Palencia =

Évariste Sanchez-Palencia (born 1941 in Madrid), is a French researcher in theoretical mechanics, applied mathematics and epistemology, Emeritus Research Director at the CNRS. He is a member of the French Academy of Sciences since 12 November 2001. He is also a member of the board of the union rationalist.

== Distinction and prizes ==
- 1981, CNRS Silver Medal (Physics for Engineers)
- 1987, Elected Corresponding Member of the French Academy of Sciences (Division of Mechanical Sciences).
- 1995, Award French Institute of Petroleum, awarded by the French Academy of Sciences.
- 2001, elected Full Member of the French Academy of Sciences.

== Bibliography ==
=== In mechanics and mathematics ===
- Non homogeneous media and vibration theory, "Lecture notes in Physics" 127, Springer, Berlin, 398 pages, 1980; translated in Russian, MIR 1984.”
- with D. Leguillon, Computation of singular solutions in elliptic problems and elasticity, Éditions Masson - John Wiley, Paris - New York, 200 pages, 1987
- with J. Sanchez-Hubert, Vibration and coupling of continuous systems. Asymptotic methods, Springer, Berlin, 421 pages, 1989
- with J. Sanchez-Hubert, Introduction aux méthodes asymptotiques et à l'homogénéisation. Application à la Mécanique des milieux continus, Éditions Masson, Paris (pour la Maîtrise, dirigée par P. G. Paris (1992), 266 pages
- with Sanchez-Hubert, Coques élastiques minces: Propriétés asymptotiques, Éditions Masson, Paris,. (1997), 376 pages.
- with O. Millet and F. Béchet Singular problems in shell theory. Computing and asymptotics, Springer, Berlin, Heidelberg, 265 pages (2010)

=== In epistemology and history of sciences ===
- Dialectic walk in the sciences, KDP, August 2023, ISBN 979-8857033609, 454 pages: translated from the original in French Promenade dialectique dans les sciences, Hermann 2012. (ISBN 978-2705682729); translated in Spanish, Ed.Univ.Cantabria 2015; translated in Italian, UNICOPLI 2018.
- Several contributions in Science et culture. Repéres pour une culture scientifique commune Edited by J. Haissinski and H. Langevin-Joliot, Apogée/Espace des sciences, Rennes (2015)

=== In epistemology and dynamical systems ===
- Dialectique dans les sciences et systèmes dynamiques, with Jean-Pierre Françoise, Le Temps des Cerises (publishers), Essais Scientifiques, 240 pages, January 2023, ISBN 9782370712592.

== Main research topics ==
(1970-1985) Homogenization method for continuous media with fine structure. (1985-2010) Asymptotic study and numerical computation of very thin elastic shells. (From 2005) epistemology, along the axes: -Essentially approximate nature and evolution of scientific knowledge. -Dynamical systems theory provides an intelligible basis to dialectic movement of nature (dynamic interaction, constructive aspects of evolution, etc.)
