= Genset Corporation =

Genset
- Industry: biotechnology
- Founded: 1989
- Successor: Serono
- Headquarters: Paris, France

Genset, a biotechnology company, was established in 1989 in Paris, France with Pascal Brandys as its first president.

The company was listed on the NASDAQ and the Paris Bourse.

== History ==
Genset was listed on the NASDAQ and the Paris Bourse (now NYSE Euronext) in 1996. Genset rapidly became the European flagship company in the field of genomics and became the second-largest biotechnology company in Europe in 1999. At that time, the company reported identifiable assets of EUR 80.9 million and had subsidiaries in the United States, Japan, Singapore, and Australia. Genset was a pioneer in private human genome research. In 1994, Genset started the first large scale program to analyze the regulatory sequences of the human genome and in 1997 also initiated the construction of a map of single nucleotide polymorphisms as a tool to accelerate the discovery of genes associated with diseases. The company also created the business model of pharmacogenomics and started the first pharmacogenomics research program in the world in collaboration with Abbott Laboratories in 1997.

After 2000 Genset changed its strategy to focus on drug development, leading to the departure of its president and other founders. The strategy shift proved unsuccessful and Genset was acquired by Serono of Switzerland in 2002, now part of Merck Serono as Merck launched a takeover bid for Serono in 2006.
