= Piotr Słonimski =

Polish-born French geneticist

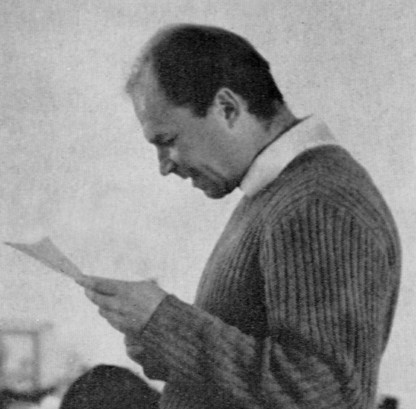
- Piotr Słominski
- Born: November 9, 1922; Warsaw, Poland
- Died: April 25, 2009 (aged 86); Paris, France
- Education: Jagiellonian University; Sorbonne University
- Known for: Work on mitochondrial genetics
- Relatives: Antoni Słonimski (uncle)
- Awards: Mendel Medal (1989); CNRS Gold medal (1985)
- Scientific career
- Fields: Genetics
- Institutions: CNRS
- Doctoral advisor: Boris Ephrussi

Piotr Słonimski (November 9, 1922, in Warsaw – April 25, 2009, in Paris) was a Polish-born French geneticist, pioneer of yeast mitochondrial genetics, nephew of the Polish poet Antoni Słonimski.

== Biography ==
Słonimski was born in Warsaw in 1922 and he finished "underground" studies of medicine during World War II in occupied Poland. He was a member of the Polish resistance movement and the Armia Krajowa, and he fought during the Warsaw Uprising. According to his own account, he became interested with genetics when he discovered, among ruins of a German police station and while performing an act of sabotage, a German book on the experiments of George Wells Beadle and Boris Ephrussi.

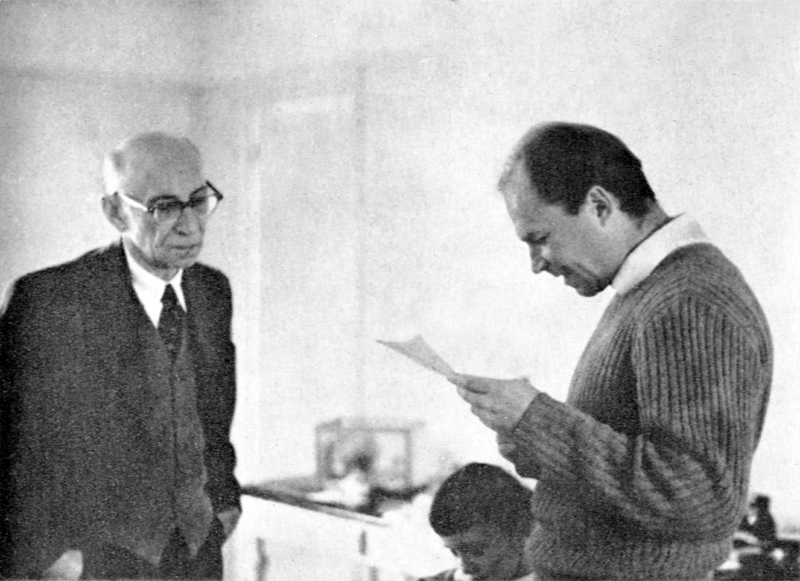
Antoni Słonimski and Piotr Słonimski

After the war, he finished medical studies at the Jagiellonian University in Kraków. In 1947, Słonimski emigrated and settled in France, as members of Armia Krajowa were prosecuted by the newly established communist government in Poland. Once in Paris, he joined the group of Boris Ephrussi at Sorbonne University and started working in the field of genetics. In 1952 he obtained his Ph.D.

Between 1971 and 1991, Słonimski was the director of Centre de Génétique Moléculaire of the French CNRS in Gif-sur-Yvette.

Słonimski never broke the contacts with his home country, Poland. Since 1980, he was heading the Solidarité France-Pologne, organizing aid for Poland. He frequently hosted Polish intelectualists and dissidents, such as Adam Michnik, Tadeusz Mazowiecki, Maria and Leszek Kołakowski. When martial law was introduced in Poland in 1981, he organized financial support for scientists repressed by the government. The money was smuggled and distributed in Poland by two Polish couriers: Wacław Gajewski, a professor of genetics, and Władysław Kunicki-Goldfinger, a professor of microbiology. Słonimski gave them the code names "Eukaryote" and "Prokaryote", as Gajewski was working on fungi, and Kunicki-Goldfinger was a microbiologist.

== Scientific achievements ==
Piotr Słonimski did pioneering work on yeast mitochondrial genetics. He was one of the first to show that genetic information is passed outside of the nucleus in mitochondria, and his subsequent, much cited work led to establishment of the field of mitochondrial genomics. In 1980, he discovered that some parts of the introns in yeast mitochondria encode an enzyme—which he called a maturase—that aids the splicing and the maturation of mRNA.

== Awards ==
- CNRS Gold medal received in 1985
- Mendel Medal (1989)
- Commander's Cross with Star Order of Polonia Restituta, one of the highest Polish Orders (2009)
- Doctor honoris causa of the universities in Louvain-la-Neuve, Warsaw and Wrocław
