= Cellectis =

French biopharmaceutical company

- Company type: Société Anonyme
- Traded as: Euronext Paris: ACLS; Euronext Growth; Nasdaq: CLLS (ADR)
- ISIN: FR0010425595
- Industry: Biotechnology, genome engineering, oncology
- Founded: 1999
- Headquarters: Paris XIIIème (France)
- Key people: André Choulika (CEO)
- Products: Engineered CAR T-cells; TALEN technology
- Website: cellectis.com

Cellectis is a French biopharmaceutical company. It develops genome-edited chimeric antigen receptor T-cell technologies for cancer immunotherapy. It has offices in Paris, New York City, and Raleigh, North Carolina.

== History ==
Cellectis was founded by André Choulika in 1999. It built up a successful business based on the use of Meganuclease in genome engineering. Cellectis became a publicly traded company in 2007, and raised €21.2 million in a stock offering on Euronext. In 2010, it acquired Cyto Pulse, which had developed a new electroporation technology, and in 2011 it paid €28 million for Cellartis, a Swedish biotechnology company. In January 2011 the company licensed TALEN gene-editing technology from Iowa State University and the University of Minnesota. The company employed nearly 300 people in early 2014.

With the advent of the CRISPR (clustered regularly interspaced short palindromic repeat) genome editing technique, the Cellectis meganuclease technology became uneconomic, and by 2013 the company was close to bankruptcy. It restructured, closed laboratories and reduced staff, and shifted research emphasis toward CAR-T technologies for cancer immunotherapy. Early in 2014 it reached a substantial financing deal with Servier, and later in the same year made a much larger agreement with Pfizer and Allogene.

In March 2015 the company raised $228 million through a stock offering on NASDAQ. The shares fell by 15% in the first week of trading.

Cellectis has two manufacturing facilities - one in Paris, France, and one in Raleigh, North Carolina.

=== Calyxt ===
Cellectis formed the subsidiary of Calyxt in 2010 to develop healthier food ingredients through gene editing. Based in Roseville, Minnesota, the subsidiary filed for an IPO in June, 2017.

=== CAR-T cancer treatment ===
Cellectis has developed CAR T-cell treatments for blood cancer. Most CAR-T therapies under development as of 2017 involved taking T-cells from the person with cancer and applying gene therapy to those cells to activate them to attack the person's cancer; an autologous cell therapy approach. Cellectis' approach starts with T-cells taken from healthy donors (allogeneic or allograft) and modifying these base cells with gene editing to disable the gene that causes donor immune cells to attack their host (preventing graft vs host disease). The base cells can then be modified the same way other CAR-T therapeutics are.

In 2017, UCART123 was in phase 1 trials for blastic plasmacytoid dendritic cell neoplasm (BPDCN) and acute myeloid leukaemia (AML). In early September 2017, the FDA suspended Cellectis’ Phase I trials of UCART123 in the wake of the death of a BPDCN patient from cytokine release syndrome (CRS). The FDA hold was lifted in November 2017 after reducing the dosage and with additional conditions. Cellectis also has a phase 1 trial for UCART22 in B-cell acute lymphoblastic leukemia (B-ALL) and received an IND approval from the FDA on their UCARTCS1 product candidate in multiple myeloma.
