= Michel Lazdunski =

French biologist

- Born: 11 April 1938 (age 86); Marseille, France
- Education: École nationale supérieure de chimie de Clermont-Ferrand, Laval University (PhD chemistry-physics, 1962), University of Marseille (PhD biochemistry, 1964)
- Known for: Ion channels
- Awards: CNRS Silver Medal
- Scientific career
- Fields: Biochemistry
- Institutions: CNRS, Nice/Sophia Antipolis
- Doctoral advisor: Ludovic Ouellet

Michel Lazdunski (born 11 April 1938, in Marseille) is a French biologist specializing in biochemistry, physiology, pathophysiology, molecular pharmacology and neuroscience.

== Biography ==
Michel Lazdunski is a chemical engineer (1955), graduate of the École nationale supérieure de chimie de Clermont-Ferrand, PhD in Chemistry-Physics from Laval University in Quebec City (1962) in Canada in the laboratory of Ludovic Ouellet, then PhD in biochemistry (University of Marseille, 1964). He began his career at the CNRS in 1962 in Marseille where he became Professor of Biochemistry in 1965. He accepted the Chair of Biochemistry at the University of Nice in 1968. He founded the CNRS Biochemistry Centre there, which he managed until 1989, when he moved to the Sophia Antipolis science park to direct the CNRS Institute of Molecular and Cellular Pharmacology, which he had just created and which he managed until 2004. During his academic career in Nice/Sophia Antipolis, he was successively Professor of Biochemistry (Faculty of Sciences), Director of Research seconded to the CNRS and Professor of Pharmacology PU-PH (Faculty of Medicine).Michel Lazdunski was a member of the Scientific Council (1997–2001) and the Board of Directors (2001–2005) of the CNRS and the Council of the European Molecular Biology Organisation (1990–1995). He has chaired many committees including the UNECE Life Sciences Committee (Human Capital and Mobility Programme 1996–1997) and the National Coordinating Committee for Life Sciences (2001–2002).

He was elected a full member of the French Academy of sciences in 1991. He was appointed senior member of the Institut universitaire de France in 1991 for a five-year term, renewed in 1996.

== Scientific contribution ==
The first part of Michel Lazdunski's scientific career (awarded the CNRS Silver Medal) was devoted to enzymology. He then focused on exploring the molecular machines, the ion channels, that generate bioelectricity in the brain, peripheral nervous system, heart, muscles, vessels and hormone-secreting endocrine systems and are responsible for multiple pathologies. He played a pioneering role in the analysis of ion channels permeable to sodium, calcium and potassium. He played a pioneering role in the study of their pharmacology by introducing many toxins, many venoms and important drugs for hypertension (calcium blockers) or diabetes (antidiabetic sulfonylureas) The most recent work of his team has completed these pharmacological studies and amplified the discovery of new substances from venom with strong potential therapeutic possibilities. They have also led to the discovery of several new classes of ion channels essential for the sensory perception of mechanical stimuli, heat, cold and acidity. TREK/TRAAK channels, TASK channels and ASIC channels. These families of channels play an essential role in pain perception but also in synaptic transmission and neuroprotection at the cerebral level, particularly for polyunsaturated fatty acids of the ɯɜ type. TREK channels play a central role in depression. The TASK and TREK channels are a major therapeutic target for gaseous anesthetics.

Previously, Michel Lazdunski and his team had made pioneering discoveries on the CFTR channel associated with cystic fibrosis, which indicated the direction to follow for current therapeutic developments on some forms of this genetic disease.
