= Marcel Delépine =

French pharmacist and chemist (1871–1965)

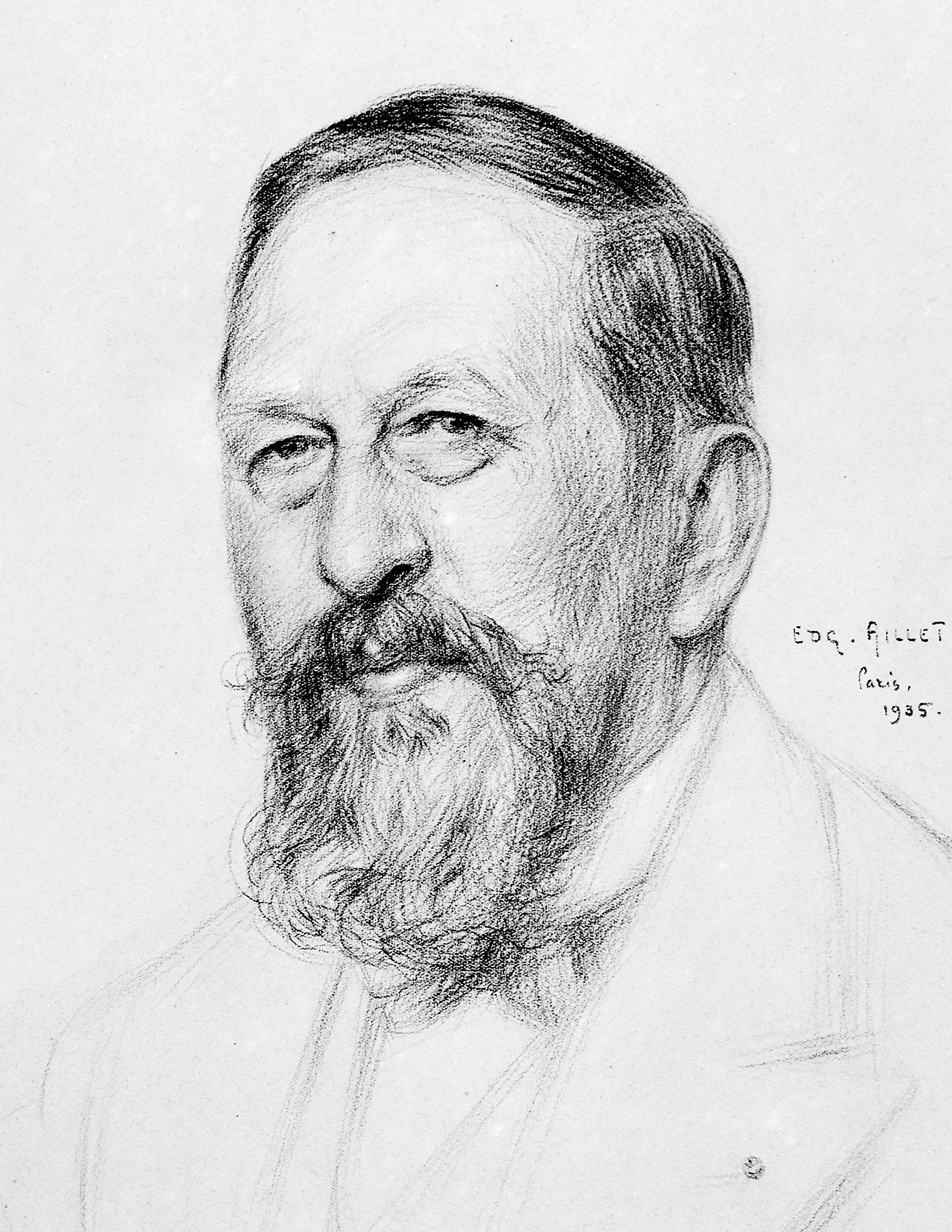
Stéphane Marcel Delépine

Stéphane Marcel Delépine (19 September 1871, in Saint-Martin-le-Gaillard – 21 September 1965) was a French pharmacist and chemist, whose name is associated with the Delépine reaction for the preparation of primary amines.

He studied at the Sorbonne and at the École Supérieure de Pharmacie in Paris, receiving his doctorate in 1898 with the thesis Amines et amides dérivés des aldéhydes ("The amines and amide derivatives of aldehydes"). From 1895 to 1902 he served as préparateur at the Collège de France, where he worked in the laboratory of Marcellin Berthelot. In 1902 he was named chief pharmacist to the hospitals of Paris, a position he maintained up until 1927.

From 1904 he was an agrégé at the École Supérieure de Pharmacie, attaining the chair of hydrology and hygiene in 1913. In 1930 he was appointed a professor of organic chemistry at the Collège de France.

In 1927 he became a scientific advisor for Etablissements Poulenc, and subsequently was named director of pharmaceutical research for Rhône-Poulenc. In 1930 he became a member of the Académie des sciences.

His work involved research in the fields of organic, inorganic and general chemistry. He made contributions in his investigations of terpenes, platinum group metals (iridium, rhodium), sulfur compounds, et al. In 1935 he described a general method for catalytic hydrogenation with Raney nickel. Also, when experimenting with thiocarbonic esters and related bodies, he discovered the phenomena of "oxyluminescence". In addition, he is credited for introducing a new process for preparation of pure tungsten.

== Selected works ==
- Composés endothermiques et exothermiques, 1899 – Endothermic and exothermic compounds.
- Carbures métalliques, 1904 – Metal carbides.
- La synthèse totale en chimie organique, 1937 – The total synthesis in organic chemistry.
- Chimie organique. Formules de constitution, isomérie, isomérie optique, 1937 – Organic chemistry; constitutional formulas, isomerism, optical isomerism.
- Un Grand chimiste analyste : Louis-Nicolas Vauquelin, 1941 – The great analytical chemist, Louis-Nicolas Vauquelin.
- Vie et œuvre de Joseph Achille Le Bel, 1949 – The life and work of Joseph Achille Le Bel.
