= Genes to Cells =

- Discipline: Molecular biology
- Language: English
- Edited by: Mitsuhiro Yanagida

Publication details
- Publisher: Wiley-Blackwell (United Kingdom)
- Frequency: Monthly
- Open access: After 6 months
- Impact factor: 2.048 (2017)

Standard abbreviations
- ISO 4: Genes Cells

Indexing
- ISSN: 1356-9597 (print); 1365-2443 (web)

Links
- Journal homepage

Genes to Cells is a peer-reviewed scientific journal that publishes original research on the molecular mechanisms of biological events. The journal has been published since 1996 by Wiley-Blackwell on behalf of the Molecular Biology Society of Japan.

== Indexing ==
Genes to Cells is indexed in:

- Abstracts in Anthropology
- Academic Search
- Academic Search Alumni Edition
- Academic Search Elite
- Academic Search Premier
- AgBiotech News & Information
- AgBiotechNet
- AGRICOLA Database
- Animal Breeding Abstracts
- Biocontrol News & Information
- Biological Abstracts
- Biological Science Database
- BIOSIS Previews
- Biotechnology Citation Index
- CAB Abstracts
- Embase
- Global Health
- Health Source Nursing/Academic
- Horticultural Science Abstracts
- InfoTrac
- Journal Citation Reports/Science Edition
- MEDLINE/PubMed
- Natural Science Collection
- Nematological Abstracts
- Nutrition Abstracts & Reviews Series A: Human & Experimental
- Plant Breeding Abstracts
- Plant Genetic Resources Abstracts
- Plant Growth Regulator Abstracts
- Poultry Abstracts
- PubMed Dietary Supplement Subset
- Research Alert
- Review of Agricultural Entomology
- Review of Aromatic & Medicinal Plants
- Review of Medical & Veterinary Entomology
- Review of Medical & Veterinary Mycology
- Review of Plant Pathology
- Science Citation Index
- Science Citation Index Expanded
- SciTech Premium Collection
- Soils & Fertilizers Abstracts
- Sugar Industry Abstracts
- Veterinary Bulletin
- Weed Abstracts
