= Jean Weissenbach =

French geneticist (born 1946)

- Born: 13 February 1946 (age 80); Strasbourg, France
- Known for: Human genome
- Awards: Gairdner Award (2002)
- Scientific career
- Fields: Genetics
- Workplaces: Genoscope

Jean Weissenbach (born 13 February 1946) is a French biologist. He is the current director of the Genoscope. He is one of the pioneers of sequencing and genome analysis.

== Publications ==
- Weissenbach, Jean (May 2004). "Genome sequencing: differences with the relatives". Nature. 429 (6990). England: 353–5. doi:10.1038/429353a. PMID 15164045.
- Weissenbach, J (2002). "Human genome project: past, present, future". Ernst Schering Res. Found. Workshop (36). Germany: 1–9. ISSN 0947-6075. PMID 11859560.
- Weissenbach, J (December 1998). "Human genome mapping and sequencing: perspectives for toxicology". Toxicol. Lett. 102–103. Netherlands: 1–4. doi:10.1016/S0378-4274(98)00267-7. ISSN 0378-4274. PMID 10022225.
- Weissenbach, J (August 1998). "The Human Genome Project: from mapping to sequencing". Clin. Chem. Lab. Med. 36 (8). Germany: 511–4. doi:10.1515/CCLM.1998.086. ISSN 1434-6621. PMID 9806450.
- Weissenbach, J (October 1996). "Landing on the genome". Science. 274 (5287). United States: 479. doi:10.1126/science.274.5287.479. ISSN 0036-8075. PMID 8927994.
- Weissenbach, J (March 1997). "Mapping and human genome sequence program". Pathol. Biol. (in French). 45 (3). France: 205–8. ISSN 0369-8114. PMID 9296064.
