= Discrimination against non-binary people =

Prejudicial treatment of people who do not identify as male or female

Discrimination against non-binary people, also called enbyphobia or exorsexism, is discrimination against people who do not identify exclusively or at all as male or female. It may occur in social, professional, medical or legal contexts.

== Social discrimination ==
Non-binary people may be considered confusing, wrong, evil, or nonexistent to people who subscribe to the binary theory of gender.

According to a 2016 study from The Journal of Sex Research, one of the most common themes of discrimination for genderqueer people is the incorrect use of gender pronouns. The study labeled this as "nonaffirmation", and it occurs when others do not affirm one's sense of gender identity. The negative effects of misgendering are well-documented. A 2018 study published in the American Psychological Association found a positive association between misgendering and anxiety, depression, and stress. Repeated misgendering by strangers, also known as chronic misgendering, can amplify these stressors to the point where trans individuals do not want to leave their homes.

Participants within the 2016 study also reported experiencing gender policing. Gender policing is especially common in K-12 schools on a systematic level. One way in which systematic gender policing manifests in schools is through sex-segregated bathrooms. A study published in the Journal of Gay & Lesbian Services found that 23.9% of trans students surveyed, or 439 students out of 1836, were denied access to gender-appropriate bathrooms or housing at school due to being transgender or gender non-conforming. An article from the book Violence and Gender states that this experienced violence and discrimination leads to high levels of stress. This article stated that non-binary participants are less likely to experience hate speech (24.4% vs. 50%) compared to trans men and equally as likely (24.4% vs. 24.4%) as trans women, yet genderqueer/nonbinary participants, along with trans women, are more likely than trans men to be concerned about the safety of themselves and others.

=== Bathroom access ===
Non-binary individuals, when interviewed, found binary spaces such as bathrooms to be difficult to navigate, reporting visual inspections, questioning, and harassment when entering such spaces. In a 2019 paper by Douglas Schrock, interviewees reported being addressed with fear, being pressured to apologize for their appearance or androgyny, verbal confrontations, and in an extreme case, a stranger attempting to break into a stall due to suspicion. A quantitative study found that bathroom discrimination significantly increased the odds of considering or attempting suicide, with 60% of surveyed youths who were denied access to gender-appropriate bathrooms considering suicide.

=== Brazil ===
A study by the State University of São Paulo (Unesp) found that 2% of the Brazilian population identifies as transgender, while approximately 1.19% identifies as non-binary, which equates to approximately three million people. Despite this, the Brazilian Institute of Geography and Statistics (IBGE) did not include specific questions about non-binary identity in its census.

=== South Korea ===
There are no national statistics that identify what share of the population is transgender and/or non-binary. According to a human rights organization, transgender and non-binary people make up 7.8% of the LGBTQ+ community.

Many forms of segregation between the sexes are common in schools, such as separate uniforms, changing rooms, and bathrooms. Transgender and non-binary youth tend to experience high levels of emotional distress and bullying, with a study from the National Institutes of Health (NIH) found over 67% of students in secondary education have heard discriminatory remarks from teachers.

Legal protections against discrimination (particularly in the work force) are severely limited, resulting in transgender and non-binary people earning the lowest average income in the Korean LGBTQ+ population.

=== United States ===
Of the approximately 6,450 transgender and gender-nonconforming respondents to the National Transgender Discrimination Survey (NTDS), conducted by the National Center for Transgender Equality and National Gay and Lesbian Task Force in 2008–2009, 864 (13%) chose the write-in option for gender identity, "A gender not listed here (please specify)". (The other options were "Male/man", "Female/women", and "Part time as one gender, part time as another".) Responses from these participants were analysed in the 2011 journal article "A Gender Not Listed Here: Genderqueers, Gender Rebels, and Otherwise in the National Transgender Discrimination Survey". Individuals reporting "a gender not listed here" experienced higher rates of physical (32% vs. 25%) and sexual (15% vs 9%) assault due to bias than other NTDS respondents.

== Workplace discrimination ==
=== Europe ===
In 2025, The International Journal of Human Resource Management published a paper by Anne Humbert and others regarding gender-based discrimination against nonbinary people in the workplace across fifteen European countries. They found that three quarters of both nonbinary and people with genders not listed in the survey experienced at least one form of social exclusion in the workplace, compared to around two-thirds of binary women and just over half of binary men. Four in ten nonbinary people were found to unsafe in at least one part of their workplace, thrice as likely as men. Nonbinary people were far more likely to experience psychological violence at work, with four-fifths having experienced at least one incident compared to binary men (three-fifths) and women (three-quarters). Specifically, nonbinary people were more likely to be openly disrespected in front of others, with 62% having experienced it compared to 40% of men and 53% of women. Nearly half of nonbinary people experienced some form of sexual harassment in the workplace, with about 30% receiving intrusive comments about their appearance and 25% being asked inappropriate questions about their private life.

Data from Humbert's study

Experienced at work	Total %	Gender not listed %	Men %	Nonbinary %	Women %
One or more forms of social exclusion	60.89	74.76	53.73	75.18	67.70
Feeling unsafe in one or more work spaces	24.29	28.61	16.73	43.87	31.42
One or more incidents of psychological violence	68.37	69.48	62.66	80.94	73.90
One or more incidents of sexual harassment	33.59	38.95	23.49	47.91	43.44

=== United States ===
According to the NTDS, almost all non-binary people had experienced discrimination in the workplace. Their findings show that being out as a non-binary person negatively affects that person's employment outcomes. Though non-binary people have higher unemployment rates than those who identify with a specified gender, masculine non-binary people who still appear male, or are not "passing as female" generally have a harder time in the work environment. 19% of respondents to the NTDS identifying themselves as "a gender not listed here" reported job loss due to anti-transgender bias, a smaller proportion than for other respondents (27%).

Not only does discrimination against transgender and non-binary people in the workplace affect transgender and non-binary employees, but it also affects the entire workplace team, distracting the victim and the perpetrator from the job itself. Transgender and non-binary individuals in the U.S. often face workplace discrimination like conflicts related to their bathroom usage, backlash over transitioning genders and being misgendered by coworkers. The Center of American Progress in 2012 also found that there is also a substantial amount of public ignorance towards transgender and non-binary communities, in comparison to LGB community peers. Because of that, negative psychological consequences occur as a result like mental health disparities, higher rates in attempted suicide, and anxiety in public spaces.

== Military discrimination ==
=== United States ===
In the United States military, physical fitness tests such as the United States Army Physical Fitness Test only have male or female standards with gender norming. The National Center for Transgender Equality has called on the US Department of Defense to "adopt policies to permit transgender service members with a non-binary gender identity to serve in a manner consistent with their gender identity."

On February 26, 2025, the Department of Defense (DoD) released a policy memorandum titled "Additional Guidance on Prioritizing Military Excellence", expressing that service members suffering from gender dysphoria do not adhere to the strict standards of serving in the military and will therefore be dismissed. These standards include identifying with biological sex and pronouns with that identity.

The document outlines that the DoD only acknowledges two sexes: male and female. A policy statement in the memorandum describes that a person's sex is fixed and does not change over time, and it mandates that all service members must serve based on their biological sex. Furthermore, the DoD will deny funds to service members who want to pursue sex reassignment surgical procedures or cross-sex hormone therapy. Any unscheduled, scheduled, or planned surgical procedures will be cancelled. The living conditions within military spaces will also change to reflect the department's view of sex. Intimate spaces will be marked for either male, female, or family use in line with military guidelines for sex.

For military veterans who are transgender, non-binary, or intersex, the Department of Veterans Affairs (VA) has announced the discontinuation of providing healthcare such as hormone therapy or mental health services. The conclusion of the Veterans Health Administration's (VHA) 2018 Directive 1341, a policy that expanded healthcare access to these populations.

Lindsay Church, Executive Director of Minority Veterans of America, stresses that the decision for the department to rescind Directive 1341 is a "direct attack on the dignity and well-being of transgender, non-binary, and intersex veterans —one that will have deadly outcomes".

== Health discrimination ==
=== New Zealand ===
A 2019 study by the Professional Association for Transgender Health Aotearoa led by Jaimie Veale of the University of Waikato showed that "One in five participants avoided seeing a doctor in the last 12 months because they were worried about disrespect or mistreatment as a trans or non-binary person".

=== United Kingdom ===
A 2015 survey conducted by the Scottish Trans Alliance examined experiences of medical services among 224 non-binary individuals who had attended a gender identity clinic (GIC) in the preceding two years. When asked if they had experienced "problems getting the assistance they needed" because of their non-binary identity, 28% chose "yes", 28% "maybe", and 44% "no". Denial of treatment was reported by 13 respondents (6%), delay of treatment by 12 (5%), and lack of knowledge or understanding about their identities by 10 (5%). When asked if they had been pressured by the GIC, 43% chose "yes", 12% "unsure", and 46% "no". Respondents reported having been pressured to appear more binary (36 individuals, 17%), to change their names (19, 9%), to socially transition to fulfil the real-life experience requirement (13, 6%), or to pursue medical transition (13, 6%).

Under the law of the United Kingdom, individuals are considered by the state to be either female or male, the sex that is stated on their birth certificate. This means that non-binary gender is not recognized in UK law.

=== United States ===
A survey conducted among rural U.S. LGBTQ+ populations suggested that transgender and non-binary patients were three times more likely to find health care providers that have other LGBTQ+ patients. They were also three times more likely to drive over an hour out of the way to visit their health care provider due "to the fact that in the last year, one in ten had visited an LGBTQ+-specific health care clinic, which are often located in urban areas."

A 2015 study found that 20.4% of transgender and gender-nonconforming respondents to the NTDS reported having experienced discrimination when trying to access doctors and hospitals, 11.9% when attempting to access emergency rooms, and 4.6% when attempting to access the service of an ambulance.

=== Russia ===
In contemporary Russian psychiatry and psychology, as a rule, a binary approach to gender identity is used. V. D. Mendelevich, a psychiatrist, testifies that non-binary people are faced with demands to "determine" their gender identity in the binary paradigm. Refusal to do so is perceived as psychopathological. According to Mendelevich, the use of this approach does not correspond to modern scientific ideas about norm and pathology.

== Legal discrimination ==
=== Australia ===
The Sex Discrimination Act of 1984 did not explicitly protect non-binary people from discrimination until the Sex Discrimination Amendment (Sexual Orientation, Gender Identity and Intersex Status) Act of 2013, which prohibited any discrimination on the grounds of "gender identity" and "intersex status". This amendment also removed the use of "other" and "opposite sex" in exchange for broader terms like "different sex".

In 2014, the Australian High Court legally recognized non-binary as a category for people to identify with on legal documents. After Norrie May-Welby made a request for a third gender identity on legal documents and was eventually denied, Norrie chose to take the matter up with Australia's Human Rights Commission and their Court of Appeal. After a four-year-long legal battle beginning in 2010, Norrie finally won the case. From this and the legalizing of the matter in New South Wales, the Australian Capital Territory decided to pass a law that recognized non-binary identities. Several other states and territories followed suit afterward.

=== Canada ===
In 2002, the Northwest Territories was the first of Canada's provinces to explicitly include gender identity as a protected group from discrimination under the law, followed by Manitoba in 2012. By 2015, every Canadian province and territory had included similar changes to their discrimination laws.

In 2017, Canada passed Bill C-16 which formally recognized non-binary gender people and granted them protection under the law towards discrimination on the grounds of "gender identity" and "gender expression."

=== Italy ===
In 2024, the Italian Constitutional Court, with judgment no. 143 of July 23, explicitly recognized for the first time the existence of non-binary individuals, affirming that they too are entitled to the protection of fundamental rights guaranteed by the Constitution—such as the right to personal identity, health, and equal social dignity (Articles 2, 3, and 32). However, the Court declared inadmissible the request to introduce a "non-binary" gender marker in the civil registry, stating that such a profound change to Italy's legal and administrative system—still firmly rooted in a male/female binary—requires legislative action and cannot be enacted through judicial interpretation alone. At the same time, the Court ruled unconstitutional the legal requirement for judicial authorization to access gender-affirming surgery after legal gender rectification, considering it an unjustified obstacle to individual self-determination. In summary, the decision marks an important step toward the recognition of non-conforming gender identities, but it leaves unresolved the full legal recognition of non-binary gender, which remains in the hands of Parliament. Non-binary individuals are now recognized as subjects of rights. It is no longer mandatory to obtain a judge's authorization to undergo gender-affirming surgery after the legal change of gender. For the first time, the Court explicitly acknowledges that there are individuals who do not identify as male or female, and affirms that their right to identity is constitutionally protected (Articles 2, 3, and 32). The obligation to obtain judicial authorization for surgery after legal gender rectification was declared unconstitutional, as it is no longer justified.

In 2025, the Italian Ministry of Education mandated that schools in the country ban the use of gender-neutral language, such as asterisks and schwa.

=== United Kingdom ===
Non-binary is not legally recognized as a gender identity in the United Kingdom. The Gender Recognition Act 2004 allowed people to apply to the Gender Recognition Panel for a change of gender after living as the gender they wished to show on all their legal documents and being given a diagnosis of gender dysphoria by at least two health professionals. However, this only allowed for a legal change of gender from male to female or vice versa. There is no non-binary specific legal clinical pathway available for medical assistance, and non-binary people will receive a new NHS number denoting the sex opposite to the one they were assigned at birth.

=== United States ===
Despite being more likely to achieve higher levels of education when compared to the general public, 90% of non-binary individuals face discrimination, often in the form of harassment in the workplace. 19% percent of self-identifying non-binary individuals reported job loss as a result of their identities. The current proposed version of the federal Employment Non-Discrimination Act use such terms as "gender identity" and "gender expression", categories under which non-binary individuals fall in due to the fact that their gender expression cannot be defined as male or female.

Non-binary individuals are subject to higher rates of physical and sexual assault and police harassment than those who identify as men or women, likely due to their gender expression or presentation.

==== Identity documents ====
In 2016, the U.S. State Department was sued for denying a passport to Dana Zzyym, who is a veteran, an intersex person and then also identified as a non-binary person. Zzyym wrote "intersex" on their passport form instead of male or female, which were the only two available gender fields on the form. Zzyym was denied the passport, which led to LGBTQ advocacy organizations filing a lawsuit against the U.S. State Department on Zzyym's behalf. The advocacy group Lambda Legal argued for gender-neutral terms and a third option on U.S. passports, arguing that the existing passport fields violated the Due Process Clause and Equal Protection Clause of the U.S. Constitution. The State Department argued that adding additional gender fields to the passport form would prevent the agency's efforts to combat identity theft and passport fraud. The Tenth Circuit Court ruled in favor of Zzyym, the first time in U.S. history that the federal government recognized non-binary people.

In California, the Gender Recognition Act of 2017 was introduced in the State Senate in Sacramento in January 2017 and signed into law by governor Jerry Brown on October 19. The law recognizes a third gender option known as "non-binary" which may be used on state-issued documents such as driver's licenses to more accurately reflect a person's gender. Senate bill SB179 was originally drafted by State Senators Toni Atkins and Scott Wiener. The law also makes it easier for existing documents to be changed, by removing requirements for sworn statements by physicians and replacing it with a sworn attestation by the person seeking to make the change to their documents. The Executive Director of Equality California commented, "It is up to an individual—not a judge or even a doctor—to define a person's gender identity."

The first two U.S. citizens to receive a court decreed non-binary gender were in Oregon and California. In Oregon, Elisa Rae Shupe was able to obtain a non-binary designation in June 2016 after a brief legal battle. Following in Shupe's footsteps, California resident Sarah Kelly Keenan was also able to legally change her gender marker to non-binary in September 2016. After both Shupe and Keenan had success with their cases, more people have been inspired to take on the legal battle of changing their gender to a non-binary marker. With the help of organizations such as the Nonbinary & Intersex Recognition Project dozens of these petitions have been granted and additional states have changed regulations to provide a third gender option on state ID, birth certificates, and/or court orders.

=== Switzerland ===
From 1 January 2022, it is possible to change your name and legal gender on documents in Switzerland without the need for a medical report or judicial authorization. Despite this, there is no legal recognition of non-binary gender in the country and the Swiss government has decided that it is not mandatory to recognize documents with neutral gender markers issued abroad, although it has expressed concern about the situation.

A Tamedia survey found that 62% of Swiss are against the introduction of a gender-neutral marker in official documents, while around 35-40% are in favour of the change.

== See also ==
- Anti-gender movement
- Cosmetics policy
- Gender-based dress codes
- Gender polarization
- Transphobia
