= KuToo movement =

Movement against high heel policy in workplaces in Japan

The #KuToo movement is an ongoing movement in Japan against the high heel policy in workplaces. The name is a reference to the Me Too movement and a play on words with kutsu (靴, "shoes") and kutsū (苦痛, "pain").

== Origins and development ==
KuToo was started in 2019 by Yumi Ishikawa, a Japanese actress, freelance writer, and part-time funeral parlor worker. Many businesses in Japan require women employees to wear heels of between five and seven centimeters, or 1.9 and 2.75 inches, in height. Ishikawa found shoes of this type to be inconvenient and uncomfortable at work, and complained on Twitter about wearing them. Her comment received nearly 30,000 retweets and more than 60,000 likes, and other women shared their own stories of discomfort with heels, posting photos of their bloodied and blistered feet.

Ishikawa then collected 18,856 signatures for a petition on not forcing women to wear high heels in the workplace and presented it to Ministry of Health, Labour and Welfare. At the parliamentary committee session of Health, Labour and Welfare on June 5, 2019, Minister of Health, Labour and Welfare said "in terms of work place safety, it is very important for employer to consider whether clothing and foot wear can lead backpain or slipping incident etc. and necessary safety procedures shall be taken according to the individual workplace condition", "requiring Women to wear heels in workplace shall be done within the reasonable necessity and range of reasonable necessity is determined based on common sense with considering to the individual work place condition", "requiring worker with foot injury to wear heels without necessity can be considered to be power harassment", but his remarks were interpreted quite differently by different media outlets. One is that the minister said he could not condone forcing women to wear high heels in the workplace, and the other is that the minister condoned forcing women to wear high heels in the workplace. In response to a press inquiry seeking the truth, the Ministry of Health, Labour and Welfare described the minister's remarks as "While it is unacceptable to force women to wear high heels in circumstances that result in accidents or injury, neither can the government prohibit companies from requiring female employees to wear high heels unless they are beyond what is necessary and reasonable in the course of business in accordance with conventional wisdom."

One reason for the apathy of Japanese Diet members toward this issue may be the prevalence of men in positions of power who lack experience using high heels. While Japanese business culture is also rigid about men's clothing and puts pressure on male workers to dress in specific ways, this does not cause them physical pain and injury. In June 2019, Ishikawa organized an event in Tokyo where men tried on high-heeled shoes and attempted to walk in them, allowing them to experience firsthand the pain and discomfort that such shoes cause many women.

In addition to the strict expectations around professional footwear for women, many companies are now requiring women to not wear glasses because it gives off a "cold impression". This dress code provision reinforces the #KuToo movement's perspective that strict professional dress codes for women exist as a discriminatory practice. Ishikawa also spoke out against the discriminatory nature of these new professional dress codes. Women in Japan are speaking out using the hashtag "glasses are forbidden" on social media, with many asking officials to take a second looks at the rules.

Ishikawa has since expanded the movement from shoes to a broader spectrum of women's rights issues in Japan. Ishikawa often speaks out against social inequalities in Japan, such as slut-shaming culture and the societal expectations of women to remain silent, noting how this prevents them from speaking out against injustice.

In her newly released book, Ishikawa writes about how being angry makes someone appear unlikable and hysteric. Japanese culture frowns upon the outward expression of emotion. Ishikawa expresses how good it feels to go against this expectation and be angry.

== Health concerns ==
Women using the #KuToo tag have compared wearing high heels to foot binding. Many women work long hours on their feet and/or in uncomfortable positions. This can lead to foot pain and conditions such blisters and bunions that interfere with work and well-being.

High heel shoes pose many physical risks aside from blistering and bleeding. Regular use has been associated with increased rates of first person injury and musculoskeletal pain. High heel shoes can create lasting negative effects when worn in constant use above two inches, like the women in Japan are expected to wear. Regular wear can cause lower back, hip, and knee issues, which can lead to osteoarthritis. Osteoarthritis occurs when the cartilage between bones wears away such that the bones start to grind together with movement. Regular wear can also shorten the Achilles tendon, as well as tighten and reshape the calf muscles to adjust to the pressure.

In Japan, employer's obligation to ensure workplace safety is already established (ja:労働契約法#安全配慮義務). The then prime minister said "In each workplace, as a first step, it's important that both employer and employee talk each other based on existing related laws."

== Gender discrimination and traditional Japanese views ==
Public opinion in Japan on the #KuToo movement has varied. Ishikawa claimed that her tweet has received more publicity from countries other than Japan. She described Japan as viewing the movement in terms of health concerns rather than discrimination based on gender. In answer to questions from Kanako Otsuji, a member of the opposition Constitutional Democratic Party of Japan, Health and Labor Minister Takumi Nemoto responded to Ishikawa's petition by claiming that wearing high heels is acceptable when it is necessary and appropriate for socially acceptable work, but that forcing women to wear certain shoes without a work-related reason is power harassment. When asked during the same session, Emiko Takagai, Deputy Minister of Health, Labor and Welfare, stated that "she does not believe women should be forced to wear high heels." A survey of Japanese women found that 60% of respondents viewed wearing high heel shoes as enforced by their workplace. During the March 2020 House of Councilor's Budget Meeting, former prime minister Shinzo Abe stated that "women should not have irrational rules that lead to pain imposed upon them."

The #KuToo movement's progression remains slow due to various obstacles solidified by long-standing views on gender roles in Japan and expectations of social conformity. Japanese views on gender roles remain traditional, with women being socially designed to childcare and domestic tasks, regardless of whether or not they have paid employment. The World Economic Forum listed Japan at 121 out of 153 countries in terms of measures for gender gaps in 2020, indicating that societal expectations of women remain discriminatory. Traditional views on gender are reinforced through Japanese television and advertising, which continue to shape Japanese perceptions of reality. In advertisements, research has found that media that involved women were focused on cosmetics and clothes, whereas "men prevailed over women in the 'high-level business' and 'professional' categories by about 2 to 1."

The #KuToo movement is part of a recent shift towards resisting traditional views of gender roles and fighting gender discrimination in Japan. Notably, it emerged shortly after the Tokyo Medical University entrance exam scandal. The school, one of the most highly regarded medical schools in Japan, was forced to admit that female applicants' exams scores had been regularly adjusted for more than ten years so as to lower the number of female students accepted. Several other medical schools were later revealed to have done the same. It also came after journalist Shiori Itō publicly spoke out against sexual harassment following her thwarted attempts to report her own sexual assault by Noriyuki Yamaguchi. Itō faced substantial backlash for speaking out, including being called an embarrassment and behaving immorally to advance her career. The harassment and threats became so severe that she eventually moved to the UK. However, this did not stop her from pursuing a civil case, which she won. She was chosen as one of TIME's 100 most influential people in 2020 for her legal and social justice work in the Me Too movement.

Womenomics is a core part of Abenomics in which "women's participation in the labor force is encouraged". The initiative has made some difference in equalizing the professional field for women as well as provided evidence for the positive economic effects of having women in positions of power within companies. However, it has not succeeded at placing a significant number of women in positions of power or addressed the deeply rooted societal expectations related to progressing women's rights in the workplace. This was recently exemplified by the economic impact of the COVID-19 pandemic in 2020, notably the lack of job security endemic to a female labor force made up of a majority of "non-regular workers" whose income is perceived as supplementary to that of an assumed male partner. Additionally, there is some concern that the gains made so far are at risk following the resignation of Abe in August 2020 and the uncertain economic vision and conservative leanings of incomer Yoshihide Suga.

== See also ==
- Cosmetics policy
- Gender-based dress codes
- High heel policy
