= Dress code =

Clothing code based on event or occasion

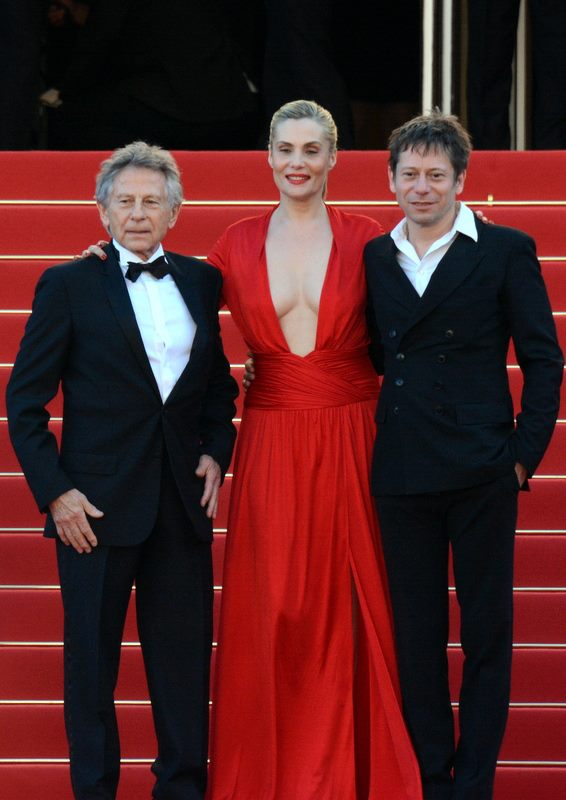
Cannes Film Festival has a dress code that requires men to wear tuxedos and women to wear gowns and high-heeled shoes.

A dress code is a set of rules, often written, with regard to what clothing groups of people must wear. Dress codes are created out of social perceptions and norms, and vary based on purpose, circumstances, and occasions. Different societies and cultures are likely to have different dress codes, Western dress codes being a prominent example.

Dress codes are symbolic indications of different social ideas, including social class, cultural identity, attitude towards comfort, tradition, and political or religious affiliations. Dress code also allows individuals to read others' behavior as good, or bad by the way they express themselves with their choice of apparel.

== History ==
=== Europe ===
From the seventh through the ninth centuries, the European royalty and nobility used a dress code to differentiate themselves from other people. All classes generally wore the same clothing, although distinctions among the social hierarchy began to become more noticeable through ornamented garments. Common pieces of clothing worn by peasants and the working class included plain tunics, cloaks, jackets, pants, and shoes. According to rank, embellishments adorned the collar of the tunic, waist or border. Examples of these decorations included, as James Planché states, "gold and silver chains and crosses, bracelets of gold, silver or ivory, golden and jeweled belts, strings of amber and other beads, rings, brooches, [and] buckles". The nobility tended to wear longer tunics than the lower social classes.

While dress codes of modern-day Europeans are less strict, there are some exceptions. It is possible to ban certain types of clothing in the workplace, as exemplified by the European Court of Justice’s verdict that "a ban on Islamic headscarves at work can be lawful."

=== The Americas ===
The indigenous peoples of the Pacific Northwest Coast had a complex social hierarchy that consisted of slaves, commoners, and nobles, with dress codes indicating these social distinctions. John R. Jewitt, an Englishman who wrote a memoir about his years as a captive of the Nuu-chah-nulth people in 1802-1805, describes how, after some time living there, Maquinna and the chiefs decided that he must now be "considered one of them, and conform to their customs". Jewitt resented the imposition of this dress code, finding the loose untailored garments very cold, and attributed to them a subsequent illness of which he almost died. He was not allowed to cut his hair and had to paint his face and body as a Nootka would.

In the early 20th century, informal wear was the norm across many social settings, including workplaces, restaurants, travel, and movie theaters. In the 1950s, casual wear became prominent in many of these settings, but informal wear remained dominant in workplaces and churches. Beginning in the 1980s, technology companies in Silicon Valley developed the business casual dress code, which was part of a broader organizational culture of emphasizing efficiency over propriety. Today, casual wear is the norm in the tech industry, exemplified by tech executives such as Steve Jobs and Mark Zuckerberg.

In North American high schools, fashion for girls began to be more revealing in the late twentieth century, including clothing such as low-rise jeans, revealing tops, miniskirts, and spaghetti straps. With these new styles appearing in schools, dress codes have in some cases become more rigorous as a result.

The dress codes in North American high schools typically resulted in tests that would determine if skirts or shorts were long enough. A common test would be used to measure the appropriate length of students' shorts/skirts. If a student's fingers extended past their clothing, then the clothing was considered a violation of the school dress code.

=== Sikhism ===
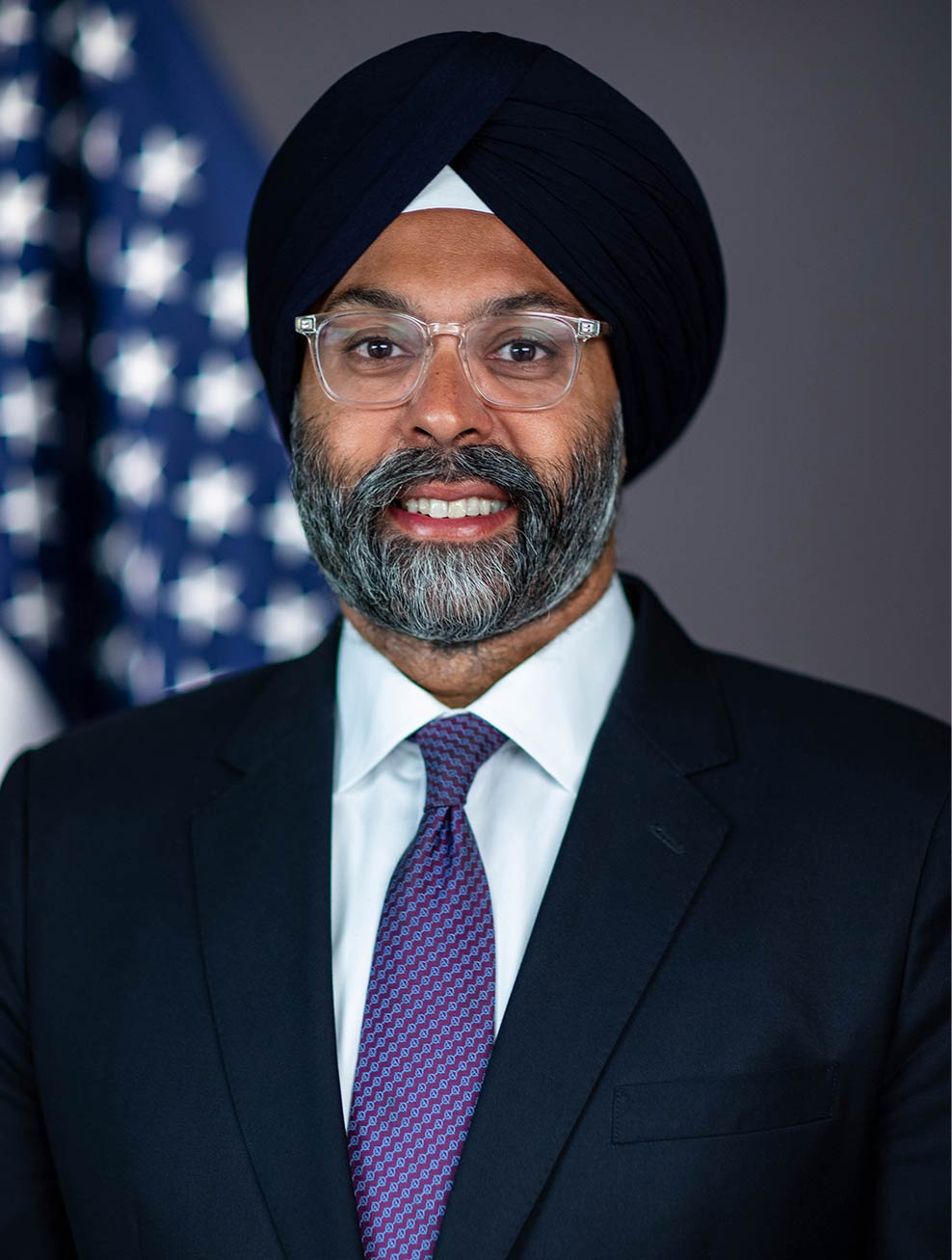
Gurbir Grewal, member of the United States Securities and Exchange Commission

Sikhism, which was founded in the Indian subcontinent around the end of the fifteenth century, also requires a dress code. Male Sikhs who are members of the Khalsa usually wear a turban at all times. Some, but not all, male Sikhs in North America wear a turban; they will instead tie their hair in a knot or ponytail. The Five Ks merely requires that hair grows naturally (Kesh) and that it is kept neatly with a Kanga.

== Laws and social norms ==
Cultural values, norms, and laws regarding clothing can vary by location. For example, the degree of nudity that is acceptable changes depending on location. In New Guinea and Vanuatu, there are areas where it is customary for men to wear nothing but penis sheaths in public, while women wear string skirts. In remote areas of Bali, women may go topless, which is less common in more Western countries.

It is illegal for civilians to wear Camouflage clothing in Trinidad and Tobago, or even to import it into that country.

Most Western countries have generally no rules regarding specific clothing in most public scenarios, but only have private rules.

=== Muslim world ===
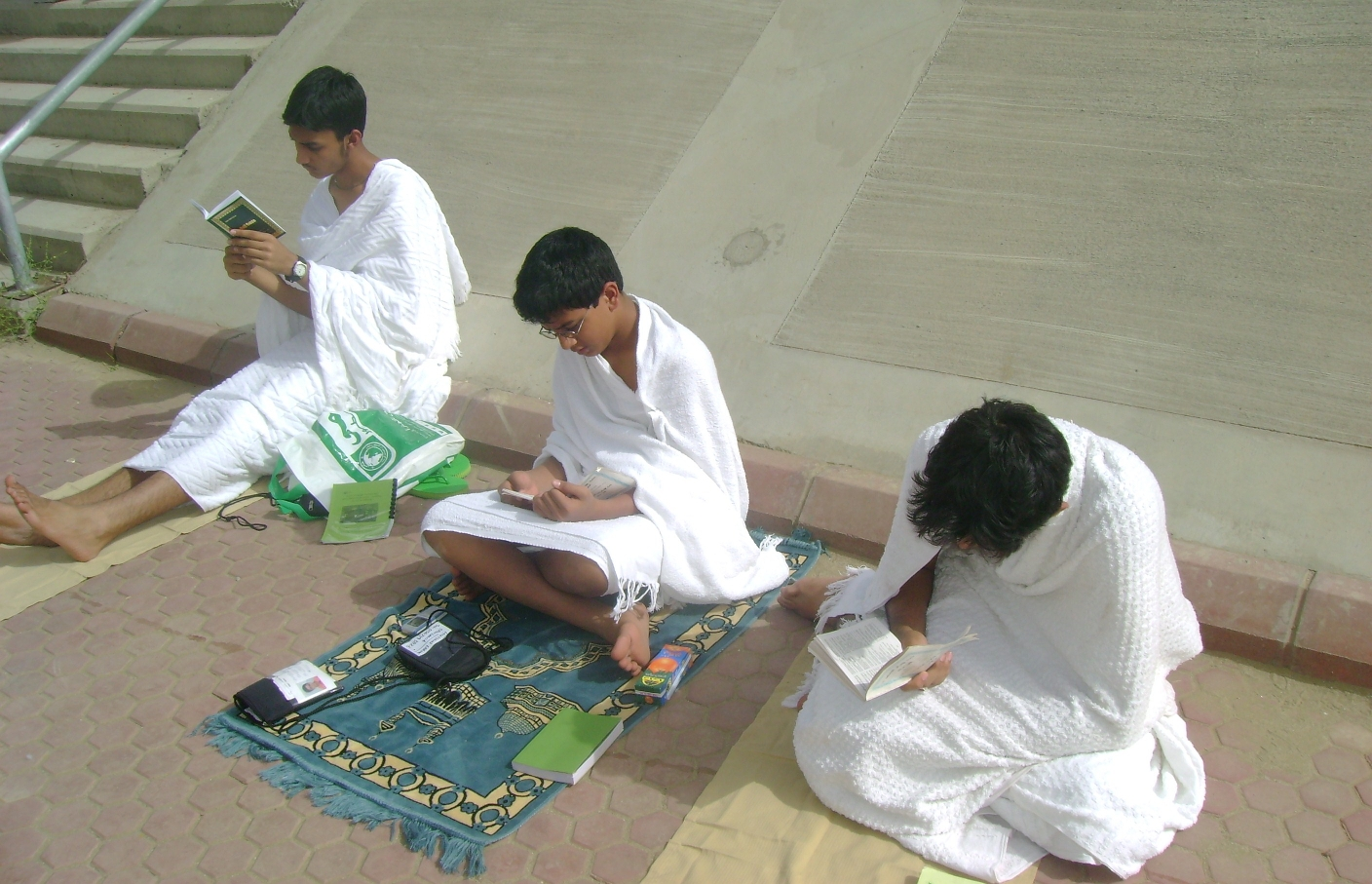
Boys wearing Ihram clothing supplicate during the Day of 'Arafat in the Hejaz

Islam, founded in the seventh century CE, laid out rules regarding the attire of both men and women in public. Gold adornments and silk clothes are prohibited for men to wear, as they are luxurious, but they are permissible for women. Men are also required to wear the ihram clothing while on Hajj, or annual pilgrimage to Mecca.

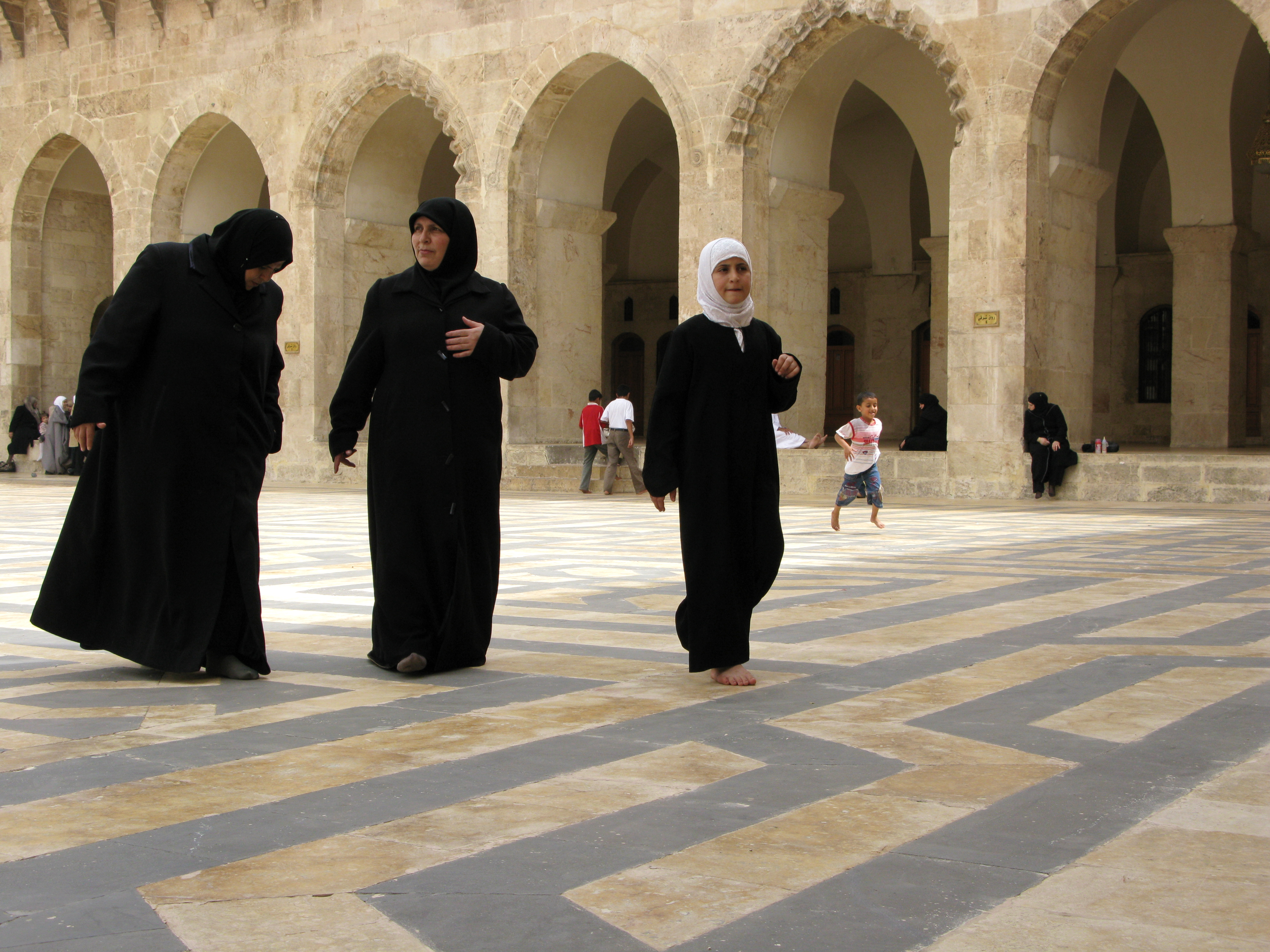
Syrian women in hijabs

Hijab generally refers to various head coverings conventionally worn by some Muslim women, most often a headscarf wrapped around the head, covering the hair, neck and ears, but leaving the face visible. The use of the hijab has been on the rise worldwide since the 1970s and is viewed by many Muslims as expressing modesty and faith. There is a consensus among Islamic religious scholars that covering the head is either required or preferred, though some Muslim scholars and activists argue that it is not mandated.

Islamic clothing codes vary by country, especially Islamic veiling practices by country. In Dubai, it is less strict outside of mosques, but for both men and women, shoulders and knees must be covered in public. Nudity is illegal in Dubai for both sexes, cross-dressing is prohibited, and toplessness or cleavage is essentially illegal for women. In Afghanistan, the hijab is compulsory for all women and everywhere, including in schools, while the burqa is not mandatory but is customary. On the other hand, in the People's Republic of China, the burqa is banned in the Islamic area of Xinjiang.

=== Indigenous costumes ===
Indigenous national costumes are often preferred for certain occasions, even among communities that also incorporate more widespread dress customs from the West. The barong tagalog for men and baro't saya for women are formal wear in the Philippines. Other examples include chut thai in Thailand, kilts in Scotland, and kente in Ghana. Bhutan's code of etiquette, driglam namzha, specifies indigenous clothing that should be worn in public, both formally and informally; adherence to this code in certain settings has been legally mandated since 1989.

== Private dress codes ==
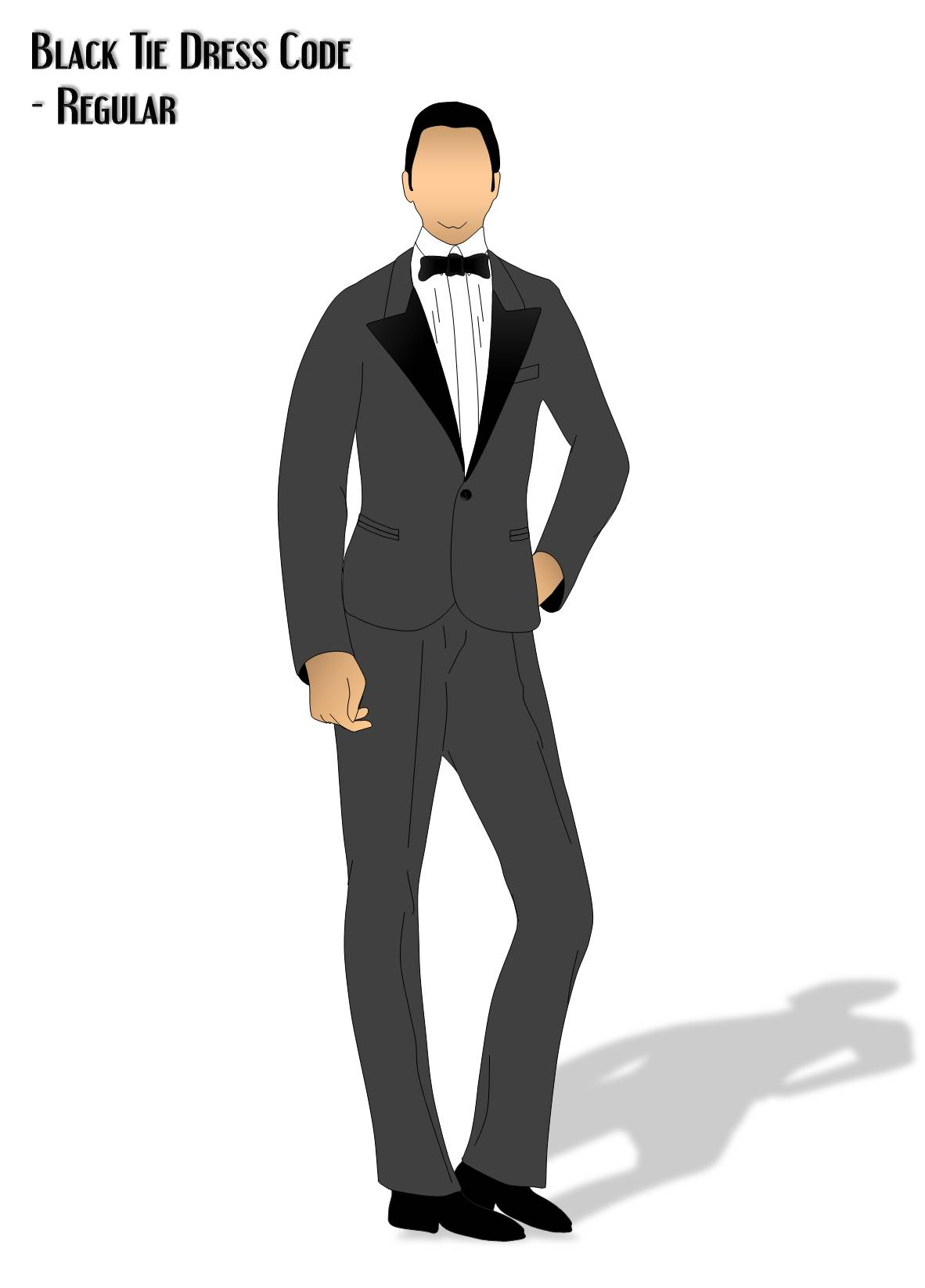
Black tie standard

Many places have their own private dress code; these organizations may insist on particular dress codes or standards in particular situations, such as for weddings, funerals, religious gatherings, etc.

=== Workplace ===
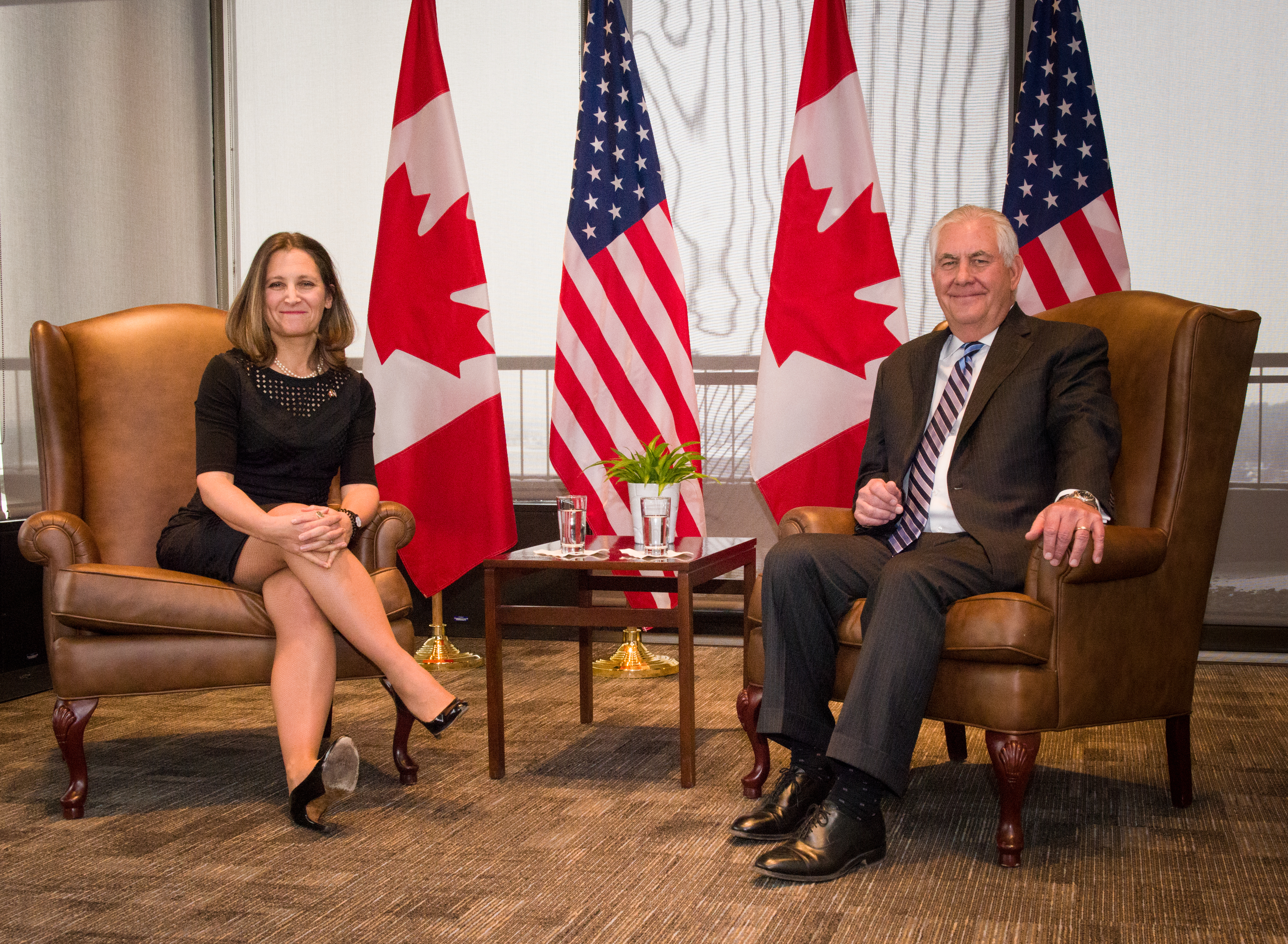
Canadian Deputy PM Chrystia Freeland with U.S. Secretary of State Rex Tillerson in Western dress code at a meeting

Employees are sometimes required to wear a uniform or certain standards of dress, such as a business suit and tie. This may depend on particular situations, for example if they are expected to interact with customers. (See also International standard business attire)

In Western countries, these policies vary depending on the industry. Lawyers, bankers, and executives often wear a suit and tie, with black shoes and belt, while casual wear is more common in the technology industry. Some businesses observe that anti-discrimination laws restricts their determining what is appropriate and inappropriate workplace clothing. Requiring men and women to dress differently at the workplace can be challenged because the gender-specific dress codes would be based on one sex and could be considered stereotypical. Most businesses have authority in determining and establishing what workplace clothes they can require of their workers. Generally, a carefully drafted dress code applied consistently does not violate anti-discrimination laws. So long as the dress code does not favor one gender over the other it is usually acceptable by law for employers to have a private dress code.

In the United States, it is legal for employers to require women to wear makeup and ban men from wearing it. It has been argued that such a distinction in a dress code is not discriminatory because both sexes have rules about their appearance. An important court case that occurred in the U.S was the Jespersen v. Harrah's Operating Co., which allowed for a workplace to require that female employees wear makeup while their male counterparts were banned from doing so. Darlene Jespersen worked at Harrah's Casino for more than 20 years and found that the makeup and dress code was not only unattainable but degrading. Jespersen found that the 'Personal Best' policy was not true to her natural appearance as it required a full face of makeup including foundation, powder, blush, mascara, and lipstick. Jespersen stated that this policy "forced her to be ... 'dolled up' like a sexual object, and ... took away her credibility as an individual and as a person." In opposition men who worked at Harrah's Casino were banned from wearing makeup, nail polish, and other traditionally female attires. Judge Kozinski argued that hyperfemininity was a burden that only women employees suffered. Kozinski stated that the time, effort and expense was more of a hindrance than just being banned from wearing makeup. However despite these efforts, in the ruling, it was decided that women did not have a larger burden in the requirements of the dress code but two judges disagreed and argued that makeup takes more time and money and that sex stereotyping occurred because women's bare faces were seen as less desirable.

==== New Jersey BorgataBabes case ====
In New Jersey, twenty-one women sued the Borgata Casino Hotel & Spa for requiring them to lose weight and stay under a certain size to maintain their jobs. The women argued that the management would ridicule them over weight gain even if they were pregnant. The case was dismissed in New Jersey because the BorgataBabes program required that both men and women maintain certain body shapes and sizes. The "BorgataBabes contractually agreed to adhere to these strict personal appearance and conduct standards". In 2016, Superior Court Judge Nelson Johnson dismissed the claims because the appearance standards were lawful. He also determined that the women could return to court for their claims of a hostile environment created by the management.

==== Doe v. Boeing Corporation (1993) ====
Doe, a transgender person beginning gender transition, found that her supervisors at the engineering company, Boeing Corporation, were uncooperative with her desire to wear feminine presenting clothing to work. She was warned against wearing, "obviously feminine clothing such as dresses, skirts, or frilly blouses" and from using the women's bathroom. This was even after her counselor recommended that wearing female presenting clothing would help with her transition. After a few warnings from her supervisors, Doe showed up to work wearing a pink pantsuit and was subsequently fired for violating the dress code. This prompted Doe to legal action. The Washington State Supreme Court ultimately upheld the decision made by Boeing and stated that the company had the right to determine what female identity looked like while at work.

==== Equal Employment Opportunity Commission v. R.G. &. G.R Harris Funeral Homes, Inc. ====
Aimee Stephens, a transgender woman, worked at the R.G. &. G.R Harris Funeral Homes and originally was dressing as a stereotypical male following the funeral home's male attire, but Stephens had intended to transition to female attire to better suit her gender identity. Thomas Rost, the owner of the funeral home, fired Stephens for not presenting herself as a man and for dressing like a woman. Stephens opened a case at the Equal Employment Opportunity Commission, stating discrimination based on sex and gender but the district court sided with the funeral home stating, "that transgender status is not a protected trait under Title VII". In the Sixth Circuit Court of Appeals, it was ruled that Stephens was unlawfully fired based on sex discrimination, which does protect transgender people. The United States Supreme Court ruled in 2020 against firing someone for being homosexual or transgender, ruling that it was discrimination based on sex.

==== The CROWN Act ====
The CROWN act, standing for "create a respectful and open world for natural hair" is a California law that prohibits discrimination in the school and workplace based on the style or texture of one's hair. The act was created in 2019 by Dove and the CROWN Coalition in partnership with California's State Senator Holly J. Mitchel. After a study conducted by Dove to reveal the degree of workplace discrimination towards Black women, the data was used to spread awareness and elicit change for the act to be passed. CROWN continues to fight for this cause, with a recent work-study conducted in 2023 revealing that discrimination regarding hair texture still prevails. As of June 2023, 23 US states have enacted the CROWN act into law.

=== Formal wear ===
In Western countries, a "formal" dress code typically means coats for men and evening dresses for women. The most-formal dress code is a full-length ball or evening gowns with evening gloves for women and for men white tie, which also includes a tailcoat.

"Semi-formal" has a much less precise definition but typically means an evening jacket and tie for men (known as black tie) and a dress for women. A frilled or patterned white shirt is considered more formal than a plain white or black shirt, and a black bow tie is considered more formal than a plain black cravat, but all could be considered appropriate, depending upon the gala or wedding, when white, black, and blue were the only acceptable colors for weddings and gala events in the 20th century.

Many classical music venues, such as La Scala, in Milan, Italy, enforce a formal dress code: "no flip flops or tank tops allowed."

=== Weddings ===
Weddings across the world tend to be formal affairs. In Asian culture, women tend to wear red or similar dresses. In Europe and the Americas, the bride wears white silk, taffeta, lace, or other fancy-cloth dresses, while the bridesmaids and mothers of the bride and groom often wear pastel colors of the bride's choice. The groom, best man, and other groomsmen in many countries usually wear the most formal morning coat, tuxedo, or dinner jacket, depending upon the time of day. Even the flower girl or boy gets dressed up.

"Wedding Casual" defines yet another mode of dress, where guests dress respectfully, but not necessarily fancily. Weddings in the 21st century tend to attract more colorful clothing than traditionally in the past. Ethnically appropriate costumes, such as a kilt, turban, Barong tagalog, sari, or kinte cloth are also worn frequently.

=== Business casual ===
"Business casual" typically means not wearing neckties or suits, but wearing instead collared shirts, and trousers (not black, but more relaxed, including things such as corduroy).

Business casual dress is a popular workplace dress code that emerged in white-collar workplaces in Western countries in the 1990s, especially in the United States and Canada. Many information technology businesses in Silicon Valley were early adopters of this dress code. In contrast to formal business wear such as suits and neckties (the international standard business attire), the business casual dress code has no generally accepted definition; its interpretation differs widely among organizations and is often a cause of sartorial confusion among workers.

The job search engine Monster.com offers this definition, "In general, business casual means dressing professionally, looking relaxed, yet neat and pulled together." A more pragmatic definition is that business casual dress is the mid ground between formal business clothes and street clothes. Generally, neckties are excluded from business casual dress, unless worn in nontraditional ways. The acceptability of blue jeans and denim cloth clothing varies — some businesses consider them to be sloppy and informal.

=== Casual ===
"Casual" typically just means clothing for the torso, legs and shoes.

=== Vestments ===
In certain Christian and other religions, Vestments are worn by clergy, cantors, and acolytes. In denominations that follow a set liturgical cycle, that dress might vary by season or occasion; for example, for a funeral, the bishop may dictate that clergy to wear black garb with white stoles.

=== Unwritten rules ===
Because dress codes are frequently unwritten and unspoken, some neurodivergent people have difficulty finding individual codes for special events. They may overcompensate by dressing more formal than necessary to avoid any potential social conflict.

Young people joining the workforce often struggle with unclear definitions of formal and casual in different industries and individual companies.

== Education system ==
Many schools around the world implement dress codes in the school system to prevent students from wearing inappropriate clothing items to school and was thought to help influence a safer and more professional environment.

=== United States education ===
In 1996, then U.S. President Bill Clinton supported the idea of school uniforms by stating, "School uniforms are one step that may help break the cycle of violence, truancy and disorder by helping young students understand what really counts is what kind of people they are." Many school districts in the United States took up the idea. In all, 70 schools – comprising around 60,000 students – switched to school uniforms.

School uniforms have been used with several schools to teach students how to dress appropriately, and in cases it has worked, and has decreased distractions in the educational systems. School uniforms also have several other purposes: they are used to create conformity to social norms, increase school spirit, reduce peer bullying, and prevent discrimination based upon socioeconomic class.

One common criticism of school dress codes in the U.S. is that they infringe on students' right to self-expression. There have been many court cases regarding school dress code, the first being Tinker v. Des Moines Independent Community School District, which involved students wearing black armbands to protest the Vietnam war.

Within the educational system, the Federation supports professional dress code standards for all teachers.

==== Dress code violations ====
"Communicative" dress code violations are violations where the clothing has implications of hate, violence, gang-affiliation, etc. In cases where dress code rules in public school systems have been violated, courts repeatedly legitimise dress code discrimination based on gender. Amongst the transgender populations, gender based dress codes are primarily enforced against individuals who do not yet pass.

Students at multiple schools have protested gender discrimination in the application of dress codes.

==== Dress code backlash ====
Certain dress code restrictions in schools across North America have been accused of perpetuating sexist standards. In March 2014, a group of middle-school girls from Evanston, Illinois, protested their school's dress code, which prohibited them from wearing leggings to school under the pretense that it was "too distracting for boys." Thirteen-year-old student Sophie Hasty was quoted in the Evanston Review saying that "not being able to wear leggings because it's 'too distracting for boys' is giving us the impression we should be guilty for what guys do." In a Time magazine article covering the incident, Eliana Dockterman argued that teachers and administration in these schools are "walking the fine line between enforcing a dress code and slut shaming."

School dress codes seem to also be gender-biased towards young girls. In conducted interviews with middle school girls, one of them describing, "Guys are not the ones that they're looking out for. So they dress code girls, so guys don't get distracted. But they don't think that girls are going to get distracted by guys' shoulders."

On Monday, September 22, 2014, "about 100 pupils walked out of Bingham high school in South Jordan, Utah" after more than a dozen girls were turned away from a homecoming dance for wearing dresses which violated the dress code. "School staff allegedly lined up girls against a wall as they arrived and banished about two dozen for having dresses which purportedly showed too much skin and violated the rules." It is believed that this act was awkward and humiliating towards the female students, which spawned the walkouts.

In August 2021, one student's mother criticized her daughter's school for continuing to enforce clothing restrictions on girls while allowing students to opt out of mask-wearing during the COVID-19 pandemic.

There have been several issues with dress code backlash happening to several students, such as a 15-year-old girl who attended Edmonton High school. She was banned from attending her school due to dying her hair blue. This resulted in the girl suing her principal for discrimination. In another case, a 16-year-old girl was sent home because she refused to take her eyebrow ring out.

=== Canadian education ===
Violation of dress codes have become a subject of Canadian school protests, such as at a high school in Toronto, which had a protest after a student was disciplined for wearing a crop top.

A Canadian teenager, Lauren Wiggins, was given detention in May 2015 for wearing a floor-length dress with a halter neckline. The punishment prompted Wiggins to write an open letter to the school's assistant vice principal at Harrison Trimble High School in Moncton, New Brunswick. In the letter, Wiggins concentrated specifically on the fact that females are often blamed for the behaviour of males, saying that if a boy "will get distracted by my upper back and shoulders then he needs to be sent home and practice self-control." She was then given a one-day suspension after writing and submitting the letter.

In Ontario, Canada, there were a few backlash incidents that occurred which consisted of girls being sent home due to wearing shorts that were too short. The other case happened in British Columbia where students were directed to wear clothes that were in good taste, and clothing that displayed a business look. In another case in British Columbia, a young woman was sent home from her high school, because her principal stated that her shirt was inappropriate due to the show of too much cleavage. These are a few of the many cases that have resulted in a backlash against dress codes.

=== Academic dress ===
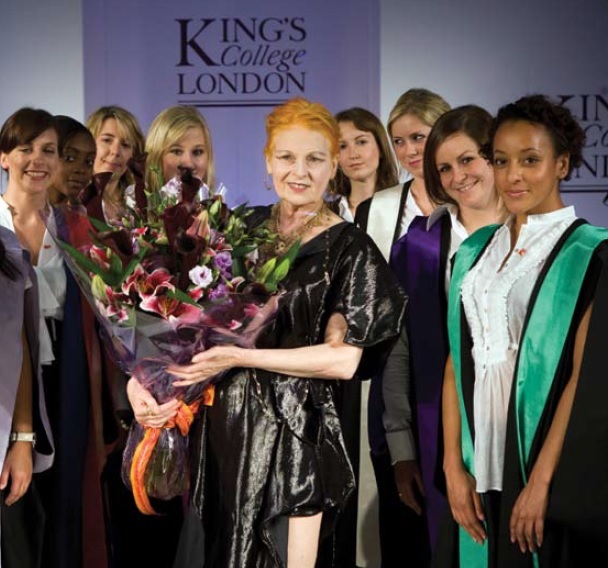
Academic dress of King's College London in different colours, designed and presented by fashion designer Vivienne Westwood

Academic dress is a traditional form of clothing for academic settings, mainly tertiary (and sometimes secondary) education, worn mainly by those who have obtained a university degree, or hold a status that entitles them to assume them (e.g., undergraduate students at certain old universities). It is also known as academical dress, or academic regalia.

=== Académie Française ===
The Académie Française has a distinctive and expensive set of formal wear or uniform required for its members les immortels, known as l'habit vert, or green clothing.

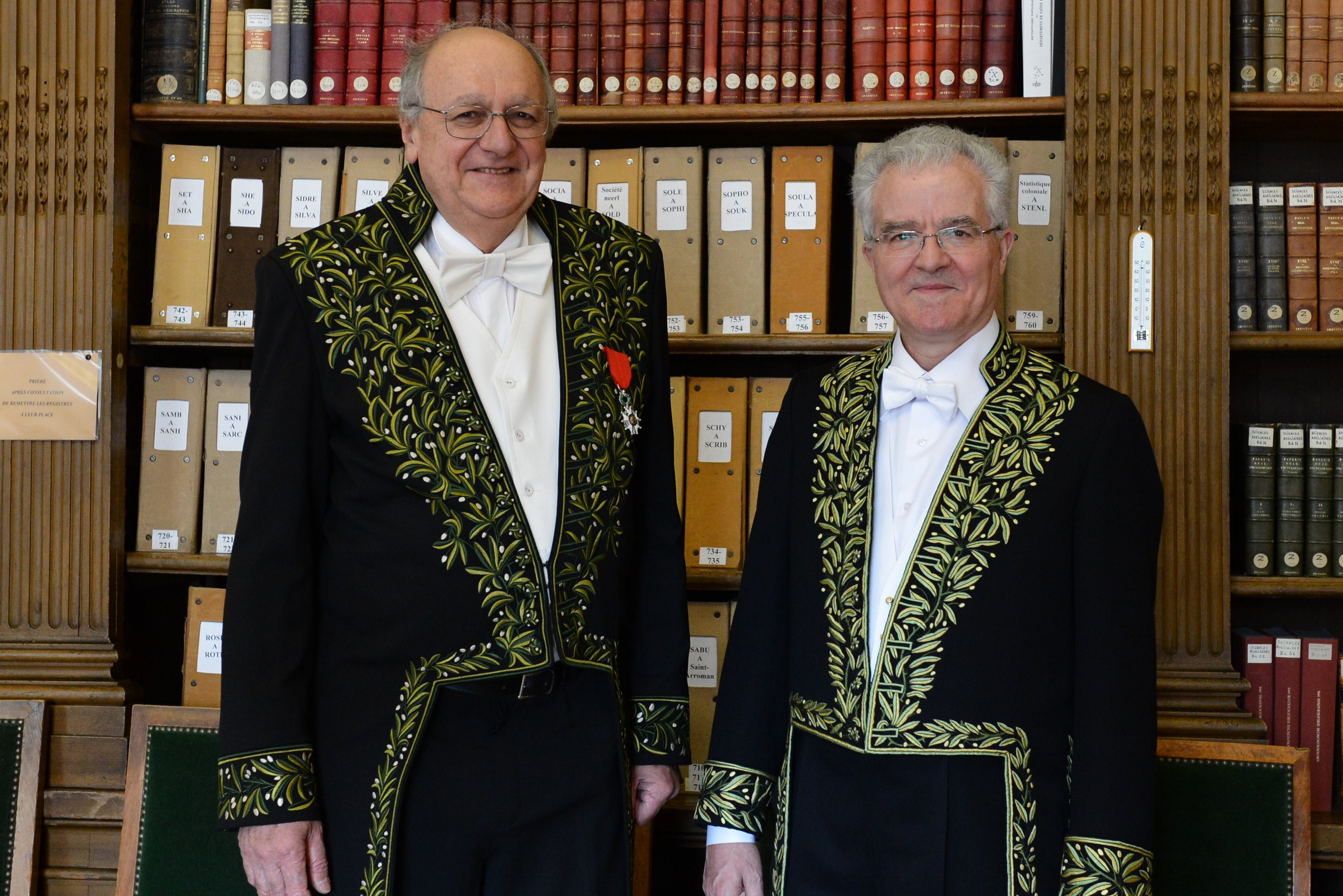
Bernard Dujon and his colleague Eric Westhof, wearing the "Habit vert" of the Institut de France

== Expense and access ==
One of the most significant criticisms about dress codes is the expense to purchase particular items. An academic gown, tuxedo, or prom dress can cost $1,000, while bespoke l'habit vert can cost $20,000.

The criticism of costliness can be pushed back by some ways that the expense is alleviated. First, the cost of buying and maintaining school uniforms is often much lower than buying multiple, fashionable brand-name outfits. Secondly, thrift stores often sell lightly used clothes such as suits, dresses, and ties, for a fraction of the cost and with the knowledge that the customer is both helping the charity (such as a church, Goodwill Industries, or Housing Works) that sells the items, and the environment, by not buying fast fashion. Thirdly, a few items can be mixed and matched with khakis and a Navy blazer:

I find that if I wear a chino with one of three shirts – a white oxford, a blue chambray, or a dark rinse denim – that carries me through so many looks.

— James E. Mulholland, designer

Finally, some people will host a fundraiser, for example, to purchase l'habit vert.

== See also ==
- Clothing laws by country
- Clothing sizes
- Cosmetics policy
- Costume
- Double empathy problem
- Full dress
- Dandy
- Dress clothes
- Fashion Theory
- Great Male Renunciation
- Haute couture
- Hemline
- High heel policy
- History of fashion design
- Income segregation
- Indian wedding clothes
- Nonverbal communication
- Quiet luxury
- School uniform
- Semiotics
- Smart casual
- Social norm
- Social role of hair
- Subculture
- Sumptuary law
- Uniform
- Uniform fetishism
- Unwritten rules
- Vanity sizing
- Western dress code
- Workwear
