= Jespersen v. Harrah's Operating Co. =

2002 United States legal case

Jespersen v. Harrah's
- Court: United States District Court for the District of Nevada
- Full case name: Jespersen v. Harrah's Operating Co., Inc.
- Decided: October 22, 2002
- Citation: 444 F.3d 1104; 94 Fair Empl. Prac. Cas. (BNA) 1812; 85 Empl. Prac. Dec. (CCH) P41,815

Case history
- Subsequent action: appealed to the 9th Circuit which affirmed the district court decision

Holding
- Dress and grooming policies which offer differing standards on the basis of sex are not discriminatory under Title VII of the Civil Rights act if it cannot be shown that the create an unreasonable burden.

Court membership
- Judges sitting: Mary M. Schroeder, Harry Pregerson, Alex Kozinski, Pamela Ann Rymer, Barry G. Silverman, Susan P. Graber, William A. Fletcher, Richard C. Tallman, Richard Clifton, Consuelo Callahan, and Carlos Bea

Keywords
- stereotyping; sex discrimination; employment law

Jespersen v. Harrah's Operating Co., 444 F.3d 1104 (9th Cir. Apr. 14, 2006) (en banc) was a United States federal employment law sex discrimination case.

Darlene Jespersen was a 20-year employee at Harrah's Casino in Reno, Nevada. In 2000, Harrah's advanced a "Personal Best" policy, which created strict standards for employee appearance and grooming, which included a requirement that women wear substantial amounts of makeup. Jespersen was fired for non-compliance with its policy. Jespersen argued the makeup requirement was contrary to her self-image, and that the requirement violated Title VII of the Civil Rights Act of 1964.

In 2001, Jespersen filed a lawsuit in United States District Court for the District of Nevada, which found against her claim. The district court opined that the policy imposed "equal burdens" on both sexes and that the policy did not discriminate based on immutable characteristics of her sex.

The United States Court of Appeals for the Ninth Circuit affirmed the decision, but on rehearing en banc, reversed part of its decision. The en banc majority's opinion was written by Chief Judge Mary M. Schroeder, over the dissent of Judges Harry Pregerson, Alex Kozinski, Susan P. Graber, and William A. Fletcher. The en banc court concluded, in contrast to the previous rulings, that such grooming requirements could be challenged as sex stereotyping in some cases, even in view of the decision in Price Waterhouse v. Hopkins. However, the majority found that Jespersen had not provided evidence that the policy had been motivated by stereotyping, and affirmed the district court's finding for Harrah's.

In Pregerson's dissent, he mentioned that a cultural assumption was used to justify gender discrimination, and the gender discrimination is evidence in itself.

Pregerson: "Just as the bank in Carroll deemed female employees incapable of achieving a professional appearance without assigned uniforms, Harrah's regarded women as unable to achieve a neat, attractive, and professional appearance without the facial uniform designed by a consultant and required by Harrah's. The inescapable message is that women's undoctored faces compare unfavorably to men's, not because of a physical difference between men's and women's faces, but because of a cultural assumption—and gender-based stereotype—that women's faces are incomplete, unattractive, or unprofessional without full makeup. We need not denounce all makeup as inherently offensive, just as there was no need to denounce all uniforms as inherently offensive in Carroll, to conclude that requiring female bartenders to wear full makeup is an impermissible sex stereotype and is evidence of discrimination because of sex. Therefore, I strongly disagree with the majority's conclusion that there "is no evidence in this record to indicate that the policy was adopted to make women bartenders conform to a commonly-accepted stereotypical image of what women should wear." Maj. Op. at 1112.

Alex Kozinski, in dissent, wrote that quality employees are hard to find, and that Harrah's let go of a valued worker over a trivial matter. He also reasoned that it was obviously sex discrimination, due to the fact that makeup costs money and takes time.

Kozinski: "It is true that Jespersen failed to present evidence about what it costs to buy makeup and how long it takes to apply it. But is there any doubt that putting on makeup costs money and takes time? Harrah's policy requires women to apply face powder, blush, mascara and lipstick. You don't need an expert witness to figure out that such items don't grow on trees."

"But those of us not used to wearing makeup would find a requirement that we do so highly intrusive. Imagine, for example, a rule that all judges wear face powder, blush, mascara and lipstick while on the bench."

"Finally, I note with dismay the employer's decision to let go a valued, experienced employee who had gained accolades from her customers, over what, in the end, is a trivial matter. Quality employees are difficult to find in any industry and I would think an employer would long hesitate before forcing a loyal, long-time employee to quit over an honest and heartfelt difference of opinion about a matter of personal significance to her. Having won the legal battle, I hope that Harrah's will now do the generous and decent thing by offering Jespersen her job back, and letting her give it her personal best—without the makeup."

== See also ==
- Cosmetics policy
- Gender-based dress codes
- High heel policy
