= Yumi Ishikawa =

Japanese actress, model, and writer (born 1987)

- 石川 優実
- Born: 1 January 1987 (age 38); Komaki, Aichi Prefecture, Japan
- Occupation(s): Actress, model, writer

Yumi Ishikawa (石川 優実, Ishikawa Yumi; born 1 January 1987) is a Japanese actress, model, political activist and writer. She is a founder of the KuToo movement. In 2019, she was included on the BBC's 100 Women list.

== Early life ==
Born on 1 January 1987 in Komaki, Aichi Prefecture, Ishikawa grew up in Tajimi, Gifu Prefecture.

== Career ==
In 2004, Ishikawa started her career as a gravure idol. She has since then released more than 30 image DVDs and won the Cream Girl competition. She started acting in 2008. In 2014, she starred in the film Onna no Ana. She has also appeared in films such as Yuwaku wa Arashi no Yoru ni and Itsuka no Natsu.

== KuToo movement ==
In January 2019, Ishikawa wrote a complaint about the requirement to wear high heels at work, which was shared nearly 30,000 times on Twitter. She launched an online petition to call for a law that bans employers from forcing women to wear high heels. The name of the KuToo movement derives from the Japanese words for shoes (kutsu) and pain (kutsū), as well as the Me Too movement. In June 2019, Ishikawa submitted the petition to the Ministry of Health, Labour and Welfare.

== Recognition ==
In October 2019, Ishikawa was included on the BBC's annual 100 Women list.

== Filmography ==
=== Feature films ===
- Onna no Ana (2014)
- Yuwaku wa Arashi no Yoru ni (2016)
- Itsuka no Natsu (2018)

== Books ==
- #KuToo (2019) ISBN 9784768458686

=== Photo books ===
- Act.1 (2014) ISBN 9784812489239
- Watashi no Naka no Akuma (2015) ISBN 9784801905740
