= Chopine =

Shoe or overshoe with a thick platform sole

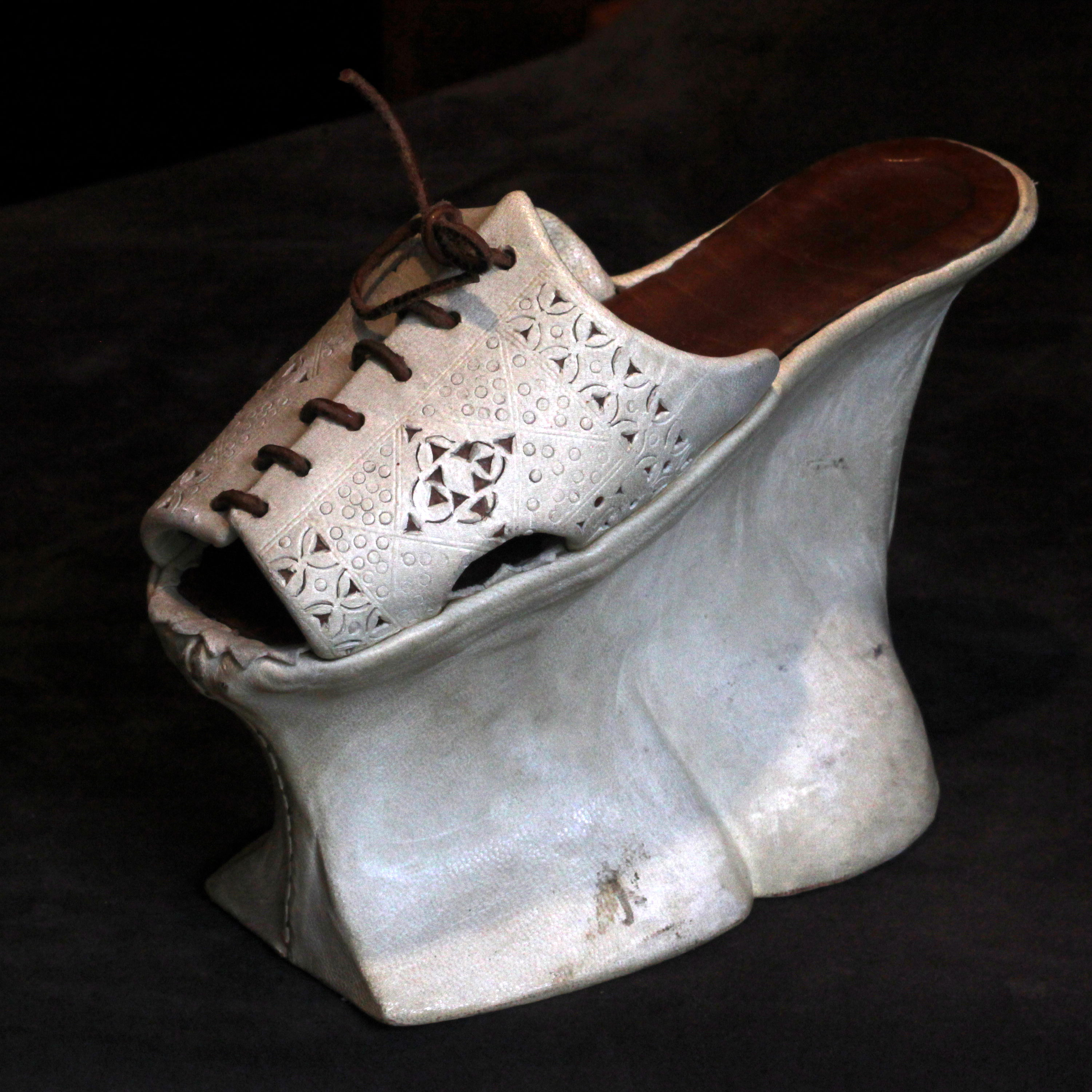
Reconstruction of a 16th-century Venetian chopine. On display at the Shoe Museum in Lausanne.

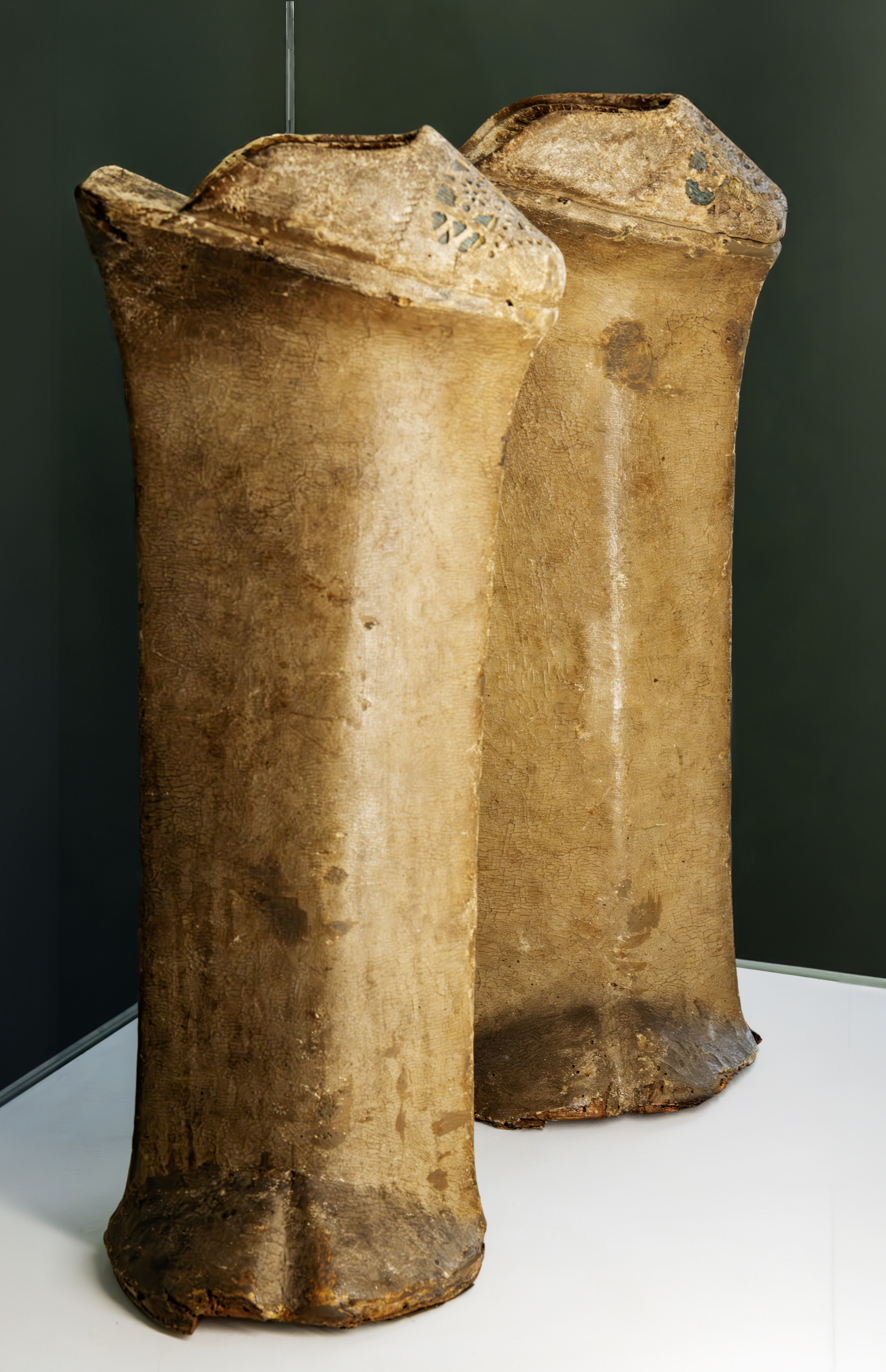
Calcagnetti (Chopine)- Correr Museum

A chopine is a type of women's platform shoe that was popular in the 15th, 16th and 17th centuries. Chopines were originally used as a patten, clog, or overshoe to protect shoes and dresses from mud and street soil.

== History and popularity ==
In Venice both courtesans and patrician women frequently wore chopines c. 1400 to 1700. Besides practical uses, the height of the chopine became a symbolic reference to the cultural and social standing of the wearer; the higher the chopine, the higher the status of the wearer. High chopines allowed a woman to tower over others. During the Renaissance, chopines became an article of women's fashion and were made increasingly taller; some extant examples exceed 50 cm (20 inches) in height. In the 15th century, chopines were also in style in Spain. Their popularity in Spain was so great that the larger part of the country's cork supplies went towards production of the shoes.

Some argue that the style originated in Spain, as there are many extant examples and a great amount of pictorial and written reference going back to the 14th century. Chopines of the Spanish style were more often conical and symmetric, while their Venetian counterparts are much more artistically carved. That is not to say, however, that Spanish chopines were not adorned; on the contrary, there is evidence of jeweling, gilt lettering along the surround (the material covering the cork or wooden base), tooling, and embroidery on Spanish chopines. The tallest extant chopines are in the Museo Correr in Venice, Italy.

In 1430 a Venetian law limited the height of chopines to three inches, but this regulation was widely ignored. Shakespeare joked about the extreme height of the chopines in style in his day by using the word altitude (Hamlet 2.2, the prince greets one of the visiting players – the adolescent boy who would have played the female parts in the all-male troupe – by noting how much "nearer to heaven" the lad had grown since he last saw him "by the altitude of a chopine").

== Surviving examples ==
Surviving chopines are typically made of wood or cork, and those in the Spanish style were sometimes banded about with metal. Extant pieces are covered with leather, brocades, or jewel-embroidered velvet. Often, the fabric of the chopine matched the dress or the shoe, but not always. Despite being highly decorated, chopines often remained hidden under the wearer's skirt, unavailable for any critical observation, but the design of the shoes caused the wearer to have a very "comical walk".

== Practical difficulties ==
According to some scholars, chopines caused an unstable and inelegant gait. Noblewomen wearing them might need two servants in order to walk around safely - her ladyship could support herself on the servants' shoulders. Other scholars have argued that with practice a woman could walk and even dance gracefully. In his dancing manual Nobilità di dame (1600), the Italian dancing-master Fabritio Caroso writes that with care a woman practised in wearing her chopines could move "with grace, seemliness, and beauty" and even "dance flourishes and galliard variations". Chopines were usually put on with the help of two servants.

== Cognates ==
There are a great many cognates of the word "chopine" ("chapiney", "choppins", etc.). The term chopine itself appears to come from Old Spanish chapín via Middle French. (Neither the word "chopine" nor any word similar to it (chioppino, cioppino, etc.) appears in Florio's Italian/English dictionaries of either 1598 or 1611. The Renaissance Italian equivalent, instead, seems to be zoccolo (English plural: clogs), which likely comes from the Italian word zocco, meaning a stump or a block of wood. Florio does, however, use the word "chopinos" in his English definition of zoccoli.)

== See also ==
- Geta (footwear) – Traditional Japanese open-topped wooden sandals
- List of shoe styles
