= Income segregation =

Income segregation is the separation of various classes of people based on their income. For example, certain people cannot get into country clubs because of insufficient funds. Another example of income segregation in a neighborhood would be the schools, facilities and the characteristics of a population. Income segregation can be illustrated in countries such as the United States, where racial segregation is a major cause of income inequality.

Income segregation is associated with greater inequality in educational attainment between classes. Income segregation is highly correlated with income inequality, racial segregation and segregation of poverty and affluence. Also, the correlation of the income segregation between schools has been documented and is an increasing trend with little or no exception.

Income segregation is also dependent on other variables which are observable within society – income inequality, spatial segregation of affluence and poverty (which describes the isolation of the upper- or low-income households and other classes), and racial segregation. Also, inequality within the educational system of a given class is associated to so extend with the income segregation.

The importance of measuring income segregation is given by the different redistribution of outcomes across the society, uneven within different income classes. For the upper-income classes these differences can even be positive, often giving them better social and educational background or more pleasing environments in their metropolitan area. These neighborhoods can make themselves better off in comparison to lower-income ones, mostly due to public policy (and the difference among the tax base each class pays). As a result, income segregation expands because upper-income communities have these advantages and benefit from them.

Metropolitan income segregation in the US grew constantly between 1970 and 2000; it was fastest in the 1980s. The growth was stronger for Black families than white ones as well as the covariance of income inequality and the segregation of poverty and affluence.

== In context ==
=== Income segregation and income inequality ===
Income inequality is a necessary condition for income segregation. If there were no income inequality, neighborhoods would possess the same opportunities and conditions and thus no income segregation would likely occur. However, it is important to recognize that the relationship between income segregation and income inequality can be affected by many different factors.

Based on research, income inequality itself does not create income segregation – the presence of income-correlated residential preferences, and an income-based housing market and/or housing policies is crucial.

An increase in inequality in the US from 1970 to 1990 resulted in an increase in income segregation. Also, an increase in income segregation in economic school segregation is highly dependent on income inequality (as well as the role of educational policies).

Income segregation (as well as racial segregation) is stronger in the public educational system than in the private system, especially in primary education. This is usually explained by the neighborhood (metropolitan area) where schools are located. This can be due to the fact that regardless of one's financial background, anyone can attend a public school; therefore, a broader range of people will study at a public school. The relationship between income segregation and income inequality is complex: its results can be influenced by local political, economic, and city planning agendas, which can either work for or against the fight with income segregation and income inequality.

=== Income inequality and the Lorenz curve ===
The Lorenz curve was taken up by the American statistician Max Lorenz to study the income problem. In the Lorenz curve method, firstly, the number of consumer units in various income brackets and their income is evaluated. They are then divided into percentages that rank the consumer units from the lowest to the highest income. Opposite each percentage, the share of this group in national income is shown as a percentage. Finally, a table showing both consumer units and national income in percentages is drawn up, and the data is placed in a diagram. The diagrammatic expression resulting from this process is called the Lorenz curve. On this curve, the percentage of consumer units lined up on the horizontal axis from the least income to the highest income is shown cumulatively. If the percentages that different groups receive from income are marked on the diagram and the marked points are connected, a curve showing the income distribution of the economy is obtained. In the curve diagram showing this income distribution, the inequality in income distribution decreases as it approaches the line drawn by forming an angle of 45 degrees, and the inequality in income distribution increases as it gets farther away.

=== Income inequality and the segregation of poverty and affluence ===
Income inequality affects income segregation. Among low-income households the difference between incomes do not significantly vary. Thus, income inequality is generally stronger among high-income households – i.e., upper-tail income inequality. In other words, there is little or no significant impact of the income inequality on income segregation among low-income households. It means that for moderate or high-income households it is more probable that they would not be able to afford to live in the same neighborhood (on the contrary to low-income households). Thus upper-tail income inequality leads to greater segregation of affluence and not necessarily to greater segregation of poverty.

Even though the segregation of the affluence is stronger, the research shows that it remains stable over the years (on the contrary to the other types).

=== Racial differences and income segregation ===
Metropolitan income segregation also differs among races due to historical racial discrimination, when fewer residential options were available for black households in comparison to the white household of the same income level and wealth; then an expansion in housing options occurred in the late 20th century. This resulted in a stronger correlation between income inequality and income segregation among black families than among white families during this period. For example, studies show in the US between the 1970s and 1980s that income segregation among black families grew more than three times faster than among white families.

== Measurement ==
There are multiple options of measuring income segregation even though they are much less developed and each of them include some advantages as well as disadvantages. Many studies use dissimilarity index (unlike when measuring racial segregation) – whose possible disadvantage is the substantial loss of information. The variation of the dissimilarity index is the overall economic segregation index. This index is based on the seven variables based on the income, educational and occupational measures and out of these measures the overall economic segregation is calculated. Another possibility for measuring income segregation is the use of a ratio of the between-neighborhood variation in mean income to the total variation of income, one of the variation of this approach is a centile gap index (segregation is equal to one minus the ratio of the within-neighborhood variation in income percentile rank to the overall variation in percentile rank), Bourguignon's income inequality index or Jargowsky's Neighborhoods Sorting Index – i.e., to the square root of the ratio of the between-unit income variance to the total income variance.

Rank-order theory index is the ratio of within-unit income rank variation to overall income rank variation. This approach allows to measure this type of segregation even if the precise threshold of the income is unknown and we choose only based on the percentiles. This index can be utilized as a way to go around the difficulty of examining the relationship between income inequality and income segregation. The index varies between 0 and 1. The rank-order will be 0 if income segregation does not exist, illustrating that the income distribution in each neighborhood is identical to that of the city.If the rank-order will be 1, the case will be the opposite where income segregation does exist, and neighborhoods are divided based on their income rank.

Residential Income Segregation Index is one of the more precise measuring methods for summarizing the income segregation. It was developed by Richard Fry and Paul Taylor. As the name indicates, it focuses on the income segregation given by the residential possibilities. According to a research paper, it takes into account the highest 30 metropolitan regions for each country. The highest that the Residential Income Segregation Index can be is 200. Additionally, the residential income segregation index sums the percentage of poorer households living in a largely poorer area and the percentage of richer households living in a largely richer area. The following three metropolitan regions were recorded as having the biggest degrees of income segregation: Dallas, New York and Houston. This could be due to immigration as it led to increased population growth. The following three metropolitan regions were recorded as having the lowest degrees of income segregation: Atlanta, Chicago and Boston.

The spacial ordering index is based on the concept of spacial ordering and measurements derived from it. It is a way of describing and comparing different income levels in a given neighborhood with its physical location. This should provide a map and reveal some relationships between certain locations and income levels. there are several ways to approach spacial ordering, such as the "Nearest Neighbor Spatial Ordering", or the "Monocentric Spatial Ordering". Dawkins proposes his way of calculating the Spatial Ordering Index, originally derived as a ratio between the spatial Gini index and the income segregation Gini index. Dawkins proposes a new method of substituting these two coefficients by two "Covariance based formulas" based on parameters, such as different types of Aggregate household income of a neighborhood and region, average rank and spatial rank of income of a given neighborhood.

Some of these approaches require the measurement of income inequality first for which the Gini index (Gini coefficient) is most widely use. If the value of the index is equal 0, perfect equality occurs. Perfect equality is where all have the same portion. On the contrary, when the value if the index is equal to 1, perfect inequality is observed within the society. Perfect inequality is where either one person or group receives the whole share of income. In other words, the higher the Gini coefficient, the higher the degree of inequality. The Gini index is an assessment of income inequality, as it summarizes the entire data set into one statistic and it is able to represent the division of income whilst considering the whole income distribution. The Gini coefficient takes the Lorenz curve and the perfect equality income distribution into account.

== Income segregation in the US and Brazil ==
Income segregation in the US is a direct result of rising income inequality since the 1970s, where today the difference in income of a 90th percentile family is nearly ten-fold from a family of 10th percentile in income distribution, as opposed to a six-fold difference in 1970. One of the manifestations of this phenomenon is an increase in residential income segregation, where in 1970, 66% of families lived in middle-class neighborhoods and by 2007, that number decreased to 43%. The rapid disappearance of middle-class neighborhoods is one of the indicators that middle-class itself is disappearing as well. In the United States, a black household will earn 42 percent less than a white household on average.

When it comes to lowering the income difference, it requires that racial segregation also gets decreased. The United States is definitely studied rigorously when it comes to the study of segregation and racial inequality. Black Americans, however, have not been included in the move towards America's economic growth. In America, there is a substantial difference in unemployment between blacks and whites: to be exact, unemployment among black people is 6% compared to 3.1% among white people (the data was collected prior to the COVID-19 pandemic). Another illustration of segregation in the US is the difference in median household income among black people and white people: a median black household income would be $40,258, compared to $68,145 earned by a median white household income (these figures are from 2017).

Brazil is one the most affected countries by income inequality (as well as other economic inequalities), before it was affected by COVID-19. According to research that was done during the COVID-19 pandemic, it was concluded that there is a link between higher COVID-19 mortality rates and increased inequality factors (such as income inequality and income segregation). Mixed linear models and the Gini index were used in this research. The Gini Index is talked about further below. It was also found that the variability of COVID-19 mortality rates got lowered as you went from the cities to the states. It can be noted that even before the COVID-19 pandemic, Brazil was already being affected by socioeconomic factors that further exaggerated income inequality and income segregation already.

== Importance ==
Income segregation is an important characteristic of the community indicating possible differences among households of varying income levels. High-income classes usually possess more cultural, educational, and political benefits. Thus, a child born in a low-income family is likely to make less than one born in a high-income household. It is vital to understand income segregation in order to tackle income inequality. Additionally, income segregation can result in increasing the difference in outcomes depending on whether they come from a rich or poor household.

Income segregation is even more prevalent in the US than in other developed countries. Proposals have been made to help to reduce the income segregation, such as the integration of disadvantaged families into mixed-income communities. This could help to reduce generational poverty in these disadvantaged households.

The economic crisis between the years 2007-2011 also had an impact on the trend of economic segregation.

Seeing the illustration of income segregation can be significant for multiple reasons. Firstly, it shows the economic societal differences or inequality, which largely impact social and political issues. Due to the existence of income segregation, it causes separated neighborhoods to form, with wealthier individuals living in their own communities with higher incomes. Income segregation can also exacerbate issues. These issues can be the unequal opportunities with a lower access to goods and services as well as restricted social mobility. It can also add to the marginalization of targeted groups, increasing discrimination and contributes to the amplification of stereotypes. Additionally, income segregation can slow down economic growth as there is less space for innovation and entrepreneurship due to certain groups being disadvantaged. Furthermore, higher crime rates and lowered social cohesion can result from income segregation.

== See also ==
- Classism
- Dress code
- Exclusionary zoning
- Paul Fussell
- Poll tax
- Poor door
- Redlining
