= Jaimie Veale =

New Zealand psychologist

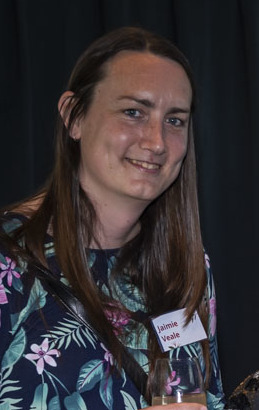
- Veale in 2020
- Education: Massey University
- Scientific career
- Fields: Psychology
- Workplaces: University of Waikato
- Thesis: Biological and psychosocial correlates of gender variant and gender-typical identities (2011)

Jaimie F Veale is a Canadian-New Zealand psychology academic, and as of 2021 is a senior lecturer at the University of Waikato.

== Academic career ==
Veale has a master's degree from Massey University, completed in 2005. After a 2011 PhD titled Biological and psychosocial correlates of gender-variant and gender-typical identities also at Massey University, Veale moved to the University of British Columbia in Vancouver, Canada for three years, before returning to New Zealand and the University of Waikato.

In 2017, Veale was funded to research transgender health and "the first comprehensive research project into the health and wellbeing of trans and non-binary people in New Zealand".

In 2019–2021, Veale and her work supported changes in the Births, Deaths, Marriages, and Relationships Registration Bill to make it easier for people to change the details on their birth certificates.

In 2021, Veale gave a Radio New Zealand interview about the anti-trans backlash to weightlifter Laurel Hubbard representing New Zealand at the 2020 Olympics, in which she described the response as an attempt to deny trans people their human rights. A complaint was laid with the Broadcasting Standards Agency, but it was not upheld. Veale is researching the media coverage of Hubbard.

== Selected works ==
- Veale, Jaimie F. (4 March 2014). "Edinburgh Handedness Inventory – Short Form: A revised version based on confirmatory factor analysis". Laterality. 19 (2): 164–177. doi:10.1080/1357650X.2013.783045. ISSN 1357-650X. PMID 23659650.
- Veale, Jaimie F.; Watson, Ryan J.; Peter, Tracey; Saewyc, Elizabeth M. (1 January 2017). "Mental Health Disparities Among Canadian Transgender Youth". Journal of Adolescent Health. 60 (1): 44–49. doi:10.1016/j.jadohealth.2016.09.014. ISSN 1054-139X. PMC 5630273. PMID 28007056.
- Veale, Jaimie, Elizabeth M. Saewyc, Hélène Frohard-Dourlent, Sarah Dobson, and Beth Clark. "Being safe, being me: Results of the Canadian trans youth health survey." (2015).
- Watson, Ryan J.; Veale, Jaimie F.; Saewyc, Elizabeth M. (2017). "Disordered eating behaviors among transgender youth: Probability profiles from risk and protective factors". International Journal of Eating Disorders. 50 (5): 515–522. doi:10.1002/eat.22627. ISSN 1098-108X. PMC 5754211. PMID 27862124.
- Clark, Beth A., Jaimie F. Veale, Marria Townsend, Hélène Frohard-Dourlent, and Elizabeth Saewyc. "Non-binary youth: Access to gender-affirming primary health care." International Journal of Transgenderism 19, no. 2 (2018): 158–169.
- Veale, Jaimie F.; Peter, Tracey; Travers, Robb; Saewyc, Elizabeth M. (December 2017). "Enacted Stigma, Mental Health, and Protective Factors Among Transgender Youth in Canada". Transgender Health. 2 (1): 207–216. doi:10.1089/trgh.2017.0031. ISSN 2688-4887. PMC 5734137. PMID 29279875.
