= Gender-based dress codes =

Standards of dress associated with gender

Gender-based dress codes are dress codes that establish separate standards of clothing and grooming for men and women. These dress codes may also contain specifications related to the wearing of cosmetics and heels and the styling of hair. Gender-based dress codes are commonly enforced in workplaces and educational institutions. Dress codes with gendered requirements may disproportionately impact workers and students who are women, gender nonconforming, transgender, or non-binary.

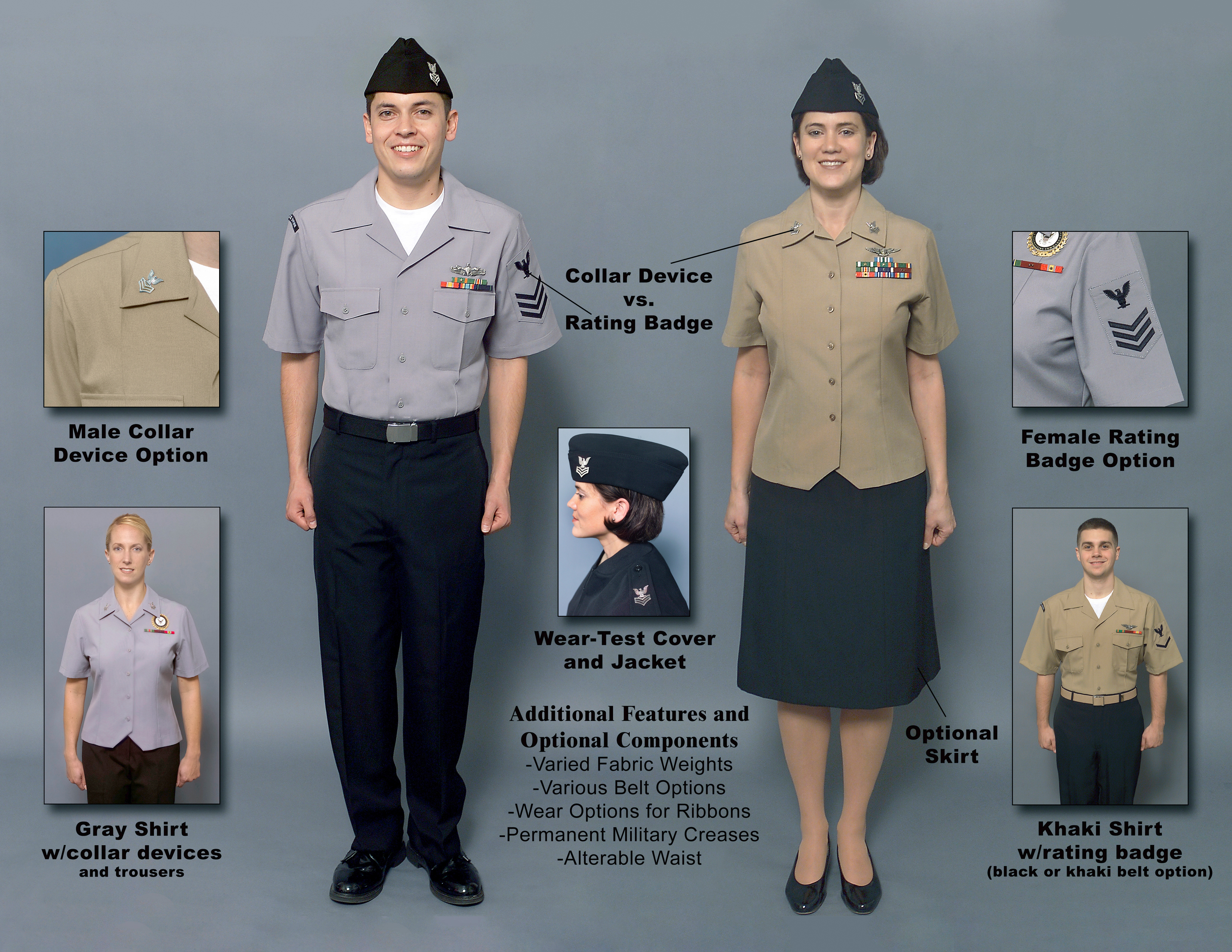
Concept for men's and women's U.S navy service uniforms (2004)

== About ==
LGBT rights organizations have advised against mandatory gender-based dress codes. According to the Human Rights Campaign (HRC), "If an employer has a dress code, it should modify it to avoid gender stereotypes and enforce it consistently." The HRC lists policies requiring women to wear skirts or men to wear pants as an example of a dress code that reinforces gender stereotypes.

== Canada ==
Gender-based dress codes are considered a form of sex discrimination in Ontario. According to the Ontario Human Rights Commission, "sexualized" or "gender-specific" dress codes may harm women, reinforce gender stereotypes, and exclude transgender people and other marginalized groups.

During the 2010s and 2020s, public and private school students in Quebec have protested against gender-based dress codes that disproportionately impact female students. In 2020, male students at several Quebec high schools wore skirts to protest dress code restrictions that singled out female students.

== United States ==
Federal courts in the United States have generally ruled that gender-based dress codes do not constitute sex discrimination. Mandatory gender-based dress codes in the workplace have been referred to as a "Title VII blind spot" by Jessica Robinson, writing for the Nebraska Law Review. In Price Waterhouse v. Hopkins (1989), the US Supreme Court ruled that "sex-role stereotyping" may constitute sex discrimination in a mixed motivation Title XII case. The plaintiff in the case, Ann Hopkins, had been denied a promotion because the firm believed Hopkins did not walk or talk or behave in a feminine enough fashion, including not wearing enough makeup. The Supreme Court ruled 9-3 that Hopkins had been subjected to illegal sex discrimination under Title VII of the Civil Rights Act of 1964.

=== Clothing ===
==== Workplaces ====
Some states explicitly protect the right of women workers to wear pants at work. California law states that "It shall be an unlawful employment practice for an employer to refuse to permit an employee to wear pants on account of the sex of the employee."

According to the California Civil Rights Department, dress codes are permitted in the workplace but "all employees must be held to the same standard, regardless of their gender identity or expression".

The New York State Division of Human Rights has stated that a workplace or "restaurant cannot impose a dress code that has different requirements based on gender" and "cannot insist that a woman wear a dress rather than a jacket and tie."

==== Schools ====
The District of Columbia Public Schools document on "Transgender and Gender-Nonconforming Policy Guidance" states that dress codes are permitted in public schools, but they must be gender-neutral. The New York City Department of Education stipulates that dress codes must be gender-neutral.

=== Cosmetics ===
Gender-based dress codes may require women to wear cosmetics or forbid men from wearing them. In Jespersen v. Harrah's Operating Co. (2006), the 9th Circuit Court of Appeals ruled that it was not sex discrimination for a casino in Nevada to fire a woman worker who choose not to wear makeup to work.

=== Hair ===
While initially divided, federal courts in the United States have subsequently unanimously ruled that separate hair lengths for men and women do not constitute sex discrimination under Title VII. However, the Equal Employment Opportunity Commission has concluded that "absent a showing of a business necessity" separate grooming standards for men and women do constitute sex discrimination under Title VII. The EEOC has ruled that male workers may sue if discriminated against on the basis of sex for having long hair.

Women in the workplace with facial hair may experience difficulties that men with facial hair may not experience. In 1994, a woman in Tysons, Virginia, was fired from her job at a Ritz-Carlton hotel for having a moustache. Following her complaint to the Equal Employment Opportunity Commission, the worker's job was reinstated and the hotel issued an apology.

== See also ==
- Beard and haircut laws by country
- Clothing laws by country
- Cosmetics policy
- Cross-dressing
- Gender neutrality
- High heel policy
- Men's skirts
- Topfreedom
- Trousers as women's clothing
