= High heel policy =

Regulation or law about the wearing of high heels

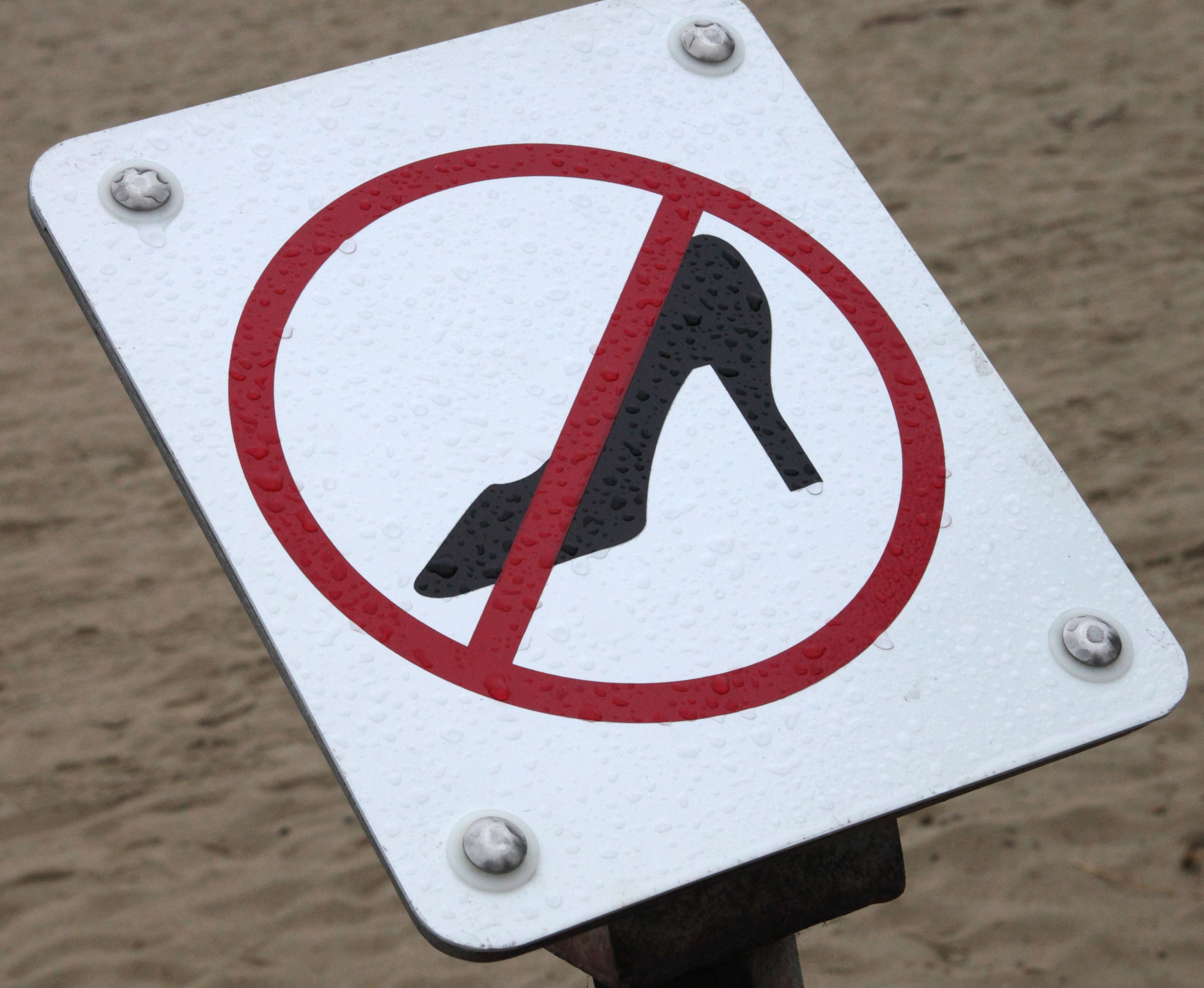
High heels have been restricted by law and policy in various places such as schools, museums, and localities such as Mobile, Alabama. In this case, the sign forbids them on Stearns Wharf in Santa Barbara, California.

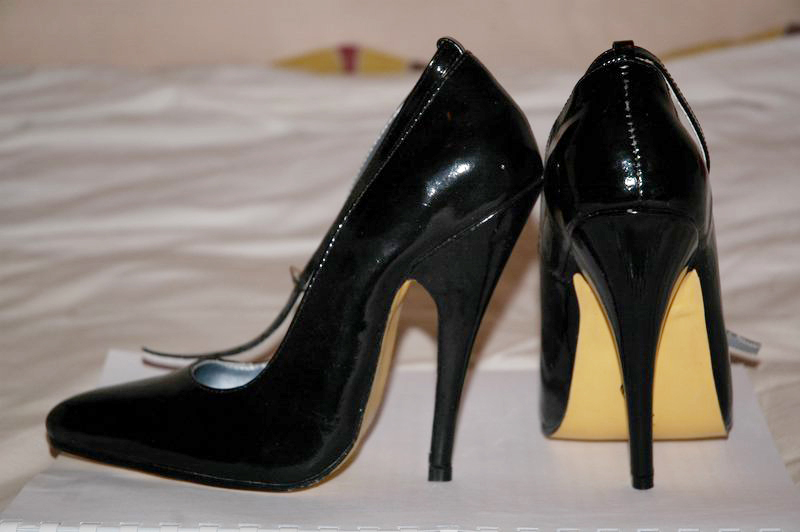
A pair of pumps/court shoes with 12 cm (4 3/4 inches) stiletto heels

A high heel policy is a regulation or law about the wearing of high heels, which may be required or forbidden in different places and circumstances.

Historically in the West high heels were associated with aristocrats for cosmetic reasons, to emphasize social status among an elite who could afford to wear impractical footwear, to raise their height, or to keep feet and long dresses clean. The style was then subject to sumptuary laws. In more modern times, stiletto heels have been restricted when they might damage the floor surface or cause accidents.

Some dress codes, however, require women to wear high heels so that they appear to be taller and more attractive. Such footwear may be painful and damage the feet, and there have been repeated protests by women workers against such policies. In 2016, a British receptionist, Nicola Thorp, stated that she was sent home unpaid for not wearing high heels, and she then started a petition which attracted sufficient support to be considered by the UK Parliament, though it was eventually rejected in April 2017 as the government stated that existing legislation was "adequate".

== Regulations preventing the wearing of high heels ==
=== In history ===
In 1430, chopines were 30 inches (76 cm) high, at times. Venetian law then limited the height to three inches—but this regulation was widely ignored. A 17th-century law in Massachusetts announced that women would be subjected to the same treatment as witches if they lured men into marriage via the use of high-heeled shoes. In 1770, an act was introduced into the British parliament which would have applied the same penalties as witchcraft to the use of high heels and other cosmetic devices.

=== Floor surface and safety concerns ===
The pressure under a stiletto heel is greater (per unit of the very small area) than that under the feet of an elephant. Thus, as the very narrow stiletto heel became more widespread in the 1950s, the owners of many types of buildings became concerned about the effects of large numbers of such heels on their floors, especially in historic and high-traffic public buildings. Specifically, there was concern that the heels would either damage certain types of floor covering or cause minor accidents through heels getting jammed in floor-grills, the gaps in planking, or uneven surfaces. Soft outdoor ground also caused problems, affecting both the surface and the wearer. Wood flooring was the most vulnerable, but carpets, linoleum, and mosaic floors were also considered at risk of damage. Signs were frequently posted attempting to ban stiletto heels, though they were generally ineffective. A 1963 article in a US building maintenance magazine stated, "Replacement of floors is estimated to have cost at least half a billion dollars throughout the country since the advent of the stiletto heel fashion." The U.S. Department of Agriculture Forest Service claimed in 1963 that "with style changes the stiletto-heel problem has diminished". In 2023, a gay club called Bunker opened in Washington, D.C., and it banned high heels, as well as open-toed shoes and flip flops, "for customer safety." However, this ban on high heels was dropped within a month, with the club's website stating instead of an outright ban, "Bunker welcomes the attire of all gender identities and expressions. However, Bunker is a dimly lit, underground dance club with concrete floors and steps. As a safety precaution, we strongly discourage the wearing of high heels. Open-toed shoes are prohibited."

High heels can represent contributory negligence by the plaintiff in American personal injury cases involving slip and fall accidents. Many high heel policies in the US are related to concerns over the potential for legal claims.

== Regulations requiring the wearing of high heels ==
=== In media and fashion ===
Some women have challenged the expectation that women should wear high heels in formal social situations. In 2015, a group of women were turned away from a film première at the Cannes Film Festival in France for wearing flat shoes, including a woman physically unable to wear heels due to an operation on one of her feet. The women complained that this was a sexist policy which forced women into a stereotyped appearance; festival organisers later responded that "the rumour that the festival requires high heels for the women on the steps [was] baseless."

=== In workplaces ===
Some dress codes require women to wear high heels, and some medical organizations have called for a ban on such dress codes. There have been repeated protests by women workers against such dress codes.

It has been argued that high heels in the workplace should be subject to a health and safety assessment.

==== Australia ====
Qantas, which is the national airline of Australia, declared in 2023 that its female flight attendants were no longer required to wear high heels.

==== Canada ====
Guidelines on acceptable dress codes in the workplace are permitted by Canadian law in order to ensure that employees are able to complete their work safely and effectively. However the inclusion of the wearing of high heels in these guidelines has created controversy. Some workplace studies show that women in the hospitality industry who wear high heels have suffered injuries after tripping, falling, or slipping. In addition, requirements for an appearance that differs for male and female employees have the potential to be considered discriminatory.

In 2014, waitresses at three restaurant chains in Calgary, Alberta, Canada, claimed that they were required to wear high heels at work despite complaining of pain and injury. Management responded that there was no written policy on wearing high heels.

In April 2017, the Canadian province of British Columbia amended workplace legislation to prevent employers from requiring women to wear high heels at work. British Columbia premier Christy Clark stated that the government was "changing this regulation to stop this unsafe and discriminatory practice." Other Canadian provinces followed suit.

=== United States ===
During the mid-1990s, several US-based airlines required female flight attendants to wear shoes with heels. Minimum heel heights ranged from one-half inch to the two inches mandated by USAir. Flight attendants at times avoided censure by changing into more comfortable shoes during flights, since their supervisors were less likely to be present there.

Policies that force women to wear heels have been challenged in a number of locations. In 2001, cocktail waitresses in Las Vegas organized a "Kiss My Foot" campaign which was successful in getting casinos to relax their requirement to wear high heels.

=== United Kingdom ===
In 2009, the UK Society of Chiropodists and Podiatrists released a report outlining the dangers of wearing high heels for extended periods and approached unions and employers to collaborate on measures to ensure risk assessments would be completed on women's footwear, and to offer alternatives to high heels where these were deemed unhealthy.

Similar policies were tested again in the UK in 2016 when a temporary receptionist, Nicola Thorp, stated that she was sent home unpaid after she refused to follow the dress code at the office of accountants PricewaterhouseCoopers which, according to her, required wearing shoes with a 2-4 inch heel. Outsourcing firm Portico stated that Thorp "had signed the appearance guidelines" but after Thorp launched an online petition—"Make it illegal for a company to require women to wear high heels at work"—the firm changed their policy. The new guideline states that all female employees "can wear plain flat shoes or plain court shoes as they prefer." The petition gained widespread support from public figures such as Scotland's First Minister Nicola Sturgeon and MPs Caroline Dinenage, Margot James and Tulip Siddiq. Two parliamentary committees in January 2017 decided that Portico had broken the law; the company had already changed its terms of employment. The petition gained over 130,000 signatures, sufficient for a debate in the British parliament. This took place on 6 March 2017, when MPs decided the UK government should change the law to prevent the demand being made by employers. However, this was rejected by the government in April 2017 as they stated that existing legislation was "adequate". The government clarified in a document published in May 2018 that high heel policies likely constituted direct discrimination, even if the men's shoes were required to "look smart", and potentially also indirect discrimination against those with mobility or vision problems.

=== Israel ===
In 2015, the Israeli airline El Al introduced a requirement that female flight attendants wear high heels until passengers had been seated. The airline's workers' union stated that the requirement would endanger the health and safety of the flight attendants and instructed its members to ignore the rule. Later that year the requirement was removed.

=== The Philippines ===
In 2017, the Philippines forbade companies from mandating that female employees wear high heels at work.

=== Japan ===
In 2019, a petition against mandatory high heels was started in Japan with the hashtag #KuToo, blending the #MeToo movement with the Japanese words for shoes (kutsu) and pain (kutsuu). The Japanese Minister of Labor has stated that it is acceptable for companies and others to require women to wear high heels as long as it is necessary and appropriate for the job, with reference to socially accepted norms.

== See also ==
- Cosmetics policy
- Foot Emancipation Society
- Gender-based dress codes
- Hijabophobia
- KuToo movement
- Price Waterhouse v. Hopkins
- Right to sit
- Trousers as women's clothing
