= Cosmetics policy =

Regulation or law about the wearing of cosmetics

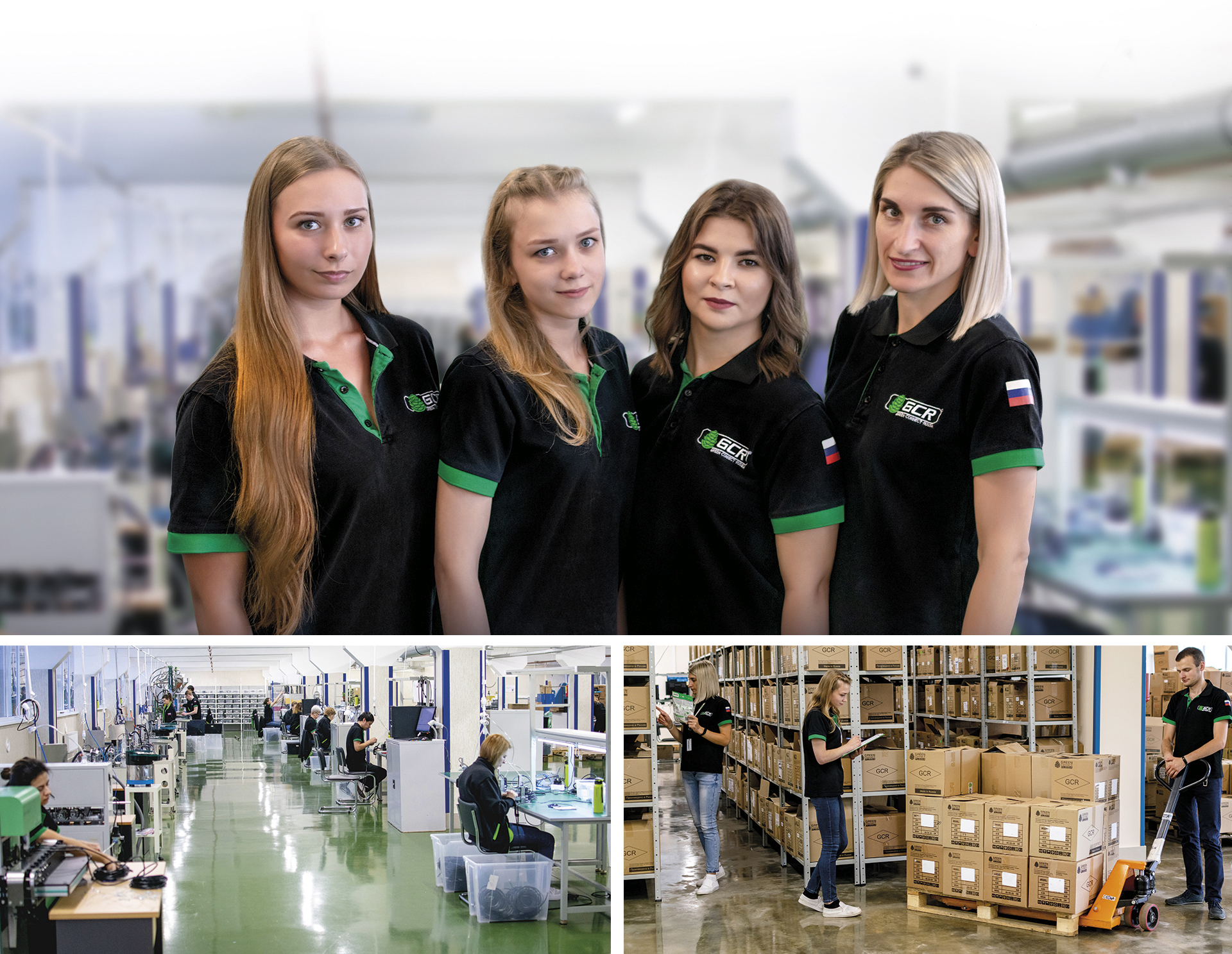
Female warehouse workers in Russia wearing makeup, December 2021.

A cosmetics policy is a policy concerning the wearing of cosmetics, which may be required or forbidden in different places and circumstances. A cosmetics policy that applies to only one sex, such as a policy requiring women to wear lipstick or a policy forbidding men to wear nail polish, is considered a form of sex discrimination by some critics. Sex-specific cosmetics policies may place burdens on women workers and may also present difficulties for transgender and non-binary people. Sex-specific cosmetics policies are legal in many jurisdictions.

== About ==
While many companies have mandatory cosmetics policies for women workers, the expectation that women wear cosmetics at work is often "unspoken". A gendered "grooming gap" in the workplace may have negative consequences for women workers, who may have to spend more money and time on cosmetics than men. Women workers may be disciplined, fired, or paid less if they do not wear cosmetics in the workplace. Companies with formal policies requiring that women wear makeup or that men cannot wear makeup have historically been permitted to have these gendered policies by federal courts in the United States.

== By jurisdiction ==
=== Japan ===
Mandatory cosmetics policies for women workers are commonplace in Japan. Women workers in the beauty industry have been prohibited from wearing eyeglasses by some companies because the eyeglasses may prevent customers from clearly seeing the makeup worn by a worker. Japanese women have protested eyeglass bans and requirements for makeup and high heels on social media, but the policies remain legal in Japan.

=== United Kingdom ===
In 2019, Virgin Atlantic airlines announced that they would no longer have a policy requiring women workers to wear makeup.

In 2022, British Airways changed their uniform policy to be gender neutral. Makeup is now optional for women workers and male workers are now allowed to wear makeup and nail polish.

=== United States ===
==== 20th century ====
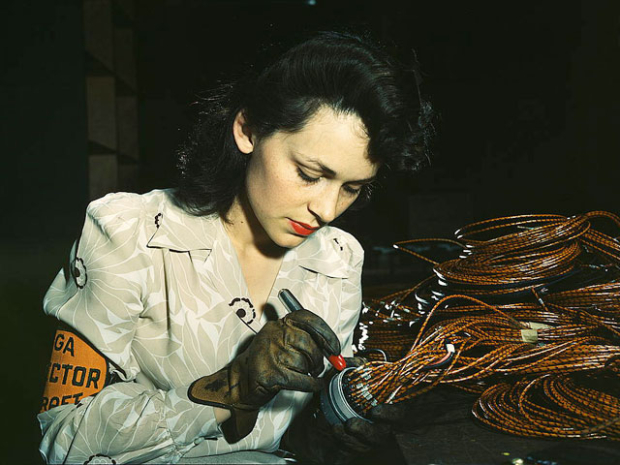
Female aircraft worker of the Vega Aircraft Corporation at Burbank, California, checking the electro-installation, July 1942. The worker is wearing red lipstick.

In 1941, and for the duration of World War II, the wearing of red lipstick became mandatory for women who joined the United States Army.

==== 21st century ====
In 2005, a worker alleged that she was dismissed from Harrah's Entertainment after she objected to the company's policy that women workers wear makeup. Her case, Jespersen v. Harrah's Operating Co., was considered by the United States Court of Appeals for the Ninth Circuit. The court decided that she was "justly fired" for refusing to wear makeup.

In 2014, a transgender teenager was instructed to remove her makeup before she could have her photograph taken for her drivers' license. A lawsuit against the South Carolina Department of Motor Vehicles resulted in a settlement allowing her to wear makeup in her photograph.

In 2017, a lawsuit in New Jersey alleged that a Cooper University Hospital worker was fired for wearing makeup to work. The worker claimed that a supervisor told him that "men should not wear make-up" in the workplace. The worker, a gay man, alleged discrimination on the basis of sexual orientation and gender non-conformity.

In 2018, a male student at Shadow Creek High School in Pearland, Texas, was disciplined after wearing makeup to school. Following controversy, the school district reevaluated its dress code which stipulated that "Boys may not wear make-up".

The Soldier's Blue Book, issued by the United States Army Training and Doctrine Command, states that men in the army are prohibited from wearing cosmetics unless medically necessary, but that women are permitted to wear cosmetics with any uniform as long as the cosmetics are applied "modestly and conservatively". Women in the army who wear cosmetics must apply cosmetics that "complement both the Soldier’s complexion and the uniform" and leadership are expected to "exercise good judgement" in enforcing the cosmetics policy. Women may not wear lipstick that "distinctly" differs from the shade of their lips and any cosmetics styles that are "Eccentric, exaggerated, or faddish" in their appearance are prohibited. Permanent makeup, including eyeliner and eyebrow makeup, may be permitted as long as it otherwise complies with the cosmetics guidelines.

== Criticism ==
Sheila Jeffreys, a political science professor at the University of Melbourne, has criticized policies mandating makeup, claiming that the wearing of makeup by women is often "not simply a matter of choice in the workplace, but the result of a system of power relations." She has compared compulsory makeup policies to compulsory burqa policies that exist in some Muslim-majority countries.

== See also ==
- Gender-based dress codes
- High heel policy
- Trousers as women's clothing
