= Grand Prix Charles-Leopold Mayer =

The Grand Prix Charles-Léopold Mayer (Charles-Léopold Mayer Prize) is awarded annually by the Académie des Sciences (French Academy of Sciences) de l'Institut de France (the French Institute) to researchers who have performed outstanding work in the biological sciences; especially in the areas of cell or molecular biology. Citizens or residents of any nation are eligible for the prize, but it is never awarded to individuals of the same nation two years in a row, nor is the prize ever presented to scholars who are more than 65 years of age. Between the first presentation of the award in 1961 and the year 2009, there have been more than 60 laureates, eleven of whom subsequently received the Nobel Prize in medicine, physiology, or chemistry.

The prize is named after French biochemist Charles Léopold Mayer.

== List of Recipients of the Grand Prix Charles-Léopold Mayer ==
Source: Académie des sciences

- 2019 - Silvia Arber
- 2018 - Eric Gilson
- 2016 - Claude Desplan
- 2015 - François Schweisguth
- 2014 - C. David Allis
- 2013 - Vincent Colot
- 2012 - Lyndon Emsley
- 2011 - Jean-Marc Reichhart
- 2010 - Robert Tjian
- 2009 - Marie-France Carlier
- 2008 - Adrian P. Bird
- 2007 - Eric Westhof
- 2006 - Bruce A. Beutler
- 2005 - Jean Dénarié
- 2004 - Denis Duboule
- 2003 - Paolo Sassone-Corsi
- 2002 - Roger D. Kornberg
- 2001 - Joël Bockaert
- 2000 - H. Robert Horvitz
- 1999 - Christine Petit
- 1998 - Elizabeth Blackburn
- 1997 - Andre Sentenac
- 1996 - Stanley B. Prusiner
- 1995 - Moshe Yaniv
- 1994 - Ralph L. Brinster and Richard Palmiter
- 1993 - Andrée Tixier-Vidal
- 1992 - Raymond Devoret and Miroslav Radman
- 1991 - Jean-Charles Schwartz
- 1990 - Jozef Schell and Marc Van Montagu
- 1989 - Marc Chabre
- 1988 - David Sabatini
- 1987 - Paul Cohen
- 1986 - Antonio García-Bellido and Walter Jakob Gehring
- 1985 - Jean Montreuil
- 1984 - John Bertrand Gurdon
- 1983 - Michel Lazdunski and Vittorio Luzzati
- 1982 - Barbara McClintock and Armine Braun
- 1981 - François Chapeville and Léon Hirth
- 1980 - Philippe L'Héritier
- 1979 - David Mervyn Blow and David Chilton Phillips
- 1978 - Roger Monier and Piotr Slonimski
- 1977 - Walter Gilbert, Mark Ptashne, and Evelyn M. Witkin
- 1976 - Jean-Pierre Ebel and Élie Wollman
- 1975 - Sydney Brenner
- 1974 - Georges Cohen
- 1973 - Jacques Oudin
- 1972 - Robert W. Briggs and Thomas J. King
- 1971 - Boris Ephrussi
- 1970 - Raymond Latarjet
- 1969 - Jean Brachet
- 1968 - François Gros
- 1967 - Marshall Nirenberg
- 1966 - Marianne Grunberg-Manago
- 1965 - Honor Bridget Fell
- 1964 - André Lwoff
- 1963 - Erwin Chargaff
- 1962 - François Jacob and Jacques Monod
- 1961 - Francis Crick

== See also ==
- List of biology awards
