= Odile Croissant =

French biologist and physicist (1923–2020)

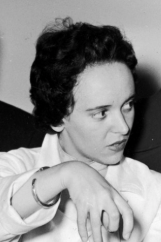
- Odile Croissant in 1954
- Born: Odile Marcelle Marie Croissant; 6 October 1923; Honfleur, France
- Died: August 3, 2020 (aged 96); Paris, France
- Education: University of Strasbourg (PhD)
- Scientific career
- Fields: Biophysics
- Workplaces: Pasteur Institute
- Thesis: Étude en microscopie électronique et en microdiffraction électronique de la morphologie et de la structure des verres silicatés (1962)

Odile Croissant (6 October 1923 – 3 August 2020) was a French biologist, physicist and specialist in electron microscopy. She trained in a number of countries, building her career from laboratory assistant to researcher at the Pasteur Institute. Croissant was one of the first scientists to develop techniques for the in situ detection of viral nucleic acids, and played a key part in the creation of the first physical map of the only human papillomavirus known at the time (HPV1).

In 2026, she was announced as one of 72 historical women in STEM whose names have been proposed to be added to the 72 men already celebrated on the Eiffel Tower.

== Early life and education ==
Odile Marcelle Marie Croissant was born in Honfleur in Normandy on 6 October 1923. In November 1942, she joined the Pasteur Institute in Paris, working as a secretary and laboratory assistant in the typhus laboratory headed by biologist Paul Giroud.

In 1945, she moved to the Virus Department of the Pasteur Institute, headed by Pierre Lépine. It was during this role that she was introduced to electron microscopy by the physicists who had designed the first French electron microscope. Croissant undertook a number of internships in her early career which enabled her to develop skills and experience. In 1947 she interned at the Institute of Electron Microscopy in Delft in the Netherlands, then at the Cavendish Laboratory at the University of Cambridge, and in 1950 at the University of Montreal in Canada.

== Career ==
In 1947, she served as assistant secretary of the French National Centre for Scientific Research's Electronic Optics Commission. In 1949, Croissant became a physicist-preparator in the electron microscopy laboratory of virus department at the Pasteur Institute. She trained numerous students in electron microscopy techniques, particularly in RCA microscopy and ultra-thin sectioning techniques.

In 1947, she was appointed as maîtresse de recherches at the French National Centre for Scientific Research. From 1946, Croisant worked in Pierre Lépine's laboratory, carrying out studies on viruses (including rabies, vaccinia, poliomyelitis, bacteriophages, insect viruses) and on the cellular lesions induced by these viruses.

In December 1954, during the smallpox epidemic in Vannes, Brittany, she was tasked with identifying the virus responsible, based on samples taken from patients.

In 1955, she spent three months in the United States as a visiting scientist at the laboratory of crystallographer Ralph Walter Graystone Wyckoff at the National Institutes of Health. He was renowned for his work in crystallography and electron microscopy, and had visited the virus department of the Pasteur Institute a number of times. From 1956, she was part of the theoretical and practical teaching team at the Pasteur Institute, which covered electron microscopy applications in the study of cells and viruses, the cell culture course in virology, the general microbiology course and the course on photonic optical microscopes and electron microscopy methods.

In 1957, Croissant returned to spend a further four months as a visiting scientist at the US National Institutes of Health at the invitation of Wyckoff, who had become a regular collaborator.

In 1958, she became interested in the various techniques for analysing the structure of matter using electrons and X-rays. She worked on the structure of glass, in collaboration with the Institute of Mineralogy of the Faculty of Sciences at the University of Strasbourg, working with Stanislas Goldsztaub and Henri Saucier.

Croissant studied the structure of glass and the chemical reactions caused by scratching, using microdiffraction and electron microscopy techniques. On 10 January 1962, Croissant defended her thesis in physics at the University of Strasbourg, entitled "Study of the morphology and structure of silicate glasses using electron microscopy and electron microdiffraction" (French: Étude en microscopie électronique et en microdiffraction électronique de la morphologie et de la structure des verres silicatés).

In 1963, Croissant made a third visit to the United States, where she completed a postdoctoral fellowship as an assistant professor in Wyckoff's laboratory, in the Institute of Physics at the University of Arizona. In 1964, upon her return to France, Croissant returned to France and was appointed research fellow at the French National Centre for Scientific Research (CNRS) and, in this capacity, served as head of the electron microscopy laboratory in the virus department at the Pasteur Institute. There, she began collaborating on human papillomaviruses (HPV) with virologist Gérard Orth's group, based at the Institut Gustave Roussy in Villejuif.

=== Human papillomaviruses ===
In 1970, in collaboration with the teams of mollecular biologist Moshé Yaniv, François Cuzin, Peter Sheldrick and Gérard Orth, Croissant specialised in the most modern applications of electron microscopy to the study of viral nucleic acids and their interactions with proteins. Croissant was one of the first to develop techniques for the in situ detection of viral nucleic acid. She played a significant role in the establishment of the first physical map of the only human papillomavirus known at the time (HPV1).

In 1971, Croissant co-authored an article with Gérard Orth and Philippe André Jeanteur, on the application of the in situ molecular hybridisation technique to the electron microscopic detection of vegetative replication of viral DNA in papillomas caused by the Shope virus in rabbits (Proc. Nat. Acad. Sci. United States, 68, 1876-1880).

In 1978, she joined the Papillomavirus Unit created at the Pasteur Institute under the initiative of biologist François Gros, which was directed by Gérard Orth. She was part of the team's pioneering work, which highlighted the multiplicity of human papillomaviruses (HPV), the specificity of their pathogenicity and their oncogenic potential. The discoveries were made in collaboration with Michel Favre and Stefania Jablonska, a dermatologist at the Department of Dermatology at the Medical University of Warsaw. This work demonstrated the oncogenic potential of one of the human papillomaviruses (HPV5), identified in patients with epidermodysplasia verruciformis.

In 1980, Croissant was closely involved in the work of the Papillomavirus Unit, which helped to demonstrate the role of certain papillomaviruses in the etiology of genital cancers, particularly cervical cancer. Close ties were between the Pasteur Unit and la Société Française de Colposcopie et de Pathologie Cervico-Vaginale (La SFCPCV), which played an essential role in disseminating knowledge that would advance gynecologic oncology. All members of the Unit were called upon to give lectures or courses in Paris and across France. Croissant's laboratory welcomed many gynaecologists, cytologists and histologists. Some joined the Unit after being trained by Croissant, including Renzo Barrasso (former secretary general of La SFCPCV) and Christine Bergeron (later president of La SFCPCV) and Xavier Sastre-Garau (long-time director of the Department of Pathological Anatomy at the Curie Institute.

In September 1985, Croissant was given charge of the first collaborative programme between the Pasteur Institute and the Californian company Beckman Coulter, looking at the application of cold probes in diagnostics, with the aim of developing and evaluating probes capable of detecting types of HPV of interest to subjects at risk of cervical cancer. Agnès Ullmann had been the instigator of this programme.

In 1989, after her official retirement, Croissant obtained permission to continue her work in Gérard Orth's unit and published a final article in 2001. In 2004, Croissant contributed to the creation of her archive collection, which includes documents relating to the early days of electron microscopy at the Pasteur Institute and in France.

Odile Croissant died in 13th Arrondissement of Paris on 3 August 2020, age 96.

== Honours ==
In 1979, the Fondation pour la recherche médicale awarded Odile Croissant the Delahautemaison Prize.

In 2004, Croissant contributed to the creation of her archive collection, which includes documents relating to the early days of electron microscopy at the Pasteur Institute and in France.

In 2026, was announced as one of 72 historical women in STEM whose names have been proposed to be added to the 72 men already celebrated on the Eiffel Tower. The plan was announced by the mayor of Paris, Anne Hidalgo following the recommendations of a committee led by Isabelle Vauglin of Femmes et Sciences and Jean-François Martins, representing the operating company which runs the Eiffel Tower.

== Selected publications ==
- Chromatin-Like Structures in Polyoma Virus and Simian Virus 40 Lytic Cycle
- Characterization of a New Type of Human Papillomavirus That Causes Skin Warts
- Identification of Papillomaviruses in Butchers' Warts
- Analysis of human cancers, normal tissues, and verruce plantares for DNA sequences of human papillomavirus types 1 and 2
- Specificity of cytopathic effect of cutaneous human papillomaviruses
- High Prevalence of Papillomavirus-Associated Penile Intraepithelial Neoplasia in Sexual Partners of Women with Cervical Intraepithelial Neoplasia
- Rearrangement of a common cellular DNA domain on chromosome 4 in human primary liver tumors
- Human papillomaviruses associated with cervical intraepithelial neoplasia. Great diversity and distinct distribution in low- and high-grade lesions

SciSpace records 49 publications by Croissant
