= Eric Westhof =

French biochemist (born 1948)

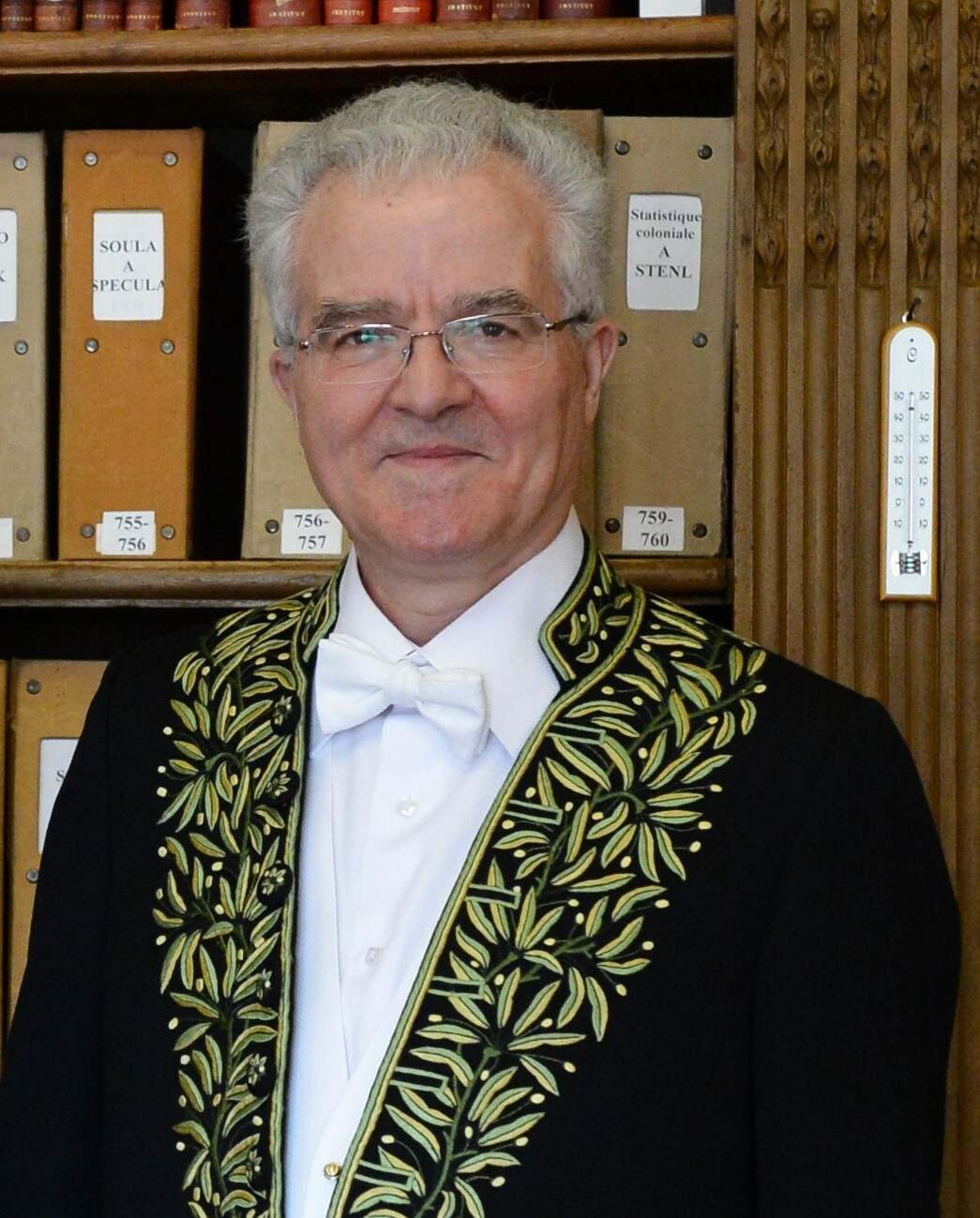
- Born: Eric Westhof
- Education: Université de Liège (Licence, MSc, PhD)
- Awards: RNA Society Lifetime Achievement Award (2016); Médaille de la Société Française de Biochimie et Biologie Moléculaire (SFBBM) (2014)
- Scientific career
- Fields: RNA
- Workplaces: Université de Strasbourg
- Website: www-ibmc.u-strasbg.fr/upr9002/westhof/index.html

Éric Westhof is a French biochemist born in Uccle (Belgium) on July 25, 1948. He is a member of the Académie des Sciences, head of Education and Training (DEF) and a member of the Board of Directors of the "La Main à la pâte" Foundation. He is professor emeritus of structural biochemistry at the University of Strasbourg at the Institute of Molecular and Cellular Biology.

== Biography ==
=== Early life and education ===
After obtaining a bachelor's degree in physical sciences from the University of Liège, he carried out research work at the Regensburg Universität (Germany) on a EURATOM grant with a view to obtaining a doctorate from the University of Liège in 1974.

=== Postdoctoral training ===
In 1977, first as a Fulbright-Hays Research Fellow and later as a Research Associate, Westhof joined the Department of Biochemistry at the University of Wisconsin–Madison to train with Muttaiya Sundaralingam in crystallography of nucleic acids, a position he held until 1981. He then returned to Europe on an EMBO postdoctoral fellowship to work with Jean-Pierre Ebel and Dino Moras at the Institut de Biologie Moléculaire et Cellulaire (IBMC) of the Centre national de la recherche scientifique (CNRS) in Strasbourg, where he carried out crystallographic refinement of yeast aspartic acid transfer RNA crystals.

=== Academic career ===
In 1984, Westhof obtained a position as a CNRS research fellow (chargé de recherches, CR1) at the IBMC and obtained a professorship in structural biochemistry at the Louis Pasteur University (later University of Strasbourg) in 1988. He oversaw 14 PhD theses between 1992 and 2006. From 2005 to 2016, he was director of the CNRS Research Unit "Architecture and Reactivity of RNA" at the IBMC, a unit comprising around 110 researchers, technicians, postdoctoral fellows and students. From 2006 to 2016, he also served as director of the broader IBMC, which included three CNRS units and around 230 members in total.

From 2003 to 2007, he was chairman of the Research Commission of the Faculty of Life Sciences of Louis Pasteur University, where he was an elected member of the Scientific Council from 2002 to 2006. He was then elected vice-president for research and doctoral training (2007–2008). Together with Alain Beretz, he was involved in the merger of the three Strasbourg universities and served as vice-president of research and doctoral training at the University of Strasbourg between 2009 and 2012. He subsequently served as Delegate for Education and Formation at the French Académie des sciences between 2016 and 2022.

=== Editorial activities ===
Eric Westhof is an executive editor of Nucleic Acids Research (OUP), an editor of the RNA journal (CSHP). He has been an associate editor of the Journal of Molecular Recognition (Wiley), and an editor of Biochemical and Biophysical Research Communications (Elsevier). He has co-edited four books focused on nucleic acids. He was a founding editor of the journal RNA when Thomas Cech invited him to join the editorial board in 1995.

== Research area ==
His research area concerns the structural biology of nucleic acids (stereochemistry, topology, modelling and bioinformatics) and especially ribonucleic acid molecules (RNA). He has developed computer tools dedicated to crystallographic refinement and computer manipulation of nucleic acids. These have led to excellent three-dimensional RNA structures. For more than a decade, these tools have been used by nucleic acid crystallographers in many countries. At a time when only the structure of the transfer RNA was known, he and François Michel proposed a three-dimensional model of the structure of the core of group I autocatalytic introns. Ten years later, crystallography confirms the architecture of the model, thus offering a vast field of new applications in structural biology. Folding of other ribozymes (hepatitis delta virus, ribonuclease P, hairpin ribozyme) has also been proposed. Several years after these publications, independent crystal structures have shown the accuracy of the architecture of the folds and interactions responsible for self-assembly. His expertise in RNA structure modeling has led him to collaborate with several groups. Thus, with F. Eckstein and T. Tuschl, the first model of the hammer-headed ribozyme was produced on the basis of fluorescence data. With Dr. Kochoyan, the first models of RNA aptamers modelled from nuclear magnetic resonance data were presented. With W. Filipowicz and F. Kolb, a DICER double-stranded RNA binding and cleavage model explaining the maturation of microRNAs has been published.

Analysis of crystallographic structures and comparisons with theoretical models then made it possible to establish predictive rules for RNA folding. With Neocles Leontis, Eric Westhof proposed an ontology of pairs between nucleic acid bases that allows automatic annotation of crystal structures and bioinformatic research of structured regions in RNA sequences; This structural bioinformatics work by the RNA has made it possible to identify a set of constraints in sequence allowing architectural models of RNA. This set of rules and constraints, which can be read from sequence alignments and manipulated by computer, allows them to deduce RNA architectures, which is essential for our understanding of the function and structural evolution of RNAs.

Eric Westhof has extended his physico-chemical, structural and dynamic studies of RNAs to functional and evolutionary aspects, as well as to the prediction of strong and specific molecular interactions with molecules of therapeutic interest. The crystallographic structures of many complexes between aminoglycoside antibiotics and the site A of the 30S particle of eubacterial ribosomes clearly show the origin of the binding specificity and resistance induced by these aminoglycosides. Recently, with Marat and Gula Yusupov and their collaborators, a detailed understanding of decoding errors due to tautomeric forms of the pairs between G and U has been demonstrated. In parallel with Henri Grosjean, a new representation of the genetic code anchored in ribosome structures related to messenger RNA and transfer RNA and integrating the very numerous observations on the effects of changes in transfer RNAs is of great interest.

Other articles based on the analysis of crystallographic and bioinformatic structures have generated a large number of citations. In 1984, Eric Westhof and Marc van Regenmortel's team demonstrated a correlation that proved to be central in immunochemistry: antigen epitopes generally have greater mobility than the less immunogenic regions of proteins. With Pascal Auffinger, the importance and specificity of halogen atom-mediated bonds in biological macromolecules and nucleic acids was established. Finally, with the Genolevures consortium, they annotated the non-coding RNAs of yeasts in addition to the coding genes and compared them between yeasts.

== RNA-Puzzles ==
RNA-Puzzles was launched in 2011 as a collaborative, community-wide effort dedicated to advancing and improving RNA 3D structure prediction, modelled after the Critical Assessment of Protein Structure Prediction (CASP) competition for proteins. The initiative constituted the first collective, blind experiment in RNA three-dimensional structure prediction, with the goals of assessing the leading edge of RNA structure prediction techniques, comparing existing methods and tools, and evaluating their relative strengths, weaknesses and limitations in terms of sequence length and structural complexity. Westhof organised the RNA-Puzzles challenge over a period of more than fifteen years.

The competition has run through multiple rounds: the first three prediction puzzles were published in 2012, with subsequent rounds (Round II, Round III and beyond) covering riboswitches, ribozymes and other RNA targets of increasing size and complexity. In CASP15, the first CASP exercise to include RNA structure modelling, the RNA-Puzzles team (Z. Miao and E. Westhof) co-assessed RNA structure predictions alongside assessors nominated by the CASP organizers. The two independent analyses produced a striking consensus in rankings and choice of top predictors, despite the use of distinct metrics and ranking schemes. Westhof also participated in the assessment of RNA-only targets in CASP16 (2024).

== Nucleic acid base pairs ==
The natural bases of nucleic acids form a great variety of base pairs with at least two hydrogen bonds between them. These hydrogen bonds can occur between atoms belonging to any of the three edges of the nucleic acid edges. The possible combinations lead to a classification in twelve main families, with the Watson-Crick family being one of them. In a given family, some of the base pairs are isosteric between them, meaning that the positions and the distances between the C1’ carbon atoms are very similar. The isostericity of Watson-Crick pairs between the complementary bases forms the basis of RNA helices and of the resulting RNA secondary structure (covariation). In addition, several defined suites of non-Watson-Crick base pairs assemble into RNA modules that form recurrent, rather regular, building blocks of the tertiary architecture of folded RNAs. RNA modules are intrinsic to RNA architecture are therefore disconnected from a biological function specifically attached to a RNA sequence. RNA modules occur in all kingdoms of life and in structured RNAs with diverse functions. Because of chemical and geometrical constraints, isostericity between non-Watson-Crick pairs is restricted and this leads to higher sequence conservation with coevolution (neutral networks) in RNA modules with, consequently, greater difficulties in extracting 3D information from sequence analysis.

== Tautomerism and recognition of nucleic acid base pairs ==
Nucleic acid helices are recognized in several biological processes like during nucleic acid replication or ribosomal translational decoding. In polymerases and the ribosomal decoding site, the recognition occurs on the minor groove sides of the helical fragments. With or without the use of alternative conformations, protonated or tautomeric forms of the bases, some base pairs with Watson-Crick-like geometries can form and be stabilized. Several of these pairs with Watson-Crick-like geometries extend the concept of isostericity beyond the number of isosteric pairs formed between complementary bases. These observations set therefore limits and constraints to geometric selection in molecular recognition of complementary Watson-Crick pairs for fidelity in replication and translation processes.

== Ribosomal decoding fidelity and efficiency ==
The basic principles of mRNA decoding are conserved among all extant life forms. We present an integrative view all the complex interaction networks between mRNA, tRNA, and rRNA : the intrinsic stability of codon-anticodon trimers, the spatial conformation of the anticodon stem-loop of tRNA, the presence of modified nucleotides, the occurrence of non-Watson-Crick pairs in the codon-anticodon helix and the interactions with bases of rRNA at the decoding site. We derive an information-rich, alternative representation of the genetic code table. The new organization of the 64 codons is circular with an asymmetric distribution of codons that leads to a clear segregation between GC-rich 4-codon boxes and AU-rich 2:2-codon and 3:1-codon boxes. The advantage of integrating data in this circular decoding system is that all tRNA sequence variations can be visualized, within an internal structural and energy framework, for each organism and anticodon. Within this new representation, the multiplicity and complexity of nucleotide modifications, especially at positions 34 and 37 of the anticodon loop, segregate meaningfully and correlate well with the necessity to stabilize AU-rich codon-anticodon pairs and to avoid miscoding in split codon boxes. This structure-based network of interactions results in an energetically uniform decoding of all tRNAs that can adapt to the cellular constraints. The evolution and expansion of the genetic code is viewed as originally based on GC content with the progressive introduction of A/U together with tRNA modifications and the modification enzymes. This allows for a great diversity of codon usage depending on GC content of the genome and on the number and types of tRNAs. The representation should help the engineering of the genetic code to non-natural amino acids.

In summary, in order to maximize the diversity in codon usage without increasing the numberf different tRNAs (for decoding the 61 sense codons), cells developed sophisticated arrays of tRNA modifications that are anchored in cellular metabolic enzymatic pathways. The genetic code is not translated universally and several differences exist between organisms and in the three kingdoms of life. In each organism, there is a very strong connectivity between the elements responsible for the reliability and efficiency of the decoding process of the genetic code. The multiplicity of these highly interconnected elements and the integration of the various biological information flows ultimately allow for the maintenance of subtle cellular homeostasis and place the processes of translation at the center of cellular activities.

== Bibliography ==
- E. Westhof and N. Hardy, Water and Biological Macromolecules in Folding and Self-assembly of Biological Macromolecules, McMillan, London, World Scientific, Singapore, 1993 and 2014
- E. Westhof, R.K. Hartmann, A. Bindereif, A. Schön, Handbook of RNA Biochemistry, Weinheim, Wiley-VCH, 2005, 2014
- E. Westhof and N. Leontis, RNA 3D Structure Analysis and Prediction, Berlin Heidelberg, Springer, 2012.

== Membership in learned societies ==
- French Society of Biochemistry and Molecular Biology (President 2004–2008)
- RNA Society (President 2005)
- American Association for the Advancement of Science (Fellow)
- Institute of Physics, London, U.K. (Fellow)
- Chairman of the steering committee of the Maison pour la science en Alsace

== Membership of other academies ==
- Institut Universitaire de France (1995–2005).
- Member of EMBO (European Molecular Biology Organization, 1998).
- Member of the Deutsche Akademie der Naturforscher Leopoldina (2000).
- Member of the Academia Europaea (2001).
- Member of the Académie des Sciences (2011).

== Awards and honours ==
- Jacques Monod Prize, Institut Pasteur (1992).
- Charles Leopold-Mayer Prize from the Académie des sciences (2007).
- Outstanding Service Award, RNA Society (2008).
- Feodor Lynen Medal, Gesellschaft für Biochemie und Molekulare Biologie (2011)
- Medal of the French Society of Biochemistry and Molecular Biology (2014).
- Chevalier of the Ordre national du Mérite (2015).
- Lifetime Achievement Award, RNA Society (2016).
- Wang Ying Lai Prize, Institute of Biochemistry, Academia sinica, Shanghai (2017).
- Rolf-SAMMET-Gastprofessor, Aventis Foundation, Johann Wolfgang Goethe Universität, Frankfurt-am-Main (2018).
