= Holger Stark =

German pharmacist (born 1962)

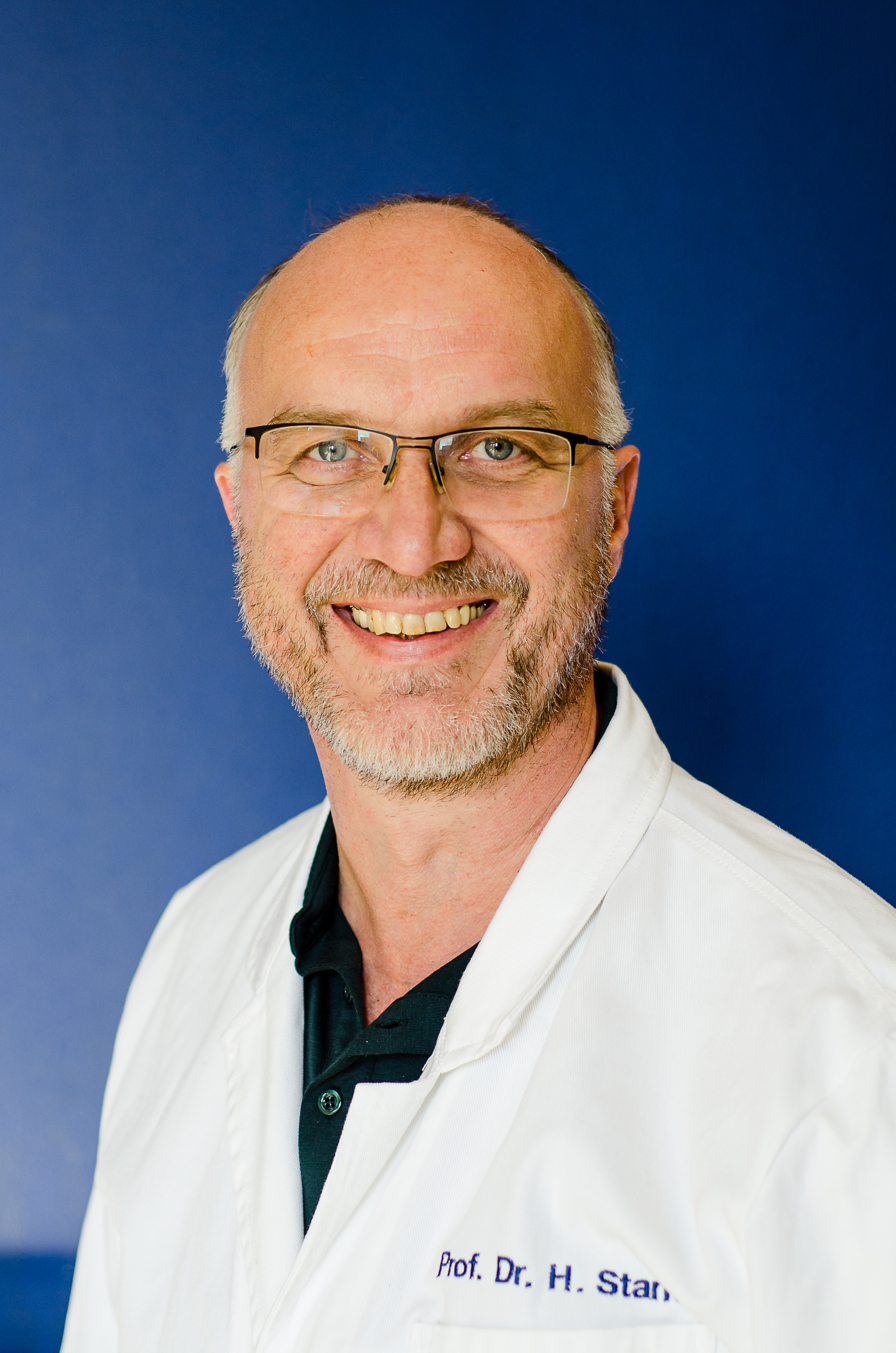
Holger Stark (2018)

Holger Stark (born on September 15, 1962) is a German pharmacist and a Professor at Heinrich Heine University in Düsseldorf. Stark is a co-inventor of the active ingredient Pitolisant, the only histamine H_{3} receptor antagonist approved to date.

== Professional background ==
Stark pursued pharmacy studies at the Free University of Berlin from 1982 to 1986, obtaining his pharmacist license in 1987. He conducted his PhD research at the Institute of Pharmacy at the Free University of Berlin from 1987 to 1991, under the guidance of Professor Walter Schunack, in collaboration with Professor Jean-Charles Schwartz (Bioprojet, Paris/France) and Professor Charon Robin Ganelli (London/England). He was awarded his PhD (Dr. rer. nat.) with summa cum laude distinction in December 1991. Following his doctoral research, he focused on developing new, selective ligands for dopamine D_{2}-like receptors, collaborating with Dr. Pierre Sokoloff from the Unité de Neurobiology et Pharmacologie - INSERM (Paris/France). He obtained his habilitation in pharmaceutical chemistry in 1999, with a monograph titled “Dopamine D_{3} receptor ligands as pharmacological tools and potential medicinal products,” maintaining the venia legendi. Stark commenced his academic career as a C3 professor for pharmaceutical/medicinal chemistry at Johann Wolfgang Goethe University in Frankfurt am Main, ascending to the W3 professorship in 2007. In 2013, he assumed a W3 professorship in pharmaceutical and medicinal chemistry at Heinrich Heine University Düsseldorf. In recognition of his remarkable research contributions and dedication to fostering collaborations, Stark was conferred an honorary doctorate from the University of Niš in Serbia in 2016. He served as Editor-in-Chief of the Archiv der Pharmazie from 2004 to 2019. Stark has authored over 240 original papers, review articles, and book chapters and has been involved in ten international patent families, with 60 national applications.

== Scientific research ==
Stark's academic pursuits have been centered on drug discovery. His research specializes in developing novel synthetic receptor ligands for G protein-coupled receptors, particularly histamine and dopamine receptors, with a focus on achieving high affinity and selectivity. Employing a blend of chemical synthesis, rational drug design, and pharmacological and cell-biological testing, Stark's approach aims to create pharmacological tools like fluorescent ligands, as well as potential new drug candidates for conditions such as Parkinson's disease, Alzheimer's disease, and schizophrenia, with the goal of restoring normal physiological functions. His research interests extend to various other pharmaceutical and medical domains, including NMDA receptor ligands, sphingolipids, enzyme inhibitors (such as monoamine oxidase and cholinesterase), cyclooxygenase, arachidonate-5-lipoxygenase, and ion channels.

== Memberships ==
Stark holds membership in several pharmaceutical and scientific societies and organizations, including the German Pharmaceutical Society (DPhG), where he served as chairman of the Hessen state group from 2004 to 2013. Since 2014, he has chaired the DPhG state group in Rheinland. Additionally, he is affiliated with the German Chemical Society (GdCh), the European Histamine Research Society (EHRS), and the Frankfurt Pharmacy School e.V., an organization he helped establish.

== Awards and honours ==
- 1992: Joachim Tiburtius Prize (recognition prize) from the State of Berlin for an outstanding dissertation
- 1997/2004: PHOENIX Pharmacy Science Prizes for pharmaceutical chemistry from PHOENIX Pharmahandel AG & Co., Heidelberg and Erlangen
- 2000: Call for pharmaceutical/medicinal chemistry (C3) at Johann Wolfgang Goethe University in Frankfurt am Main (accepted)
- 2005: Call for pharmaceutical chemistry (W3) at the Technical University Carolo-Wilhelmina in Braunschweig (declined)
- 2007: Professor of Pharmaceutical/Medicinal Chemistry (W3) at Johann Wolfgang Goethe University in Frankfurt am Main
- 2008: Appointment to the Chair of Pharmaceutical Chemistry at Leopold Franzens University, Innsbruck/Austria (declined)
- 2008: Hessian University Prize for Excellence in Teaching "Project of a working group or organizational unit" (4th place)
- 2013: Professor of Pharmaceutical and Medicinal Chemistry (W3) at Heinrich Heine University Düsseldorf (accepted)
- 2016: Honorary Doctorate from the University of Niš, Serbia
- 2018: Heinrich Heine University Prize for Excellence in Teaching for "Innovative teaching concept" for the first-semester excursion "Pharmanauts"
- 2025: North Rhine-Westphalia Innovation Award – "Innovation" Category for the development of a new therapeutic option for the treatment of glaucoma.
- 2025: PHOENIX Pharmaceutical Science Award in Pharmacology and Clinical Pharmacy, presented by PHOENIX Pharmahandel AG & Co., Heidelberg/Erlangen, in collaboration with Prof. Dr. Dr. Achim Schmidtko and Johann Wolfgang Goethe-Universität Frankfurt am Main
