= Lyndon Emsley =

British chemist

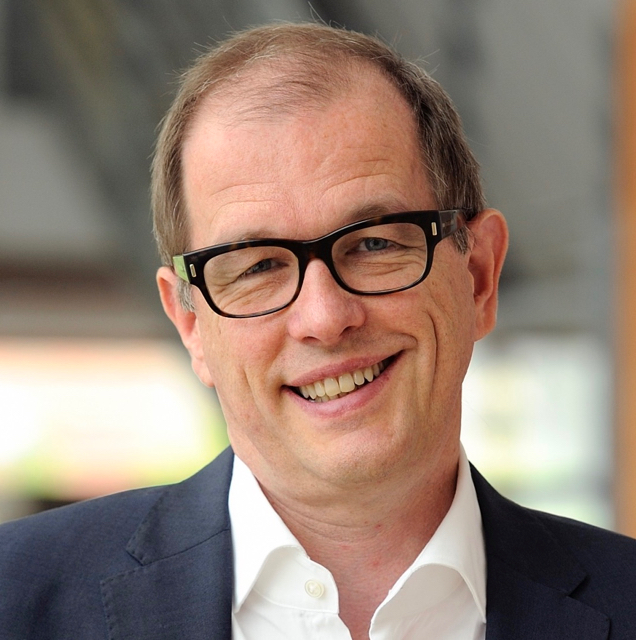
- Emsley in 2014
- Born: David Lyndon Emsley; 29 November 1964 (age 61); Durham, England
- Education: Imperial College of Science and Technology; Université de Lausanne (Ph.D.)
- Awards: Bourke Award (2015); Grand Prix Charles-Leopold Mayer (2012)
- Scientific career
- Fields: Solid-state chemistry, spectroscopy
- Workplaces: École Polytechnique Fédérale de Lausanne
- Doctoral advisor: Geoffrey Bodenhausen
- Website: lrm.epfl.ch/emsley

David Lyndon Emsley FRSC (born 29 November 1964) is a British chemist specialising in solid-state nuclear magnetic resonance and a professor at EPFL (École Polytechnique Fédérale de Lausanne). He was awarded the 2012 Grand Prix Charles-Leopold Mayer of the French Académie des Sciences and the 2015 Bourke Award of the Royal Society of Chemistry.

He was an editorial board member of the journal Magnetic Resonance in Chemistry from 2008 to 2010. He is a member of the Editorial Advisory Board of ChemPhysChem and Solid State Nuclear Magnetic Resonance. He is an associate editor of the Journal of the American Chemical Society.

== Birth and education ==
Emsley is the son of professor James Emsley, of the University of Southampton. The younger Emsley received his Master of Science in chemistry from the Imperial College of Science and Technology in 1986 and received his Ph.D. from the Université de Lausanne in 1991 under the direction of Geoffrey Bodenhausen working with NMR spectroscopy of solutions. Before beginning his Ph.D., he had worked more than one year in Great Britain at a firm specializing in intellectual property law.

== Career ==
Emsley began his postdoctoral research at the Miller Institute for Basic Research in Science (University of California, Berkeley), where he was introduced to solid-state NMR working with Alexander Pines. In 1993 he moved to the French National Laboratory for Atomic Energy Research in Grenoble, where he worked as a post-doc with Claude Roby and Michel Bardet.

In October 1994 he was appointed to a Professorship (Professeur associé) at the Ecole normale supérieure in Lyon, and became Full Professor in 1995. In Lyon he was the head of the Experimental Chemistry Laboratory from 1999 to 2002, and director of the Chemistry Department from 2006 to 2014. In 2002 he became a member of the Institut Universitaire de France.

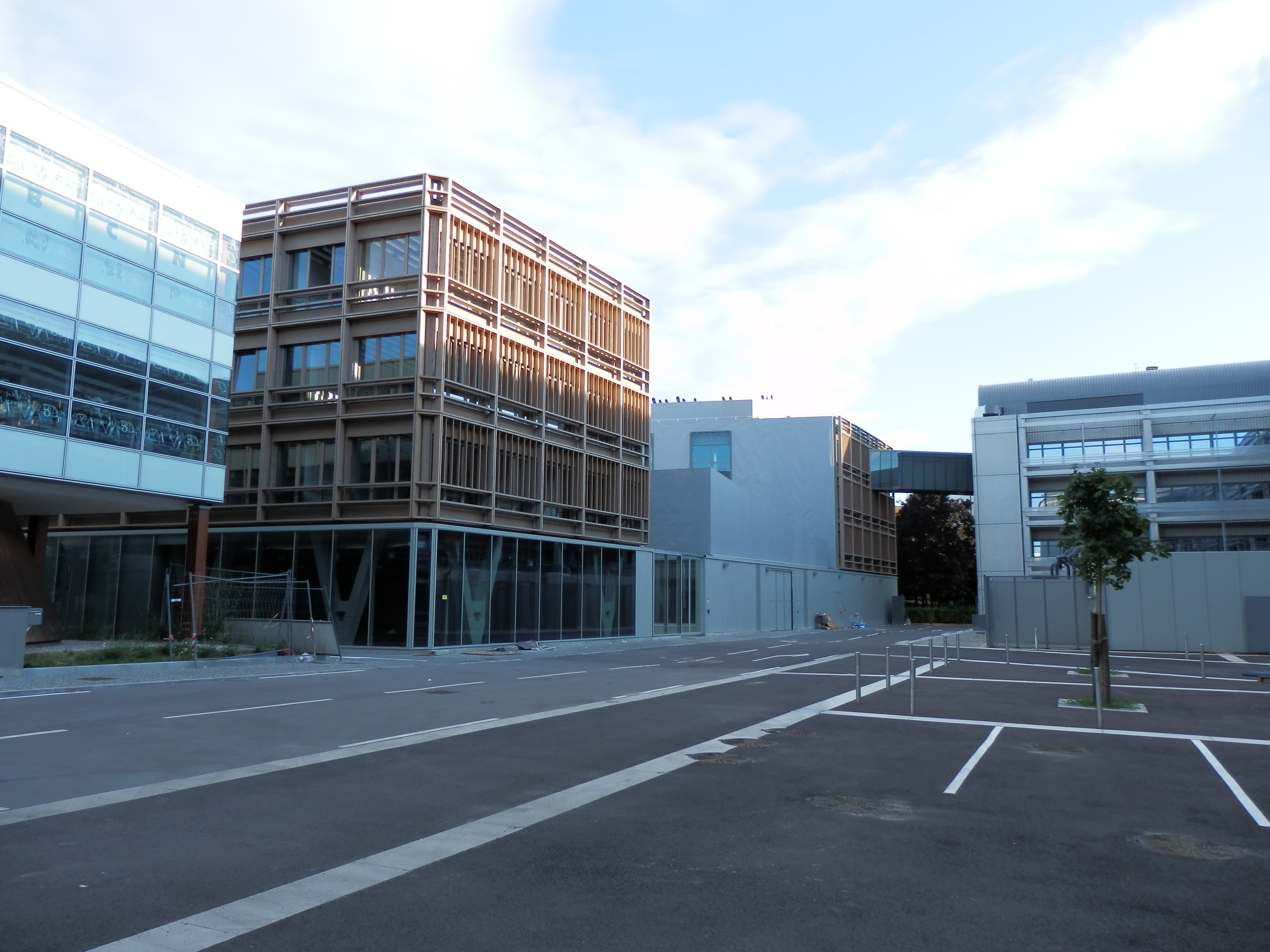
The newly completed ISA area in August 2012; the CRMN building is on the left

In 2003 Emsley was appointed as project leader for the creation in Villeurbanne of the Centre Européen de Résonance Magnétique Nucléaire à Très Hauts Champs (CRMN, European Laboratory for Very High Field NMR), which was the first step in launching the forthcoming Institute of Analytical Sciences (ISA). The building of the new laboratory was completed in 2008.

Since 2011, he has been an associate editor of the Journal of the American Chemical Society.

In 2012 he was promoted to Senior Member of the Institut Universitaire de France.

In June 2014 he moved to the EPFL as a professor of physical chemistry, where he is currently director of the Laboratoire de résonance magnétique of the ISIC (Institute of chemical sciences and engineering).

In 2015 he received the Bourke award "for the development of experimental methods that have transformed the field of solid-state NMR and enabled new applications across chemistry".

== Research ==
Emsley's main research field is solid-state NMR spectroscopy, specifically the development of new spectroscopic methods for the determination the atomic-level structure, the dynamics and the reactivity of a wide range of materials and molecular systems, that have been inaccessible with other analytical methods.

He published articles in NMR crystallography, structural biology, protein dynamics, dynamic nuclear polarization (DNP) enhanced surface NMR spectroscopy and MRI.

His work has involved several collaborations with the Bruker Corporation. In 2010, under his supervision as scientific director, the CRMN acquired and began using the world's most powerful currently operating NMR spectrometer, which breaks the billion-hertz barrier. CRMN was also one of the first laboratories in the world to install a high field (800 MHz proton resonant frequency) solid state DNP accessory and to test the new very fast 0.7 mm MAS rotors.

=== Solid-state NMR sequences ===
Emsley worked with colleague Anne Lesage to introduce new through-bond carbon-proton correlation techniques in CP-MAS NMR, namely the MAS-J-HSQC and MAS-J-HMQC experiments, both used to improve resolution of two-dimensional heteronuclear correlation spectra through bond homonuclear correlations with the refocused INADEQUATE experiment in solids. They showed also the feasibility of ssNMR spectral editing techniques making use of heteronuclear scalar couplings.

These implementations paved the way to the spectral characterization of solid samples at natural isotopic abundance, in a manner similar to liquid-state NMR.

It was therefore possible use scalar couplings to probe weak bonding interactions in solids and provide the first ever direct detection of a hydrogen bond in the solid-state, as well as the first experimental demonstration of the presence of agostic interactions in surface species, indicated by carbenic $J_{C-H}$.

His team also introduced a theoretical framework for the application of continuously phase modulated radio-frequency pulses for homonuclear decoupling in solid-state NMR, allowing new families of decoupling sequences. This allowed them to obtain high-resolution proton spectra in solids. a key step for three-dimensional structure determination of organic and inorganic materials at natural isotopic abundance.

=== NMR Crystallography ===
The improvements in the area of proton ssNMR, specifically homonuclear decoupling, set the field for the development of NMR Crystallography.

Contrary to X-ray, single crystals are not necessary with ssNMR and structural information can be obtained from high-resolution spectra of disordered solids.

In 2009 Emsley's group showed the possibility of total structure determination of drug-sized organic molecules through the combination of density functional theory and solid-state NMR.

=== Surface catalysis ===
Emsley and co-workers have shown that multi-dimensional solid state NMR can be exploited to chemically and structurally characterize catalytic surface species at a molecular level, such as reaction intermediates and catalytic centres of heterogeneous catalysts.

=== DNP-enhanced surface NMR spectroscopy ===
In the field of surface chemistry, Emsley and co-workers introduced a new approach in the characterization of surfaces through ssNMR, called Surface Enhanced NMR Spectroscopy (SENS). Some systems on various support materials of great chemical interest are below the sensitivity limit of detection for the technique, but such low detection limit can be boosted using DNP, coupled with isotopic labeling and high magnetic fields. This approach enhances surface NMR signals allowing the analysis of near-surface species or materials with surface areas three orders of magnitude lower than before (around 1 m^{2}/g, instead of 1000 m^{2}/g).

Through DNP, transfer of polarization and relevant signal enhancement can occur from the protons of the solvent batch to the rarer nuclei at natural isotopic abundance on the surface framework, including species covalently bonded to the latter one.

Thanks to the description of physicochemically distinct adsorption interactions, new insights can also be offered in hydratation phenomena.

=== Paramagnetic systems ===
Another subject concerns the study of paramagnetic systems, such as 4Fe-4S, high spin Fe(II) catalyst, lanthanide-containing complexes or paramagnetic centers in proteins, with specific attention to the development of NMR methods specifically aimed at paramagnetic solids.

=== Solid-state NMR of proteins and bioaggregates ===
The CRMN was one of the groups developing tools and protocols for the structural and dynamic characterization of proteins in solid phase, including preparations of micro-crystalline samples, role of solvent, paramagnetic systems and sequential assignment, with a progressive introduction thanks to ultra-fast MAS of direct proton acquisition mimicking the sequences used for liquid NMR spectra.

In collaboration with Martin Blackledge his team published some of the first ssNMR methods for the characterization of atom-specific dynamics in biosolids and its relation with solvent behaviour and function, providing detailed insight about the hierarchy of motions in proteins with the increase of temperature.

=== Whole organism NMR ===
With Laurent Ségalat Emsley showed on the model organism Caenorhabditis elegans the possibility to use ssNMR on a whole organism for the understanding of its metabolic pattern and the influence of drug assumption or genetic modifications.

== Honours and awards ==
- 1991: Fellow of the Miller Institute for Basic Research in Science, Berkeley, CA
- 2005: CNRS Silver Medal in Chemistry.
- 2009: EAS Award for Outstanding Achievement in Magnetic Resonance.
- 2010: Luigi Sacconi Medal of the Italian Chemical Society.
- 2011: Fellow of the International Society of Magnetic Resonance.
- 2011: Honorary Member, National Magnetic Resonance Society of India.
- 2012: Senior Member of the Institut Universitaire de France.
- 2012: AMPERE Prize.
- 2012: Grand Prix Charles-Leopold Mayer of the Académie des Sciences
- 2013: European Research Council Advanced Grant
- 2013: Elected Member of the Academia Europaea.
- 2015: Bourke Award 2015 of the Royal Society of Chemistry
- 2015: Fellow of the Royal Society of Chemistry.

== Patents ==
- DE Patent 3839820, Lyndon Emsley & Geoffrey Bodenhausen, "Verfahren zum selektiven Anregen von nmr-Signalen", issued 31 May 1990
- DE Patent 3940633, Lyndon Emsley & Geoffrey Bodenhausen, "Gauss-Impuls-Kaskade", issued 13 June 1991
- US Patent 6184683, Lyndon Emsley; Dimitri Sakellariou & Anne Lesage et al., "Method to improve resolution of two-dimensional heteronuclear correlation spectra in solid-state NMR", issued 6 February 2001
- WO Patent 2004088332, Sabine Hediger; Lyndon Emsley & Jay Baltisberger, "METHOD AND INSTALLATION FOR MULTI-DIMENSIONAL INHOMOGENEOUS-FIELD MAGNETIC RESONANCE IMAGING", issued 14 October 2004
- US Patent 20150219734, "POROUS AND STRUCTURED MATERIALS FOR DYNAMIC NUCLEAR POLARIZATION, PROCESS FOR THEIR PREPARATION AND NMR ANALYSIS METHOD", issued 6 August 2015
