= Moshé Yaniv =

Israeli-French molecular biologist (born 1938)

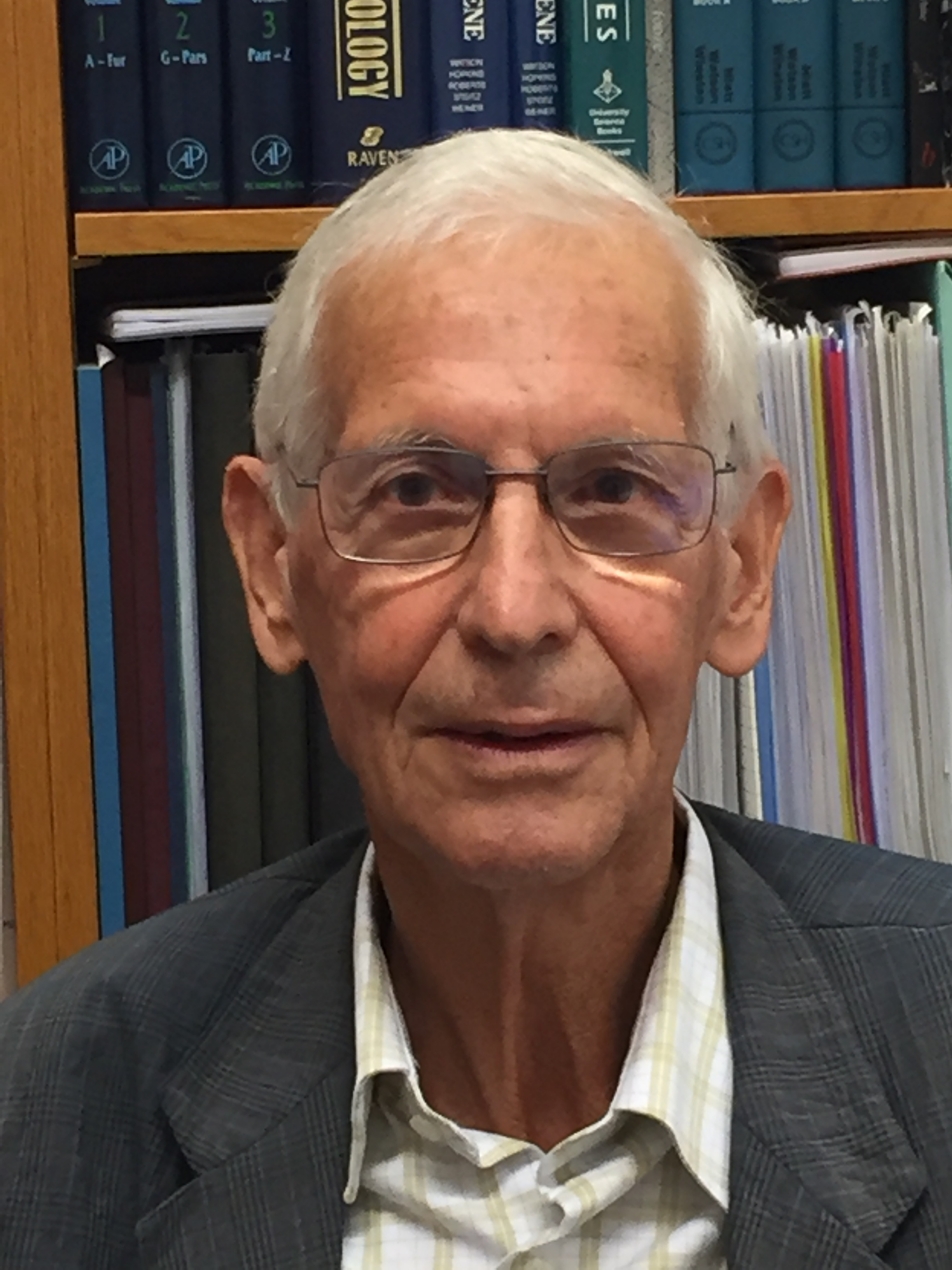
Moshé Yaniv in 2019

Moshe Yaniv, born in 1938 in Hadera, Israel, is a French-Israeli molecular biologist who has studied the structure and functions of oncogenic DNA viruses as well as the general mechanisms for regulating gene expression in higher organisms and their deregulation during tumor pathologies and development. He is a member of the French Academy of sciences and Professor Emeritus at the Institut Pasteur.

== Biography ==
After secondary school in Hadera, Moshe Yaniv studied chemistry at the Hebrew University of Jerusalem (1956-1961) and obtained a "Master of Sciences" in organic chemistry. He joined Professor François Gros' laboratory at the Institute of Physico-chemical Biology to prepare a state thesis in science (1969) on the mechanisms of protein synthesis and the structure of tRNAs.

During his thesis he spent six months in Frederick Sanger's laboratory at the Laboratory of Molecular Biology in Cambridge England, to establish the sequence of several tRNAs and contributed to the establishment of the three-dimensional structure of the tRNA.

At the end of his thesis he then joined Professor Paul Berg's laboratory at Stanford University in California for a postdoctoral fellowship continuing his work on the structure and functions of tRNAs.

Back in France in 1972, he joined the Institut Pasteur as team leader and then as head of the Oncogenic Virus Unit (1975). In 1966, he was appointed Head of Research at the CNRS, in 1972 he became Director of Research and Professor at the Institut Pasteur in 1986.

During his career at the Institut Pasteur, he headed the Molecular Biology Department (1986-1988) and the Biotechnology Department (1992-1994).

== Scientific work ==
From 1972, Moshé Yaniv decided to focus his research on the biology of oncogenic DNA viruses such as Polyome, SV40 and later on papilloma viruses in collaboration with Professor Gérard Orth. It highlights the chromatin structure of the viral genome and the absence of nucleosomes (histone octamers) on the sequences of expression regulation of viral and cellular genes. He identified cellular transcription factors responsible for the expression of viral genes and their functions in regulating cell growth and oncogenic transformation. His team established the sequence of the first human Papillomavirus and identified the different genes of the virus.

His work on gene expression regulation has led him to focus on the role of transcription factors and chromatin remodeling complexes in controlling the development and organogenesis of the liver, pancreas and kidney and to generate mouse models for the study of human metabolic diseases such as diabetes, polycystosis and cancers.

== Distinctions ==
Yaniv is the author of more than 300 publications in the most prestigious biology journals such as Cell, Nature, PNAS, EMBO Journal etc.

Moshé Yaniv was elected a member of EMBO (European Molecular Biology Organization) in 1978 and chaired its board in 1996. Member of Academia Europaea in 1992, member of the French Academy of sciences, 1995, foreign member of the American Academy of Arts and Sciences, 2001 and of the European Academy of Cancer Sciences (2008).

He received a number of prestigious awards and was made a Chevalier of the Légion d'Honneur in 1999.
