= Paolo Sassone-Corsi =

Italian biologist (1956–2020)

- Born: 8 June 1956; Naples, Italy
- Died: 22 July 2020 (aged 64); Irvine, California, United States
- Occupation: Molecular Biologist
- Spouse: Emiliana Borrelli
- Relatives: Emilio Sassone-Corsi (brother) and Lucio Sassone-Corsi (brother)

Paolo Sassone-Corsi (8 June 1956 – 22 July 2020) was an Italian molecular biologist, epigeneticist, and researcher. He is known for his contributions in the areas of transcriptional regulation, epigenetics, circadian biology, and metabolic regulation. He is known for his contributions in the areas of transcriptional regulation, epigenetics, circadian biology, and metabolic regulation. His research primarily focused on the mechanisms that regulate transcription and their relation to metabolism and circadian clocks. His work focused on understanding how the circadian clock regulates metabolic cycles. Most notably, he discovered that SIRT1, a histone deacetylase with a critical role in gene expression and metabolism, is able to regulate the activity of the CLOCK protein. In 2011, Sassone-Corsi founded and directed the “Center for Epigenetics and Metabolism” at the University of California, Irvine.

== Biography ==
Paolo Sassone-Corsi was born in Naples, Italy on June 8, 1956. He devoted himself to science and soccer at an early age. Together with his brother Emilio Sassone-Corsi, they founded the Neapolitan Astronomy Club (Gruppo Astrofili Napoletani) and eventually published a paper on the bands of Saturn. Their works were awarded the Philips Prize for Young Researchers. They worked at the Paris Meudon Observatory where they studied Saturn. His passions grew from astronomy to biology, and eventually genetics.

Sassone-Corsi completed his graduate studies on yeast biology and graduated with a doctorate in biological science from the University of Naples Federico II in 1979. Following this, Sassone-Corsi moved to Strasbourg and went on to complete a post-doctoral fellowship under the instruction of Pierre Chambon at the Institut de Génétique et de Biologie Moléculaire et Cellulaire (IGBMC) in Strasbourg, France. During his time under Chambon, Sassone-Corsi was drawn to transcription mechanisms and contributed to key work on promoters, enhancers and transactivating factors.

In search of innovation, he and his wife moved to San Diego, United States where he worked as a post-doctoral fellow under Inder Verma at the Salk Institute for Biological Studies from 1986 to 1989. At the Salk Institute, most of his work was focused on the study of the intracellular pathway that leads to the activation of proto-oncogenes c-fos and c-jun.

In 1989, he began working as a research director for the French National Centre for Scientific Research at Institut de Génétique et de Biologie Moléculaire et Cellulaire (IGBMC) in Strasbourg, France. He started his own independent laboratory at IGBMC and progressed to the director of research at the Centre National de la Recherche Scientifique. During his time here, Sassone-Corsi identified and characterized the role of the cAMP-responsive element modulator (CREM) in spermatogenesis.

Beginning in 2006, he worked for the University of California, Irvine as a professor and head of chair of the pharmacology department. In 2011, he founded and directed the Center of Epigenetics and Metabolism.

During the course of his life, Sassone-Corsi has published multiple books. In 2013, he published a book of reflections titled "Ti sembra il Caso?: Schermaglia fra un narratore e un biologo", written alongside Erri De Luca. He also wrote another book with Erri De Luca in 2016 about the intersections of biology, music and poetry.

== Scientific contributions ==
Sassone-Corsi's work largely focused on the implementation of molecular approaches for cell signaling, circadian rhythm, epigenetics, and the plasticity of the genome. Through the study of signal transduction mechanisms, he investigated how they modulate nuclear functions such as gene expression, chromatin remodeling, and epigenetic control.

Early research on transcription

During his time as a postdoc, working under the mentorship of Pierre Chambon at IGBCM in 1980, Sassone-Corsi studied transcriptional elements and identified the promoter sequence of the adenovirus major late gene, which later became known as the TATA box. Later, Sassone-Corsi moved to the Salk Institute for Biological Studies and made important advancements in understanding the transcriptional autoregulation of the proto-oncogene, fos. Oncogenes which encode for nuclear proteins include, fos, jun, and p53, just to name a few. As a nuclear oncogene, fos is able to initiate cell growth, differentiation, and development which can cause cancer if over-induced. The c-fos protein contains a "leucine zipper" that allows it to form a heterodimer with jun, another oncogene. In 1988, Sassone-Corsi found that proto-oncogenes c-fos and c-jun are activated through a pathway which regulates transcription; c-fos and c-jun interact with each other to form a homodimer, AP-1, and that c-fos is regulated by cAMP. AP-1 is much more stable than either the fos or jun homodimer and can bind to the necessary promoter sequences much more effectively. As such, AP-1 has a significant role in the cell cycle.

Circadian biology research

In 2006, Sassoni-Corsi illuminated the role of chromatin remodeling in circadian mechanisms through the discovery that CLOCK acts as a histone acetyltransferase (HAT) by recruiting P300 and CBP, allowing it to help restore rhythmicity in Clock mutants. This activity allows CLOCK to control the acetylation of BMAL1 and H3. This was important in demonstrating the role of chromatin remodeling in the core clock mechanism and revealed new associations between cellular physiology and histone acetylation. He later helped discover that the histone deacetylase (HDAC) activity of SIRT1, which is NAD+ dependent, undergoes circadian regulation, counteracts the HAT activity of CLOCK, and has in vivo circadian control. In 2009, Sassone-Corsi also helped discover that NAMPT, a rate-limiting step involved in NAD+ salvaging, has circadian expression regulated by CLOCK:BMAL1. His research found that NAMPT was essential to altering the circadian expression of genes; in the same study, he discovered a transcriptional-enzymatic feedback loop between circadian rhythms and cellular metabolism which was an impactful contribution to investigating the links between the two.

Signaling pathways

Sassone-Corsi was influential in investigating the role of chromatin in signaling with a study he conducted in 2000. He revealed that signaling pathways act directly on chromatin components to regulate certain processes; N-terminal tails of histones are acted upon with reversible covalent modifications to elicit responses in multiple pathways. They investigated the interactions that occur when multiple modifications are present on the N-terminal tails at the same time and proposed that H2B-H3 and H2A-H4 are the tails which act as signaling platforms. His research segued into a broader understanding of the role histone modifications play in the complex circuitries of gene regulation.

Sassone-Corsi looked further into the coupling of histone modifications and found evidence of synergistic coupling of H3 phosphorylation and acetylation in response to epidermal growth factor stimulation. He identified that EGF stimulation activates the MAP kinase pathway which leads to sequential modifications of chromatin.

== Honors and awards ==
- Philips European Award for Young Investigators (1977)
- Member of the European Molecular Biology Organization (1990)
- Medal of the European Molecular Biology Organization (1994)
- Rosen Prize (Fondation de la Recherche Médicale), France (1996)
- Prix Liliane-Bettencourt (1997)
- Segerfalk Award Lecture, Lund University, Sweden (2001)
- ISI Highly Cited (2003)
- Grand Prix Charles-Leopold Mayer of the French Academy of Sciences (2003)
- Edwin B. Astwood Award Lecture of The Endocrine Society, USA (2004)
- The Umesono Memorial Award Lecture, The Salk Institute, San Diego, USA (2004)
- Silver Medal of the French National Centre for Scientific Research (2004)
- Athalie Clarke Achievement Award, University of California, School of Medicine (2010)
- Roy O. Greep Award Lecture, 2011, Laureate Award by The Endocrine Society (2011)
- The Ipsen Award in Endocrinology, France (2011)
- External Member, Max Planck Society, Germany (2011)
- Transatlantic Medal of The Society for Endocrinology, UK (2012)
- Dr. Henry Friesen Plenary Lecture Award, Canada (2013)
- Fellow, American Association for the Advacement of Science, USA (2014)
- August and Marie Krogh Medal, Denmark (2015)
- Leonardo da Vinci Gold Medal, FMSI Federation, Rome, Italy (2016)
- Albert Hogan Memorial Award Lecture, University of Missouri (2017)
- Distinguished Faculty Award for Research, University of California, Irvine (2019)

== Books ==
- Sassone-Corsi, Paolo(editor); T.Fuller, Margaret; Braun, Robert.,(2011), Germ Cells. Cold Spring Harbor Laboratory Press, ISBN 9781936113514
- Sassone-Corsi, Paolo; Christen, Yves.,(2012), Epigenetics, Brain and Behavior. Springer, ISBN 9783642279126
- Sassone-Corsi, Paolo; De Luca, Erri.,(2013), Ti sembra il caso?: Schermaglia fra un narratore e un biologo (Is that right?: Skirmish between a writer and a biologist). Feltrinelli Editore, ISBN 9788807491436
- Sassone-Corsi, Paolo; De Luca, Erri; Valin, Daniele.,(2016), Le cas du Hasard: Escarmouches entre un écrivain et un biologiste (The case of change: Skirmish between a writer and a biologist). Galimard, ISBN 9782070179275
- Sassone-Corsi, Paolo; Christen, Yves.,(2017), A Time for Metabolism and Hormones. Springer, ISBN 9783319270685
- Sassone-Corsi, Paolo(editor); Young, Michael(editor), B.Reddy, Akhilesh.,(2018), Circadian Rhythms. Cold Spring Harbor Laboratory Press, ISBN 9781621821243
