= Journal of Molecular Recognition =

- Discipline: Biochemistry
- Language: English
- Edited by: Rebecca C. Wade

Publication details
- History: 1988-present
- Publisher: John Wiley & Sons
- Frequency: Monthly
- Impact factor: 2.3 (2023)

Standard abbreviations
- ISO 4: J. Mol. Recognit.

Indexing
- CODEN: JMORE4
- ISSN: 0952-3499 (print); 1099-1352 (web)
- LCCN: 91642519
- OCLC no.: 44072811

Links
- Journal homepage; Online access; Online archive

The Journal of Molecular Recognition is a monthly peer-reviewed scientific journal publishing original research papers, perspectives and reviews describing molecular recognition phenomena in biology. The current editor-in-chief is Rebecca C. Wade (Heidelberg Institute for Theoretical Studies and Heidelberg University). Marc H. V. van Regenmortel (École supérieure de biotechnologie Strasbourg) was the editor-in-chief from 1999 to 2023. The journal was established in 1988 with Irwin Chaiken as the founding editor and is published by John Wiley & Sons.

== Abstracting and indexing ==
Journal of Molecular Recognition is abstracted and indexed in:

- Elsevier BIOBASE
- Biochemistry & Biophysics Citation Index
- Biological Abstracts
- BIOSIS Previews
- Chemical Abstracts Service
- Current Contents/Life Sciences
- Index Medicus/MEDLINE
- METADEX
- ProQuest
- Science Citation Index
- SCOPUS
- Web of Science

According to the Journal Citation Reports, the journal has a 2020 impact factor of 2.137, ranking it 53rd out of 72 journals in the category "Biophysics" and 247th out of 297 journals in the category "Biochemistry & Molecular Biology".

== Highest cited papers ==
According to the Web of Science, the most-cited articles of this journal are:

1. "'Automated docking of flexible ligands: Applications of AutoDock", Volume 9, Issue 1, Jan-Feb 1996, Pages: 1–5, Goodsell DS, Morris GM, Olson AJ.
2. "Improving biosensor analysis", Volume 12, Issue 5, Sep-Oct 1999, Pages: 279–284, Myszka DG.
3. "Reversible and irreversible immobilization of enzymes on Graphite Fibrils(TM)", Volume 9, Issue 5–6, Sep-Dec 1996, Pages: 383–388, Dong LW, Fischer AB, Lu M, et al.
4. "Isothermal titration calorimetry and differential scanning calorimetry as complementary tools to investigate the energetics of biomolecular recognition", Volume 12, Issue 1, Jan-Feb 1999, Pages: 3–18, Jelesarov I, Bosshard HR.
