= Denis Duboule =

Swiss-French biologist (born 1955)

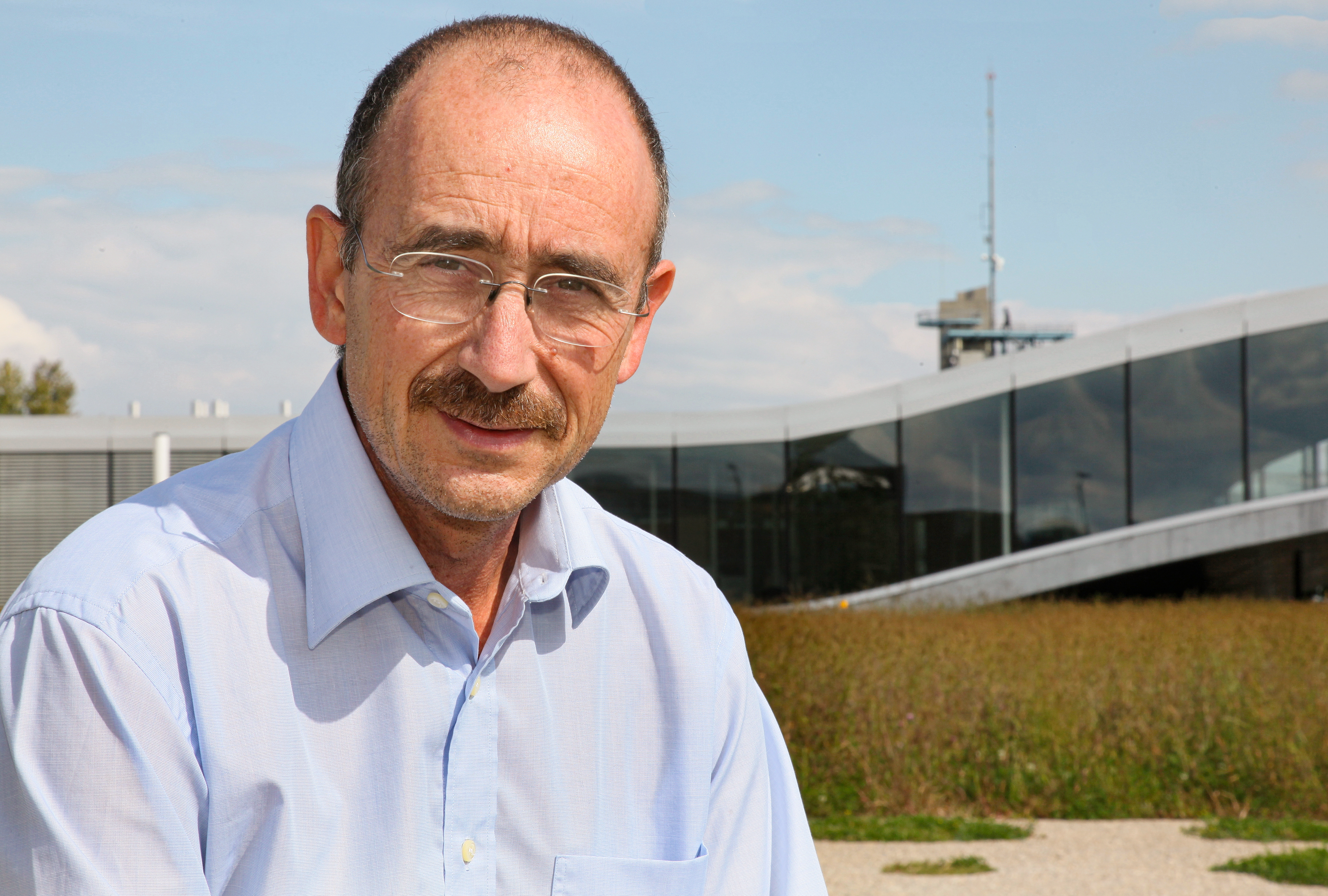
- Denis Duboule in 2010
- Born: February 17, 1955 (age 71); Geneva
- Citizenship: Swiss and French
- Known for: Work on Hox genes
- Awards: Louis-Jeantet Prize for Medicine (1998); Marcel Benoist Prize (2003); Grand Prix Charles-Leopold Mayer (2004); Fellow of the Royal Society
- Scientific career
- Fields: Development biology
- Workplaces: École polytechnique fédérale de Lausanne; University of Geneva; Collège de France

Denis Duboule (born February 17, 1955) is a Swiss-French biologist. He earned his PhD in Biology in 1984 and is currently Professor of Developmental Genetics and Genomics at the École polytechnique fédérale de Lausanne (EPFL) and at the Department of Genetics and Evolution of the University of Geneva. Since 2001, he is the Director of the Swiss National Research Center "Frontiers in Genetics" and since 2017, he is also a professor at the Collège de France. He has notably worked on Hox genes, a group of genes involved in the formation of the body plan and of the limbs.

== Biography ==
Denis Duboule obtained a PhD from the University of Geneva in 1984. After questioning Karl Illmensee's claims of having cloned a mouse, Duboule departed to work as a post-doc and then a group leader at the University of Strasbourg, with Pierre Chambon. In 1988, he became a group leader at the European Molecular Biology Laboratory in Heidelberg, Germany.

In 1992, he obtained a tenure at the Geneva University. From 1997, he has headed the Department of Genetics and Evolution (formerly Zoology and Animal Biology) Since 2001, he has also chaired the NCCR Frontiers in Genetics and, since 2006, he is a full professor at the École polytechnique fédérale de Lausanne (EPFL). In 2017, he was elected professor at the Collège de France, holding the international chair in genome evolution and development.

He is a Fellow of the Royal Society, a member of the National Academy of Sciences, and an occasional columnist in the "Sciences and environment" section of the newspaper Le Temps.

== Scientific contributions ==
Denis Duboule has a longstanding interest in the function and regulation of Hox genes, a family of genes responsible for the organization and evolution of animal body plans. These genes have been a paradigm to understand embryonic patterning, in developmental, evolutionary and pathological contexts. Denis Duboule's contributions are thus in the field of vertebrate developmental genetics with some interface with medical genetics and evolutionary biology. Since 1985, he reported several discoveries related to the biology of homeobox genes, in particular concerning the Hox gene family. A brief account can be found in the article "The Hox complex"

== Honours ==
- Elected member of EMBO (1993)
- National Latsis Prize (1994)
- Elected member of the Academia Europaea (1997)
- Cloëtta Prize for Medicine (1997)
- Louis-Jeantet Prize for Medicine (1998)
- Marcel Benoist Prize (2003)
- Elected foreign member of the Royal Netherlands Academy of Arts and Sciences (2000)
- Grand Prix Charles-Leopold Mayer (2004)
- Elected member of the Swiss Academy of Medical Sciences (2005)
- Elected member of the French Academy of Sciences (2005)
- Elected foreign hon. member of the American Academy of Arts and Sciences (2006)
- Doctorate honoris causa from the École normale supérieure, Paris (2010)
- INSERM International Prize (2010)
- Prix de la Fondation pour Genève (2011)
- Foreign Member of the Royal Society (2012)
- Foreign Member of the National Academy of Sciences (2012)
- A.O. Kovalevsky Medal (2013) from the St. Petersburg Society of Naturalists
