= Charles Léopold Mayer =

French biochemist, humanist and materialist philosopher

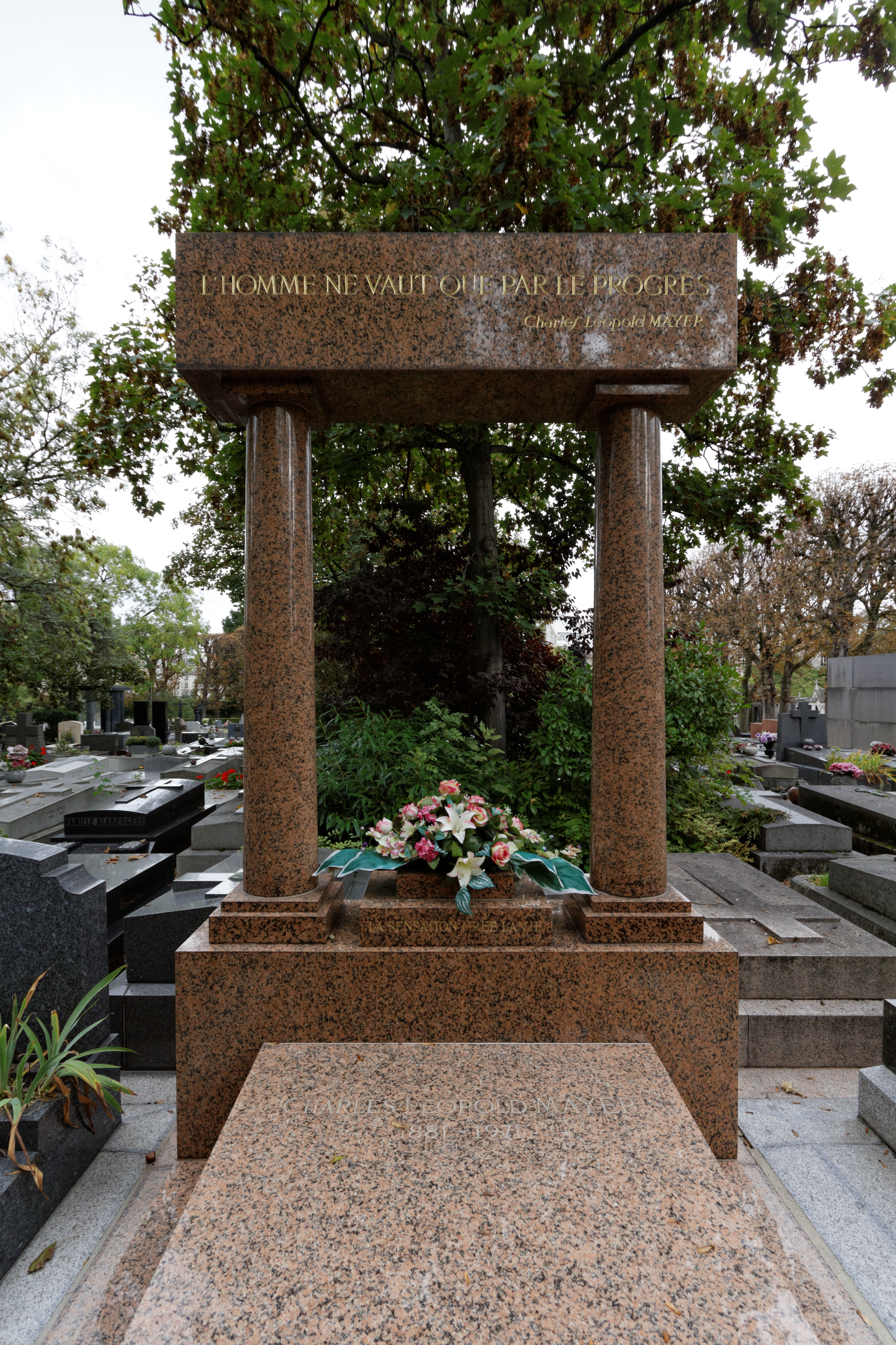
- Mayer's burial at Pere Lachaise Cemetery
- Born: 1881; Paris, France
- Died: 1971 (aged 89–90)
- Occupations: Biochemist, philosopher

Charles Léopold Mayer (1881–1971) was a French biochemist, humanist and materialist philosopher.

== Philosophy and work ==
Mayer was a materialist. He argued that all living matter is "irritable" and responds to stimuli. He explained the phenomena of life without recourse to "final causes". He believed that all organisms from bacteria to humans are conscious. Mayer called his doctrine "sensationalism" which he equated with the irritability of living matter. He held the view that all life, including man's is based on irritability. Thought is consciousness of irritability. According to Mayer "life is linked with sensation and cannot be understood except through sensation". He argued that organisms only know the world by their sensations and that this is a mechanical phenomenon to the effect that there is no design, final cause, supernaturalism or teleology. He subscribed to the materialist views of Epicurus, he commented that "in human affairs, Epicureanism is the only natural ethics which does not demand profound or subtle reasoning." Several of his books were translated by Harold Atkins Larrabee.

Mayer advocated progressionist liberalism and opposed Marxism. His book Man: Mind or Matter? (1951) endorsed a "renovated and rejuvenated philosophy of rationalistic materialism." He opposed the dialectical materialism of Marxism and the pessimistic materialism of the nineteenth century, favoring the ethical individualistic, optimistic materialism of Epicurus. Mayer defined his "progressionistic materialism" as a form of humanism, a "conception of life which may be capable of satisfying our highest and deepest needs." Mayer argued that pleasure is the basis of progressive materialism. He commented that "Nature or more exactly living matter, has no other purpose than to continue to live because it finds great joy in living" and pleasure is a "product of purely material sensations".

In 1982, the Charles Léopold Mayer Foundation for the Progress of Humankind was established.

== Selected publications ==
- Man: Mind or Matter? (Translated and with a Preface by Harold A. Larrabee, 1951)
- Quest of a New Ethics (1954)
- Sensation: The Origin of Life (1961)
- Man Faces His Destiny (Translated by Heloise Norwell, J. S. Norwell and D. C. Fox, 1968)

== See also ==
- Grand Prix Charles-Leopold Mayer
