= Anne Lesage =

French engineer

- Born: July 12, 1969 (age 57)
- Education: Pierre and Marie Curie University; École Centrale Paris
- Scientific career
- Workplaces: French National Centre for Scientific Research
- Thesis: Analyse de la structure tridimentionnelle des protéines par résonance magnétique nucléaire : application à l'étude de la jonction COL1-NC1 des collagènes FACIT et au domaine de fixation à l'ADN du facteur de transcription FRUR (1995)

Anne Lesage (born June 12, 1969) is a French engineer who is a group leader at the French National Centre for Scientific Research. She is based at the High Field NMR Centre of the Lyon Institute of Analytical Sciences, where she develops novel nuclear magnetic resonance approaches to characterise solid-state materials.

== Early life and education ==
Lesage completed her undergraduate degree in engineering at the École Centrale Paris. She moved to the Pierre and Marie Curie University for graduate studies, where she earned a master's degree in biophysics in 1992. Lesage moved to Lyon for doctoral research, where she used NMR to investigate the COL1-NC1 junction.

== Research and career ==
In 1994, Lesage joined the French National Centre for Scientific Research, where she started working at the École normale supérieure de Lyon. She has worked on high-field dynamic nuclear polarisation solid-state nuclear magnetic resonance. In such an experiment, the polarisation of unpaired electrons is transferred to nuclei that are close by. This enhances the signal by an amount proportional to the gyromagnetic ratio of the electron and the polarised nucleus. The technique has been improved since the 1990s, including the development of advanced equipment and design of stable sources of polarisation (organic radicals). Solid-state nuclear magnetic resonance can provide information about structure-property relationships in emerging materials, and Lesage has shown that by making use of dynamic nuclear polarization signal intensity can be improved and porous and non-porous materials characterised. The technique, DNP Surface Enhanced NMR Spectroscopy (DNP SENS), involves combining a free radical into a material (e.g. via the addition of few drops of polarising solution). This polarisation is transferred to the protons of solvent under irradiation with microwaves, and to surface protons via proton spin diffusion. DNP SENS has application in the characterisation of nanomaterials for advanced technologies and in the characterisation of complex pharmarceuticals.

== Awards ==
- 2010 French National Centre for Scientific Research Cristal Medal
- 2010 Medal of the Ecole Normale Supérieure de Lyon
- 2017 Elected International Society of Magnetic Resonance Fellow
- 2018 French Academy of Sciences Prix Jaffé
- 2018 French Academy of Sciences Berthelot medal

== Selected publications ==
- Aaron J Rossini; Alexandre Zagdoun; Moreno Lelli; Anne Lesage; Christophe Copéret; Lyndon Emsley (21 March 2013). "Dynamic nuclear polarization surface enhanced NMR spectroscopy". Accounts of Chemical Research. 46 (9): 1942–1951. doi:10.1021/ar300322x. ISSN 0001-4842. PMID 23517009. Wikidata Q38091700.
- Anne Lesage; Moreno Lelli; David Gajan; et al. (1 November 2010). "Surface enhanced NMR spectroscopy by dynamic nuclear polarization". Journal of the American Chemical Society. 132 (44): 15459–15461. doi:10.1021/ja104771z. ISSN 0002-7863. PMID 20831165. Wikidata Q60355471.
- Alexandre Zagdoun; Gilles Casano; Olivier Ouari; et al. (20 August 2013). "Large molecular weight nitroxide biradicals providing efficient dynamic nuclear polarization at temperatures up to 200 K.". Journal of the American Chemical Society. 135 (34): 12790–12797. doi:10.1021/ja405813t. ISSN 0002-7863. PMID 23961876. Wikidata Q46356823.
