= Marc H. V. van Regenmortel =

Belgian virologist (1934–2024)

Marc Hubert Victor van Regenmortel (6 December 1934 – 21 November 2024) was a Belgian virologist known for his work on virus classification. After living in Brussels for the first two decades of his life, he moved to South Africa, where he earned his Ph.D. from the University of Cape Town in 1961. He was Director of Research at the Centre national de la recherche scientifique Immunochemistry Laboratory at the University of Strasbourg from 1978 to 2001. He was president of the International Committee on Taxonomy of Viruses from 1996 to 2002. He was the editor-in-chief of the Archives of Virology for twenty years prior to retiring in 2018. He continued to serve as editor-in-chief of both the Journal of Molecular Recognition and the Journal of AIDS & Clinical Research. In June 2018, a symposium was held in his honor to mark his retirement as editor-in-chief of Archives of Virology. The symposium was organized by Springer Nature and chaired by Tim Skern, van Regenmortel's successor as the journal's editor-in-chief. He died on 21 November 2024, at the age of 89.
