= Institute of Analytical Sciences =

French research institute

Coordinates: 45.7791°N 4.8755°E

Institute of Analytical Sciences (ISA)
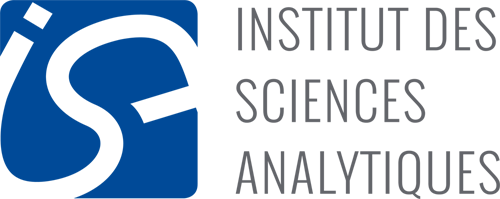
- Established: 2011
- Field of research: Analytical chemistry
- Staff: ~200
- Location: 5, rue de la Doua, 69100 Villeurbanne, France
- CNRS: Unité Mixte de Recherche (UMR) 5280
- Affiliations: CNRS, Claude Bernard University Lyon 1, Ecole Normale Supérieure de Lyon
- Operating agency: Ministère de l'Enseignement supérieur et de la Recherche
- Website: http://isa-lyon.fr

Located within the Cité lyonnaise de l’environnement et de l’analyse, the Institute of Analytical Sciences (UMR 5280) is a French research, training and expertise center specializing in analytical chemistry. It is a Joint Research Unit (French: Unité mixte de recherche or UMR) affiliated with the National Centre for Scientific Research (CNRS), Claude Bernard University Lyon 1, and École normale supérieure de Lyon.

== Research ==
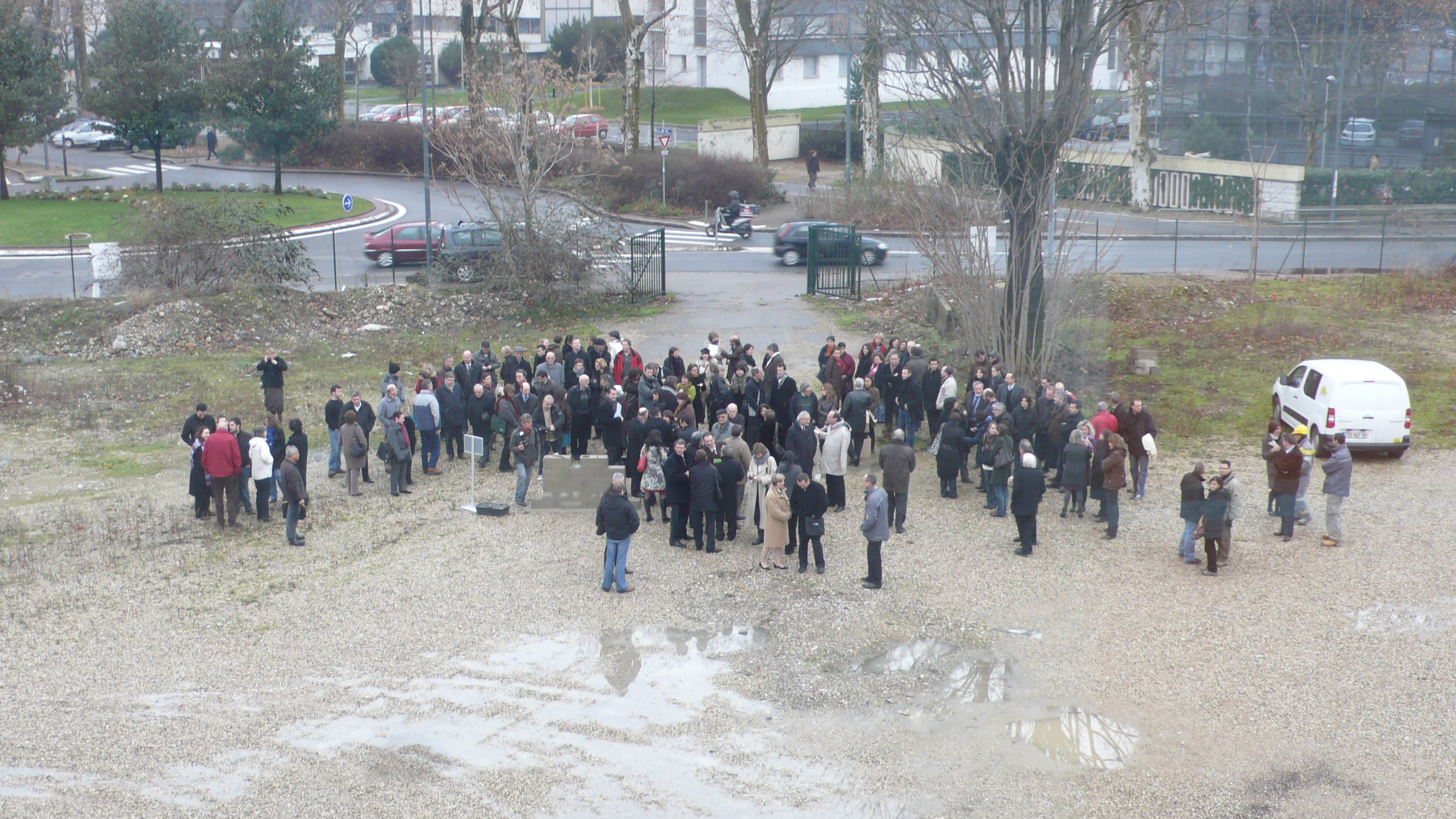
induction ceremony of the main ISA building, January 2010

The Institute brings together over 200 technical and scientific staff with a panel of expertise ranging from theoretical chemistry to physics, through modeling, biochemistry, and analytical chemistry. The ISA also has a tip and global instrumentation equipment: NMR spectrometer (1Ghz), hosted by the «Very High Fields NMR European Center» (CRMN Lyon, France).

The Institute organized its research activities in five areas:

- mass spectrometry
- modeling and applied analysis
- NMR spectroscopy
- separative sciences and surfaces
- (bio)Interfaces, micro / nanosystems.

The research focuses on developing new methods through technological innovation in the analysis of complex systems in all fields, with applications in biomedicine, calculation methods, environment, materials science and structural biology.

== Partnerships ==
Its activities are focused on both fundamental objectives in analytical sciences and interactions with the socio-economic environment at local, national and international levels. The Institute has partnerships with international research centers (e.g. MIT, the École Polytechnique Fédérale de Lausanne, International Agency for Research on Cancer) and national academic partners (e.g. LabexIMUST, Institut de recherches sur la catalyse et l'environnement de Lyon, Institut lumière matière ...) and industrial partners (BioMérieux, Bluestar Silicones, Sanofi, Solvay, Total) and manufacturers (Agilent, Bruker, Waters ...).

The institute is involved in competitiveness clusters (Axelera, Lyonbiopôle, Techtera, Plastipolis) and regional cluster (Cancéropôle Lyon Auvergne Rhône-Alpes). Some scientists are experts in standardization committees at national and European levels. In addition, the Institute of Analytical Sciences plays a «Business incubator» role and hosts start-ups: ANAQUANT,BIOASTER metabolomics technical platform, etc.

== Education ==
The institute also contributes to the undergraduate programs and university studies as well as continuing vocational trainings. Academic staff is involved in several master programs and coordinates two of them. The institute is also engaged in an Erasmus Mundus master, «EACH» (Excellence in Analytical Chemistry), and the «pNMR Marie Curie Initial network». Regarding vocational training, the institute provides several trainings in a wide range of analytical techniques.
