= Jean Dénarié =

French biologist (born 1940)

Jean Dénarié (born 26 October 1940) is a French biologist, member of the French Academy of sciences since December 2008.

Emeritus research director at the Institut national de la recherche agronomique (INRA), his research has focused on the symbiosis between legumes and nitrogen-fixing bacteria.

== Biography ==
In 1962, Jean Dénarié joined INRA, in the soil microbiology laboratory in Versailles. After 5 years of work, he began to study the symbiosis between legumes and nitrogen-fixing bacteria of the genus rhizobium.

In 1981, Jean Dénarié merged his laboratory with the one run by Pierre Boitard, who used molecular genetic methods to study the interactions between plants and pathogenic microorganisms. The new laboratory is located in Toulouse, in direct affiliation with INRA and CNRS. The research teams are joined by cytologist Georges Truchet and mass spectrometry biochemist Jean-Claude Promé. The team made the major discovery of the Nod factors. The team was able to verify that the purified Nod factors could stimulate the development of the root system. Their discovery makes it possible to increase the yields of soya, groundnut, pea and alfalfa crops. Patents are filed, a partnership with an industrial group is initiated, and in 2004 the production of Rhizobium inoculants enriched with Nod factors begins. In 2011, 2 million hectares of crops were fed with nod1 factors.

Jean Dénarié's work has since focused on the myc factor and its effects on the root and nutritional system of plants.

On 16 December 2008, Jean Dénarié was elected a member of the Academy of Sciences in the Integrative Biology section.

== Other functions ==
- President of the Scientific Commission "Molecular and Cellular Biology" of INRA (1989-1993)
- Co-editor of The Plant Journal (1997-2000)
- Coordinator of the international Human Frontier Science Program project (1992-1995)
- Member of the French Society of Genetics
- Member of the French Society of Plant Biology
- Member of the International Society for Molecular Plant-Microbe Interactions

== Prizes and awards ==
- Officer of the Ordre du Mérite Agricole
- Winner of Grand Prizes from the French Academy of sciences (1993, 2005)
- French citation laureate (1981-1998) from the ISI (Institute for Scientific Information)
- Laurier d'excellence de l'INRA (2007)
- Gold medal of the Académie d'agriculture de France (2011)
