= Institut de biologie moléculaire et cellulaire =

French research institute

Coordinates: 48°34′47″N 7°45′53″E

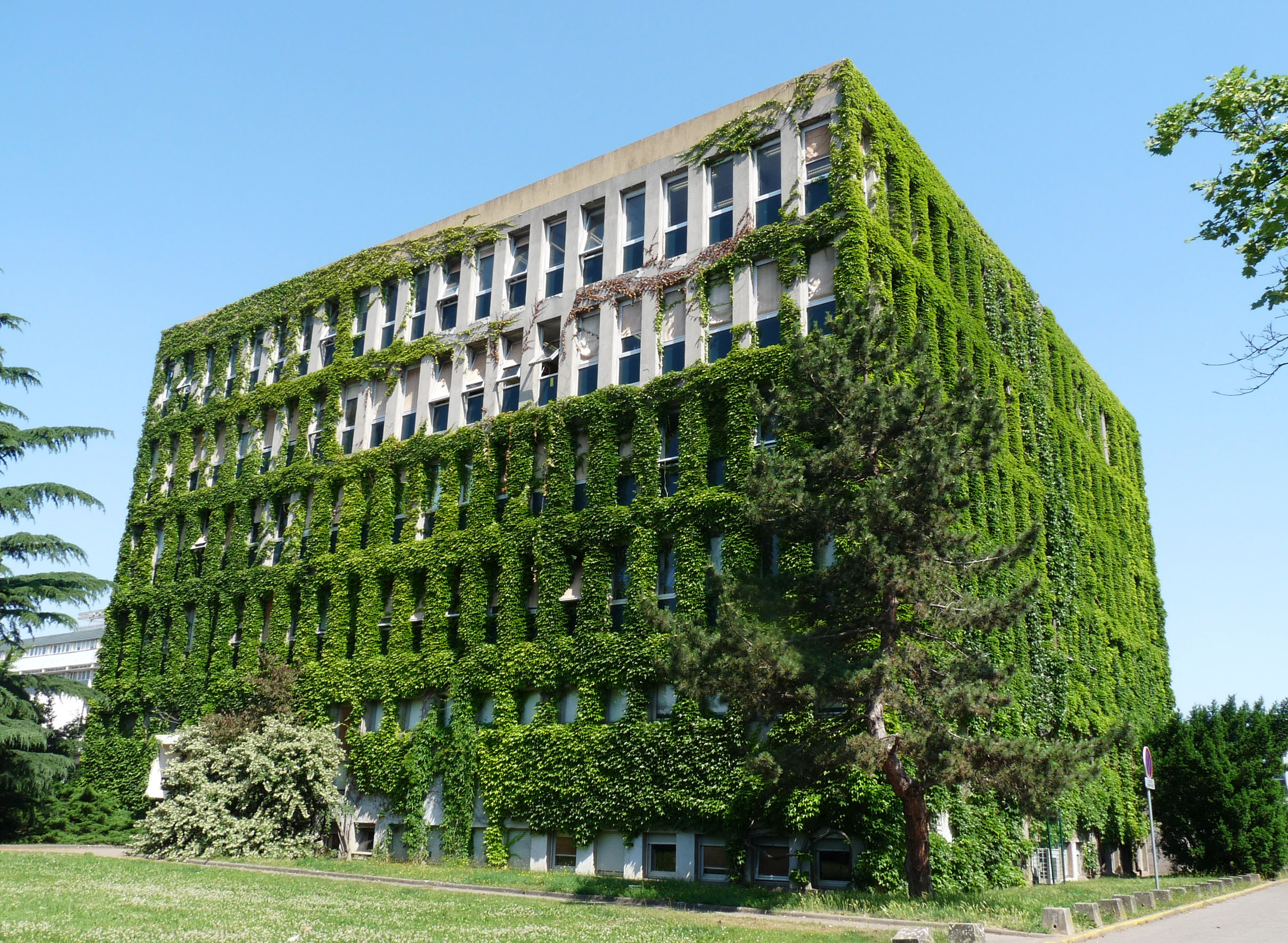
IBMC

The Institut de biologie moléculaire et cellulaire (IBMC) is a research institute of molecular and cellular biology that is owned by the French National Centre for Scientific Research and operated by the University of Strasbourg.
