= Joël Bockaert =

French biologist

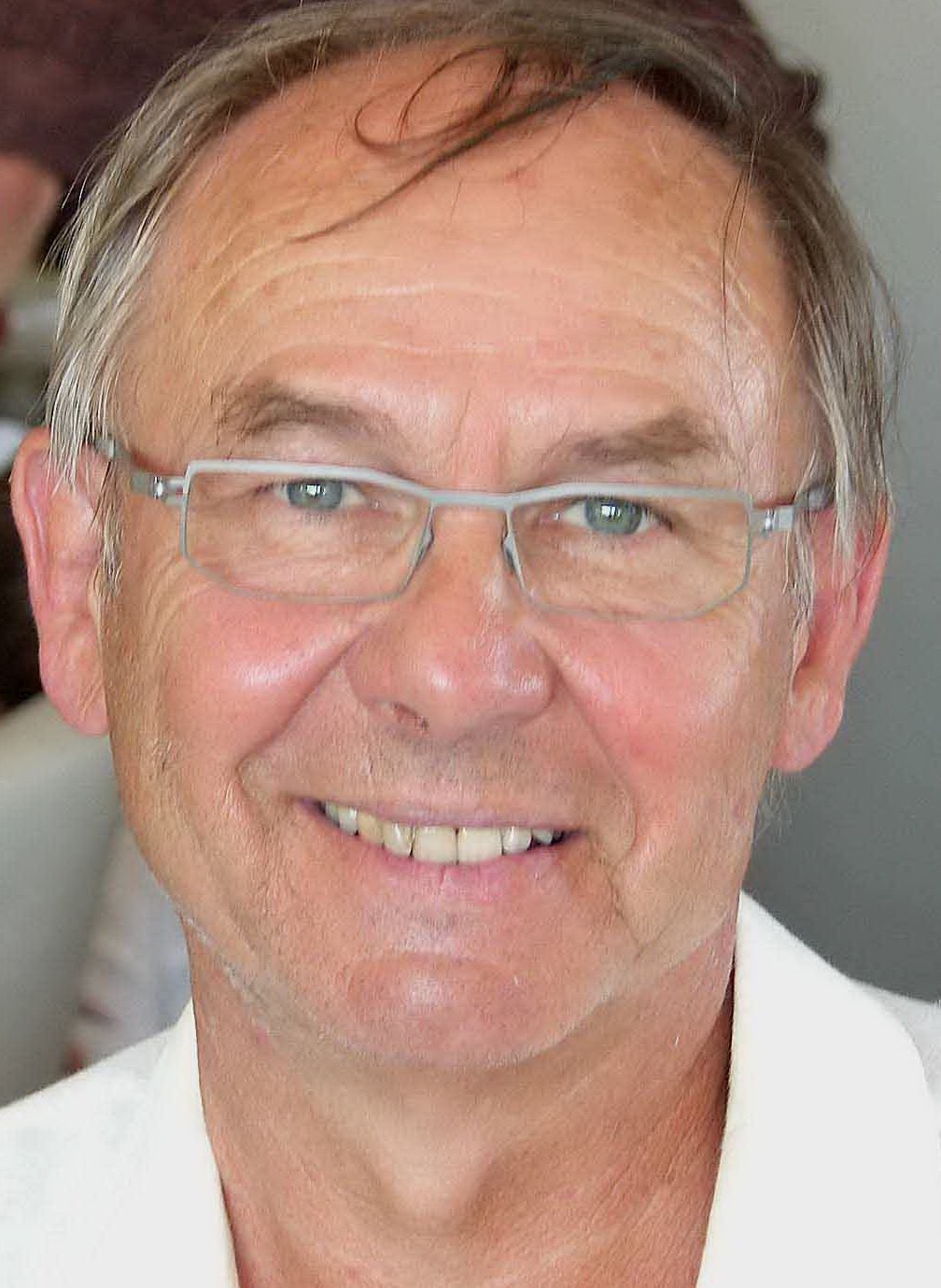
Joël Bockaert, Member of the French Academy of science

Joël Bockaert (born 3 October 1945, in Roubaix) is a French biologist.

== Biography ==
He was a student at the École Normale d'Instituteur in Mérignac (33) from 1961 to 1964 and at the École Normale supérieure-Rue d'Ulm-Paris from 1964 to 1968.

Graduate in Natural Sciences (1968), he completed his thesis work at the Collège de France and his post-doctoral internship at Northwestern University in Chicago. He was successively a professor at the University of Paris VI (1968–73), deputy director of the Chair of Cell Physiology at the Collège de France (1973–82) before being, in Montpellier, Director of Research at the CNRS (1982-2001) then Professor at the University of Montpellier (2001-2014).

In Montpellier, he founded the CNRS-INSERM Institute of Pharmacology-Endocrinology (1982), of which he was Director from 1990 to 2005 and then the Institute of Functional Genomics. In 2013, he became Director of the Biology and Health Department of Montpellier.

== Scientific work ==
Joël Bockaert's work has been devoted to the study of intercellular communications and in particular those involved in the brain.

Joël Bockaert was one of the pioneers in the study of molecules responsible for recognizing and interpreting the messages of intercellular communication known as "receptors". He specialized in the study of a family of receptors called "G-protein coupled receptors or GPCGs". He will discover some of them, including oxytocin, vasopressin, metabotropic brain glutamate and serotonin receptors. The latter modulate cognitive and emotional functions. The family of GPCRs is of considerable physiological importance. It is these receptors that capture light (ensuring vision), which recognize bitter, sweet or umami tastes, smells but also the majority of hormones and neurotransmitters1,2.

Given their roles, these receptors are the direct or indirect target of more than 40% of drugs sold in pharmacies to treat hypertension, allergies, migraine, depression, parkinson's disease or pain.

== Societies and academies ==
1992-1995 President of the Society of Neurosciences

1996: Member of EMBO

He was elected a corresponding member of the French Academy of sciences in 1996 and a member in 2003.

In 2017, he became a member of the Academy of sciences and letters of Montpellier

== Awards and honours ==
- Rochat-Julliard Prize of the French Academy of sciences
- Charles-Léopold Mayer Grand Prize of the Academy of Sciences
- Lilly - ECNP Prize
- Honorary Professor of Huazhong University (China) and recipient of the China and Friendship Award
- Doctor Honoris Causa Université libre de Bruxelles

=== Decorations ===
- Chevalier of the Légion d'Honneur
- Chevalier of the Palmes Académiques
