= François Gros =

French biologist (1925–2022)

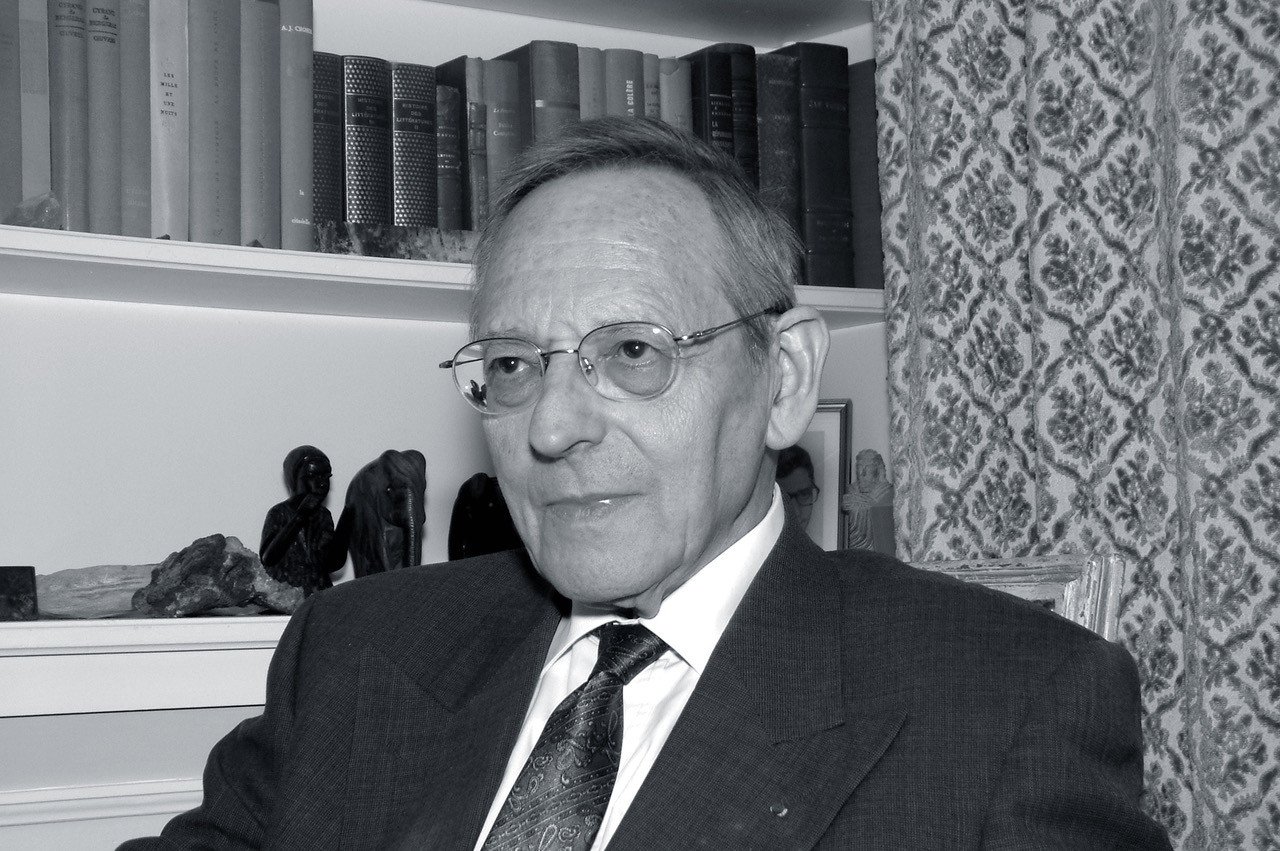
- Born: 24 April 1925; Paris, France
- Died: 18 February 2022 (aged 96)
- Other names: Several, while in hiding from Nazi persecution
- Education: University of Toulouse, Sorbonne
- Known for: Role in the discovery of mRNA
- Awards: Pius XI Medal (1964); Grand Prix Charles-Leopold Mayer (1968); Order of the Polar Star (1980); Gay-Lussac Humboldt Prize (1988); Order of the Rising Sun (1997); Nehru Medal (1999); Grand Officer of the National Order of the Legion of Honour (2012); Grand Cross of the National Order of Merit (2017)
- Scientific career
- Fields: Biochemistry
- Workplaces: CNRS, University of Illinois Rockefeller Institute, Collège de France, Pasteur Institute

François Gros (French pronunciation: [fʁɑ̃swa ɡʁo]; 24 April 1925 – 18 February 2022) was a French biologist and one of the pioneers of cellular biochemistry in France. His scientific career concerned genes and their role in regulating cellular functions.

== Career ==
François Gros studied at the Faculty of Science of the Sorbonne. Previously he had enrolled in error (see below: Personal life) at the Faculty of Sciences in Toulouse. After a junior position at the CNRS he was awarded a Rockefeller grant to study in the laboratory of microbiology of the University of Illinois and in the Rockefeller Institute. He entered the CNRS in 1957 as Maître de Recherche and later as Directeur de Recherche.

In 1968 he became Professor in the Faculty of Science in Paris, where he became Chair of the Microbiology Department. In 1972 he became Professor at the Institut Pasteur, head of biochemistry. In parallel he was Professor at the Collège de France as Chair of cellular biochemistry.

Honorary professor at the Collège de France, member of the Institute of France, and also director of the Pasteur Institute from 1976 to 1982. In this last capacity during 1981 to 1985 he acted as advisor to two Prime Ministers, Pierre Mauroy and Laurent Fabius. Partially as a consequence of this he became involved in the health scandal of contaminated blood (fr:Affaire du sang contaminé) when many haemophilia patients were transfused with blood containing HIV.

== Research ==
François Gros is best known for his role in the discovery of mRNA and further work on RNA and ribosomes. This was published simultaneously with the report by another group of the same discovery.

== Honours ==
Elected correspondent (1977) then member (1979) of the French Academy of Sciences, he was permanent secretary from 1991 to 2000.

== Personal life ==
François Gros was born in Paris on 24th April 1925, son of Alexandre Gros and Yvonne Pauline née Haguenauer, from a secular Jewish family. During the Second World War he fled first to Brive and then took refuge in Toulouse, changing names several times. Although he was planning to study medicine, he mistakenly enrolled at the Faculty of Sciences in Toulouse to study botany before moving to Paris and the Sorbonne.

He died at the age of 96, also in Paris, on the 18th February 2022. He was married with three children.
