= Gérard Orth =

French virologist (1936–2023)

Gérard Charles Jacques Orth (7 February 1936 – 4 September 2023) was a French virologist, emeritus research director at the CNRS, honorary professor at the Pasteur Institute.

Gérard Orth had devoted his research to the study of the role of viruses in the genesis of human cancers. His research had focused on papillomaviruses and their association with benign tumours and skin and cervical cancers. He was a member of the French Academy of sciences.

== Biography ==
Gérard Orth was a graduate of the École nationale vétérinaire d'Alfort (1959), the Institut Pasteur (1960) and the faculté des sciences de Paris (1963–1964). His scientific activities took place at the Gustave Roussy Institute (IGR), Villejuif, in Claude Paoletti's Laboratory (1962–1979), then at the Pasteur Institute (IP), Paris (1980–2023). He was a statutory researcher at INRA (1963–1965), CNRS (1966–2001), Institut Pasteur (1992–2003; guest researcher since 2004). He had directed several laboratories: Research Unit on the viral etiology of human cancers, IGR (1975–1979); HPV Unit, IP (1980–2003); Unit 190 Inserm (1977–2000). Head of the Virology Department, IP (1991–1996, 2001–2003). Orth died on 4 September 2023, at the age of 87.

== Scientific works ==
Gérard Orth focused his research on the role of papillomaviruses (PV) in the genesis of benign tumours and skin and cervical cancers using epidermodysplasia verruciforme (EV), a rare autosomal recessive skin disease, associated with a high risk of skin carcinomas (in collaboration with Stefania Jablonska) and PV-induced warts and skin cancers in rabbits as models. Many original contributions to the knowledge of the plurality of human PVs infecting the skin and mucous membranes, their biology, pathogenicity or oncogenic potential, to understanding the mechanisms and factors involved in the expression of the biological properties of PV, in particular, genetic factors, and to preventing associated diseases. Coordinated with Philippe Sansonetti the drafting of a report by the French Academy of sciences on the control of infectious diseases, in the context of the concept "One health, one medicine", and that of a report by the Académie vétérinaire de France on research in national veterinary schools.

== Honours and awards ==
- Delahautemaison Prize from the Foundation for Medical Research (1979).
- Antoine Lacassagne Prize of the National Cancer League (1982).
- Rosen Prize from the Foundation for Medical Research (1982).
- Silver medal of the CNRS (1983).
- Robert Koch Prize (1985).
- Henry and Mary-Jane Mitjavile Prize from the National Academy of Medicine (1988).
- Medal of Honor, International Agency for Research on Cancer (1993).
- Leopold Griffuel Prize (1997).
- Elected member of the Academia Europaea (1995), the Académie vétérinaire de France (2003) and the French Academy of sciences, correspondent (1996), full member (2004).
- Foreign associate member of the Polish Academy of Sciences (1997).
- Chevalier of the Légion d'honneur (1996).
- Officer in the Ordre du Mérite (2012).
