= Jean-Charles Schwartz =

French neurobiologist, pharmacist and researcher

Jean-Charles Schwartz, born on May 28, 1936, in Paris, is a French neurobiologist, pharmacist and researcher. Husband of Ketty Schwartz, née Gersen (1937–2007) and father of Olivier, Marc and Emmanuelle. He is a member of the Academy of Sciences. He developed pitolisant, the first clinically approved antagonist for H3 receptors.

== Biography ==
Jean-Charles Schwartz holds a doctorate in pharmacy (Paris, 1960), a doctorate in science (Paris, 1965) and a diploma from the Institut de Pharmacodynamie et Pharmacotechnie (Paris, 1961). He was Professor of Physiology at the Faculties of Pharmacy of the Universities of Haute Normandie and Paris 5-René Descartes (1968–2001) and Professor of Neuropharmacology at the Institut Universitaire de France (1990–2000).

He was a pharmacy internist (1958–1963), assistant at the Central Hospital Pharmacy (1964–1968) and then Chief Pharmacist at the Assistance Public-Hôpitaux de Paris (1968–1999).

He headed the "Neurobiology and Pharmacology" and then "Neurobiology and Molecular Pharmacology" units of the Institut national de la santé et de la recherche médicale (Inserm) from 1972 to 2001. He was vice-chairman of the Board of Directors of Inserm (1999–2002).

He co-founded with Dr. Jeanne-Marie Lecomte the pharmaceutical research/development and commercialisation companies Bioprojet (1981), Bioprojet Pharma (1992) and Bioprojet Biotech (2001). He is the Scientific Director of Bioprojet since 2001.

== Scientific career ==
Jean-Charles Schwartz, a specialist in the neurobiology and pharmacology of brain chemical mediators, has discovered and developed new classes of drugs, mainly in neuropsychiatry.

He studied the brain functions of histamine and dopamine. He established the role of histamine as a neurotransmitter in brain: he described its metabolic pathways, identified the main histaminergic neuronal pathways, identified and located the receptors (H1, H2 and H3) mediating its actions. His description of the role of histaminergic neurons in vigilance control has contributed to the development of second-generation antihistamines devoid of sedative effects. He discovered the H3 receptor, demonstrated the role of its strong constitutive activity in controlling the activity of cerebral histaminergic neurons, developed the first selective ligands of this receptor and developed pitolisant, (Wakix®), a wake-promoting and anticataplectic agent now currently used for the treatment of patients with narcolepsy.

Having hypothesized the existence of several types of dopamine receptors, Jean-Charles Schwartz and his collaborators identified by cloning the two splicing isoforms of the D2 receptor, then the D3 receptor. He developed the first selective ligands of the D3 receptor and used them to demonstrate the involvement of this receptor in drug dependence and the action of antipsychotic drugs. It has shown the involvement of receptor modulations in changes in the effects of chronically administered psychotropic agents, processes responsible for tolerance and dependence.

In the field of neuropeptides, Jean-Charles Schwartz created the concept of "inactivation neuropeptidases" by identifying the enzymes responsible for the metabolic inactivation of enkephalins and cholecystokininin and developed the first selective inhibitors of these enzymes, the latters used as research tools and then, from one of them thas therapeutic agent. He has clinically developed racecadotril (Tiorfan®), a neprilysin ("enkephalinase") inhibitor, the first selective intestinal anti-secretory agent that has been used as an antidiarrheal agent by several million patients.

He also discovered by cloning several subtypes of brain serotonin receptors (5HT6, 5HT7), and established the neurotransmitter role of anandamide, an endogenous ligand of cannabinoid receptors.

He is the author of more than 700 publications.

== Awards and honours ==
- Gold medal of internists at the Paris Hospital Boarding School (1962).
- Grand Prize for Chemical and Natural Sciences (1983) and Charles-Léopold-Mayer Grand Prize of the Academy of Sciences - Institut de France (1991)
- Eli-Lilly Prize from the European College of Neuropsychopharmacology (1994).
- Honorary doctorate from the University of Berlin (1997).
- Prize of the Collegium Internationale Neuropsychopharmacologicum (1998).
- Ariëns Prize of the Dutch Society of Pharmacology (1998).
- Galien Prize (2001).
- Laureate of the Institute for Scientific Information "Highly cited researcher" (2001).
- Prize of the Order of Pharmacists of the National Academy of Pharmacy (2002).
- Grand Prize of the Foundation for Medical Research (2009).
- Grand Prize of the National Academy of Pharmacy (2017).
- Knight of the Legion of Honour (2009).

== Membership of learned societies ==
- European College of Neuropsychopharmcology (ECNP)
- International College of Neuropsychopharmacology (CINP)
- American Association for the Advancement of Sciences
- Society of Pharmacology and experimental Therapeutics

== Membership of Academies ==
- Academy of Sciences (2002)
- Academia Europaea(1994)
