= Mendel Lectures =

Mendel Lectures' logo with black outline

The Mendel Lectures is a series of lectures given by the world's top scientists in genetics, molecular biology, biochemistry, microbiology, medicine and related areas which has been held in the refectory of the Augustian Abbey of St. Thomas in Brno, Czech Republic since May 2003. The lectures were established to celebrate the 50th anniversary of the discovery of the structure of deoxyribonucleic acid (DNA) by James Watson (1928) and Francis Crick (1916-2004). The Mendel Lectures are named in honour of Gregor Johann Mendel (1822-1884), the founder of genetics, who lived and worked in the Augustinian Abbey in Brno 1843-1884. Based on his experiments conducted in the abbey between 1856 and 1863, Mendel established the basic rules of heredity, now referred to as the laws of Mendelian inheritance. The Mendel Lectures are organized by the Masaryk University, the Mendel Museum, and the St. Anne's University Hospital Brno. The twentieth season of the Mendel Lectures is running at present. More than 150 top scientists, including many Nobel Prize winners, have visited Brno to give a Mendel Lecture, such as Tim Hunt, Jack W. Szostak, John Gurdon, Elizabeth Blackburn, Paul Nurse, Venkatraman Ramakrishnan, Günter Blobel, Kurt Wüthrich, Jules A. Hoffmann, Aaron Ciechanover, Ada Yonath, Paul Modrich, Eric F. Wieschaus, Fraser Stoddart, Ben Feringa, Richard Henderson, Svante Pääbo, Gary Ruvkun, Michael Rosbash, Brian K. Kobilka, Susumu Tonegawa, Randy W. Schekman, Thomas R. Cech and Emmanuelle Charpentier.

== History ==
The first idea of the Mendel Lectures occurred during the international conference ´EMBO Workshop: Genetics after the Genome´ organised by Dieter Schweizer and Kim Nasmyth in 2002. Kim Nasmyth, at the time director of the Research Institute of Molecular Pathology, and his wife Anna Nasmyth, Imma Mautner Markhof from Austria, Jan Motlík of the Academy of Sciences of the Czech Republic and Jiřina Relichová of the Masaryk University prepared and organized the very first series of Mendel Lectures. They named the series „The Road to the DNA“ and focused the lectures on the historical context of genetics. The two first speakers, Sir Walter Bodmer from Oxford and Charles Weissmann from London, gave their talks in the Augustinian Abbey in Old Brno on May 13, 2003. Subsequent series have addressed more topical scientific findings. Since 2003, more than 130 top scientists, including many Nobel Prize winners, have visited Brno to give a Mendel Lecture.

The Mendel Lectures are also connected with the establishment of the Mendel Museum and revitalization of scientific activities in the Augustinian Abbey in Old Brno in 2003 in the event of the 50th anniversary of the discovery of the structure of deoxyribonucleic acid (DNA). The British Council donated a copy of the original photograph of James Watson and Francis Crick and a copy of their model of DNA from 1953 is on loan from Gustav Ammerer to the Mendel Museum.

Initially, the Mendel Lectures were financially supported by the geneticist Gustav Ammerer from Vienna through his charity Vereinigung zur Förderung der Genomforschung, by the Academy of Sciences of the Czech Republic and by the British Council. Realization of the Mendel Lectures have been also supported by the Masaryk University, Authority of the South Moravian Region, the City of Brno, and the IMP Vienna. Between 2012 and 2014 the lectures were funded by the grant of the Czech Ministry of Education and the European Union (project Pluricell). Since 2015, the Mendel Lectures are supported by the International Clinical Research Center of St. Anne's University Hospital Brno and its project ICRC. From 2016 Masaryk University established Seminar Series and contributes with an essential financial funding.

== Present ==
The Mendel Lectures are now mainly focused on combining cutting-edge interdisciplinary approaches, technologies and methods of biochemistry, biophysics, molecular biology, computational modelling, imaging, microbiology, cell biology, physiology, genetics, toxicology, developmental biology, evolutionary biology and medicine.

The program of the Mendel Lectures is prepared by a scientific committee composed of Aaron Ciechanover (Technion-Israel Institute of Technology, Haifa, Israel), Lumir Krejci (Masaryk University, Czech Republic), Titia deLange (The Rockefeller University, USA), Petr Svoboda (Institute of Molecular Genetics of the ASCR, v. v. i. Prague, Czech Republic), Herbert Waldmann (Max Planck Institute, Germany). Mendel Lectures are now organized by Kamil Paruch, Dalibor Blažek, and Gabriela Pavlíková from Masaryk University, in cooperation with the Mendel Museum and the International Clinical Research Center (ICRC) at St. Anne's University Hospital.

== List of speakers ==
Series	Nr.	Date	Speaker	Institution	Lecture title	Nobel	Notes
2002/2003	1	May 13, 2003	Sir Walter Bodmer	Institute of Molecular Medicine, Oxford, UK	"The human genome: Past, present & future"		
2002/2003	2	May 13, 2003	Charles Weissmann	Institute of Neurology, London, UK	"The role of DNA in prion diseases"		
2002/2003	3	June 5, 2003	Horace Judson	George Washington University, USA	"Before the structure: The roots of the evolution in biology"		
2003/2004	4	September 29, 2003	Sir Tim Hunt	Cancer Research UK, Clare Hall Laboratories, UK	"Cells and their division"	Nobel prize 2001	
2003/2004	5	October 16, 2003	Sir David Hopwood	John Innes Centre, Norwich, UK	"Fifty years of Streptomyces genetics: Implications for antibiotic discovery"		
2003/2004	6	October 30, 2003	Anne McLaren	The Wellcome Trust / Cancer Research UK, Cambridge, UK	"Mendel and Michurin today"		
2003/2004	7	November 11, 2003	Emil Paleček	Academy of Sciences of the Czech Republic, Brno	"DNA double helix in Czechoslovakia. Electrochemical DNA sensors"		
2003/2004	8	November 11, 2003	Georgii Georgiev	Institute of Gene Biology, Moscow, Russia	"Some achievements of Russian molecular genetics between double helix and human genome"		
2003/2004	9	December 9, 2003	François Gros	Académie des Sciences, Paris, France	"From the double helix to genomics and beyond"		
2004/2005	10	October 7, 2004	Edward Trifonov	University of Haifa, Israel	"The nature and organisation of genomes, their sequence structure and evolution"		
2004/2005	11	October 21, 2004	Jack W. Szostak	Howard Hughes Medical Institute, Boston, USA	"The origin of life and the emergence of Darwinian evolution"	Nobel prize 2009	
2004/2005	12	November 18, 2004	Barry Dickson	Research Institute of Molecular Pathology, Vienna, Austria	"Wired for sex: How reproductive behaviours are programmed into a fly’s brain"		
2004/2005	13	March 17, 2005	Ernst Hafen	University of Zurich, Switzerland	"Genetic dissection of insulin signalling and growth in drosophila"		
2004/2005	14	April 20, 2005	Marc-André Sirard	Université Laval, Quebec, Canada	"Gene expression in bovine oocytes and embryos: Prospect and challenges"		
2004/2005	15	May 5, 2005	Sir Alec Jeffreys	University of Leicester, UK	"Genetic fingerprinting and beyond"		
2005/2006	16	October 3, 2005	Steven McKnight	University of Texas Southwestern Medical Center, Dallas, USA	"Schizophrenia, stem cells and sprouty signaling"		
2005/2006	17	November 10, 2005	Kim Nasmyth	Research Institute of Molecular Pathology, Vienna, Austria	"Molecules behind Mendel’s laws of heredity: How cohesin holds sister DNAs together during mitosis and meiosis"		
2005/2006	18	March 30, 2006	Richard Henderson	MRC Laboratory of Molecular Biology, Cambridge, UK		Nobel Prize 2017	
2005/2006	19	April 6, 2006	Jiri Bartek	Danish Cancer Society, Copenhagen, Denmark	"DNA damage response: Molecular mechanisms and relevance for cancer"		
2005/2006	20	April 20, 2006	Václav Pačes	Academy of Sciences of the Czech Republic, Prague	"On the origin of life on Earth"		
2005/2006	21	May 4, 2006	Susan Lindquist	MIT, Cambridge, USA / Whitehead Institute / HHMI	"Prion proteins and new paradigm epigenetics"		
2005/2006	22	May 18, 2006	Adrian Bird	Wellcome Trust Centre for Cell Biology, University of Edinburgh, UK	"Proteins that read DNA methylation signal"	Nobel Prize 2012	
2006/2007	23	October 12, 2006	John Gurdon	Wellcome/CRC Institute, University of Cambridge, UK	"Nuclear reprogramming as a route to cell replacement"	Nobel Prize 2012	
2006/2007	24	October 26, 2006	Ronald Plasterk	Netherlands Institute for Developmental Biology, Utrecht	"miRNAs for animal development"		
2006/2007	25	October 31, 2006	Elizabeth Blackburn	University of California, San Francisco, USA	"Responses of cells and organisms to altered telomere maintenance"	Nobel Prize 2009	
2006/2007	26	November 9, 2006	Rodney Rothstein	Columbia University, New York, USA	"Choreography of the DNA damage response in budding yeast"		
2006/2007	27	April 19, 2007	Wilhelm Ansorge	ETH Zurich, Switzerland	"Genomes, proteomes and single cell analysis"		
2006/2007	28	April 26, 2007	Richard Losick	Harvard University, Boston, USA	"Surprises in how microbes cope with uncertainty"		
2006/2007	29	May 10, 2007	Jan Ellenberg	EMBO, Heidelberg, Germany	"Imaging how living cells divide: From single proteins to genome wide screening"		
2007/2008	30	October 2, 2007	Titia de Lange	Rockefeller University, New York, USA	"How telomeres deal with the DNA damage response"		
2007/2008	31	November 8, 2007	Walter Jakob Gehring	University of Basel, Switzerland	"The master control gene of eye development and the evolution of light reception"		
2007/2008	32	November 29, 2007	Svante Pääbo	Max Planck Institute for Evolutionary Anthropology, Leipzig, Germany	"Of humans, neanderthals and apes"	Nobel prize 2022	
2007/2008	33	March 6, 2008	Elliot Meyerowitz	California Institute of Technology, Pasadena, USA	"Plant stem cells: Live imaging and computational models of the Arabidopsis shoot apical meristem"		
2007/2008	34	April 10, 2008	Stephen Craig West	Cancer Research UK, Clare Hall Laboratories, UK	"DNA strand-break repair and relationship to human disease"		
2007/2008	35	April 17, 2008	Richard M. Durbin	Wellcome Trust Sanger Institute, Cambridge, UK	"Sequencing hundreds of human genomes"		
2007/2008	36	May 5, 2008	Sir Paul Nurse	Rockefeller University, New York, USA	"The great ideas of biology"	Nobel Prize 2001	
2008/2009	37	October 9, 2008	Jan-Michael Peters	Research Institute of Molecular Pathology, Vienna, Austria	"How cohesin controls sister chromatid cohesion and transcription"		
2008/2009	38	November 20, 2008	Andrea Musacchio	FIRC Institute of Molecular Oncology Foundation / European Institute of Oncology, Milan, Italy	"Molecular bases of chromosome segregation"		
2008/2009	39	March 29, 2009	Jonas Frisén	Karolinska Institutet, Stockholm, Sweden	"New neurons in old brains"		
2008/2009	40	May 7, 2009	Sir Venkatraman Ramakrishnan	MRC Laboratory of Molecular Biology, Cambridge, UK	"What structures of the ribosome have revealed about its central role in translating genetic information"	Nobel Prize 2009	
2008/2009	41	May 14, 2009	Frances Ashcroft	University of Oxford, UK	"Neonatal diabetes: From ion channel to disease"		
2008/2009	42	May 21, 2009	Walter Keller	University of Basel, Switzerland	"3´end processing of messenger RNA precursors and RNA quality control"		
2009/2010	43	October 15, 2009	Meinrad Busslinger	Research Institute of Molecular Pathology, Vienna, Austria	"Lineage commitment and developmental plasticity of lymphocytes"		
2009/2010	44	October 22, 2009	Jason Chin	The Medical Research Council Laboratory of Molecular Biology, Cambridge, UK	"New genetic codes"		
2009/2010	45	November 23, 2009	James E. Haber	Brandeis University, Waltham, USA	"Multiple mechanisms to repair a broken chromosome"		
2009/2010	46	April 29, 2010	Azim Surani	Gurdon Institute, Cambridge, UK	"Germ cell specification in mice"		
2009/2010	47	May 13, 2010	Kai Simons	Max-Planck Institute of Molecular Cell Biology and Genetics, Dresden, Germany	"Cell membrane organisation and lipid rafts"		
2009/2010	48	May 27, 2010	Ueli Schibler	University of Geneva, Switzerland	"Circadian gene expression in mammals: How does the brain talk to the body?"		
2010/2011	49	October 21, 2010	Michael N. Hall	University of Basel, Switzerland	"TOR signaling in growth and metabolism"		
2010/2011	50	November 4, 2010	Iain Campbell	University of Oxford, UK	"Cell migration and protein-protein interactions"		
2010/2011	51	April 7, 2011	Linda Partridge	University College London, UK	"The new biology of ageing"		
2010/2011	52	April 14, 2011	David John Sherratt	University of Oxford, UK	"A passion for DNA"		
2010/2011	53	May 5, 2011	Steven Henikoff	Fred Hutchinson Cancer Research Center, Seattle, USA	"Histone variant dynamics and epigenetics"		
2010/2011	54	May 12, 2011	Hans Clevers	Netherlands Institute of Developmental Biology, Utrecht, Netherlands	"Wnt signaling, Lgr5 stem cells and cancer"		
2010/2011	55	May 26, 2011	Jeffery Errington	Newcastle University, UK	"L-form bacteria and the origins of life"		
2011/2012	56	October 6, 2011	John Diffley	Cancer Research UK, London, UK	"How Mendel's genes are copied"		
2011/2012	57	October 13, 2011	Timothy John Mitchison	Harvard Medical School, Boston, USA	"How does a large cell find its center?"		
2011/2012	58	November 10, 2011	Jürgen Knoblich	Institute of Molecular Biotechnology (IMBA), Vienna, Austria	"Proliferation control and tumorigenesis in stem cell lineages of the nervous system: Lessons from Drosophila and mouse genetics"		
2011/2012	59	March 8, 2012	Angelika Amon	MIT, Cambridge, USA	"Causes and consequences of aneuploidy"		
2011/2012	60	March 22, 2012	Anthony A. Hyman	Max Planck Institute of Molecular Cell Biology and Genetics, Dresden, Germany	"Cytoplasmic organization through phase transitions"		
2011/2012	61	April 19, 2012	Roland Kanaar	Erasmus Medical Center, Rotterdam, Netherlands	"How DNA recombination maintains genome integrity"		
2011/2012	62	May 10, 2012	Óscar Fernández-Capetillo	Spanish National Cancer Research Centre (CNIO), Madrid, Spain	"Exploring the role of replicative stress in cancer and ageing"		
2011/2012	63	May 24, 2012	Douglas E. Koshland	University of California, Berkeley, USA	"Preventing chromosomes from going rogue"		
10th anniversary	64	October 8, 2012	Gary Ruvkun	Simches Research Center, Boston, USA	"An animal surveillance pathway for microbial inhibition of conserved cellular components and induction of defense responses"	Nobel Prize 2024	
10th anniversary	65	October 8, 2012	Josef Jiricny	University of Zurich, Switzerland	"FAN 1, a novel enzyme involved in the processing of cisplatin adducts in DNA"		
10th anniversary	66	October 8, 2012	Jan Hoeijmakers	Erasmus Medical Center, Rotterdam, Netherlands	"DNA, the key molecule in cancer and ageing"		
10th anniversary	67	October 8, 2012	Jiri Lukas	Danish Cancer Society, Copenhagen, Denmark	"Spatial and temporal organization of genome maintenance"		
10th anniversary	68	October 9, 2012	Günter Blobel	Rockefeller University, New York, USA	"Molecular design of nature´s largest and most versatile channel anchored in the center of the nuclear pore"	Nobel Prize 1999	
10th anniversary	69	October 9, 2012	Julius Lukes	Biology Centre, Academy of Sciences of the Czech Republic Ceske Budejovice	"RNA editing in trypanosomatid protists"		
10th anniversary	70	October 9, 2012	Jiri Friml	Flanders Institute for Biotechnology, Ghent, Belgium	"How cells make a plant: Role for directional auxin transport"		
2012/2013	71	October 25, 2012	Nancy Kleckner	Harvard University, Cambridge, USA	"Meiotic recombination: The exception to, and the executor of, Mendel's laws"		
2012/2013	72	March 14, 2013	Brenda S. Schulman	St. Jude Children's Research Hospital, Memphis, USA	"Twists and turns in ubiquitin conjugation cascades"		
2012/2013	73	April 11, 2013	Tom Rapoport	Harvard Medical School, Boston, USA	"How the ER gets into shape"		
2012/2013	74	April 18, 2013	Torben Heick Jensen	Aarhus University, Denmark	"Making and breaking RNA in human nuclei"		
2012/2013	75	May 2, 2013	Simon Boulton	Cancer Research UK, South Mimms, UK	"Genome stability and the control of recombination"		
2012/2013	76	May 9, 2013	Peter Walter	HHMI / University of California, San Francisco, USA	"The unfolded protein response in health and disease"		
2012/2013	77	May 16, 2013	Stanislas Leibler	Rockefeller University, New York, USA	"Following in Mendel's footsteps: Statistical analysis of microbial behavioral phenotypes"		
2013/2014	78	October 17, 2013	Peter Baumann	Stowers Institute for Medical Research, Kansas City, USA	"Biogenesis and regulation of telomerase"		
2013/2014	79	October 24, 2013	Carlos Bustamante	University of California, Berkeley, USA	"Grabbing the cat by the tail: How a viral molecular motor packages DNA"		
2013/2014	80	November 21, 2013	Kay Hofmann	University of Cologne, Germany	"A common evolutionary basis for cell death pathways in animals, plants and fungi"		
2013/2014	81	May 22, 2014	Joan Massagué Solé	Memorial Sloan Kettering Cancer Center, New York, USA	"Origins of metastatic traits"		
2014/2015	82	October 30, 2014	Lorraine S. Symington	Columbia University Medical Center, New York, USA	"Mechanisms of homologous recombination"		
2014/2015	83	March 5, 2015	Herbert Waldmann	Max Planck Institute of Molecular Physiology, Dortmund, Germany	"Biology oriented synthesis"		
2014/2015	84	March 19, 2015	Kurt Wüthrich	ETH Zurich, Switzerland	"The colorful postgenomic world of proteins"	Nobel Prize 2002	
2014/2015	85	April 2, 2015	Xiaoliang Sunney Xie	Harvard University, Cambridge, USA	"Life at the single molecule level: Single cell genomics"		
2014/2015	86	April 9, 2015	Michael Rosbash	Brandeis University, Waltham, USA	"Biological time travels: Old and new circadian rhythm tales"	Nobel Prize 2017	
2014/2015	87	May 21, 2015	Jules A. Hoffmann	University of Strasbourg, France	"Innate immunity: From flies to humans"	Nobel Prize 2011	
2014/2015	88	May 28, 2015	Maria Jasin	Memorial Sloan Kettering Cancer Center, New York, USA	"Protecting the genome by homologous recombination"		
2015/2016	89	October 1, 2015	Masaru Okabe	Osaka University, Japan	"The first “Green mice” and the mechanism of mammalian fertilization revised by gene-manipulated animals"		
2015/2016	90	October 22, 2015	Aaron Ciechanover	Technion - Israel Institute of Technology, Haifa, Israel	"The ubiquitin proteolytic system: From basic mechanisms thru human diseases and on to drug targeting"	Nobel Prize 2004	
2015/2016	91	November 12, 2015	Michael G. Rosenfeld	HHMI / University of California, San Diego, USA / University of Rochester, USA	"Mendel's messengers: Enhancers and transcriptional programs"		
2015/2016	92	March 3, 2016	Michael G. Rossmann	Purdue University, West Lafayette, USA	"A personal history of structural virology"		
2015/2016	93	April 7, 2016	Steve Jackson	Gurdon Institute, University of Cambridge, UK	"Harnessing genetic principals to treat human disease"		
2015/2016	94	May 5, 2016	Joan A. Steitz	HHMI / Yale University, New Haven, USA	"Viral and cellular noncoding RNAs: Insight into evolution"		
2015/2016	95	May 19, 2016	Stephen J. Benkovic	Pennsylvania State University, USA	"On de novo purine biosynthesis: The purinosome"		
2016/2017	96	September 22, 2016	Wolfgang Baumeister	Department of Molecular Structural Biology, Max Planck Institute of Biochemistry, Martinsried, Germany	"The Molecular Machinery of Intracellular Protein Degradation: Structural Studies ex situ and in situ"		
2016/2017	97	November 10, 2016	Austin Smith	Department of Biochemistry, University of Cambridge / Wellcome–MRC Cambridge Stem Cell Institute, UK	"Design Principles of Pluripotency"		
2016/2017	98	March 2, 2017	Ada Yonath	Department of Structural Biology, Weizmann Institute of Science, Rehovot, Israel	"The Genetic Apparatus, from Mendel to Critical Issues in Contemporary Medicine"	Nobel Prize 2009	
2016/2017	99	March 16, 2017	Peter Donnelly	Nuffield Department of Medicine, University of Oxford / Wellcome Centre for Human Genetics, UK	"Meiosis, Recombination and the Origin of a Species"		
2016/2017	100	March 23, 2017	Friedhelm Hildebrandt	Harvard Medical School / Boston Children's Hospital / Howard Hughes Medical Institute, USA	"Chronic Kidney Disease: The Mendelian Surprise"		
2016/2017	101	April 20, 2017	David Tollervey	Wellcome Trust Centre for Cell Biology, University of Edinburgh, UK	"Lighting up RNA Interactions in Living Cells"		
2016/2017	102	May 18, 2017	Paul Modrich	Department of Biochemistry, Duke University Medical Center / Howard Hughes Medical Institute, Durham, USA	"Mechanisms in DNA Mismatch Repair"	Nobel Prize 2015	
2017/2018	103	October 12, 2017	Erich Nigg	University of Basel, Switzerland	"Cell Cycle Control of Chromosome Segregation: Focus on Kinetochores and Centrosomes"		
2017/2018	104	October 19, 2017	Shizuo Akira	Osaka University, Japan	"Toward Understanding the Mechanism of Fibrosis"		
2017/2018	105	December 14, 2017	Gregory Hannon	Cancer Research UK Cambridge Institute, University of Cambridge, UK	"A Small RNA-based Innate Immune System Guards the Integrity of Germ Cell Genomes"		
2017/2018	106	March 8, 2018	Elena Conti	Max-Planck-Institut für Biochemie, Germany	"The RNA Exosome-Ribosome Connection: Coupling Synthesis to Degradation"		
2017/2018	107	April 19, 2018	Tom Misteli	National Cancer Institute, NIH, Bethesda, USA	"The Cell Biology of the Genome"		
2017/2018	108	May 3, 2018	Mark Ptashne	Memorial Sloan Kettering Cancer Center, New York, USA	"The Logic Of Gene Regulation"		
2017/2018	109	May 17, 2018	Steven Benner	Foundation for Applied Molecular Evolution, Alachua, USA	"Artificial Genetics and Evolution in the New Millennium"		
2018/2019	110	October 4, 2018	Eric F. Wieschaus	Howard Hughes Medical Institute / Department of Molecular Biology, Princeton University, USA	"Genes and the Mechanics of Cell Shape"	Nobel Prize 1995	
2018/2019	111	October 11, 2018	Rudolf Jaenisch	Whitehead Institute for Biomedical Research, MIT, Cambridge, USA	"Epigenetic Regulation in Development, Aging and Disease States"		
2018/2019	112	October 18, 2018	Patrick Sung	Department of Molecular Biophysics and Biochemistry, Yale University, USA	"Mechanism of Homology-directed Chromosome Damage Repair in Eukaryotes"		
2018/2019	113	March 14, 2019	Richard J. Davidson	Center for Healthy Minds, University of Wisconsin–Madison, USA	"Well-being Is a Skill: Perspectives From Affective and Contemplative Neuroscience"		
2018/2019	114	March 21, 2019	Emmanuelle Charpentier	Max Planck Institute for Infection Biology, Berlin, Germany	"CRISPR-Cas9: a Bacterial Immune System Repurposed as a Transformative Genome Engineering Technology"	Nobel Prize 2020	
2018/2019	115	May 2, 2019	Manolis Kellis	Computer Science & Artificial Intelligence Lab and the Broad Institute of MIT and Harvard, USA	"From Genomics To Therapeutics: Uncovering And Manipulating The Genetic Circuitry of Human Disease"		
2018/2019	116	May 16, 2019	Fraser Stoddart	Department of Chemistry, Northwestern University, Evanston, USA	"The Rise and Promise of Artificial Molecular Machines Based on the Mechanical Bond"	Nobel Prize 2016	
2018/2019	117	May 23, 2019	Andrew G. Myers	Department of Chemistry and Chemical Biology, Harvard University, Cambridge, USA	"Progress Toward the Discovery of New Antibiotics with Efficacy Against Multi-drug Resistant Bacterial Pathogens"		
2018/2019	118	May 30, 2019	Roel Nusse	Howard Hughes Medical Institute, Department of Developmental Biology, Stanford University, School of Medicine, Stanford, USA	"Wnt Signaling and the Generation of New Cells in the Liver"		
2019/2020	119	October 3, 2019	Stefan Knapp	SGC Frankfurt, Germany	"Challenges of selective targeting of protein kinases in cellular environments"		
2019/2020	120	November 7, 2019	Andrés Aguilera	Department of Molecular Biology, University of Sevilla, Spain	"RNA-mediated chromatin regulation"		
2019/2020	121	November 14, 2019	Caroline Dean	John Innes Centre Norwich, UK	"Antisense-mediated chromatin regulation"		
2019/2020	122	November 21, 2019	Gerald P. Schatten	McGowan Institute for Regenerative Medicine, University of Pittsburgh Medical Center, USA	"Would Gregor Mendel be alarmed that designer babies walk among us?"		
2019/2020	123	March 5, 2020	Adrian Krainer	Cold Spring Harbor Laboratory, Watson School of Biological Sciences, USA	"From Base Pairs to Bedside: Antisense Therapeutics for Targeted Modulation of Splicing or NMD"		
2020-2022	124	September 16, 2021	Andrew deMello	ETH Zurich, Switzerland	"Rise of the Micromachines: Biology on the Small Scale"		
2020-2022	125	November 18, 2021	Marek Mlodzik	Icahn School of Medicine at Mount Sinai, USA	"Wnt/Frizzled Planar Cell Polarity signaling in development and disease"		
2020-2022	126	March 17, 2022	Ben Feringa	University of Groningen, Netherlands	"The Art of Building Small"	Nobel Prize 2016	
2022/2023	127	October 13, 2022	Klaus Rajewsky	Max Delbrück Center for Molecular Medicine, Berlin, Germany	Role of the Antigen Receptor in Normal and Malignant B Cell Development		
2022/2023	128	October 20, 2022	Matthias Hentze	European Molecular Biology Laboratory (EMBL), Heidelberg, Germany	Exploring the Underground of the RBP World: Riboregulation		
2022/2023	129	November 3, 2022	Kimoon Kim	Pohang University of Science and Technology, South Korea)	Supramolecular Latch: a New Chemical Tool for Chemistry, Biology and Materials Science		
2022/2023	130	March 2, 2023	Walter Salzburger	University of Basel, Switzerland	The non-gradual nature of explosive diversification in African cichlid fishes		
2022/2023	131	March 23, 2023	Dirk Inzé	VIB-UGent Center for Plant Systems Biology, Ghent University, Belgium	Engineering complex agronomic traits in crops		
2022/2023	132	May 4, 2023	Brian K. Kobilka	Stanford University School of Medicine, Stanford, CA, USA	Structural insights into G protein coupled receptor activation	Nobel Prize 2012	
2022/2023	133	May 18, 2023	John T. Lis	Cornell University, USA	Architecture and mechanistic interplay of promoters and enhancers in controlling gene expression		
2023/2024	134	October 12, 2023	Susumu Tonegawa	MIT, Cambridge, Massachusetts, USA	Molecular Genetics of the Immune and Nervous Systems--Antibody Diversity and Memory Engrams	Nobel Prize 1987	
2023/2024	135	October 26, 2023	Amita Sehgal	Perelman School of Medicine, University of Pennsylvania, Philadelphia, USA	Biology of Bedtime: Understanding the basis of sleep		
2023/2024	136	March 21, 2024	Sarah A. Tishkoff	University of Pennsylvania, Philadelphia, USA	Genomic Evolution and Adaptation in Africa		
2023/2024	137	April 11, 2024	Johannes C. Walter	Harvard Medical School, Massachusetts, USA	Mechanisms of Vertebrate DNA Replication and Repair		
2023/2024	138	April 18, 2024	Randy W. Schekman	Berkeley University of California, USA	Intercellular transfer of proteins and RNA		
2023/2024	139	April 25, 2024	Thomas R. Cech	University of Colorado at Boulder, USA	That Magical Strand, RNA	Nobel Prize 1989	
2023/2024	140	April 16, 2024	Patrick Cramer	Max Planck Institute for Multidisciplinary Sciences, Germany	Transcription of the genome: molecular mechanism and cellular regulation		
2023/2024	141	April 23, 2024	Narry Kim	Institute for Basic Science and Seoul National University, Korea	The Making of MicroRNA		
2024/2025	142	October 10, 2024	Virginijus Šikšnys	Vilnius University, Lithuania	CRISPR-Cas: From Bacterial Immunity Towards Genome Editing and Beyond		
2024/2025	143	October 17, 2024	Albert Heck	Utrecht University, Netherlands	What Do We Know About (Your) Antibodies?		
2024/2025	144	March 13, 2025	Melina Schuh	Max Planck Institute for Multidisciplinary Sciences, Germany	Illuminating the Beginning of Life		
2024/2025	145	April 24, 2025	Zhijian ‘‘James’’ Chen	University of Texas Southwestern Medical Center, USA	The Enemy Within - How Does the Immune System Sense DNA as a Danger Signal?		
2024/2025	146	May 22, 2025	Karen Adelman	Harvard Medical School, Massachusetts, USA	Controlling Transcription of Coding and Non-Coding RNAs		
2025/2026	147	October 9, 2025	Juli Feigon	University of California, Los Angeles, USA	Structural Biology of Telomerase and Interactions at Telomeres		
2025/2026	148	October 23, 2025	Michael Snyder	Stanford Medicine, California, USA	Disrupting Healthcare Using Deep Data and Remote Monitoring		
2025/2026	149	March 19, 2026	Jakub Tolar	University of Minnesota, USA	The Next Generation of Evidence-Based Therapy for Epidermolysis Bullosa		
2025/2026	150	May 14, 2026	Ivan Đikić	Goethe University, Medical Faculty, Germany	Ubiquitination and Autophagy – Quality Control of Life Processes		
