= Czech Brain Ageing Study =

Study on aging and dementia in the Czech Republic

Czech Brain Ageing Study (CBAS) is a longitudinal, observational study on aging and dementia from two large centers in the Czech Republic combining clinical care and clinical research.

The pilot project leading to the pilot data for CBAS was established in 2005 as a longitudinal follow-up of subjects at risk of Alzheimer disease dementia (AD). A major step forward occurred in 2011 after receiving a substantial funding from the European Regional Development Fund and the Czech Ministry of Health. This funding enabled to establish the International Clinical Research Center (FNUSA-ICRC) in Brno and also enabled to synchronize the efforts in clinical and translational research between the ICRC and the Cognitive Center at Department of Neurology of the Motol University Hospital in Prague. CBAS now recruits a large numbers of participants across the two sites and is the only longitudinal study of its kind in the Czech Republic. It is also about to become the largest study to study risk factors for AD in Central and Eastern Europe.

== Study design ==
Participants undergo annual follow-up with clinical evaluations, multimodality brain MRI, comprehensive standardized neuropsychological testing including memory tests aimed to detect early cognitive decline and laboratory examination. The APOE, TOMM40 and BDNF genotyping is done at baseline. In a subset of participants, CSF and/or amyloid PET is performed. The majority of participants also undergo a unique translational, experimental neuropsychological protocol that has been inspired by animal research. This protocol consists of various tasks aiming to detect early cognitive and clinical impairment in AD spectrum.

The strong translational aspect of this approach, which includes the use of the human analogue of the Morris Water Maze, is aimed at the identification of individuals at preclinical and prodromal stage of AD. Biological sample bank (DNA, CSF and plasma) matched with the CBAS clinical data is also a part of CBAS.

From a biological point of view, one aim of CBAS is to biochemically characterize the subjects affected by AD dementia and related memory disorders. The search for new biomarkers has expanded in the last years in the attempt to characterize the disease stage and/or predict the disease course. The currently accepted view is that single measurement of biomarkers in plasma, serum or cerebrospinal fluid has been shown to be not sufficient per se and must be corroborated with combined biomarker measurements. Therefore, there is a focus on expanding the number of measurable biomarkers by including proteins related to the neuronal activity in the CNS, such as neurotrophic factors, enzymes regulating protein expression, and proteins related to neuronal/synaptic function, such as neurofilament light protein, neurogranin and contactin-2.

== International collaboration ==
The CBAS team has multiple international collaborations including Massachusetts General Hospital, Harvard University (Boston), the Mayo Clinic (Rochester, MN) and University of South Florida (Tampa, USA), as well as University of Queensland (Brisbane, Australia), Drum Tower Hospital and Nanjing University (Nanjing, China), University of Bonn, University of East Anglia (UK) and Karolinska Institutet (Stockholm, Sweden).

== Institutions participating in CBAS ==
- Cognitive center, Department of Neurology, 2nd Medical Faculty, Charles University and Motol University hospital in Prague

The Motol hospital is the largest hospital in the Czech Republic and Central Europe. The team affiliated with the hospital and Charles University in Prague specializes in the clinical research in the field of cognitive and behavioral neurology, including neuroepidemiology of neurodegenerative disorders leading to various dementia syndromes. The Cognitive Center has been a member of the European Alzheimer Disease Consortium (EADC) since 2017, and we are currently joining join the European Medical Information Framework (EMIF) and the Global Alzheimer’s Association Interactive Network (GAAIN) networks.

- International Clinical Research Center at the St. Anne’s University Hospital in Brno (FNUSA-ICRC)

ICRC at the St. Anne’s University Hospital in Brno is a major healthcare center in Moravia region of the Czech Republic.

== See also ==
- Brain–computer interface
- Neurology
