= ICRC (disambiguation) =

The ICRC is the International Committee of the Red Cross.

ICRC may also refer to:

- Interface Cyclic Redundancy Check
- International Clinical Research Center in Brno, Czech Republic
- International Conference of Reformed Churches
- International Cosmic Ray Conference
- International Classic Record Collector, a magazine founded in 1995
