= Davor Solter =

Yugoslavian-born developmental biologist

Davor Solter (born March 22, 1941) is a Croatian-born developmental biologist, particularly known for his pioneering work on mammalian genomic imprinting. He is Emeritus Member and Director, Max Planck Institute of Immunobiology and Epigenetics; Visiting International Professor, Siriraj Center for Excellence in Stem Cell Research, Mahidol University, Thailand; and Visiting Professor, University of Zagreb Medical School.

== Education and career ==
Solter was born in Zagreb, Yugoslavia, in 1941. His M.D. (1965) and Ph.D. (1971) degrees are from the University of Zagreb, where he worked in the Departments of Anatomy and Biology of the School of Medicine (1963–73). He then moved to the United States, where he worked at the Wistar Institute, Philadelphia, PA, rising to full professor in 1981. He joined the University of Pennsylvania in 1982, becoming the Wistar Professor of Biology in 1984. He directed the Max Planck Institute of Immunobiology and Epigenetics in Freiburg, Germany, from 1991 to 2006. In 2008 he moved to Singapore, where worked at the National University of Singapore (in association with Duke University; 2008–13) and also served as research director of the Institute of Medical Biology, A*STAR. In 2014 he moved to Thailand, where as of 2018 he holds a visiting professorship at Mahidol University, Bangkok.

== Awards ==
In 1998 he received the March of Dimes Prize in Developmental Biology "For pioneering the concept of gene imprinting". He won the Rosenstiel Award in 2006, with Surani and Mary Lyon, for "pioneering work on epigenetic gene regulation in mammalian embryos". In 2018, he was a recipient of the Canada Gairdner International Award, with Azim Surani, "For the discovery of mammalian genomic imprinting that causes parent-of-origin specific gene expression and its consequences for development and disease." In 2026 he was awarded the Paul Ehrlich and Ludwig Darmstaedter Prize for the discovery of the genomic imprinting, together with Azim Surani.

He is an elected or honorary member of the Academia Europaea (1992), European Molecular Biology Organization (1994), American Academy of Arts and Sciences (1994) and the Japanese Biochemical Society (1995).

== Key papers ==
- McGrath, James; Solter, Davor (1984). "Completion of mouse embryogenesis requires both the maternal and paternal genomes". Cell. 37 (1): 179–183. Bibcode:1984Cell...37..179M. doi:10.1016/0092-8674(84)90313-1. PMID 6722870.
