= Amanda Fisher =

British cell biologist

Professor Dame Amanda Fisher DBE FRS FMedSci
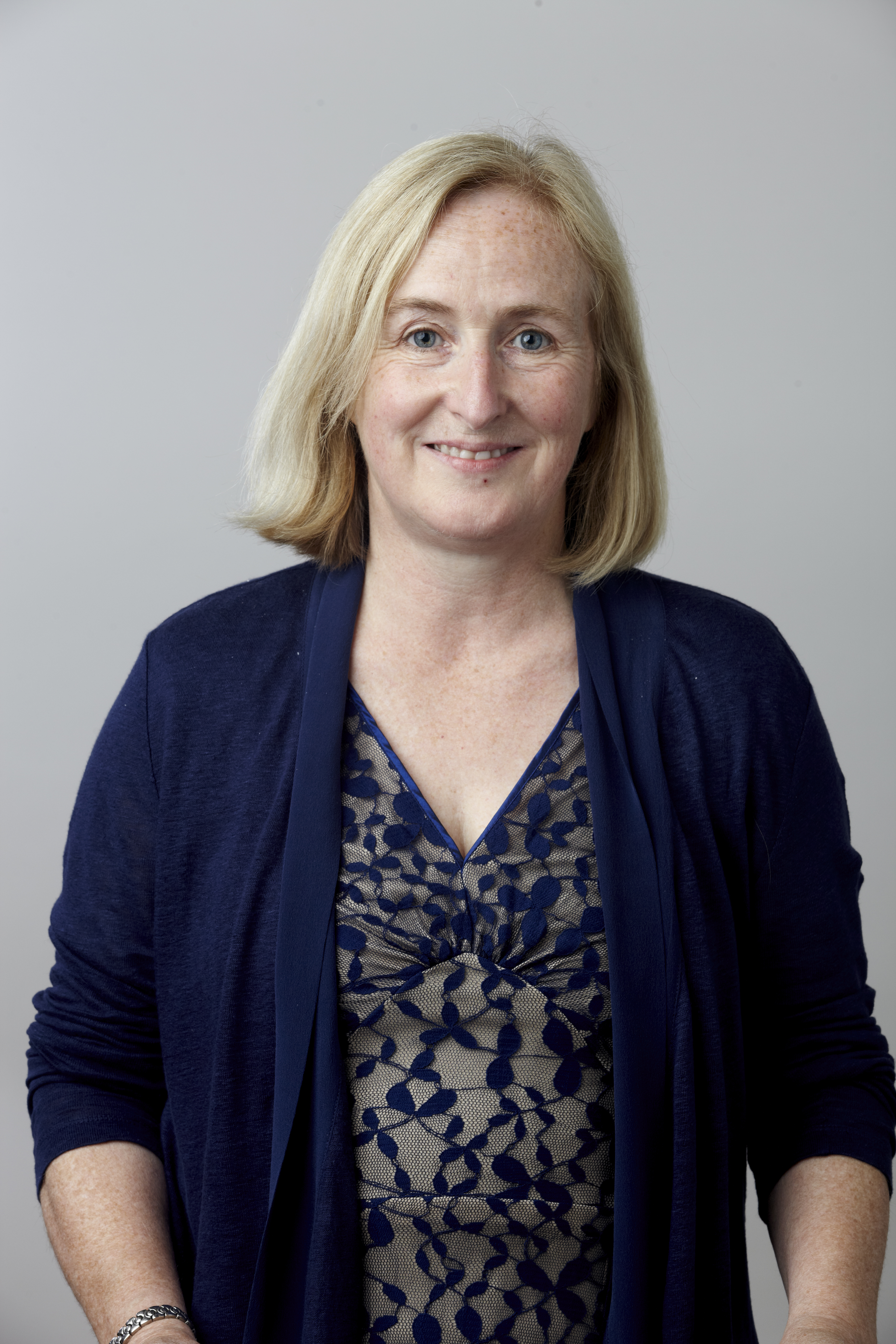
- Fisher in 2016
- Born: Amanda Gay Fisher
- Education: University of Birmingham
- Awards: EMBO Member (2001); EMBO Gold Medal (2002)
- Scientific career
- Workplaces: Imperial College London; London Institute of Medical Sciences
- Thesis: Surface antigens expressed during myelopoiesis (1984)
- Notable students: Kat Arney (postdoc)
- Website: imperial.ac.uk/people/amanda.fisher

Dame Amanda Gay Fisher is a British cell biologist, Whitley Professor of Biochemistry at the University of Oxford and former Director of the Medical Research Council (MRC) London Institute of Medical Sciences at the Hammersmith Hospital campus of Imperial College London, where she was also Head of Department at the Institute of Clinical Sciences. She has made contributions to multiple areas of cell biology, including determining the function of several genes in HIV and describing the importance of a gene's location within the cell nucleus.

As a postdoctoral researcher, she produced the first functional copies of HIV, providing researchers with access to enough biologically active material to study the function of the virus's genes. She later became interested in epigenetics and nuclear reprogramming, particularly in white blood cells known as lymphocytes and embryonic stem cells. As of 2016 her research focuses on how gene expression patterns are inherited when cells divide, using lymphocytes as a model system.

== Education ==
Fisher was educated at the University of Birmingham where she was awarded a PhD in 1984 for research into antigens expressed during myelopoiesis. During her PhD she was awarded a Lady Tata Memorial Fellowship in 1983 to study gene regulation in the laboratory of Robert Gallo at the National Institutes of Health (NIH) in the USA.

== Research and career ==
Fisher's research has used lymphocytes as a model to analyse how gene expression patterns are transmitted through cell division. Fisher also explored the molecular basis of lineage choice. She studies the transcriptional and epigenetic mechanisms that underlie cellular differentiation and experimental reprogramming.

Her research activities also include pluripotency and reprogramming, polycomb repressor complexes in stem cells, cohesion function in gene expression and genome organisation with Ikaros family transcription factors (TFs). She uses current technologies to address events involved in maintaining embryonic stem (ES) cell pluripotency versus differentiation towards mesoderm, endoderm and ectoderm, as well as the mechanisms of T cell and B cell lineage choice and differentiation.

=== HIV/AIDS ===
Fisher's discoveries in HIV were extensive and critical for future research of the virus's characteristics. She produced the first functional copies of HIV, allowing her and other scientists to access biologically active material for future research of the virus's genes. She determined the roles of several of the genes in HIV. These findings have been significant in studying and understanding different characteristics of HIV and Human T-lymphotropic virus (HTLV).

At the NIH, Fisher developed approaches that allowed the successful introduction of exogenous DNA onto human blood cells. Two methods, protoplast fusion and electroporation, proved successful and allowed Fisher to test whether molecular clones isolated from HIV-infected cultures could generate infectious retrovirus upon transfection.

Fisher showed in 1985 that molecular clones of HIV, contained within approximately 18kb of contiguous proviral DNA, were biologically active and generated cytopathic virus when introduced into primary human T-cells. This established that products of the viral genome itself, rather than a cofactor or contaminant, were capable of killing human T cells and were therefore potentially capable of mediating the immunosuppressive effect of HIV. It provided the basis for dissecting the molecular function of each of the viral genes and for developing DNA-based diagnostic tests for HIV infection.

Over the following four years, Fisher showed that the transactivator gene tat was essential for virus replication, that truncation of the 3' open reading frame (ORF) disrupts virus cytopathogenicity, and that sor (now called vif) is required for efficient cell to cell transmission of HIV virus. With clinical collaboration from the Walter Reed National Military Medical Center Fisher showed that patient antisera displayed type-specific neutralising properties and that multiple HIV isolates derived from a single patient were biologically diverse and contained replication-competent as well as replication-incompetent cytopathic variants.

=== Human T cell development ===
Fisher moved from the US to the UK in 1987 to study human T cell development. She established the first human thymus organ cultures in 1990, based on studies pioneered by Owen and Jenkinson in the mouse. This refinement allowed cell-fate to be mapped in vitro and provided a system in which potential factors that shape the human T cell repertoire could be experimentally tested. She spent a further 3 years training in mouse genetics, transgenic and knockout technologies at the Institut de génétique et de biologie moléculaire et cellulaire (IGBMC) Strasbourg, before being invited by the Medical Research Council to establish a research team with her partner Matthias Merkenschlager at what was then the Clinical Sciences Centre (CSC). Fisher joined the CSC in 1993, and subsequently became its director in 2008. At the CSC her work has focused on understanding gene regulation during cell commitment. In January 2017, the CSC was renamed the MRC London Institute of Medical Sciences (MRC LMS).

=== Epigenetics and chromatin ===
In 1997, Fisher's group published an important paper on the DNA-binding factor Ikaros, that at the time was presumed to be a transcriptional activator. Fisher's group showed that Ikaros proteins unexpectedly localised to percentric heterochromatin in cycling lymphocytes in association with transcriptionally silent genes. This provided some of the first evidence that where a gene is located inside the nucleus may be relevant for its expression. The development of three dimensional (3D) immuno-FISH techniques by Fisher's team, in which the protein structure and the nuclear architecture of a sample remains preserved, was critical for revealing the spatial distribution of chromosomes and the genes within the nucleus. In the last 15 years, analogous approaches have been widely used to interrogate the relationship between gene function and nuclear organisation. For example, studies showed that Ikaros- target genes in T and B cells were recruited to pericentric heterochromatin domains only when gene silencing was inherited by daughter cells. This study, together with others, established that the nuclear location, physical compaction and local chromatin environment of many genes was important for maintaining heritable silencing. Subsequent studies to characterise the differences between transient and heritable/permanent silencing revealed that several silent genes that were assumed to replicate late during synthesis phase (S-phase) of the cell cycle (based on Fluorescence in situ hybridisation (FISH) detection of doublet signals), actually replicated much earlier (based on quantitative increases in DNA content). This discovery in 2003, led Fisher and Merkenschlager to hypothesis that – rather than altering the time of DNA replication – heritable gene silencing could retard chromatid separation and resolution. From this viewpoint they began a series of studies that have subsequently shown the involvement of cohesin complexes in gene regulation and in 2002, Fisher was awarded the EMBO Gold Medal in recognition of her early work on HIV, and the role of nuclear organisation in gene regulation.

Since 2003, Fisher has been studying gene regulation in embryonic stem cells (ES), as a model for understanding pluripotency, lineage commitment and lineage restriction. In 2006, she showed that the promoters of many lineage-specifying genes in ES cells were simultaneously enriched for modified histones thought to mark either active genes (such as acetylation of H3K9, di- and tri-methylation of H3K4), or repressed domains ( such as tri-methylation of H3K27). This discovery ran contrary to the prevailing dogma of the time: that chromatin markers of actively transcribed and inactive domains were mutually exclusive. The study was published in 2006, contemporaneously with similar reports from several US-based groups. suggesting that important developmental regulator genes might be poised for transcription in ES cells, yet repressed by the activity of Polycomb Repressor Complexes (PRCs).

=== Awards and honours ===
Fisher was elected a member of the European Molecular Biology Organization (EMBO) in 2001 and awarded the EMBO Gold Medal in 2002 in recognition of her work on nuclear organisation and gene expression, as well as for her research on the molecular characterisation of the HIV/AIDS.

In 2014, she was elected a Fellow of the Royal Society. Her nomination reads:

Amanda Fisher is distinguished for her pioneering work on HIV pathogenesis, T lymphocyte development, embryonic stem cells and epigenetic gene regulation. She described the first active clones of HIV and discovered the functions of several HIV genes including tat, nef and vif. In T lymphocytes she showed that a gene's position within the nucleus is important for maintaining heritable gene silencing. In embryonic stem cells she showed that important developmental regulator genes can be "poised" for expression whilst being repressed by polycomb repressor complexes.

In 2003 she was elected a Fellow of the Academy of Medical Sciences (FMedSci) for excellence in her contributions to medicine and society. Fisher organises and participates in a range of public engagement projects and events, and in recognition of this work she received an 'Outstanding Women in Science Award for communication in Science, Engineering Technology (SET) award in March 2010. Fisher was awarded the Helmholtz Association of German Research Centres International Fellow award in 2015.

Fisher was appointed Dame Commander of the Order of the British Empire (DBE) in the 2017 New Year Honours for services to medical research and the public understanding of science.

In January 2023, Fisher was elected as the Whitley Chair and Fellow in Biochemistry at Trinity College, Oxford.
