= Kat Arney =

British science communicator

- Born: Katharine Luisa Arney; Italy
- Education: University of Cambridge (PhD)
- Known for: Science blogging Science podcasts
- Scientific career
- Fields: Cancer research
- Workplaces: Cancer Research UK; The Naked Scientists; Imperial College London
- Thesis: Epigenetic modification in the mouse zygote and regulation of imprinted genes (2002)
- Doctoral advisor: Azim Surani
- Other academic advisors: Amanda Fisher
- Website: katarney.wordpress.com

Katharine Luisa Arney is a British science communicator, broadcaster, author, and the founder and creative director of communications consultancy First Create the Media. She was a regular co-host of The Naked Scientists, a BBC Radio programme and podcast, and also hosted the BBC Radio 5 Live Science Show and the BBC Radio 4 series Did the Victorians Ruin the World She has written numerous articles and columns for Science, The Guardian, New Scientist the BBC and others.

== Education ==
Arney was educated at the University of Cambridge where she was awarded a PhD in 2002 for research into epigenetic modification in the mouse zygote and regulation of imprinted genes. Her PhD was supervised by Azim Surani and included research on Insulin-like growth factor 2 and the H19 gene. She went on to do postdoctoral research at Imperial College London working in the laboratory of Amanda Fisher.

== Career ==
Arney is a strong advocate for involvement of women in science, technology, engineering, and mathematics (STEM), but "hates pink" - she considers attempts to make science look more "girlie" to be patronising and unnecessary.

From 2004 to 2016 she was science communications manager for Cancer Research UK. One notable success in this role was the "#NoMakeupSelfie" hashtag as it trended in August 2014; this was noted by CRUK's social media team who used a photograph of Arney – one of the charity's main media spokespeople – to publicise the SMS number for donations. After more than 5 million views, the hashtag raised in excess of £8 million for Cancer Research UK.

Her first book, Herding Hemingway’s Cats, which was published in January 2016 by Bloomsbury Publishing, covers the state of knowledge of the human genome, the advances made since the 1950s and what remains unknown. It also addresses misconceptions about epigenetics and non-DNA inheritance.

In 2020 she published the book Rebel Cell: Cancer, Evolution, and the New Science of Life's Oldest Betrayal.

Her sister Helen Arney is a musician with whom she sometimes collaborates.
