= Emil Paleček =

Czech biochemist (1930–2018)

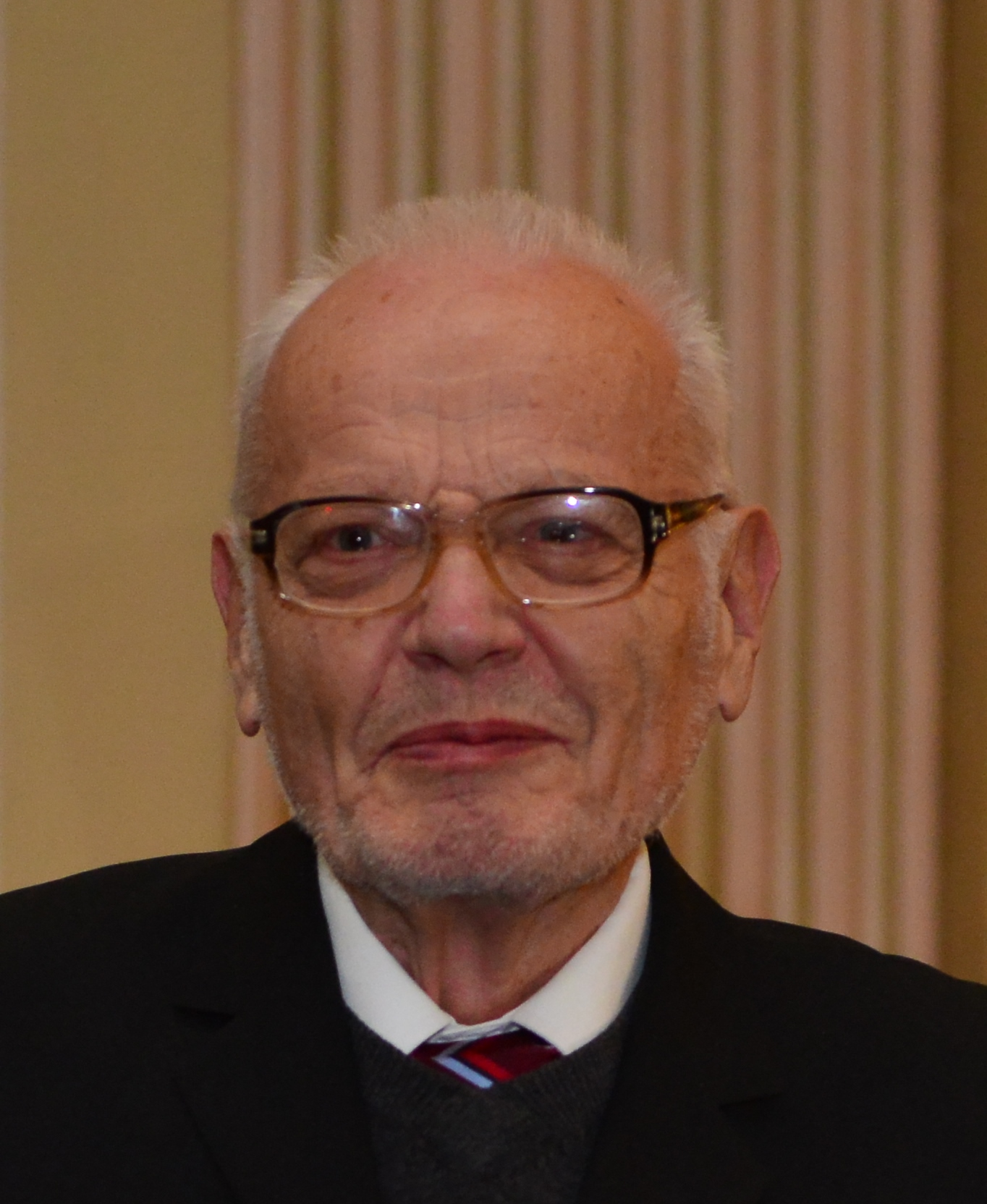
- Paleček in 2016
- Born: 3 October 1930; Czechoslovakia
- Died: 30 October 2018 (aged 88); Brno, Czech Republic
- Education: Masaryk University
- Known for: electrochemical research in nucleic acids
- Partner: Eva Palečková
- Children: Jan Paleček, Emil Michal Paleček, Pavel Paleček
- Scientific career
- Fields: Biochemistry; DNA

Emil Paleček (3 October 1930 – 30 October 2018) was a Czech biochemist, who researched how DNA can be used to diagnose genetic diseases. Paleček discovered that nucleic acids could be analysed by electrochemical research, contradicting previous assumptions from the 1950s that DNA molecules were too large to be affected by electrochemistry.

== Personal life ==
Paleček was brought up by his mother, as his father died in a Nazi concentration camp. Aged 13, he went to work as an apprentice at the Bank of Slavia.

== Career ==
Paleček had a specific interest in the fact that most proteins contain sugar, as he believed that analysis of this could lead to better diagnosis of health and illnesses. In particular, he believed that testing glycoproteins could detect early-stage cancer.

In 1959, Paleček received a PhD in biochemistry from Masaryk University in Brno, Czechoslovakia (now in the Czech Republic). During the 1960s, Paleček worked at the Biophysical Institute of the Academy of Sciences in Brno. His first work there was investigating DNA damage caused by radiation. Paleček later worked with the Masaryk Memorial Cancer Institute, part of Masaryk University.

In 1960, Paleček discovered that nucleic acids could be analysed through electrochemical research, which allowed him to explore how DNA can be used to diagnose genetic diseases. His discovery contradicted previous assumptions from the 1950s that DNA molecules were too large to be analysed by electrochemical research. It took the scientific world 30 years to understand the importance of his findings, although the method began to be commonly used in the 1990s. In the 1960s, Paleček spent a year doing research at Harvard University in the United States. Paleček was allowed to travel to the United States as he was not a member of the Communist Party of Czechoslovakia. In his last month at Harvard University, Paleček's experiments were demonstrated. They were later cited in many biophysics and molecular biology textbooks. During his life, Paleček authored over 300 scientific works, making him one of the most respected scientists in the Czech Republic.

In 1989, Paleček became a member of the Czechoslovak Academy of Sciences. From 1993 to 1997, he was a member of the Czech Academy of Sciences. In 1994, Paleček was one of the founding members of the Learned Society of the Czech Republic. In 2003, Paleček was the speaker for one of the Mendel Lectures. In 2009, the Emil Paleček award, was set up by the President of the Czech Academy of Sciences.

Paleček was still working on the Saturday before his death.

== Awards ==
In 1961, Paleček was awarded the Jaroslav Heyrovský award for best young scientist. In 2011, he received the Education Minister's award. In 2014, Paleček was awarded the Česká hlava (Czech Head) and the Silver Medal of the Senate President awards. In 2017, he was one of seven Czech scientists awarded the Cenu Neuron (Neuron Prize) for their contributions to science.

== Death ==
Paleček became ill after having a stroke whilst swimming. He died two days later on 30 October 2018. His death was announced by fellow scientist Eduard Kejnovsky, who worked as Paleček's public relations officer.
