= Mendel Museum of Masaryk University =

Mendel Museum
- Mendelovo muzeum
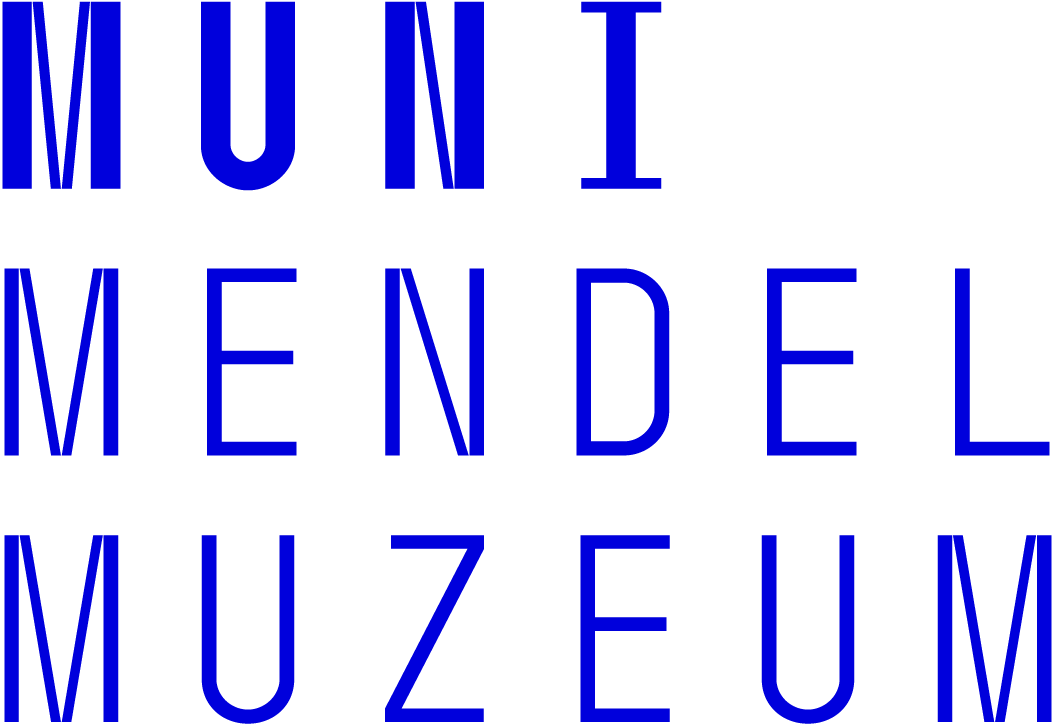

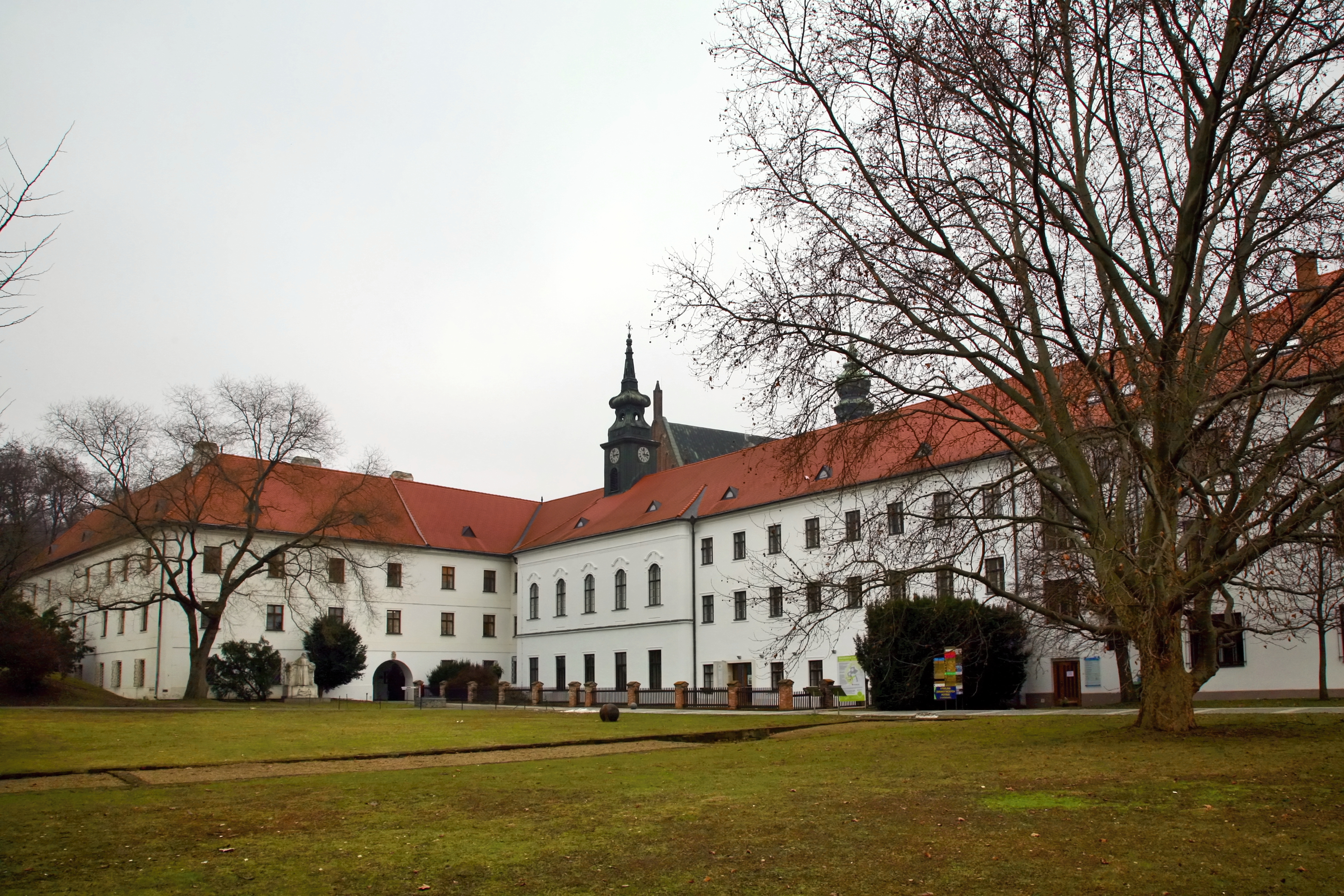
- Mendel Museum
- Interactive fullscreen map
- Established: 2002; 24 years ago
- Location: Mendlovo náměstí 1a, Brno, Czech Republic, 603 00
- Coordinates: 49°11′27.76″N 16°35′38.19″E
- Website: https://mendelmuseum.muni.cz/

Mendel Museum (Czech: Mendelovo muzeum) has been an institution of Masaryk University in Brno, Czech Republic, since 2007. The museum was established in 2002 with the international co-operation of a number of organizations. The principal role in the creation of the museum itself was played by the Austrian society VFG and affiliated scientists and patrons. The museum is located within the precincts of the Augustinian abbey in Old Brno, where the abbot and scientist Gregor Johann Mendel lived and worked.

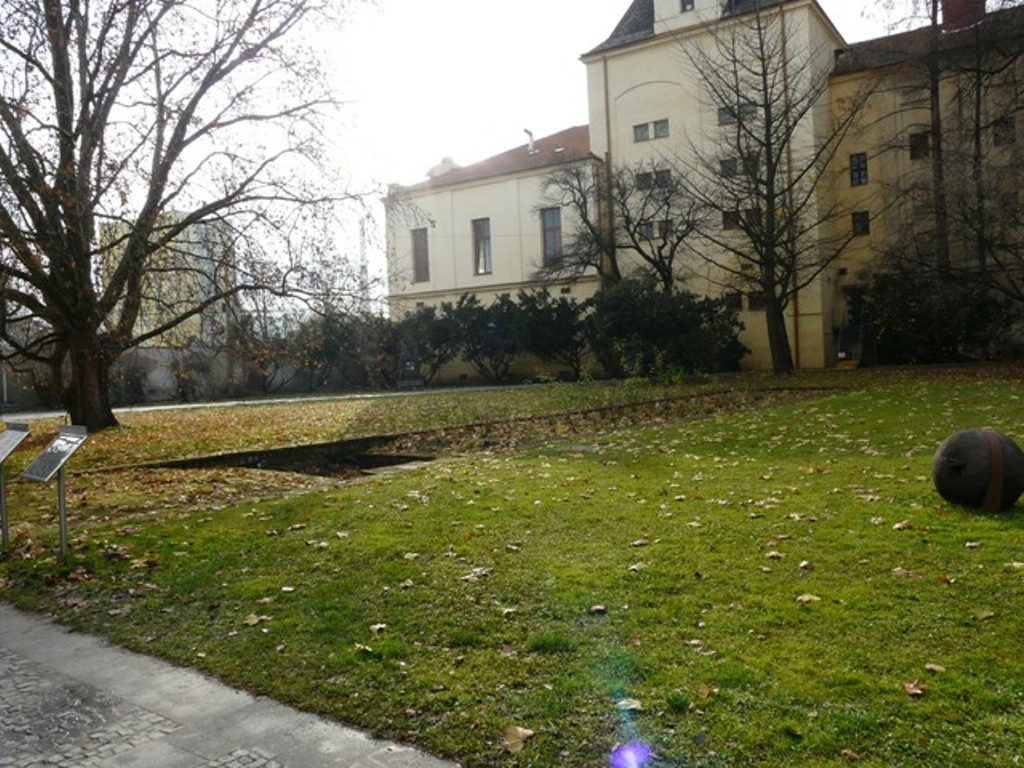
Foundations of Mendel's greenhouse

== About ==
It aims to promote the legacy of Augustinian abbot G. J. Mendel, who is known primarily for his studies conducted on plants, peas in particular. However, one should not fail to mention Mendel's other research in the field of meteorology, or breeding of bees. Abbot Mendel has stood for an immortal icon of modern biology owing to his own persistence, diligence, and analytical approach to the heredity of peas and other plants. Therefore, he is rightly called the father of genetics. The work of this genius was only fully appreciated after his death.

Therefore, one of the aims of the museum is to demonstrate Mendel's genius, and to raise awareness about the fields of study students, as well as applicants for studies at Masaryk University, can encounter. The interconnection of the practical requirements of a museum institution with several fields of study makes the Mendel Museum a significant place which links science with practise. It facilitates an encounter of academics with the wider public. There is also a place for the world of art within the museum's exhibition plans. The museum frequently stages short-term art exhibitions.

== See also ==
- Mendel Lectures
- Mendelian error
