= Pavel Křížkovský =

Czech composer (1820–1885)

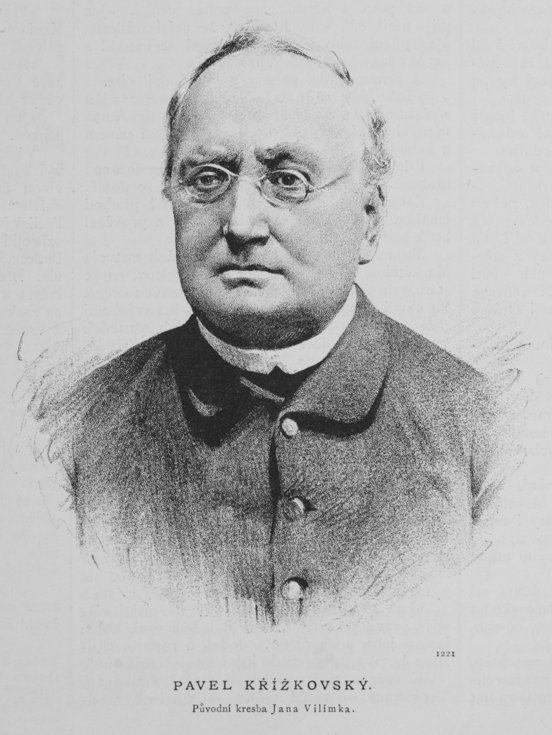
Portrait of Křížkovský by Jan Vilímek

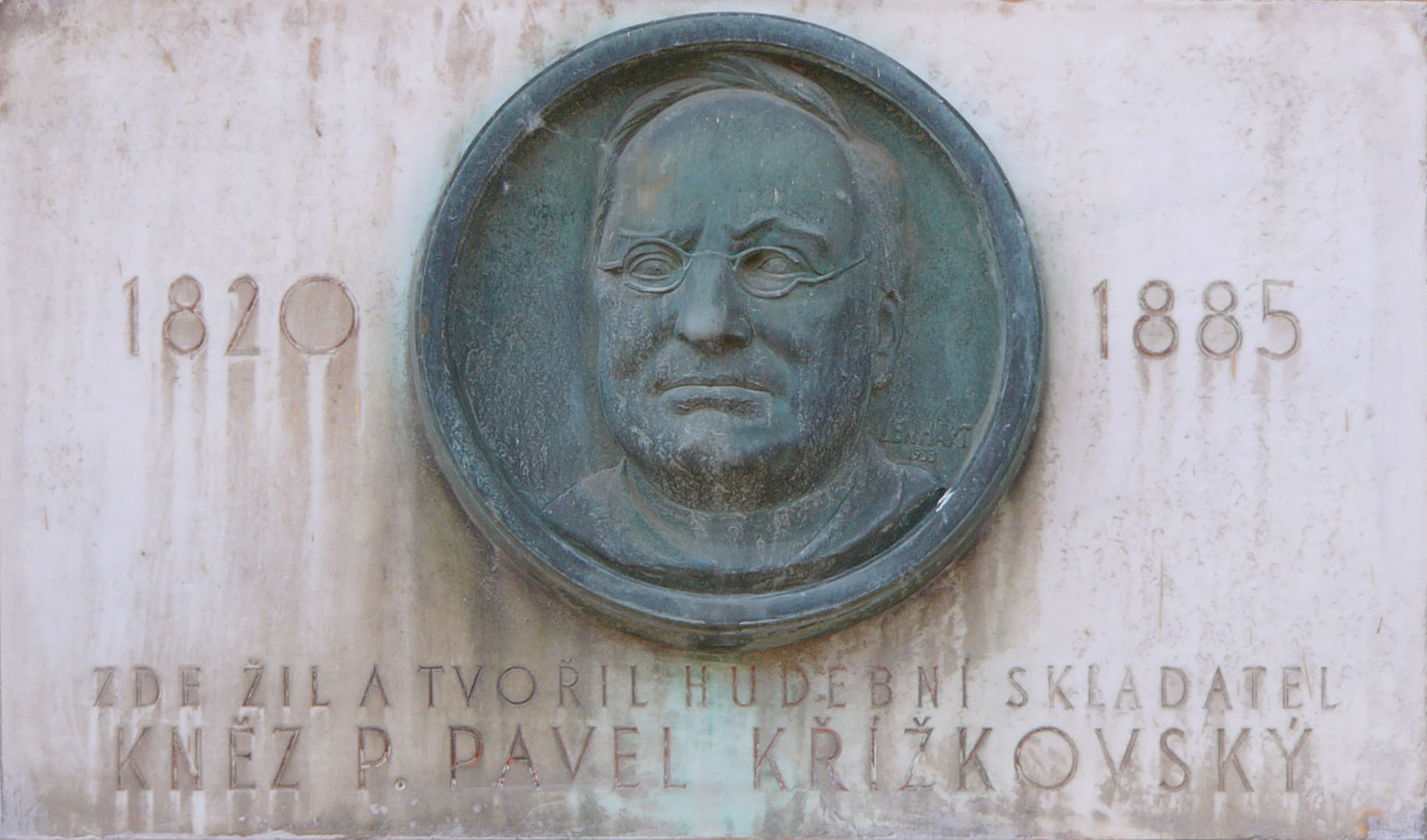
Memorial plaque of Křížkovský

Pavel Křížkovský (born Karel Křížkovský; 9 January 1820 – 8 May 1885) was a Czech choral composer and conductor.

== Life ==
Křížkovský was born in Holasovice, Austrian Silesia. He was a chorister in a monastery in Opava when young, and studied at the Faculty of Philosophy of University of Olomouc and later in Brno. The palace, in which Křižkovský lived from 1878 to 1883, is now used as the Palacký University of Olomouc Rectory. He became an Augustinian friar in 1845, entering the St. Thomas's Abbey, and was named choirmaster there in 1848. He founded two choral societies in Brno, and gave choral and chamber music concerts there regularly. Among his choral students was Leoš Janáček. Křížkovský was a dedicated Slavic culturalist, and often gave performances of lesser-known Moravian and Czech composers before withdrawing from secular musicianship in the 1870s as a result of the Cecilian movement. Following this he became choir director at a cathedral in Olomouc, and retired in 1877. He died in Brno on 8 May 1885.

Most of Křížkovský's compositional output consists of choral settings of folk songs and sacred vocal music. His best known work is the cantata Sts. Cyril and Methodius.
