= Holasovice =

- Municipality
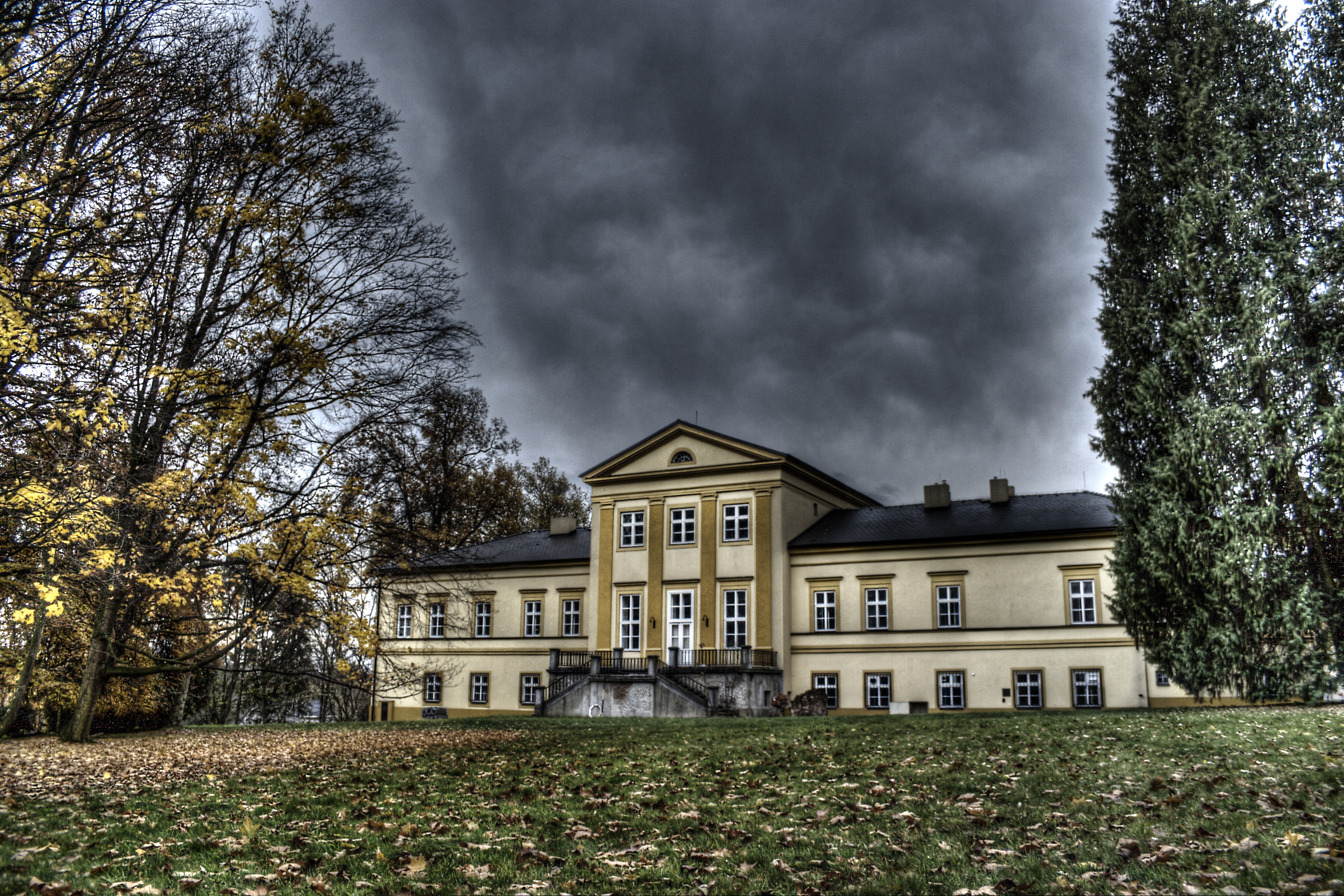
- Štemplovec Castle

- Flag Coat of arms

- Location in the Czech Republic
- Coordinates: 49°59′54″N 17°48′31″E
- Country: Czech Republic
- Region: Moravian-Silesian
- District: Opava
- First mentioned: 1155

Area
  - Total: 16.23 km^{2} (6.27 sq mi)
- Elevation: 278 m (912 ft)

Population (2026-01-01)
  - Total: 1,372
  - Density: 84.53/km^{2} (218.9/sq mi)
- Time zone: UTC+1 (CET)
  - Summer (DST): UTC+2 (CEST)
- Postal code: 747 74
- Website: www.obec-holasovice.cz

Holasovice (German: Kreuzendorf) is a municipality and village in Opava District in the Moravian-Silesian Region of the Czech Republic. It has about 1,400 inhabitants.

== Administrative division ==
Holasovice consists of four municipal parts (in brackets population according to the 2021 census):

- Holasovice (690)
- Kamenec (143)
- Loděnice (386)
- Štemplovec (94)

== Geography ==
Holasovice is located about 8 kilometres (5 mi) northwest from Opava and 34 km (21 mi) northwest from Ostrava, on the border with Poland. It lies mostly in the Nízký Jeseník range, but the eastern part of the municipal territory with the Holasovice village lies in the Opava Hilly Land. The highest point is the Hůrka hill at 355 m (1,165 ft) above sea level. The Opava River flows through the municipality.

== History ==
The first written mention of Holasovice is in a papal bull of Pope Adrian IV from 23 April 1155.

== Demographics ==
Historical population

| Year | Pop. | ±% |
|---|---|---|
| 1869 | 1,569 | — |
| 1880 | 1,686 | +7.5% |
| 1890 | 1,817 | +7.8% |
| 1900 | 1,802 | −0.8% |
| 1910 | 1,726 | −4.2% |

| Year | Pop. | ±% |
|---|---|---|
| 1921 | 1,708 | −1.0% |
| 1930 | 1,793 | +5.0% |
| 1950 | 1,516 | −15.4% |
| 1961 | 1,598 | +5.4% |
| 1970 | 1,449 | −9.3% |

| Year | Pop. | ±% |
|---|---|---|
| 1980 | 1,320 | −8.9% |
| 1991 | 1,324 | +0.3% |
| 2001 | 1,394 | +5.3% |
| 2011 | 1,318 | −5.5% |
| 2021 | 1,313 | −0.4% |

Source: Censuses

== Transport ==
Holasovice is located on the railway line Opava–Rýmařov.

== Sights ==
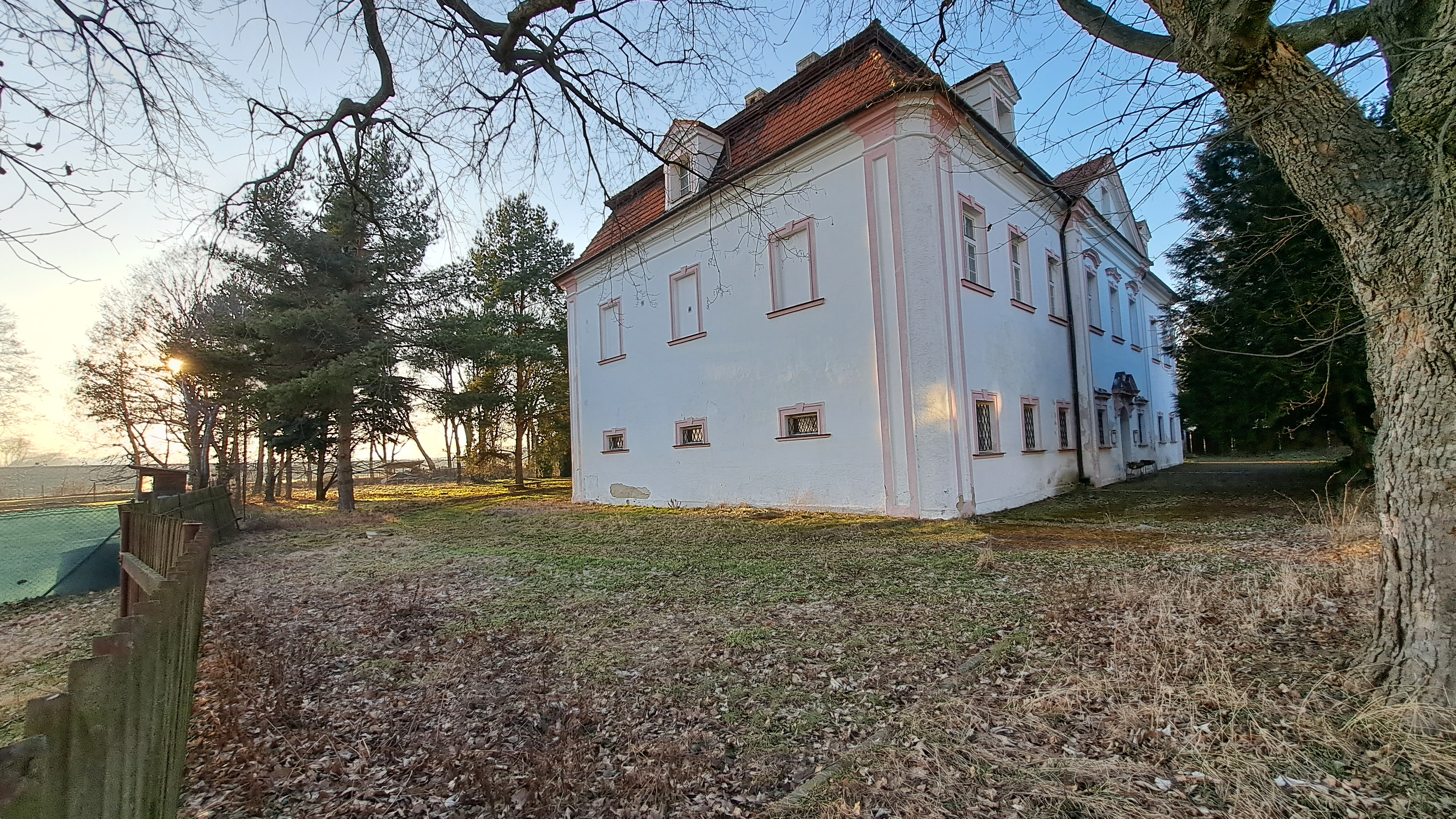
Loděnice Castle

The most important monument is the Štemplovec Castle. It was built in Baroque and Empire styles in the first quarter of the 19th century. In 1929, it was modified by the architect Leopold Bauer. The castle is surrounded by an English park.

In Loděnice is a small Baroque rural castle. It dates from the second quarter of the 18th century.

== Notable people ==
- Pavel Křížkovský (1820–1885), choral composer and conductor
