= Maria Jasin =

American cancer researcher and developmental biologist

- Born: 1956 (age 69–70); Detroit, Michigan
- Education: Massachusetts Institute of Technology (PhD); Florida Atlantic University (BSc)
- Known for: Research of homologous recombination
- Awards: Shaw Prize in Life science and medicine Mendel Lectures
- Scientific career
- Fields: Developmental biology
- Institutions: Memorial Sloan Kettering Cancer Center; Cornell University; Stanford University; University of Zurich
- Thesis: Gene deletions and point mutations which define functional domains in alanine tRNA synthetase (1984)
- Doctoral advisor: Paul Schimmel

Maria Jasin (born 1956) is a developmental biologist at the Memorial Sloan Kettering Cancer Center. She is known for studying homologous recombination, a method in which double-strand breaks in DNA strands are repaired, and for discovering the role of BRCA1 and BRCA2 in cancers.

== Early life, education and career ==
Jasin was born in 1956 in Detroit, Michigan. Her father was from present-day Slovakia, while the family of her Canada-born mother was from today's Iraq. After her mother died, Jasin's father relocated the family to south Florida. Jasin and her older sister went to Florida Atlantic University for undergraduate studies, where she graduated with a BSc.

Jasin received her PhD in 1984 from the Massachusetts Institute of Technology under the supervision of Paul Schimmel. She then went to Switzerland as a postdoctoral fellow at the University of Zurich for a year, and then returned to the United States as a postdoctoral fellow at Stanford University until 1990.

In 1990, Jasin joined the Memorial Sloan Kettering Cancer Center (MSKCC) and Cornell University as an assistant professor and Frederick R. Adler Chair for Junior Faculty (until 1993). She was subsequently promoted to associate professor in 1996 and full professor and William E. Snee Chair in 2000.

Currently, she leads her own research group at the Developmental Biology Program in MSKCC, and is affiliated with the Weill Cornell Graduate School of Medical Sciences. Jasin has been an investigator at the Breast Cancer Research Foundation since 2017.

== Research ==
Jasin's research focuses on homologous recombination. She showed in 1994 that expressing a restriction enzyme that recognizes DNA sequences uncommon in the target genome, also known as a rare-cutting restriction enzyme, can generate DNA double strand breaks (DSBs) at specific locations, allowing for targeted genome editing. Her key study in 1998 found that DNA double strand breaks increases the likelihood of homologous recombination by 1000 folds.

The next year, in separate reports, Jasin's group discovered that BRCA1 and XRCC3 are, respectively, required for and involved in homologous recombination. Then in 2001, Jasin's group reported BRCA2 is also required for homologous recombination. Together, these discoveries show how BRCA1 and BRCA2 mutations cause cancers.

== Honors and awards ==
- Mendel Lectures (2015)
- Member of the National Academy of Sciences (2015)
- Member of the National Academy of Medicine (2016)
- Member of the American Academy of Arts and Sciences (2017)
- Shaw Prize in Life science and medicine (2019)
- Fellow of the American Association for Cancer Research Academy (2020)
- Member of the American Philosophical Society (2022)
- Pearl Meister Greengard Prize (2025)
