= Azim Surani =

Kenyan-British developmental biologist

Azim Surani CBE FRS FMedSci
- Born: 1945 (age 80–81); Kisumu, Kenya
- Education: Plymouth University (BSc); University of Strathclyde (MSc); University of Cambridge (PhD)
- Awards: Gabor Medal (2001); Royal Medal (2010); Mendel Lectures (2010); Gairdner Foundation International Award (2018); Mendel Medal (2022); Kyoto Prize (2025); Paul Ehrlich and Ludwig Darmstaedter Prize (2026)
- Scientific career
- Workplaces: University of Cambridge
- Thesis: Modulation of Implanting Rat Blastocysts to Macromolecular Secretions of the Uterus (1975)
- Doctoral advisor: Robert Edwards
- Doctoral students: Kat Arney
- Other notable students: Anne Ferguson-Smith (postdoc)
- Website: www.gurdon.cam.ac.uk/research/surani

Azim Surani (born 1945 in Kisumu, Kenya) is a Kenyan-British developmental biologist who has been Marshall–Walton Professor at the Wellcome Trust/Cancer Research UK Gurdon Institute at the University of Cambridge since 1992, and Director of Germline and Epigenomics Research since 2013.

== Education ==
Surani was educated at Plymouth University (BSc), the University of Strathclyde (MSc) and the University of Cambridge (PhD) where his research was supervised by Robert Edwards, who later won the Nobel Prize in Physiology or Medicine.

== Career and research ==
Surani co-discovered mammalian genomic imprinting with Davor Solter in 1984, and subsequently examined its mechanism and the functions of imprinted genes. He later established the genetic basis for germ cell specification, using a single-cell analysis in mice. This genetic network also initiates the unique resetting of the germline epigenome, including comprehensive erasure of DNA methylation towards re-establishing full genomic potency. Epigenetic modifications and re-establishments of imprints then generate functional differences between parental genomes whilst aberrant imprints contribute to human disease.

Surani's research is identifying key regulators of human germ line development and epigenome reprogramming, revealing differences between humans and mice attributable to their divergent pluripotent states and early postimplantation development. He is also investigating transposable elements, host defence mechanisms, noncoding RNAs, and the potential for transgenerational epigenetic inheritance in mammals.

== Awards and honours ==
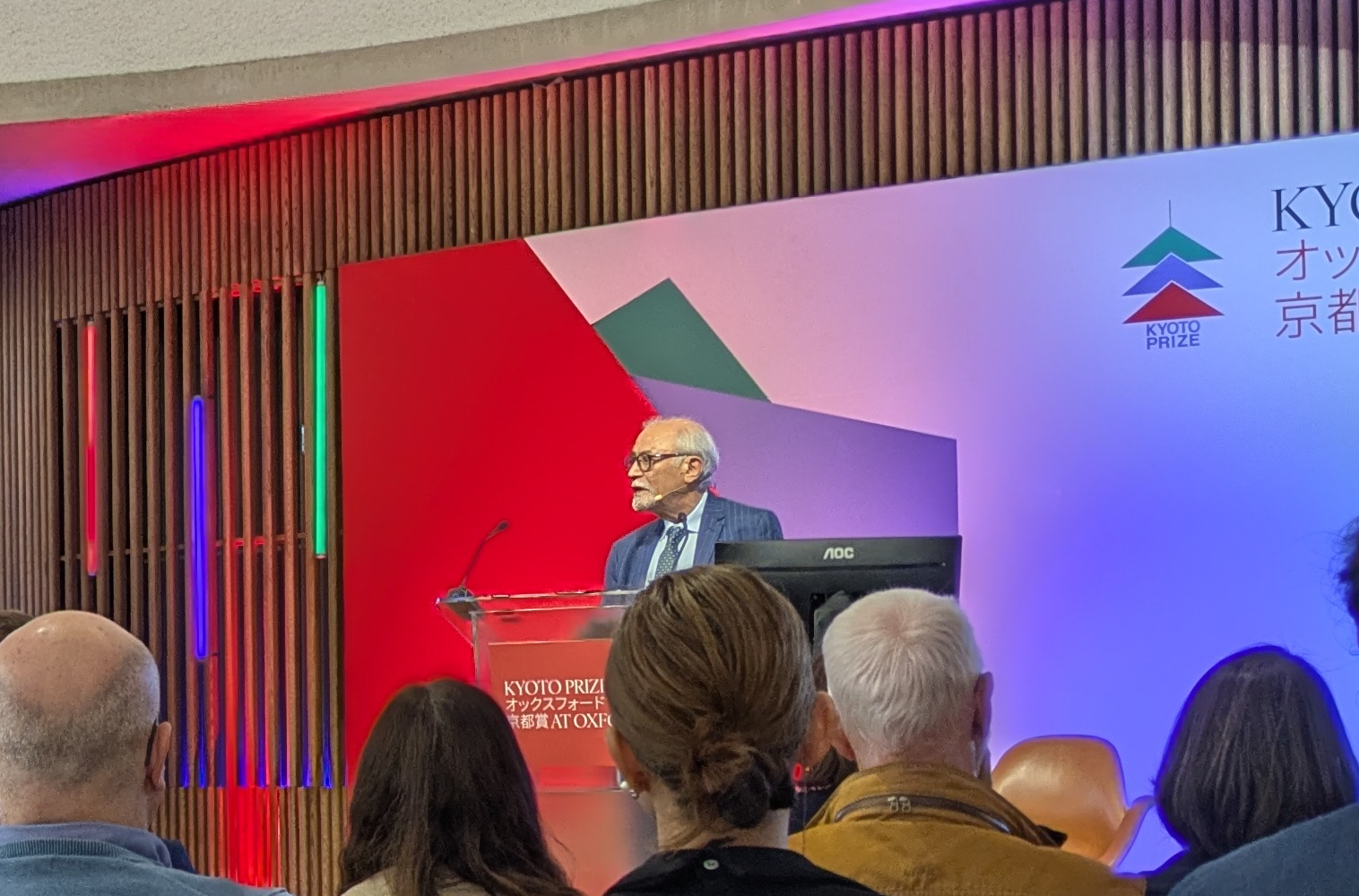
Azim Surani in 2026, talking on his 2025 Kyoto Prize in Oxford

Surani has received several awards for his work including the Royal Medal (2010), the Gabor Medal (2001) and the Mendel Lectures (2010). He received the Canada Gairdner International Award, with Davor Solter, "For the discovery of mammalian genomic imprinting that causes parent-of-origin specific gene expression and its consequences for development and disease." He won the Rosenstiel Award in 2006, with Solter and Mary Lyon, for "pioneering work on epigenetic gene regulation in mammalian embryos". In 2025 he was awarded the Kyoto Prize in the category "Life Sciences". In 2026 he was awarded the Paul Ehrlich and Ludwig Darmstaedter Prize, together with Davor Solter.
