= St Thomas's Abbey, Brno =

Augustinian monastery in Brno, Czech Republic

Coordinates: 49°11′27″N 16°35′35″E

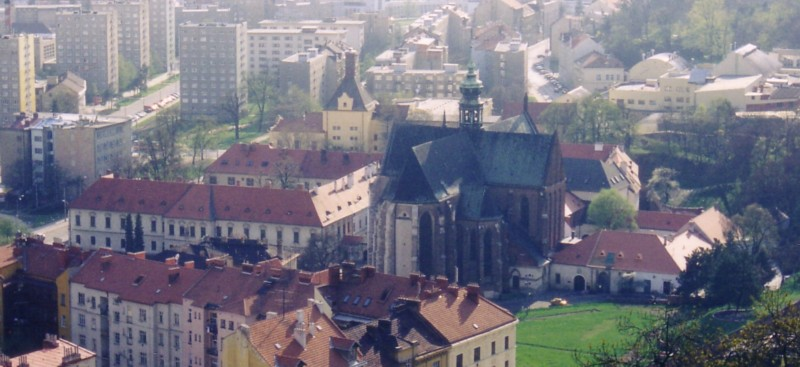
The Augustinian Abbey of St Thomas, Brno

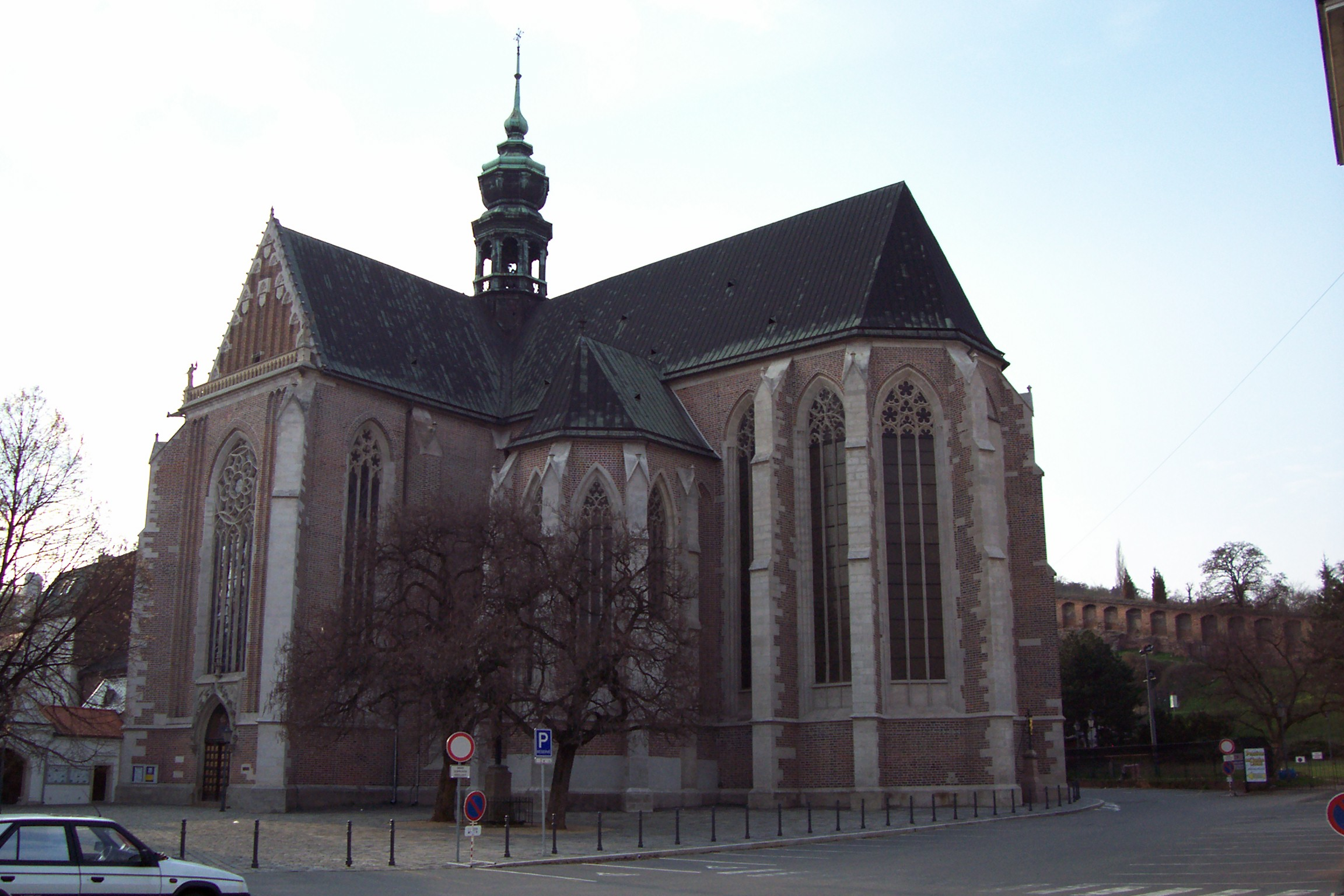
Abbey church of the Assumption

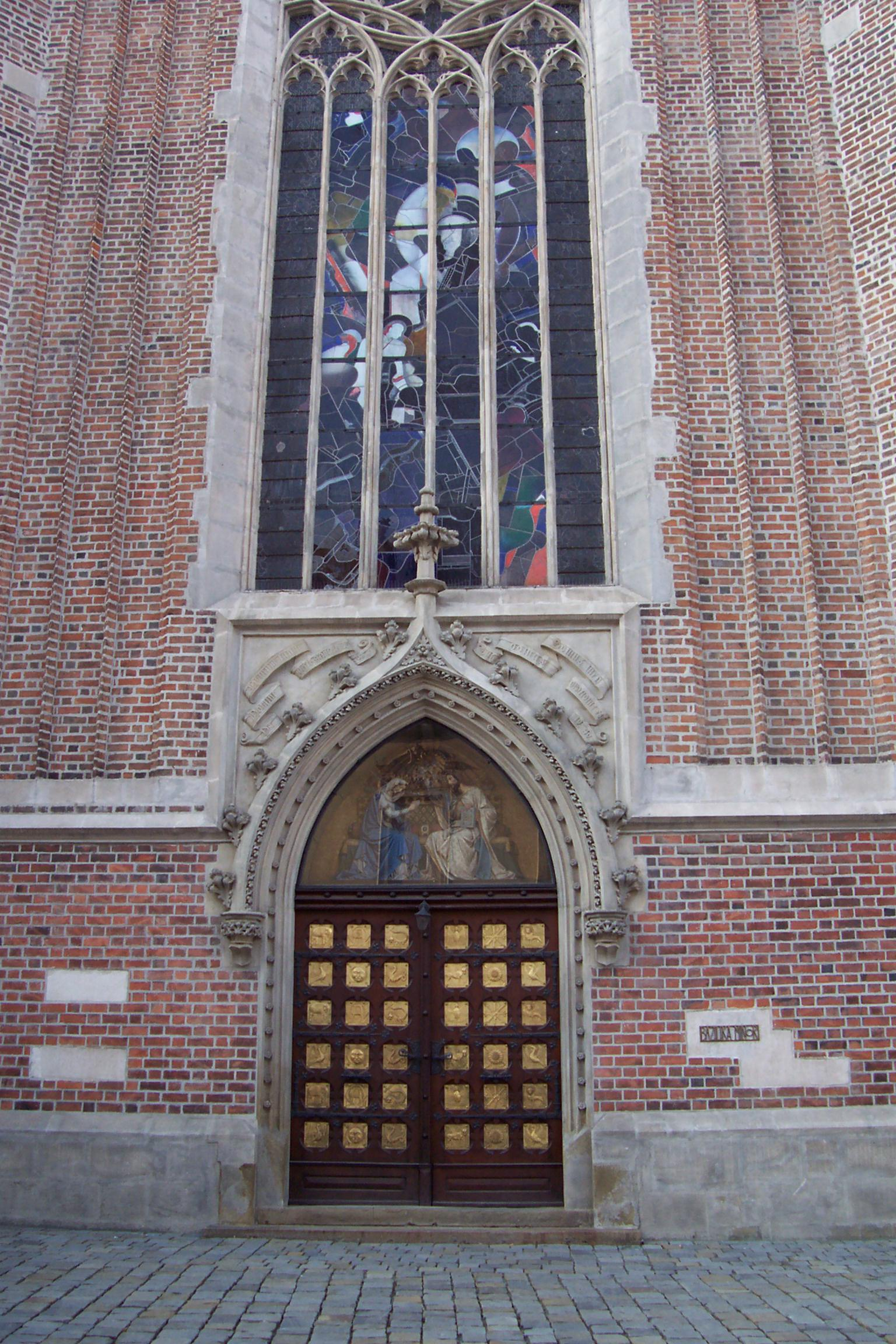
The south entrance of the church

St Thomas's Abbey (or the Königskloster) (Czech: Starobrněnský klášter) is an Augustinian abbey and church located in Brno in the Czech Republic. The geneticist and abbot Gregor Mendel was its most famous religious leader to date, who between 1856 and 1863 conducted his experiments on pea plants in the monastery garden. His experiments brought forth two generalizations which later became known as Mendel's Laws of Inheritance.

The Abbey is unique amongst modern Augustinian foundations because it is not called a priory, and indeed it has an abbot (Prälat - prelate) whereas all other existing Augustinian friaries are led by a prior.

== History ==
The Augustinians arrived in Brno in 1346, and John Henry of Luxemburg (Jan Jindřich Lucemburský), Margrave of Moravia, began the construction of their original cloister in 1352. These premises are located on Moravian Square. In 1650s, a musical foundation for the monastery was established, with paid musical scholars. This was the early beginning of a long and significant musical tradition at the Brno monastery. In 1780s, the Emperor Joseph II forced the friars to move out because he liked their well-located and representative buildings. These were given to the governor office and the church was turned to standard parish church. The friars moved to suburban Staré Brno where they took over the abolished Cistercian convent and church.

Czech composer Pavel Křížkovský also took monastic vows at Brno, teaching liturgical music from 1848 until 1872, and from 1865 he formed an ongoing musical collaboration with the young (lay) composer Leoš Janáček who had come from his home in Hukvaldy and begun as a choirboy at the monastery.

== Mendel Museum ==
The Augustinian Abbey now hosts the Mendel Museum of Genetics dedicated to the founder of genetics. Visits to the Museum include a walk in the garden in which Gregor Mendel carried out his famous experiments.
