= Walter Salzburger =

Austrian-Swiss zoologist and evolutionary biologist

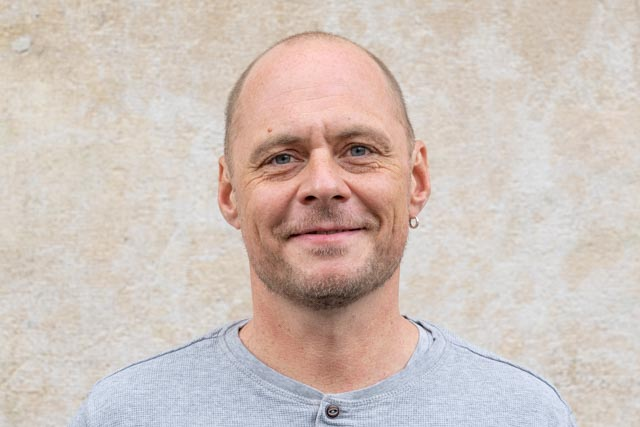
- Walter Salzburger (2020)
- Awards: Walther-Arndt-Preis (2011), LBS Umweltpreis (2004)
- Scientific career
- Fields: Zoology and evolutionary biology
- Workplaces: University of Innsbruck, University of Konstanz, University of Lausanne, University of Basel

Walter Salzburger (born 1 January 1975) is an Austrian-Swiss zoologist and evolutionary biologist and Professor at the Zoological Institute, Department of Environmental Sciences, of the University of Basel in Switzerland.

== Work ==
The research of Walter Salzburger focuses on the understanding of organismal diversification in general and the evolutionary phenomena of adaptive radiation and explosive speciation in particular. Salzburger's main organismal study systems are the exceptionally diverse adaptive radiations of cichlid fishes in East Africa, and in particular the cichlid fauna of Lake Tanganyika. In addition, his group has worked on vision in deep-sea fishes, among many other topics.

== Awards and honors ==
- 2008: European Research Council (ERC) Starting Grant
- 2011: Walther-Arndt-Preis of the Deutsche Zoologische Gesellschaft
- 2013: European Research Council (ERC) Consolidator Grant
