= International Clinical Research Center =

Research center in Brno, Czech Republic

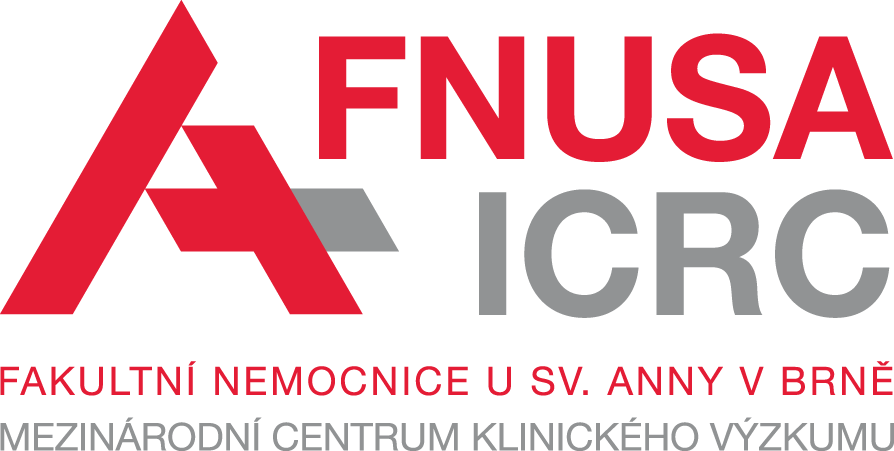

International Clinical Research Center Brno (ICRC) is a conceptually novel project in biomedical research and clinical patient care which is being developed by the Czech Republic and the Mayo Clinic in Rochester, Minnesota. The goal of ICRC consists of creating a research platform to allow cutting edge clinical research being conducted in the central Europe, particularly in Brno, Czech Republic.

== Origins of the ICRC Project ==
At the beginning of the ICRC concept was a close and fruitful collaboration between physicians and researchers in the Cardiology Department of St. Anne's Hospital in Brno, Czech Republic, and their counterparts at the Division of Cardiovascular Diseases at the Mayo Clinic, Rochester, Minnesota. Particularly the stay of MUDr. Tomas Kara, Ph.D. in the laboratory of Dr. Virend Somers at the Mayo clinic in early 2000 established the high yield of such cooperation, and led to the origins of the idea that a new and globally competitive scientific facility would be needed in Brno, Czech Republic, to support the increasing depth and complexity of research projects being conducted by Mayo and St. Anne's Hospital. The team led by Dr. Kara ultimately recommended building of a new facility (ICRC) in St. Anne's Hospital in Brno, Czech Republic which would be sufficiently equipped to support an ongoing global cooperation with the world-wide leader in translational biomedical research, the Mayo Clinic.

== Building of ICRC Brno ==
The ICRC project was supported by both the Mayo Clinic, and by the government of the Czech Republic in a Memorandum of Understanding, and this ultimately led to the beginning of construction of the ICRC scientific facility. The foundation stone was laid on October 7, 2008 in Brno, Czech Republic with the presence of the Prime Minister of the Czech Republic, the Ambassador of the United States to the Czech Republic, the leadership of the ICRC project, and the local government and community leaders from the South Moravia region.

== Results of the ICRC Collaboration ==
The scientific collaboration on the ICRC platform resulted in publications in medical journals, including the New England Journal of Medicine, the Circulation Journal, the Journal of the American College of Cardiology, the Chest journal, the American Journal of Cardiology, and many others. During the 10 years of this Czech-American cooperation more than 30 Czech physicians, bioengineers and other researchers had a chance to visit and work at the Mayo Clinic in Minnesota, and the leading clinical researchers from the Mayo Clinic visited Brno, Czech Republic on a countless number of occasions. The most recent efforts in cardiovascular research are conducted by a broad team of Czech and American researchers, including Dr. Tomas Kara, Dr. Virend Somers, Dr. Samuel Asirvatham, Dr. Alexander Schirger, Dr. John Schirger, Dr. Tom Konecny, Dr. Marek Orban, Ing. Pavel Leinveber, and Ing. Jan Bukartyk. The latest results from the ICRC collaboration are regularly being presented at the most significant international meetings, including the American Heart Association Scientific Sessions (2009), American College of Cardiology Scientific Sessions (2009, 2010), Czech Society of Cardiology Scientific Meeting (2010), American College of Physicians Chapter Meeting (2008, 2009), and others.

=== Academic Partners ===
FNUSA-ICRC collaborates with international institutions, including the Mayo Clinic (USA), University of California San Diego (USA), Karolinska Institutet and Lund University (both Sweden), University of Calgary (Canada), University of South Florida (USA), among others. Additionally, collaboration extends to other significant Czech institutions such as Masaryk University, Brno University of Technology, University of Veterinary and Pharmaceutical Sciences Brno, the Institute of Biophysics, and the Institute of Instrument Technology of the Czech Academy of Sciences.

== Collaboration with Industry ==
Collaboration with representatives of the industrial sector, primarily including pharmaceutical companies, contract research organizations, and medical technology manufacturers, takes several forms. FNUSA-ICRC conducts clinical trials of new drugs and clinical evaluations of medical devices. It is a preferred partner, known as a Prime Site, for the world's largest clinical trial intermediary, the American company IQVIA. Additionally, FNUSA-ICRC performs contract research for both large multinational corporations and small local firms. FNUSA-ICRC also holds joint research grants with industrial partners from both the Czech Republic and abroad.

== Societal Role ==
International cooperation simultaneously opens up opportunities for utilizing the latest treatment methods. FNUSA-ICRC presents both professional and popularization activities to the public. The center regularly opens its doors to visitors during the Night of Scientists event, to students through activities at the ICRC Academy, and to the general public during the Open House Brno architecture festival.
